= Tourism in Karnataka =

Karnataka Tourism
- ಕರ್ನಾಟಕ ಪ್ರವಾಸೋದ್ಯಮ
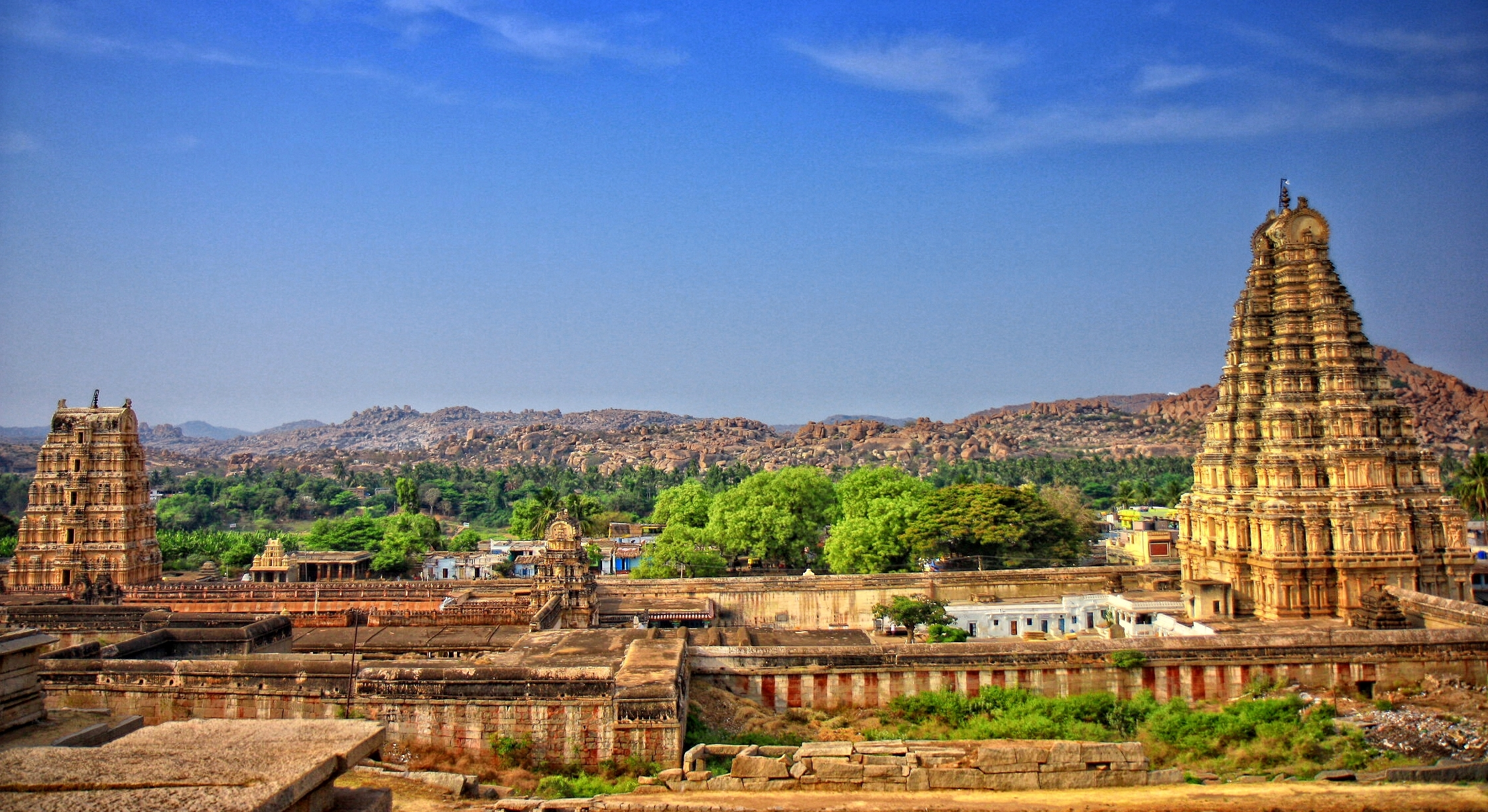
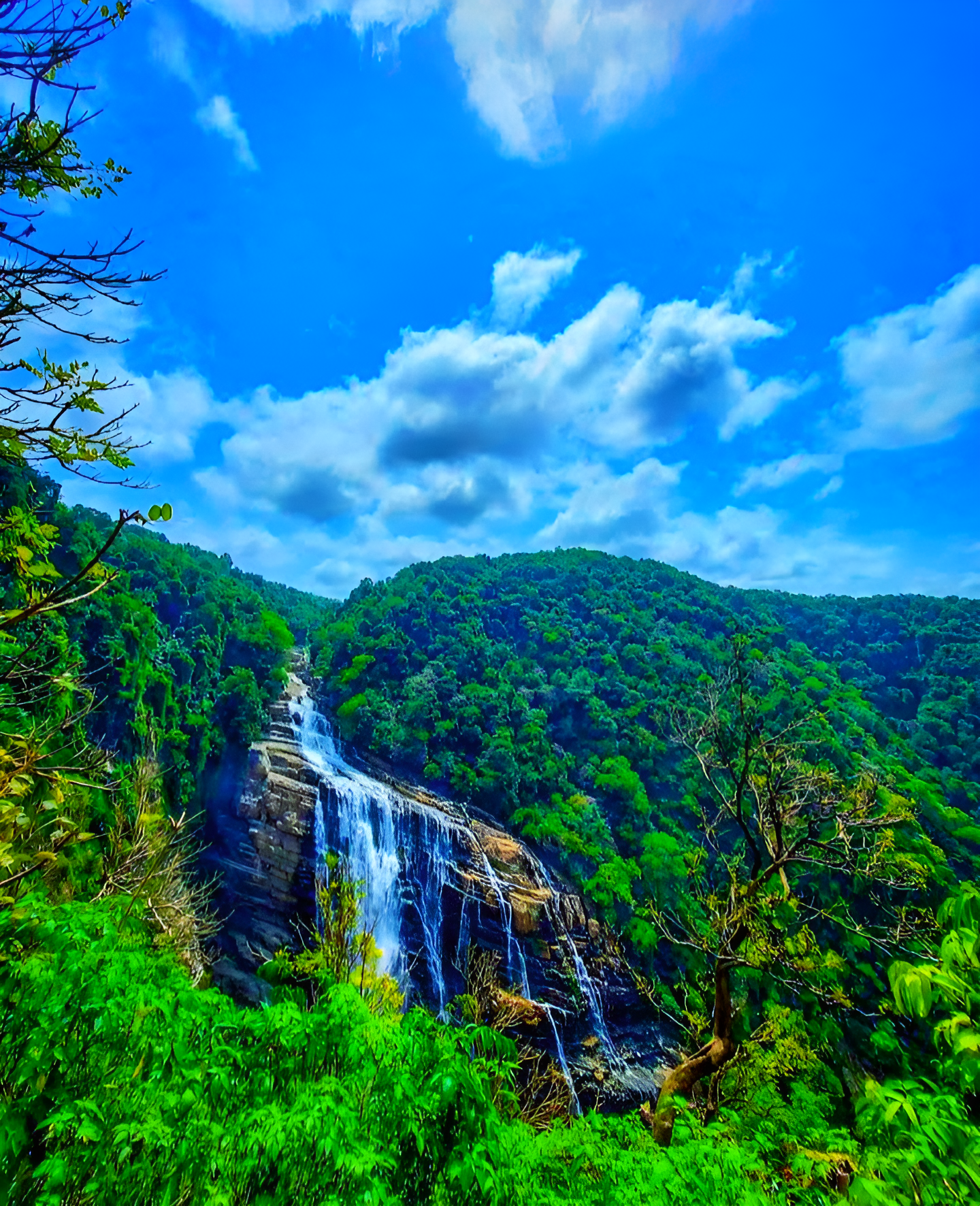
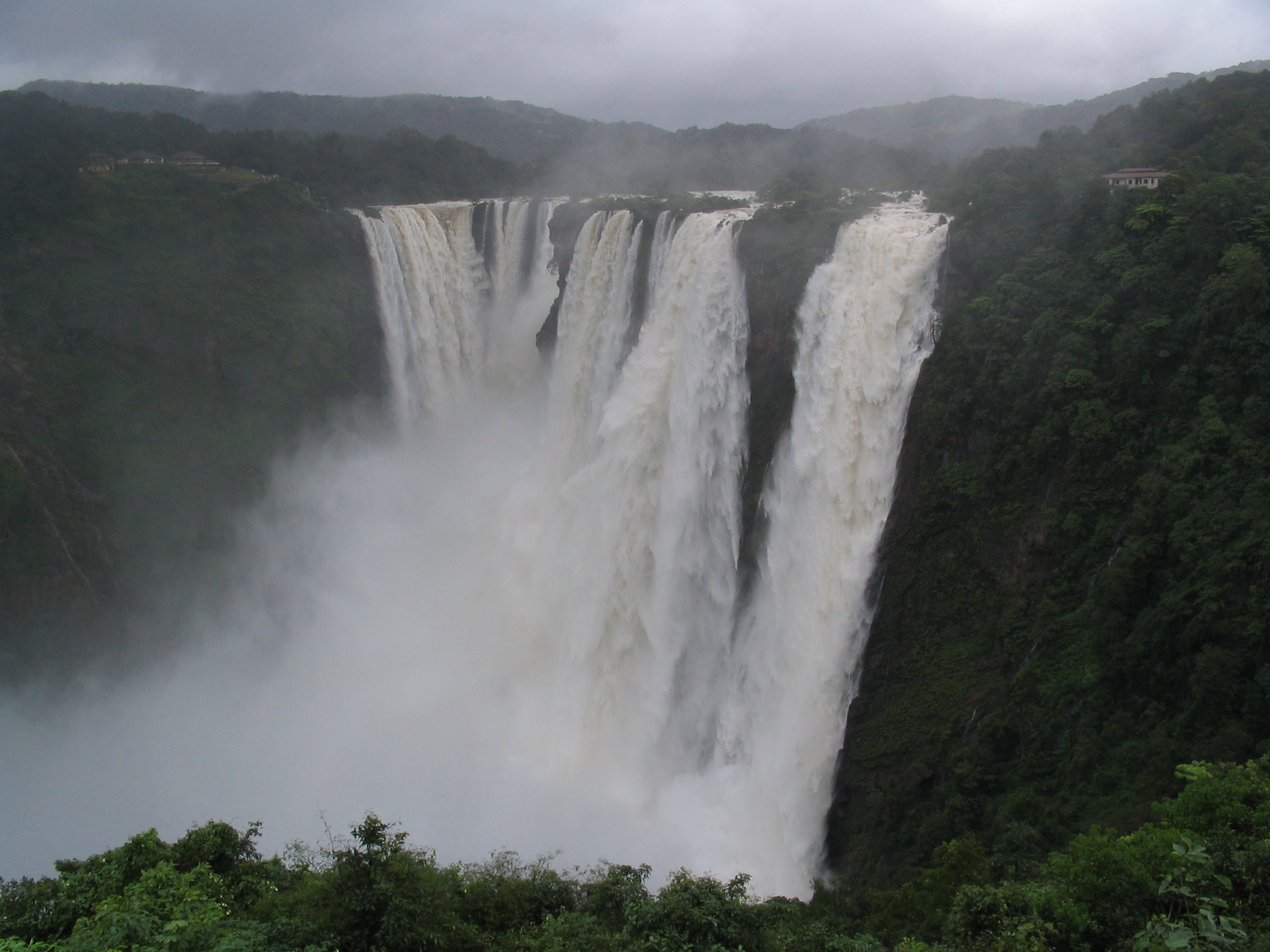
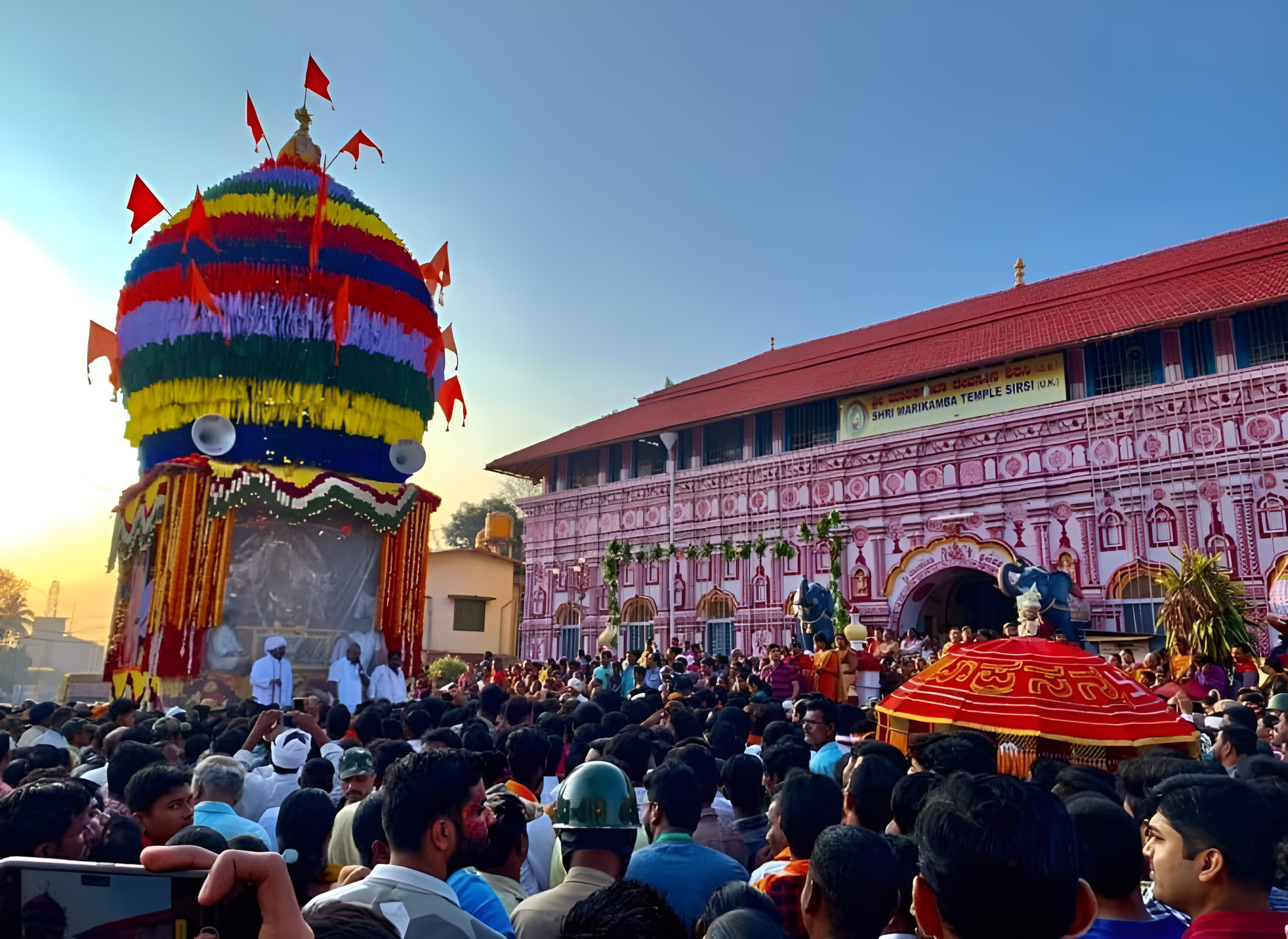
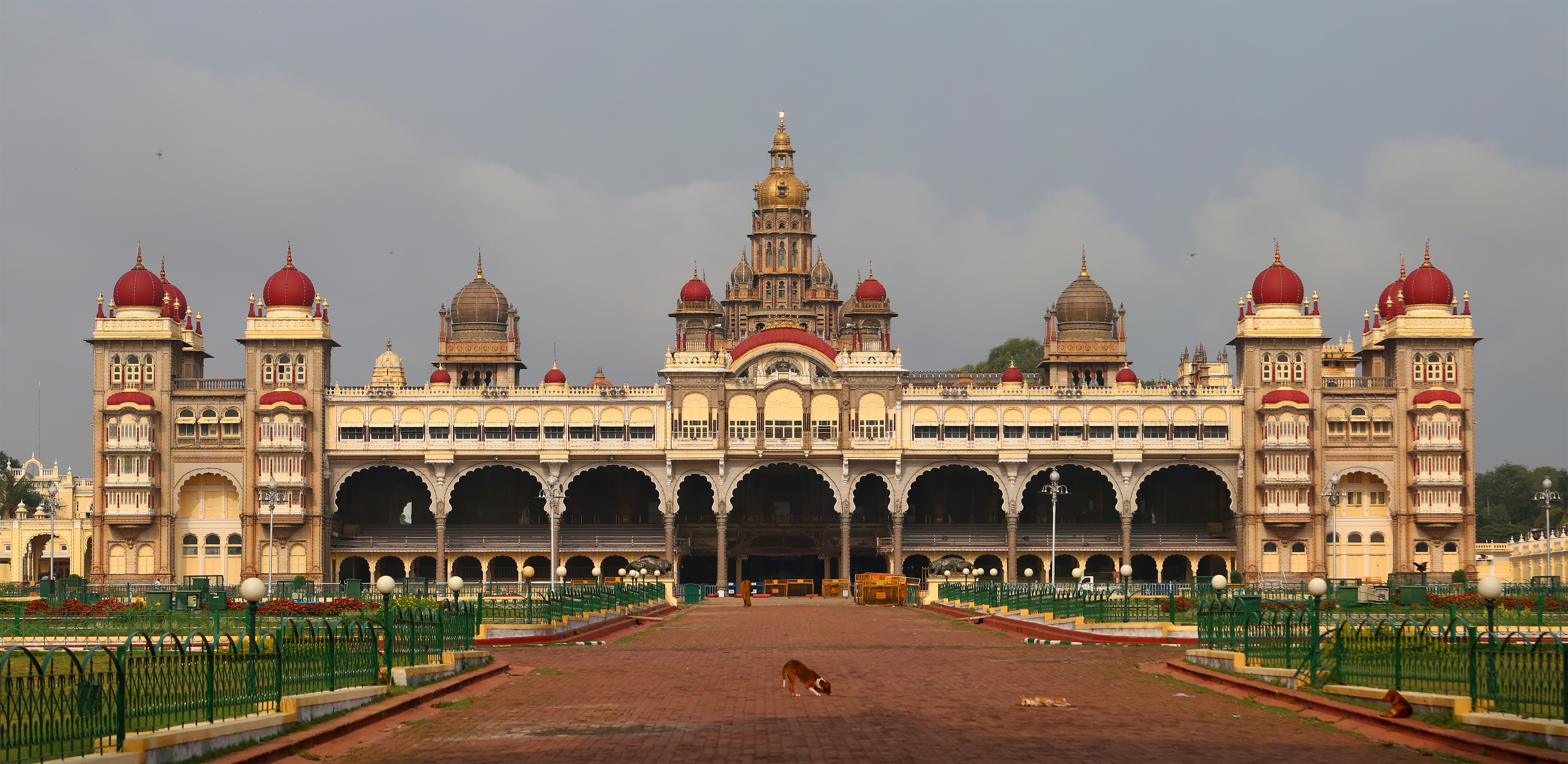
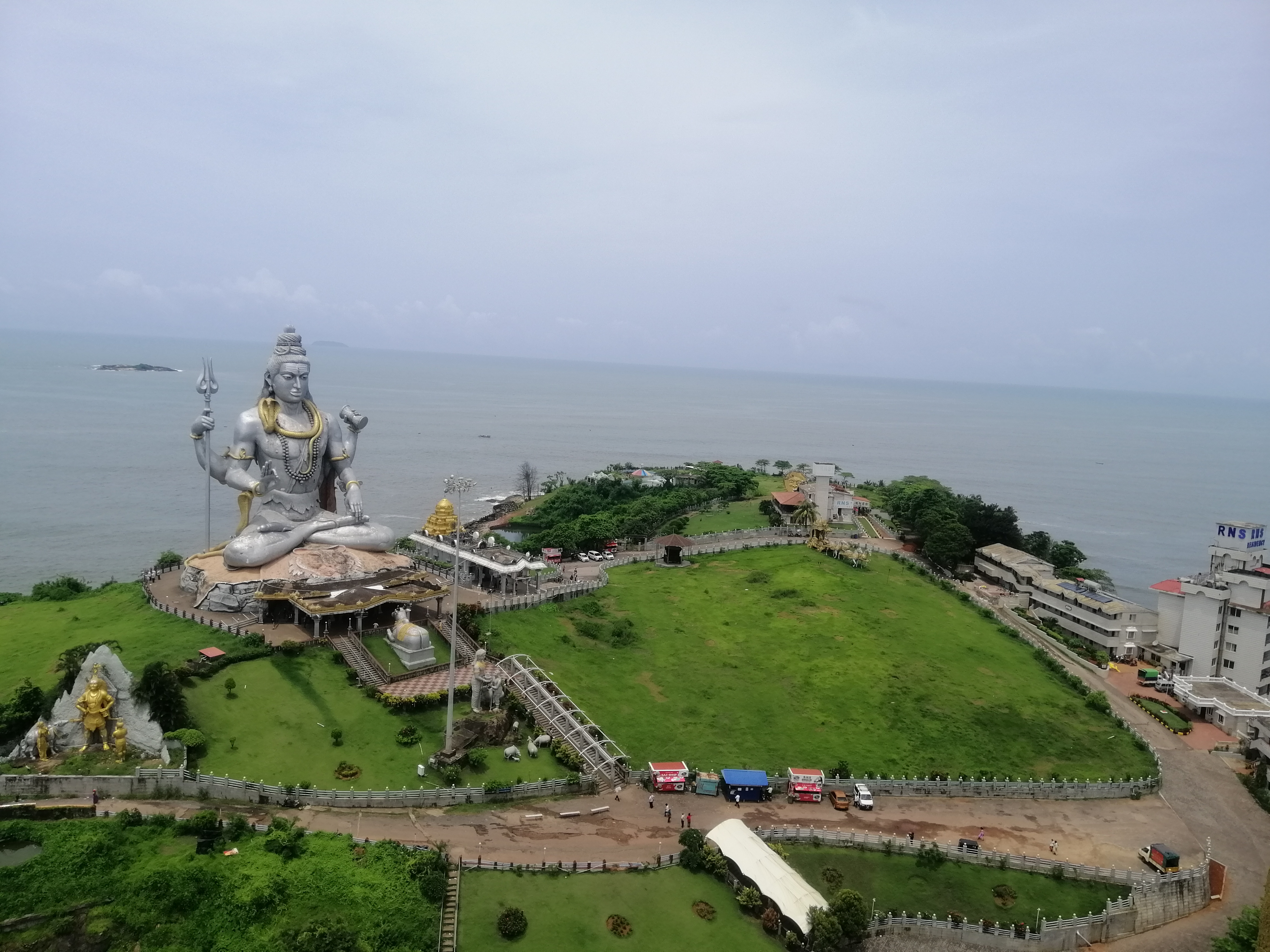
- Hampi Unchalli Falls Jog Falls Sirsi Mysuru Murudeshwar

State Department overview
- Type: State Department
- Jurisdiction: Karnataka
- Headquarters: Bengaluru, Karnataka, India
- Motto: One State Many Worlds
- Tourism Minister responsible: H. K. Patil

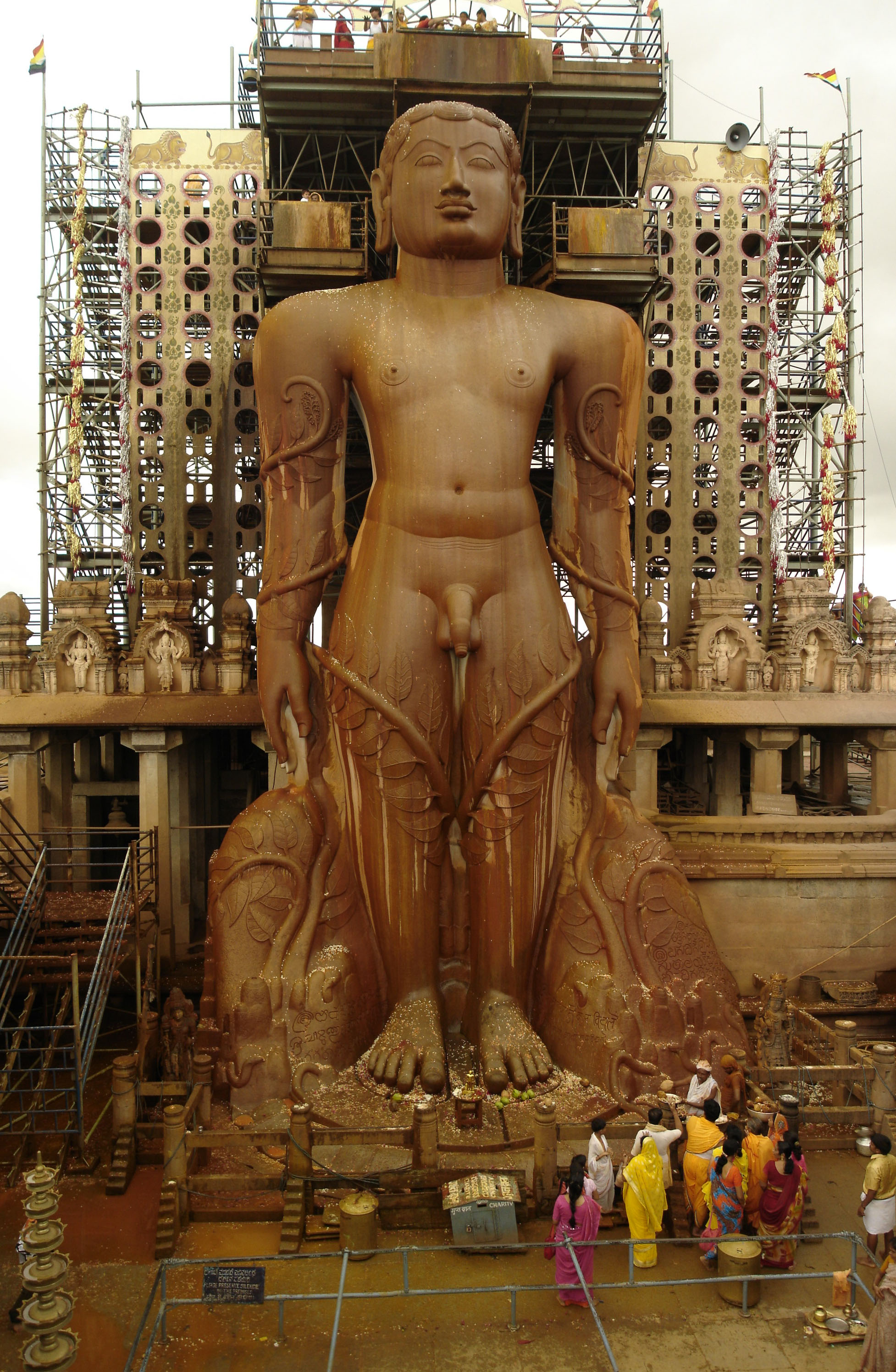
Mahamastakabhisheka of Gommateshwara statue (the largest ancient monolithic statue in the world), at Shravanabelagola

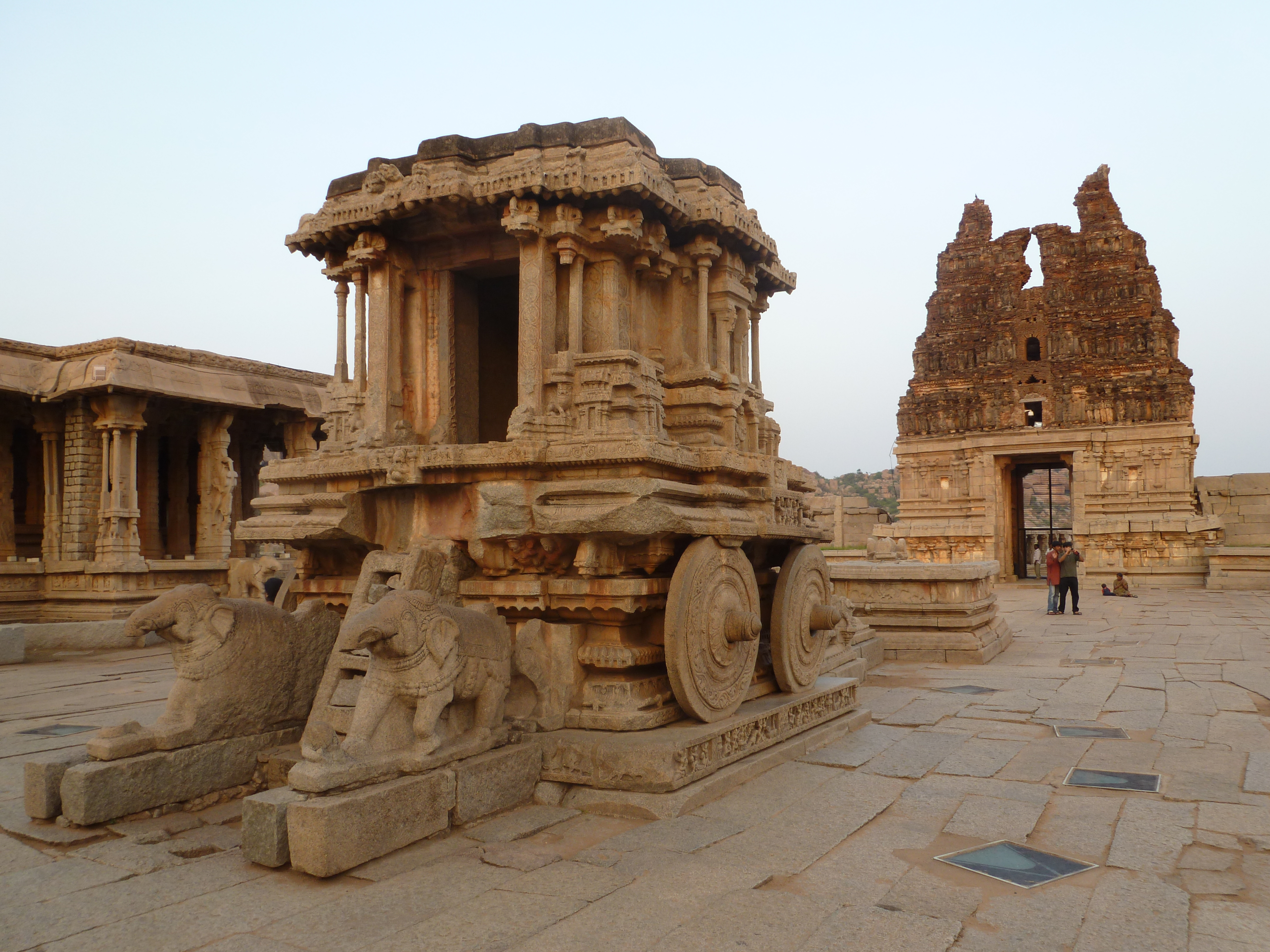
Ruins of Hampi

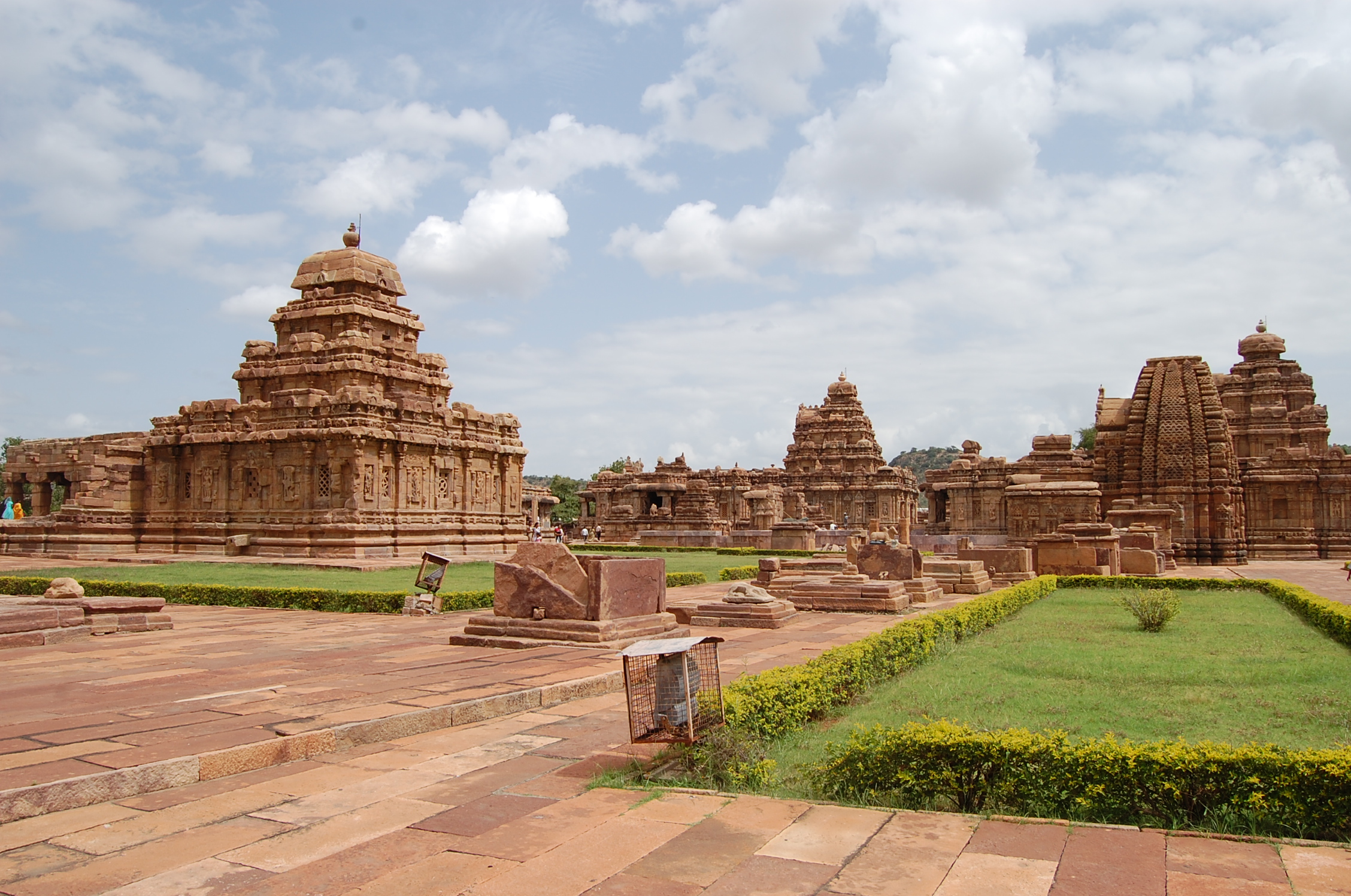
Temples of Pattadakal

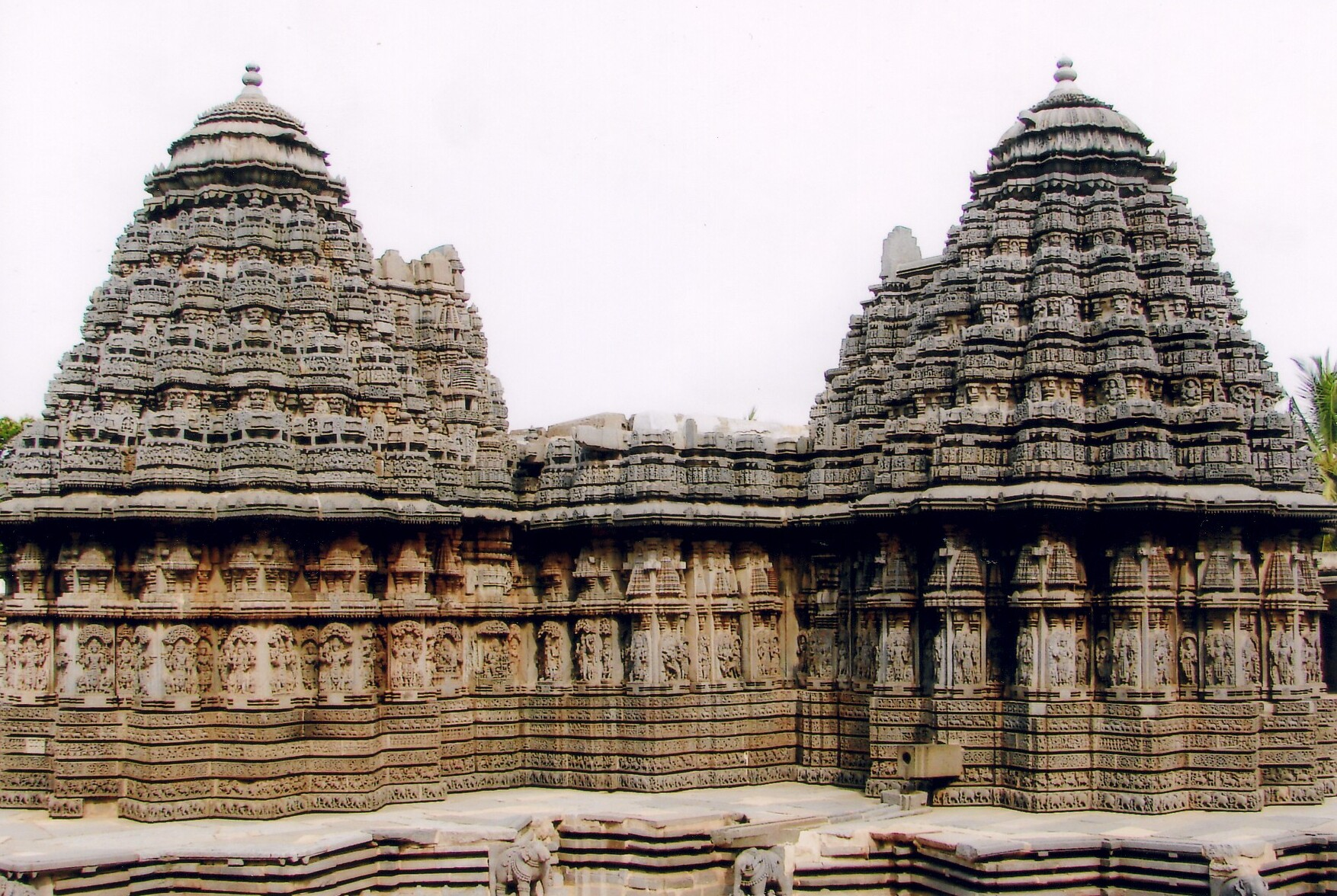
Chennakeshava Temple, Somanathapura built in Hoysala architecture, is a UNESCO World Heritage Site

Karnataka, the sixth largest state in India, was ranked as the third most popular state in the country for tourism in 2014.

It is home to 507 of the 3600 centrally protected monuments in India, second only to Uttar Pradesh. The State Directorate of Archaeology and Museums protects an additional 752 monuments and another 25,000 monuments are yet to receive protection.

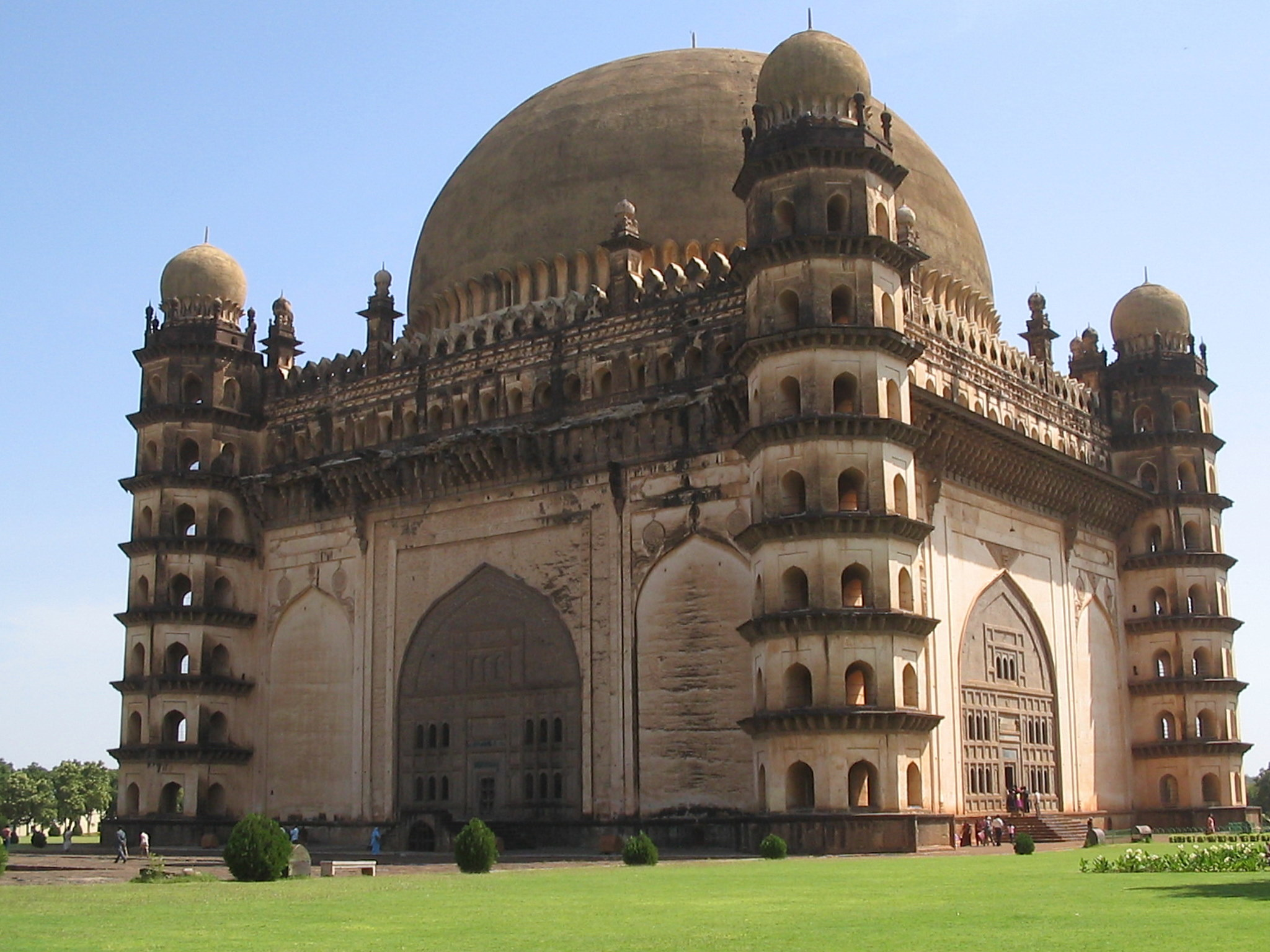
Gol Gumbaz, Bijapur

The ancient sculptured temples, modern cities, hill ranges, forests and beaches are some tourism centers. Broadly, tourism in Karnataka is divided into four geographical regions: North Karnataka, the Hill Stations, Coastal Karnataka and South Karnataka.

The Karnataka government has introduced The Golden Chariot – a train which connects popular tourist destinations in the state and Goa.

The Karnataka State Tourism Development Corporation is the governmental body that works to promote tourism in Karnataka.

Different tourist places in Karnataka.

== North Karnataka ==
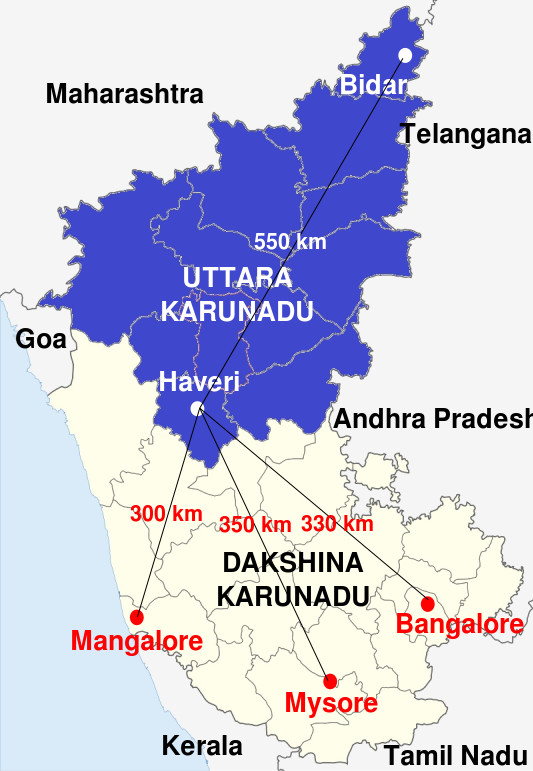
Distance from major cities of Karnataka to North Karnataka

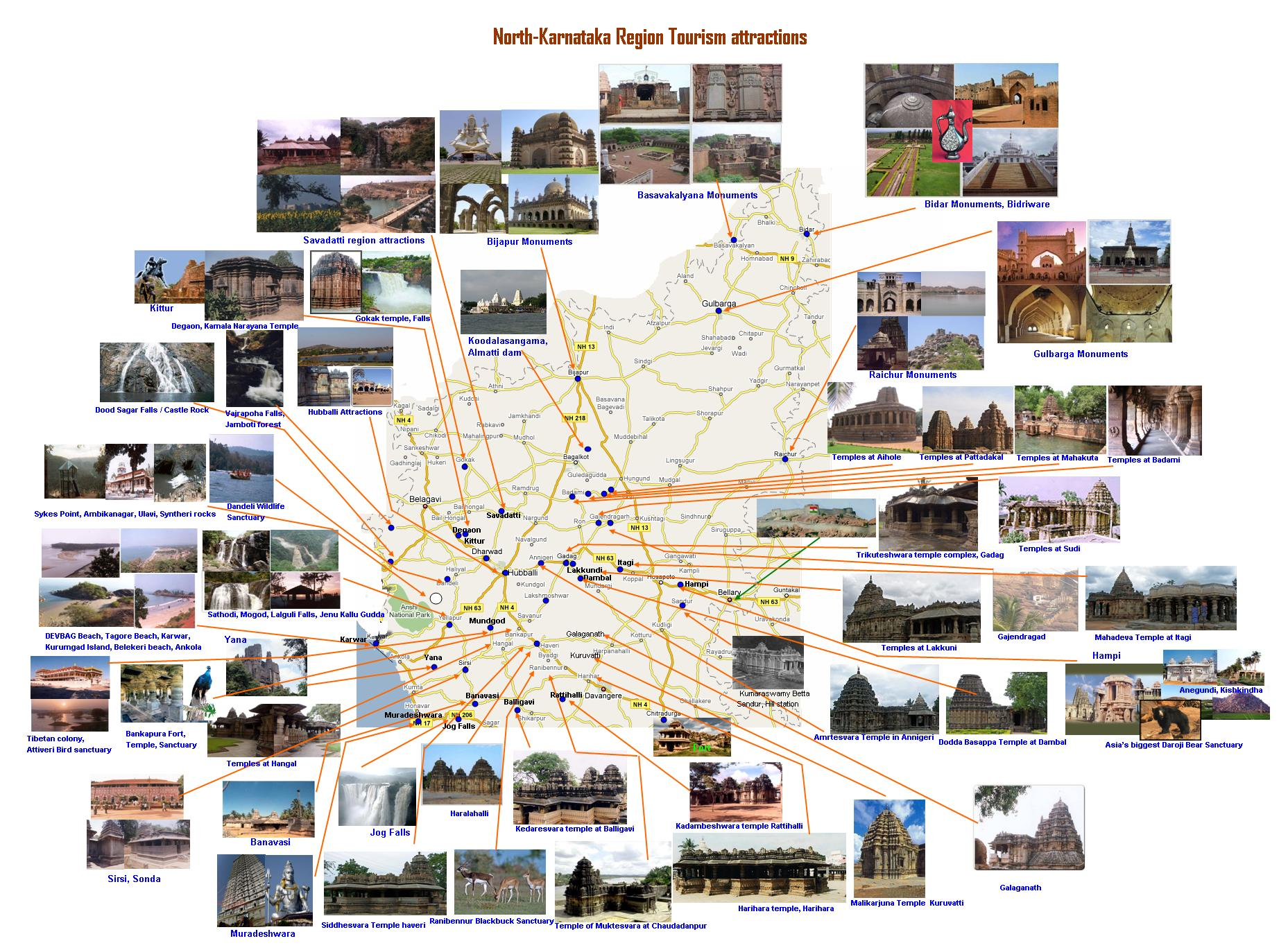
North Karnataka Region Tourism

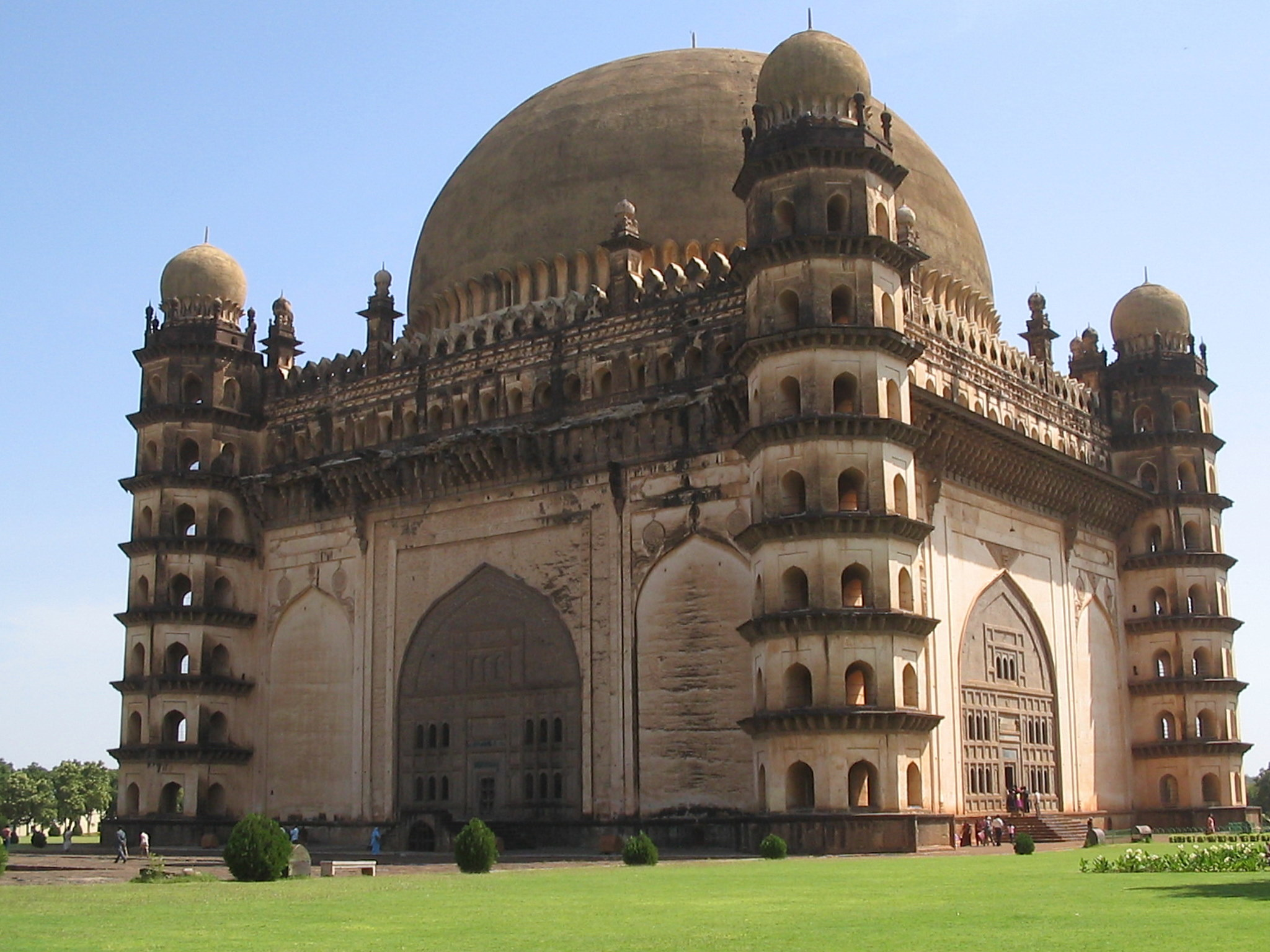
Gol Gumbaz Bijapur

North Karnataka has monuments that date back to the 5th century. Kannada royal capitals are also present here. Monuments constructed by the Badami Chalukya are located at Pattadakal, Aihole and Badami. Aihole is called the cradle of Indian architecture and has over 125 temples and monuments built between 450 and 1100 CE. Rashtrakuta monuments at Lokapura, Bilgi and Kuknur and Kalyani Chalukyas monuments built in Gadag style of architecture at Lakkundi, Gadag, Itagi (in Koppal District) and the Vijayanagar empire temples at Vijayanagara are some examples.

Hampi in Bellary district has ruins spread over an area of 125 km^{2}. There are fifty four world heritage monuments and six hundred and fifty national monuments (ASI). An additional three hundred monuments await protection. The Deccan sultanate monuments at Bijapur and Gulbarga show unique and discreet Hindu influences, and rival the Muslim monuments of North India. Archeologically important locations like Sannati, Kanaganahalli in Kalaburagi district have thrown more light on Buddhist centers of the 1st century BCE to 3rd century CE. The first ever statue of emperor Ashoka with his queens and a Prakrit inscription Rayo Ashoka (ASI) has been found.

Important locations surrounding Badami are Kudalasangama, Aihole, Pattadakal, Mahakuta and Banashankari. Regions surrounding Hampi can be visited from Hampi/Hosapete, or from Hubli. There are Kuknur, Itagi, Gadag, Lakkundi, Dambal, Haveri, Kaginele, Bankapura. Utsav Rock Garden, a museum in the Haveri district, features a cultural heritage and educational tourist center. It is notable for having over 2000 sculptures relating to the depiction of rural life.

=== World heritage centres ===
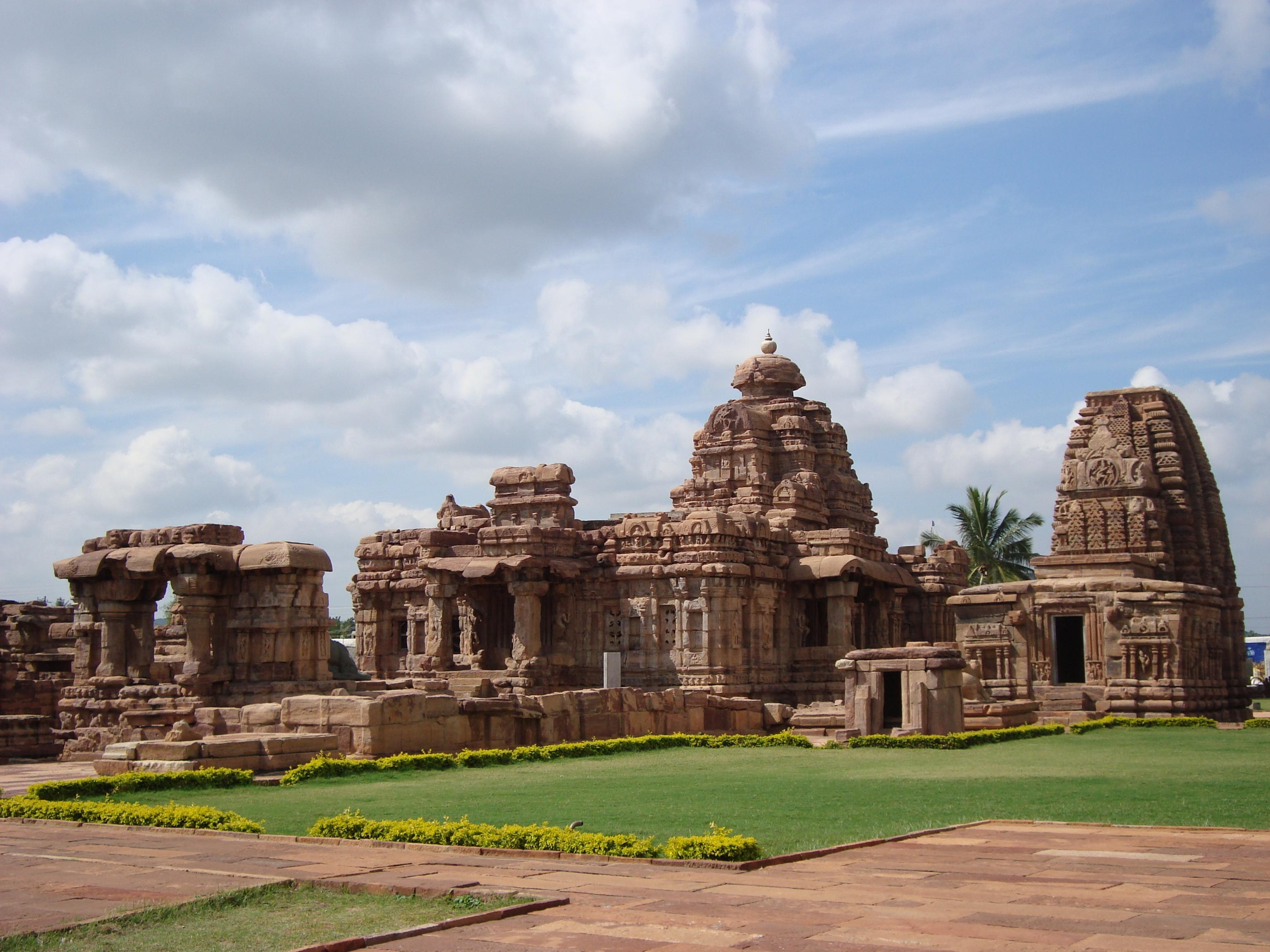
Mallikarjuna and Kasivisvanatha temples at Pattadakal

- Hampi, Bellary district: The site of the capital of Vijayanagara (1336) and formerly the seat of the Vijayanagar Empire. Foreign visitors in the 15th and 16th centuries described Hampi as being bigger than Rome. The city was destroyed and deserted in 1565 by marauding Moghul invaders and its ruins now lie scattered over a 26 sq. km area south of the river Tungabhadra. The rocky area near Anegundi to the north of the river has been identified as Kishkindha of Ramayana times. Hampi is home to a 29-foot-tall (8.8 m) monolithic Narasimha, which was installed by Krishnadevaraya in 1529. The remains of palaces and gateways can be seen.
- Group of 8th-century CE monuments, Pattadakal: Located on the banks of the river Malaprabha, Pattadakal was the second capital of the Chalukyas and contains examples of 7th- and 8th-century temple architecture. Four temples are in the south Indian Dravidian style, four in the North Indian Nagara style and the last one, the Papanatha temple represents a hybrid of the two styles. The oldest temples are the Sangameshwara, Mallikarjuna and Virupaksha Temples.

=== Chalukya ===
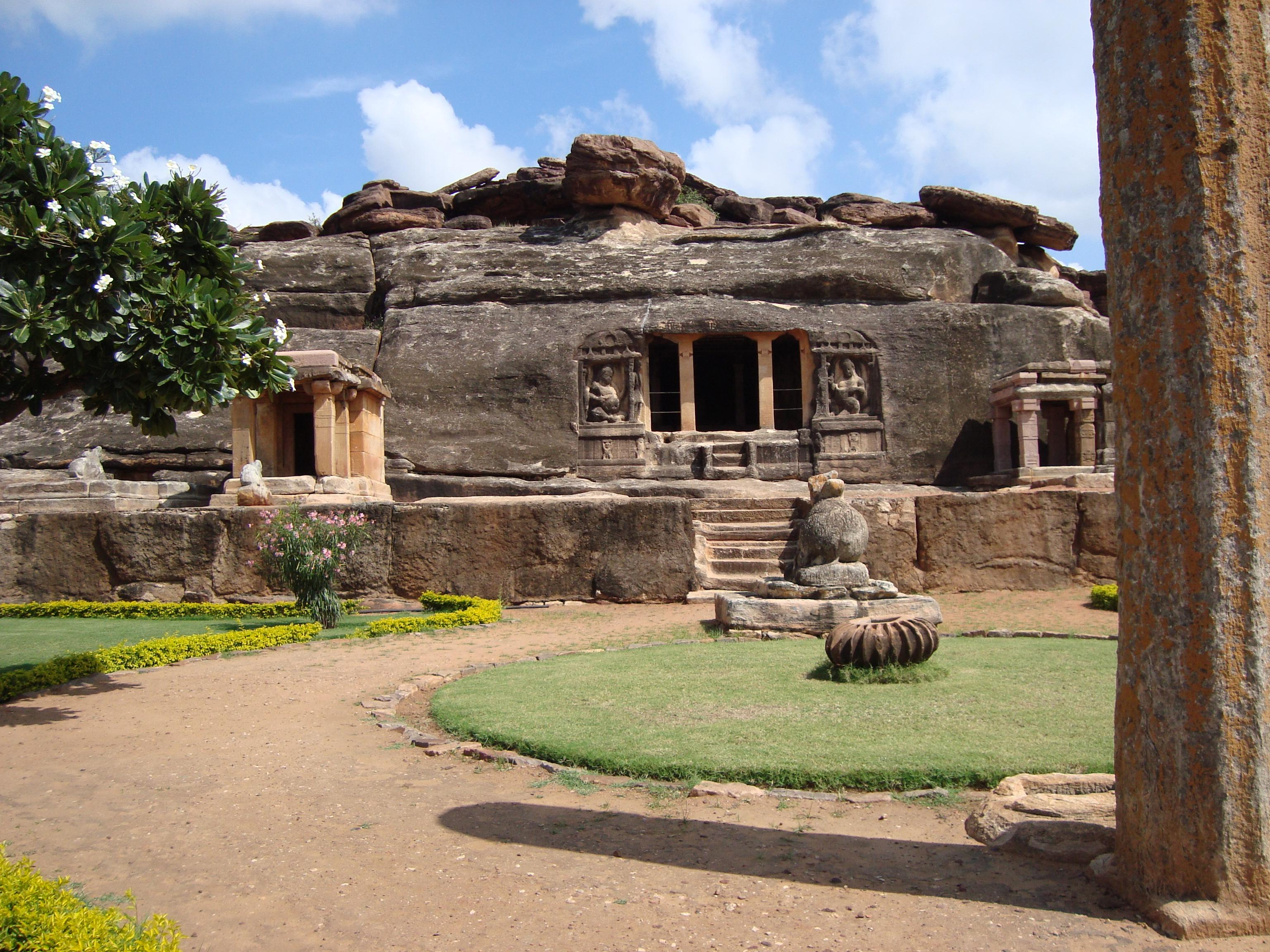
Ravana Phadi cave at Aihole near Pattadakal

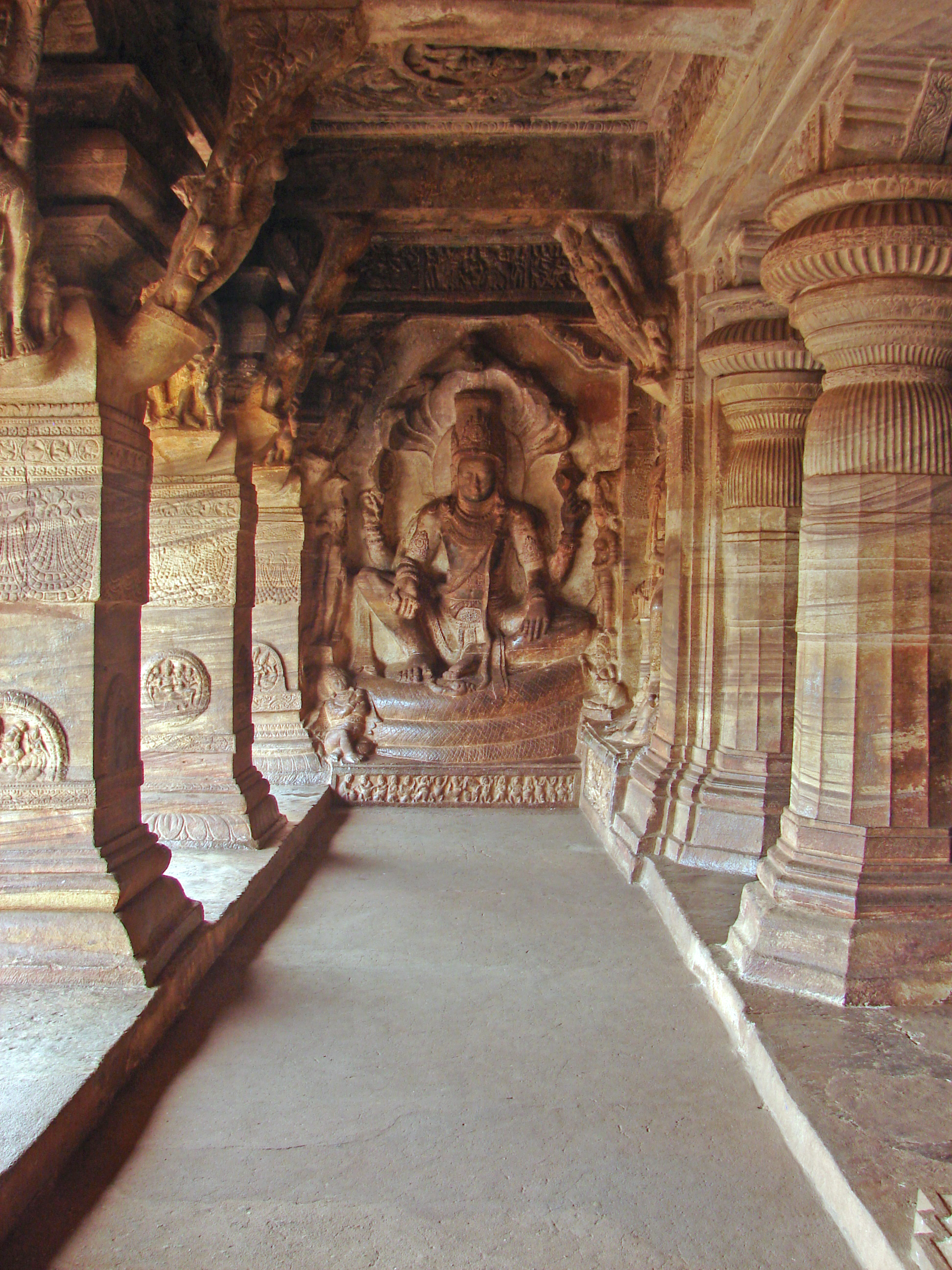
Cave temple 3 Badami

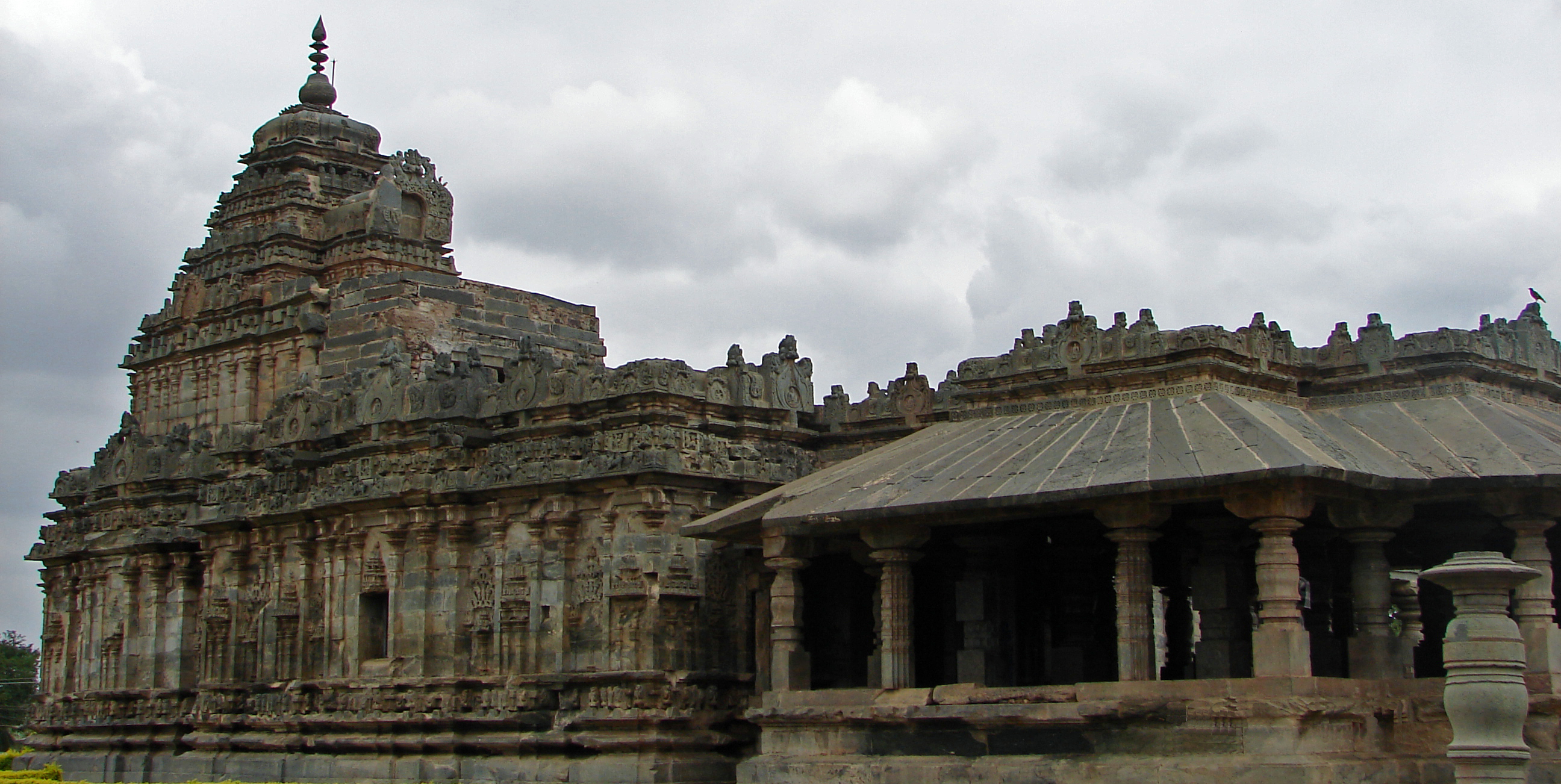
Brahma Jinalaya, Lakkundi

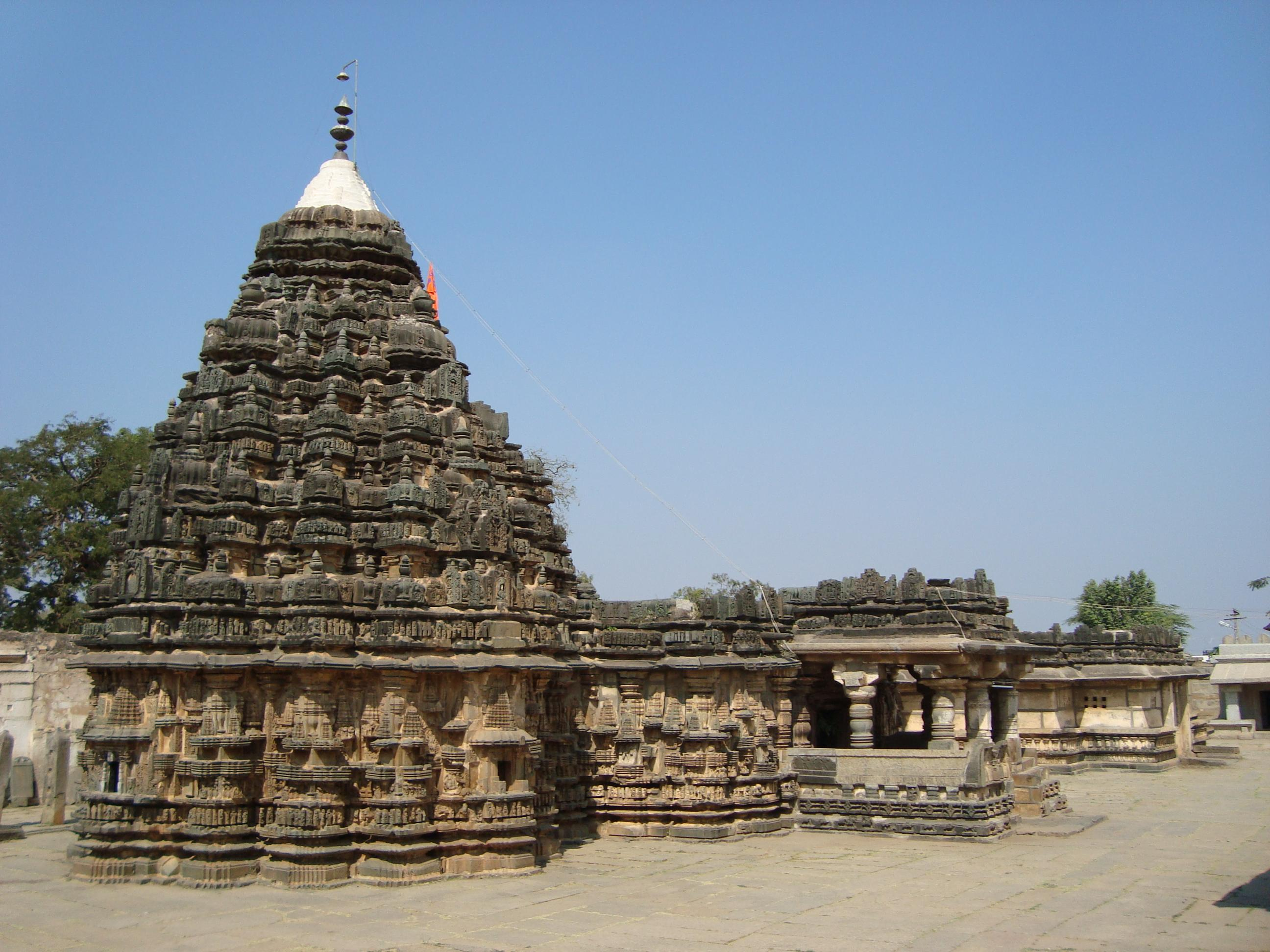
Someshwara temple at Lakshmeshwar, North Karnataka

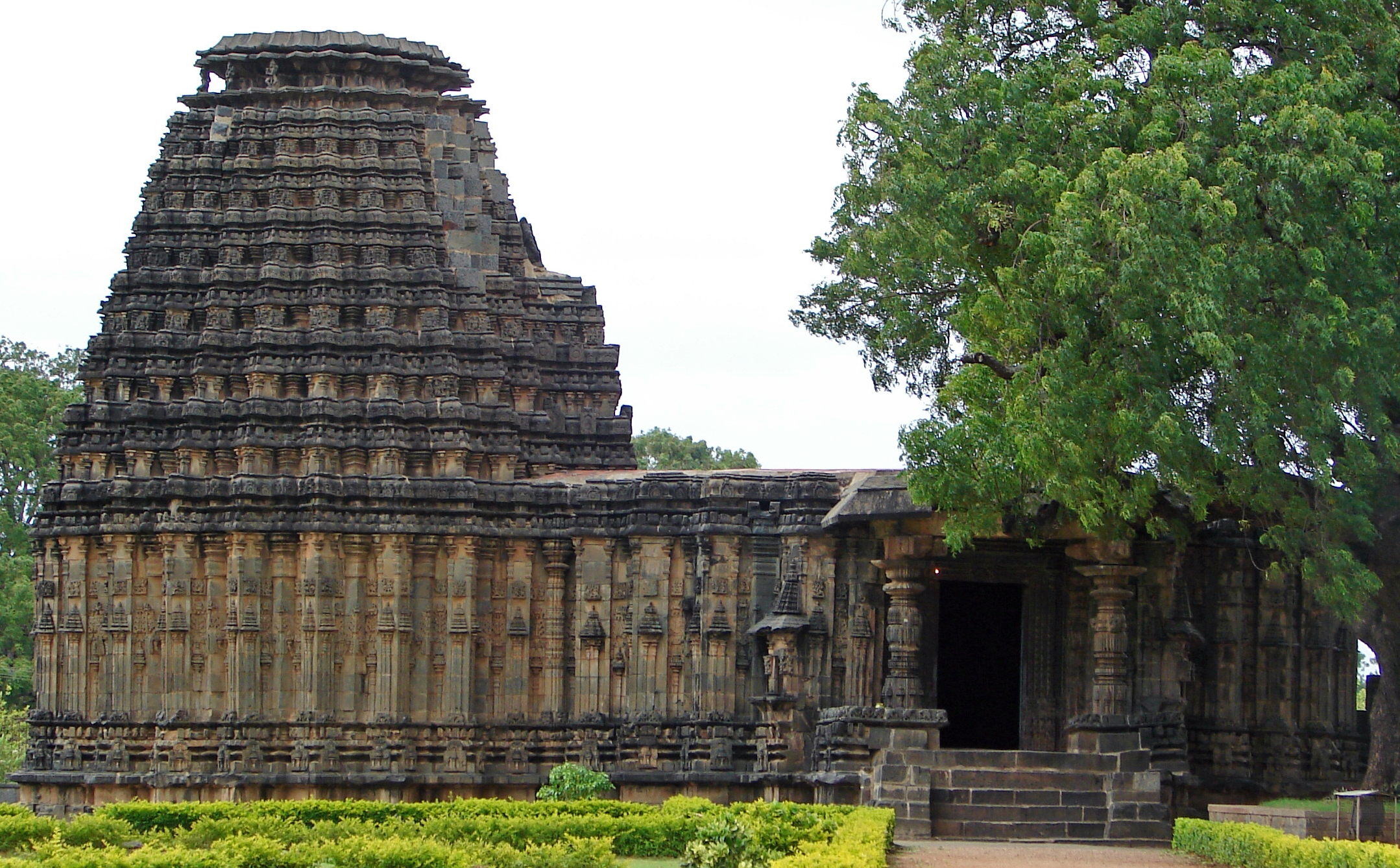
Doddabasappa Temple at Dambal, Gadag district

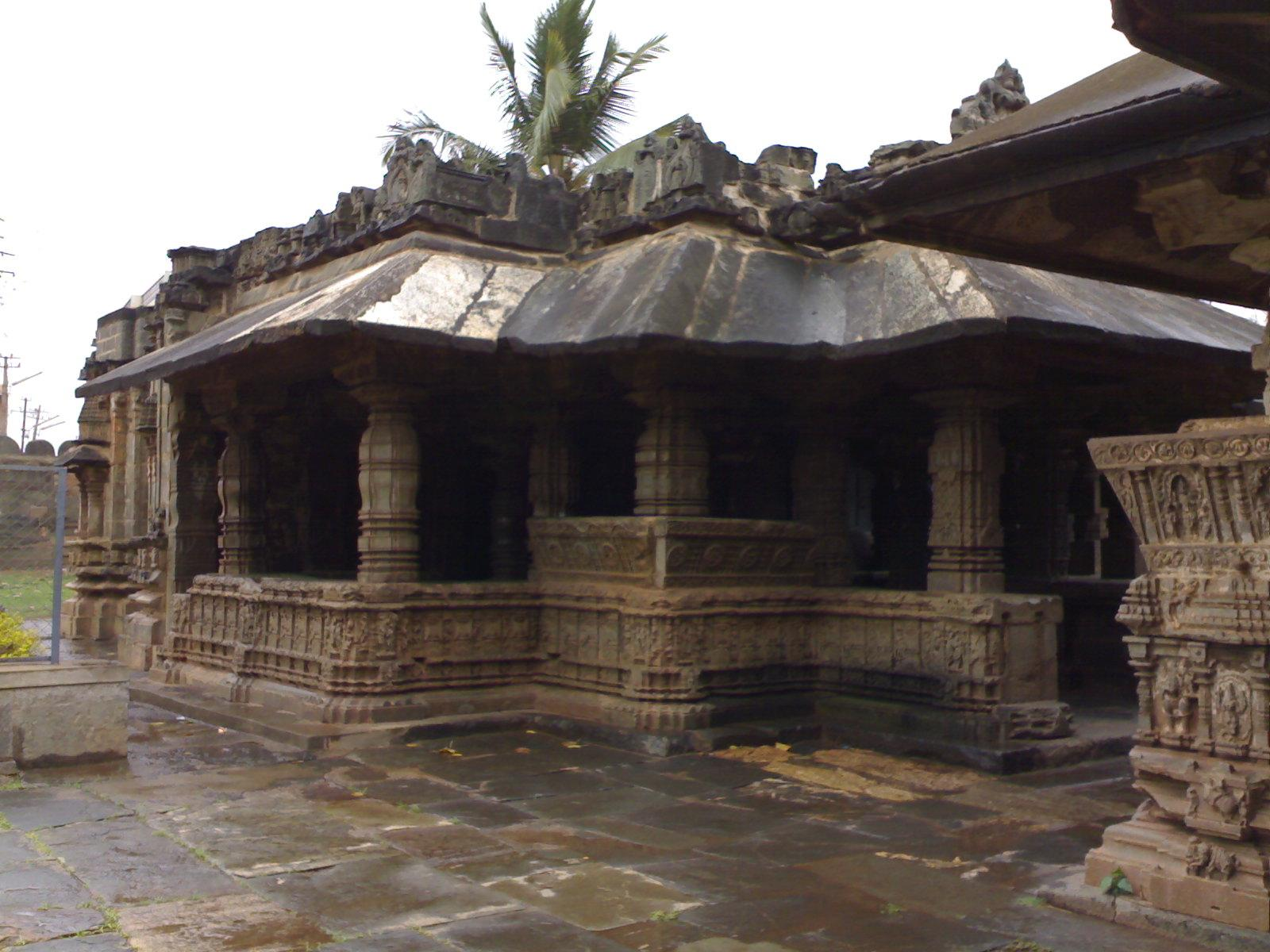
Trikuteshwara Temple complex at Gadag

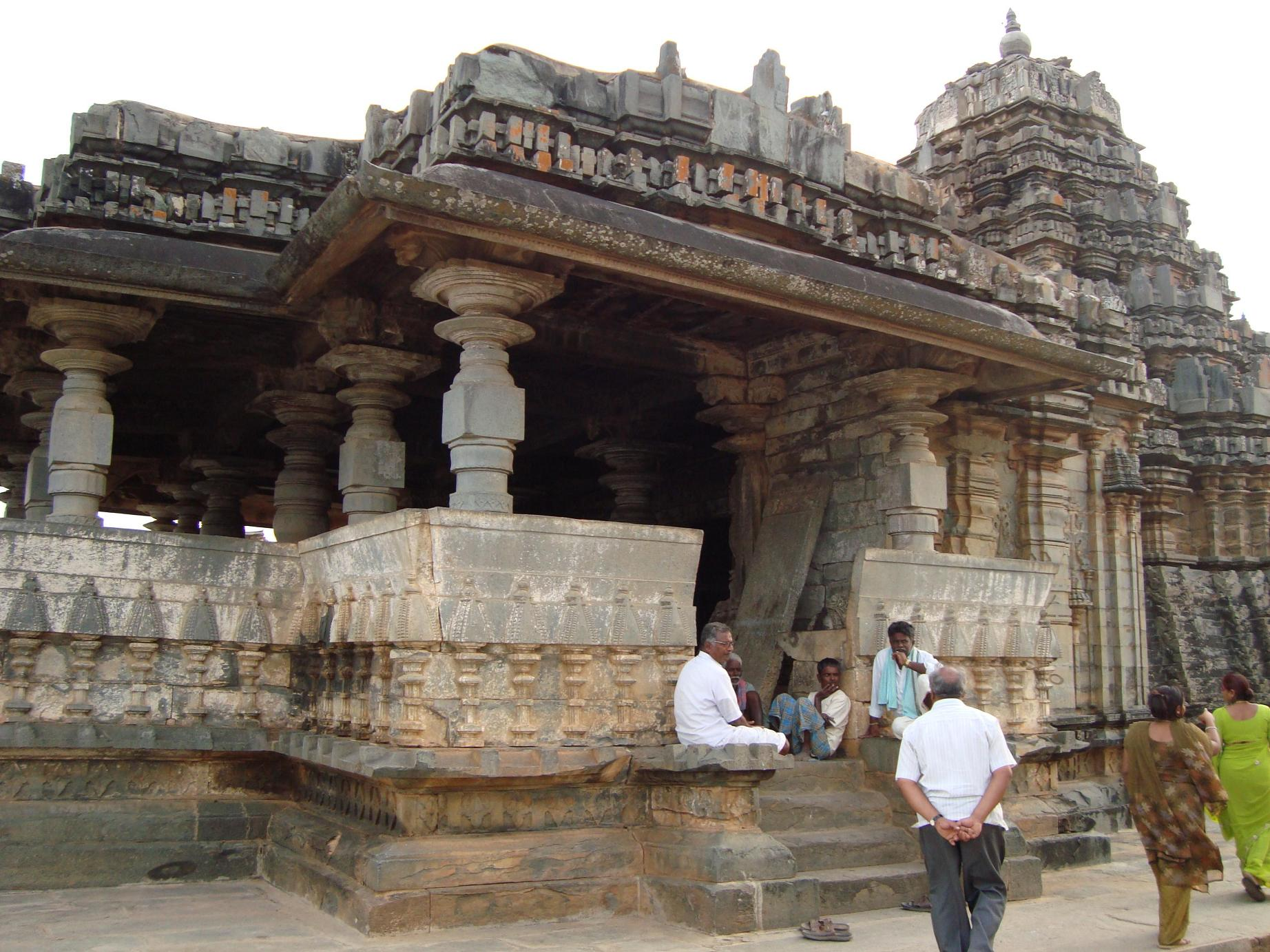
Galaganatha Galageshwara temple, Haveri District, North Karnataka

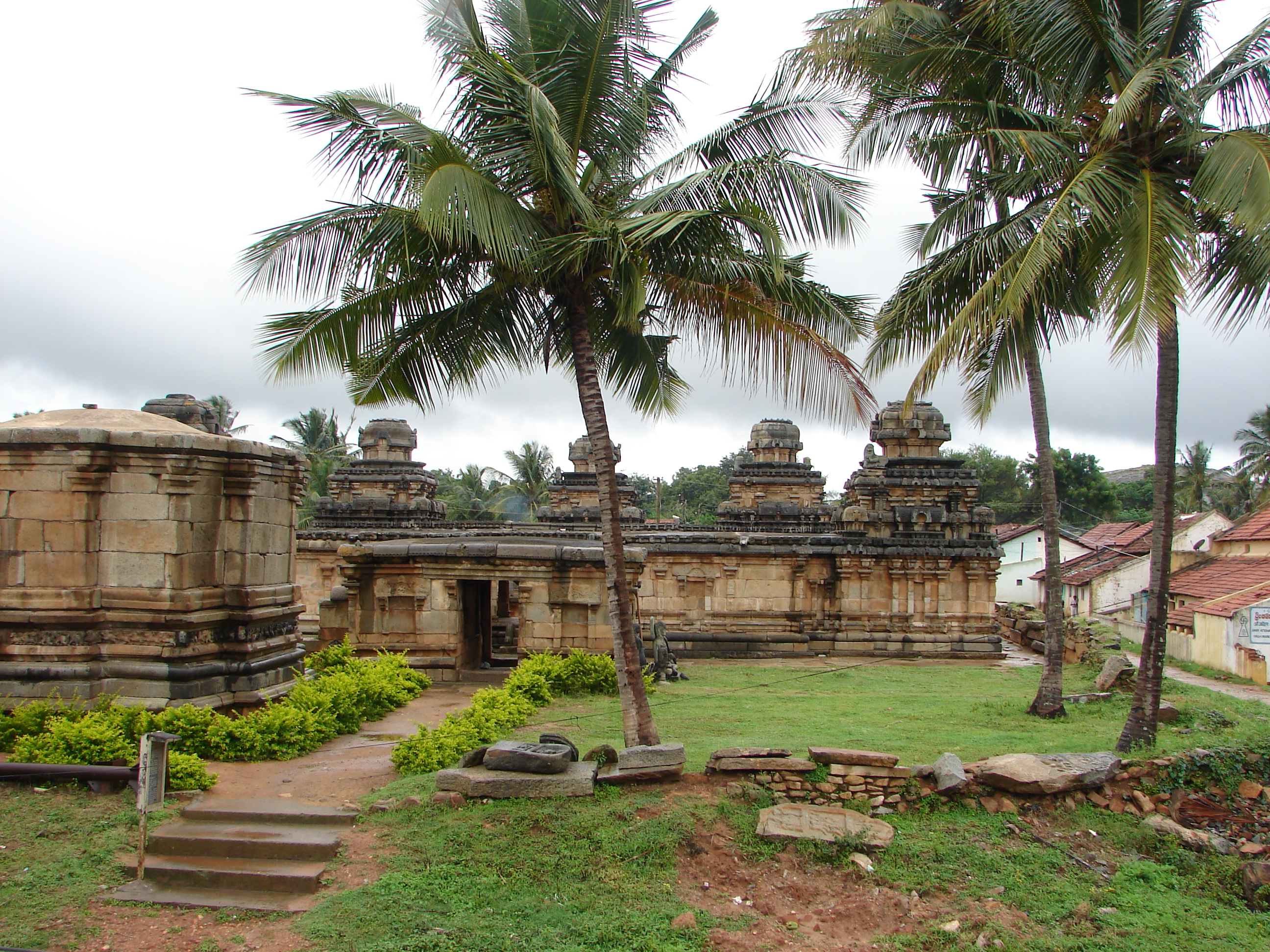
Panchakuta Basadi

- Aihole: a former Chalukya trading city. There are around 140 temples including examples of early Chalukya, Rashtrakuta and later Chalukya dynasties from the 6th to 12th centuries. It has a Jain and Vedic rock-cut shrine, both of around the 6th century. It has a Durga temple and pictures of the Tirthankaras. The meguti on a slope is a jaina basti with a Buddhist two-story rock-cut shrine below it and an Aihole inscription from Pulakeshin 2 above it. All the other Jain and Buddhist temples are built of stone and resemble Hindu temples. The temples were built during the Middle Ages before any style was established and hence there is a mixture of styles.
- Badami: the capital of the early Chalukyas in the 6th century, is at the mouth of a ravine between two rocky hills. The town is known for its cave temples (all carved out of sandstone hills). Badami have four caves, the cave temple dedicated to Vishnu is the largest. In front of the cave temple, there is a reservoir called Aghastya Teertha dotted with temples on its bank. Among them, two are dedicated to Vishnu, one to Shiva and the fourth is a Jain Temple. Carvings in the cave temples display the Hindu gods, Narashima and Hari Hara. The temples also have paintings on the ceiling and bracket figures on the piers.
- Basavana Bagewadi: It is 43 east of Bijapur. In the 12th century, Saint Basaveshwara was born here. It was an agrahara. The main temple here is in the Chalukya style and it was called as Sangamantha in records. The Samadhis of Siddharameshwara and Gurupadeshwara of the Inchageri school of spiritual pursuit are seen here.
- Basavakalyana, Bidar District: former capital of the Later Chalukyas. It has an old fort renovated by the Bahamani containing an Archaeological Museum. Few Chalukya or Kalachuri remains exist, except the Chalukya Narayanapur temple, in the outskirts of the town. There is a modern Basaveshwara temple, Prabhudevara Gadduge, Jurist of the Kalyani Chalukyas period. Vijnaneshwara's Cave, Madivala Machiah's Pond, Akka Nagamma's Cave, fully renovated Siddheshwara temple and a new structure called Anubhava Mantapa, the Qaji's mosque and Raja Bagh Sawar Dargah.
- Annigeri (30 km from Hubli): It has an Amriteshwara temple of the time of the Kalyani Chalukyas. It was the birthplace of great Kannada Poet Pampa and there is a Jain basadi of Parshwanatha. It was once a headquarters of Belvola-300. It was the capital of Chalukya Someshwara 4. In addition to Veerashaiva Mathas; there is a ruined Banashankari Temple and seven mosques and also an ancient Veerabhadra temple.
- Bankapura (80 km from Dharwad): Under Chalukya, many temples were raised in the city including the Nagareshwara temple in the fort and another chalukya temple called Siddheshwara. Ali Adilshahi destroyed many temples in 1567. There is a mosque in the fort.
- Dambal (21 km from Gadag): It was a Buddhist centre. There are two notable chalukya temples called Doddabasappa Temple and Somewshwara Temple. Doddabassapa as polygonal star shaped temple garbhagriha and fine sculptural representations and huge nandi Temple. Someshwara could have been an old basati. The temple has a 400-year-old vast tank. There is an old Ganapathi image in an old ruined fort with a similar statue in a small shrine.
- Haveri: This town has the Siddheshvara Temple, built in the 12th century. It is situated in the heart of the city of Haveri, inside the garden.
- Gadag: A twin city municipality 55 km from Hubli-Dharward. It is a great centre of Kalyani Chalukyas art with the large Trikuteshwara temple. It has the Sri Lakshmi Venkateshwara temple situated in Venkatapura Taluk near Sortur, Gadag District. The Temple was renovated by Brahmananda Swami, a devotee of Gondavalekar Maharaj, a sage from Gondavale. It was later expanded by Kalyani Chalukyas into a vast complex. The complex has triple shrines once housing Shiva, Brahma and Surya. The Saraswathi temple has shining decorative pillars, and a Saraswathi image that is notable as one of the largest examples of Chalukya art. The place has Someshwara and Rameshwara temples of Chalukya style. It has a Veeranarayana temple of Chalukya times.
- Lakkundi, 10 km from Gadag, Gadag District: Temples that can be visited include Brahma Jinalaya, Kasivisvesvara and Kalyani.
- Someshwara temple complex Lakshmeshwar in the Shirahatti Taluk, Gadag District, North Karnataka. The temple complex has the Someshwara temple of Shiva along with other similar temples inside the fort-like compound.
- Galaganatha Galageshwara temple is located in the Haveri District. The temple has a large open hall and pyramidal shaped Garbhagudi. The temple is situated along the Tungabhadra river.
- Chaudayyadanapura Mukteshwara temple, near Ranebennur in Haveri District, North Karnataka
- Mahadeva Temple (Itagi) in the Koppal district, North Karnataka, built during 1112 CE. This temple is an example of dravida articulation with a nagara superstructure. This Temple is also called Devalayagala Chakravarti in Kannada (Emperor among Temples).
- Panchakuta Basadi, Kambadahalli in Mandya district was built in the 8th century. This temple is one of the finest examples of South Indian Dravidian architecture of the Western Ganga.
- Shambulinga Temple, Kundgol is about 15 km from Hubli-Dharwad. This place is famous for Hindustani music and Huge Shambulinga Temple.
- Hooli Panchalingeshwara Temple
- Lakshmeshwar has Someshwara temple complex, Jain Basadis.
- Kudalasangama has a Chalukya Sangamanatha temple. It is a Karma Bhumi of Basavanna. The nearby Almatti Dam has got North Karnataka's biggest Rock Garden.

==== Rashtrakuta dynasty ====
- Malkhed, Kalaburagi district
- Naregal, Gadag District
- Belgaum Fort

==== Kadamba dynasty ====
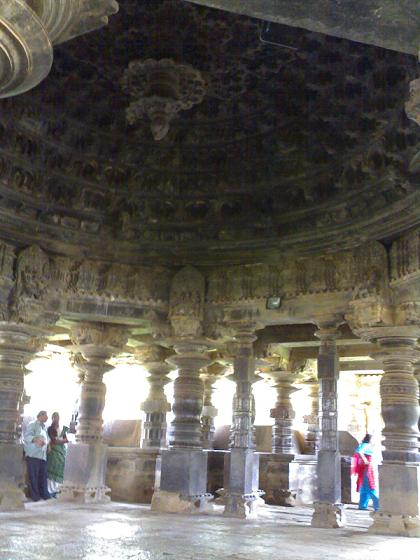
Large domical ceiling in the main hall at Tarakeshwara temple Hangal

- Halasi

The second capital of the Kadambas of Banavasi. The huge Bhuvaraha Narasimha temple has tall images of Varaha, Narasimha, Narayana and Surya. Halasi has a fort and temples of Gokarneshswara, Kapileshwara, Swarneshwara and Hatakeshwara.

- Hangal

Hanagal was the capital of Hangal Kadambas, feudatories of Kalyani Chalukyas. It was mentioned as Panungal in records and identified by tradition with Viratanagara of Mahabharatha days. It is on the left bank of the Dharma River. The Tarakeshwara temple here is a huge structure with series of images and polished tall Chalukya pillars. The other temples are Virabhadra, Billeshwara and Ramalinga etc. There is a Veerashaiva Kumaraswamy Matha here.

- Banavasi

Banavasi was the capital of Kadambas. The place is on the bank of the Varada river and its laterite fort is surrounded by the river at its three sides. Ashoka is said to have sent his missionaries to 'Vanavasa'. Banavasi also contains Buddhist brick monuments. Chutu prince Nagashri built a Buddhist Vihara, a tank and installed a Naga image at the place according to a Prakrit record at the place. There is also a monument at Banavasi, Mudhukeshvara temple and also Kadamba Nagara Shikhara is seen on the garbhagriha of this temple. Records here indicate that Buddhism and Jainism were popular.

==== Deccan Sultanates ====
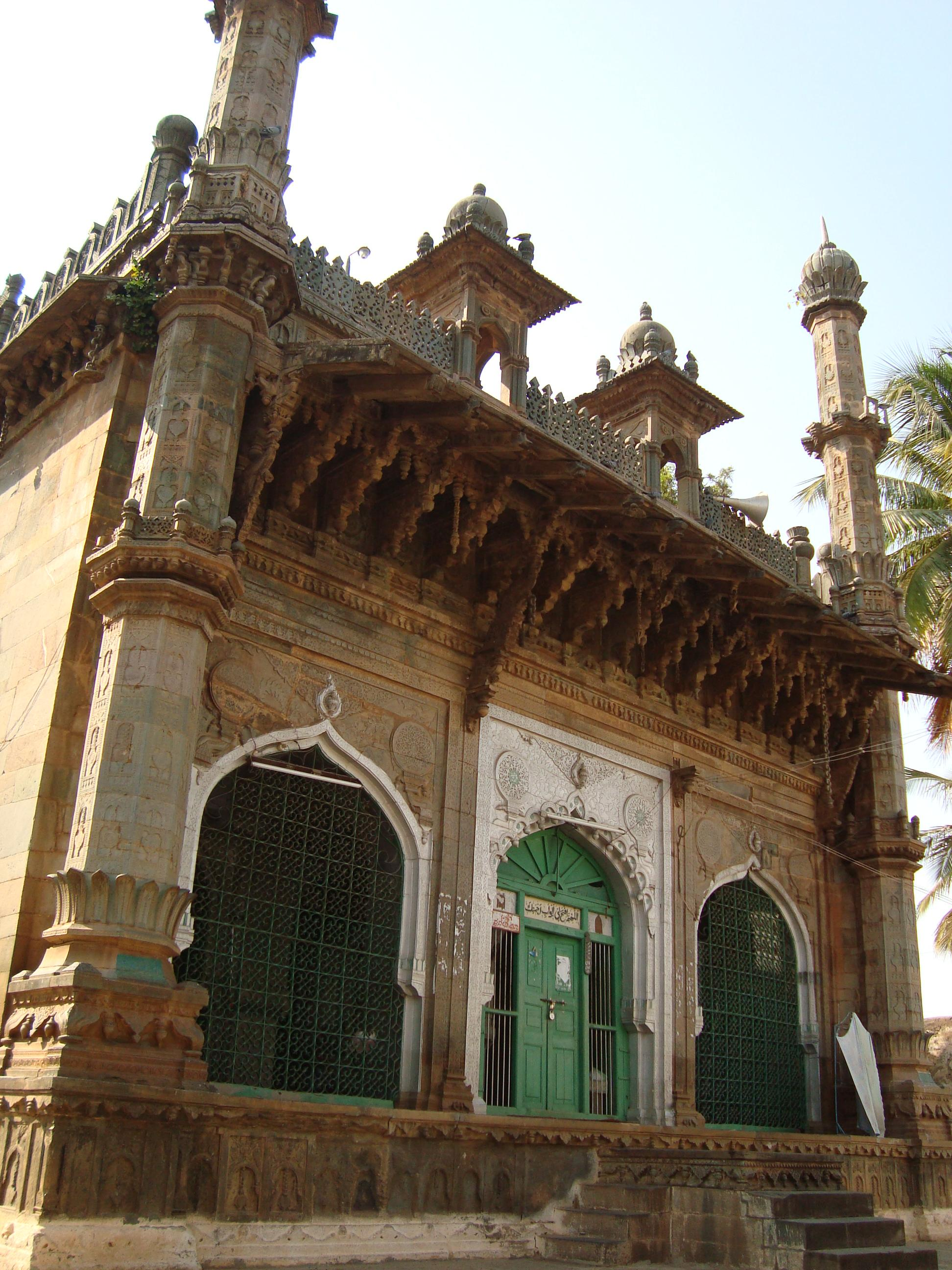
Jumma Masjid at Lakshmeshwar, North Karnataka

- Bijapur: The former capital of the Adil Shahi Kings (1489–1686). Gol Gumbaz is the mausoleum of Muhammed Adil Shah and was built in 1659. It houses the world's second largest dome, unsupported by pillars. Malik-e-Maidan is a 55-ton cannon perched on a platform. The head of the cannon is fashioned into the shape of a lion whose jaws are trying to devour an elephant.
- Bidar: a centre for Bidriware. It is the location of the tombs of 30 rulers including the Chaukhandi of Hazrat Khalil-Ullah Shah and Sultan Ahmed Shah Al Wali Bahamani from the Bahamani dynasty.
- Gulbarga
- Raichur
- Lakshmeshwar: The Jumma Masjid, built during the rule of Adilshahi, has a large crowning onion dome and Koranic scripture written in gold.

==== Rattas ====
- Saundatti: The town proper has a fort on the hill built during the 17th century, by Sirasangi Desai, with eight bastions. It was the capital of Rattas who later shifted their headquarters to Belgaum. There are two temples of Ankeshwara, Puradeshwara, Mallikarjuna, Venkateshwara and the Veerabhadra. The Renukasagar waters touch the outskirts of Saundatti. Tourist attractions of this region are Hooli Panchalingeshwara temple, Renuka (Yallamma) temple, Saundatti Fort, Parasgad Fort, Navilateertha.

==== Jain Basadis ====
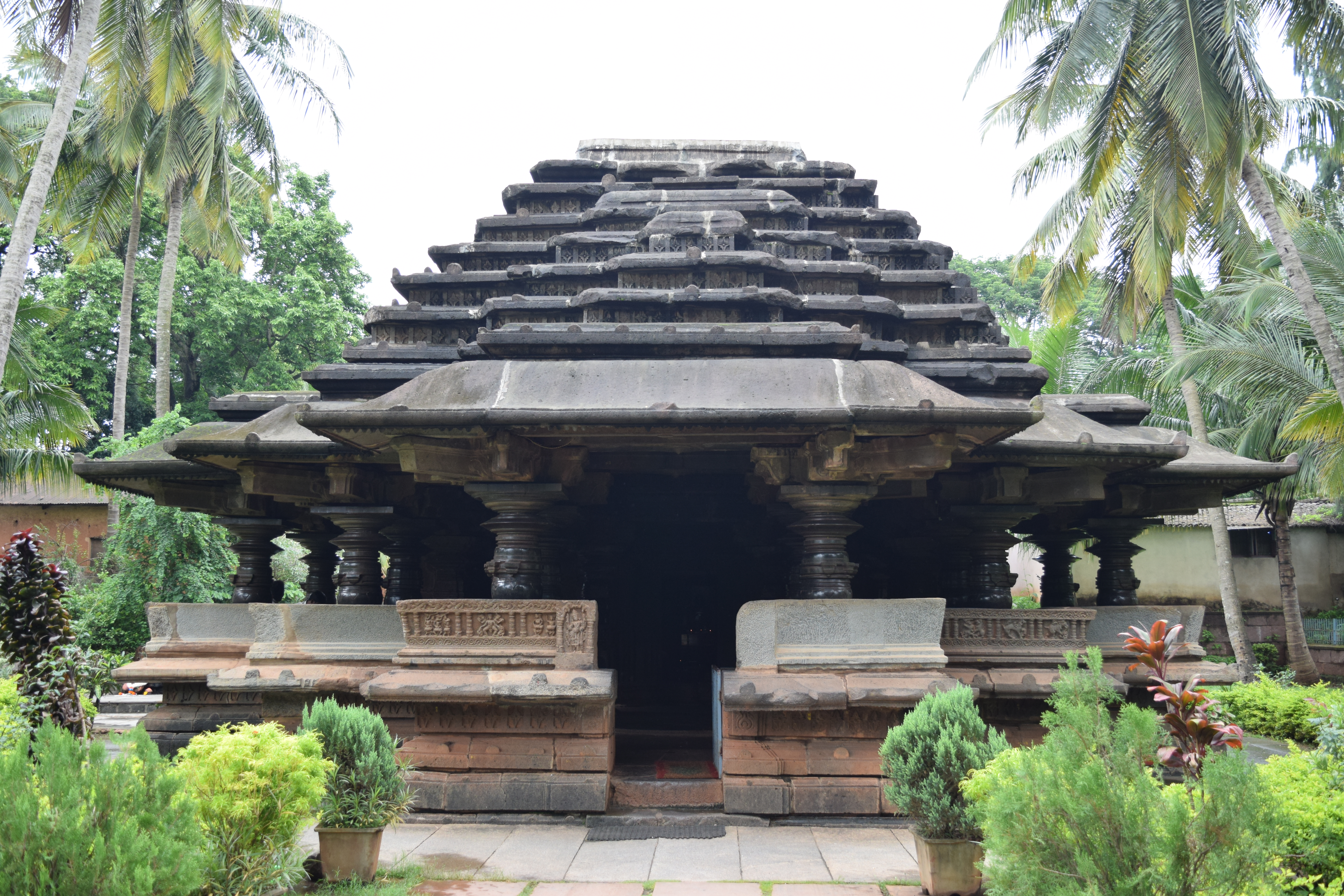
Kamal Basadi

Jainism has a long history in Karnataka. Belgaum District has the Kamala basadi in Chalukya style in the Belgaum Fort. The ancient centre Tavanidi near Nippani and newly created centre at Shedbal, where 24 Tirthankaras in white marble have been installed in a cluster.

The Chalukyas of Badami built cave temples at Badami, Pattadkal and Aihole. Puligere was a strong centre of religious activities of the Jain monks during this era.

Lakkundi in Gadag District has a large Brahma Jinalaya of Chalukya style, built by a noble lady, Attimabbe.

Navagraha Jain Temple at Varur near Hubli is one of the major pilgrimage. The temple features a 61 feet (18.6 m) tall monolithic idol of the Shri 1008 Bhagavan Parshvanatha and the smaller statues of the other 8 Jain teerthankaras.

==== Buddhist temples ====
- Tara Bhagavati temples, Balligavi, Shiralkoppa
- Koliwada and Dambal, Gadag district
- Sannati and Kanaganahalli, Kalaburagi district: remains of the razed stupas and a Buddhist plaques of Satavahana period were unearthed recently
- Aihole: Viharas
- Badami: Buddhist remains from the Badami Chalukyas period were found between caves two and three
- Mundgod, Uttara Kannada: Tibetan settlements with multi-coloured stupas and painted prayer halls
- Gulbarga: Two new viharas

==== Shiva temples ====
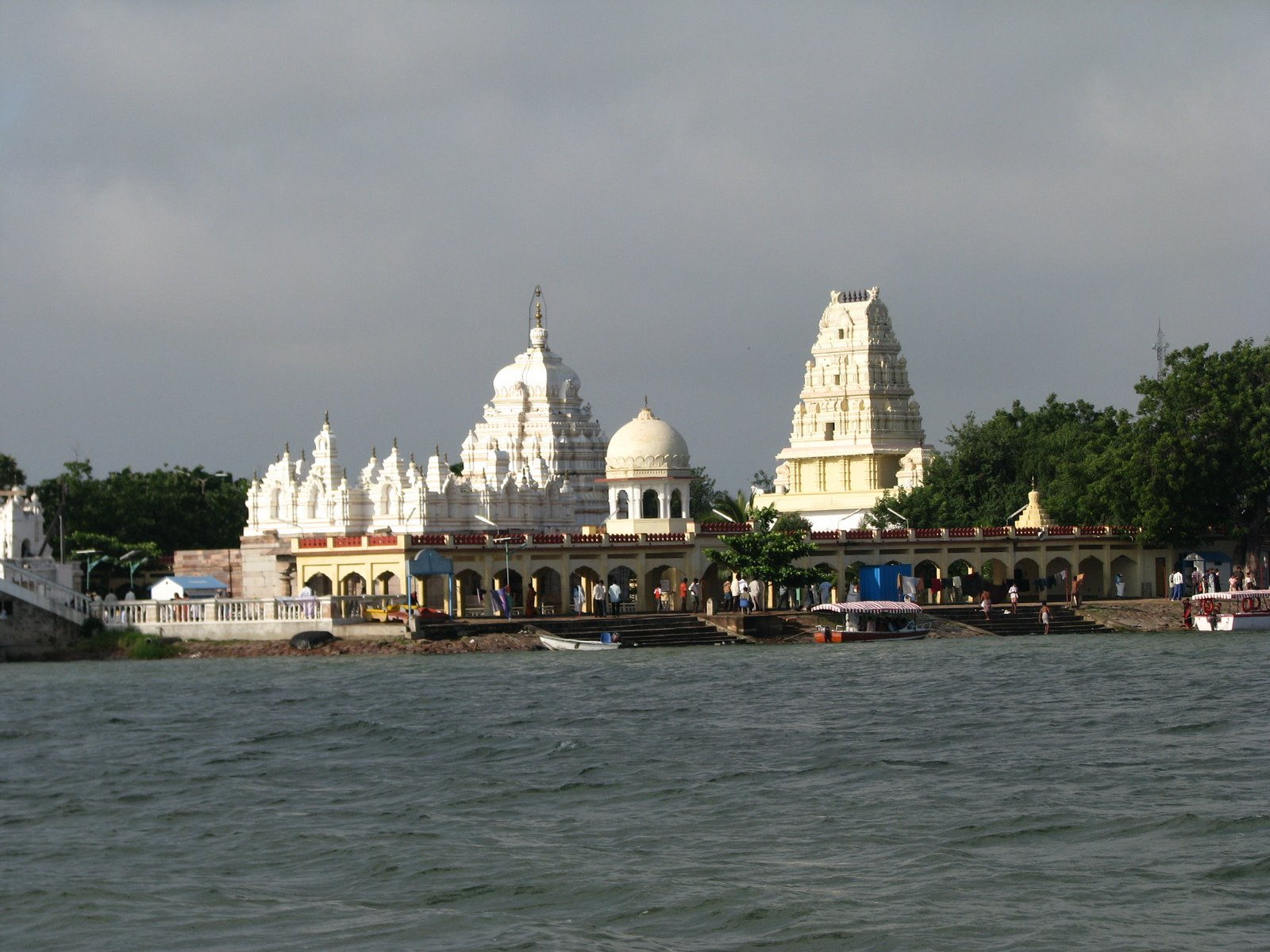
Kudalasangama in Bagalkot district

Gokarna is an all-India centre where the Atmalinga (Mahabaleshwara) of Shiva, brought by Ravana is believed to have been installed. Nearby is Murdeshwar where a huge modern Shiva temple in the Dravidian Style has been raised, renovating an ancient shrine. Both the places are on the sea-shore in Uttara Kannada. At Hampi is the Virupaksha Temple, venerated by generations of poets, scholars, kings and commoners.

The Shiva temple at Kudalasangama in Bagalkot District is associated with Saint Basaveshwara. Equally remarkable pieces of art are the Virupaksha and the Mallikarjuna at Pattadakal in Bagalkote.

The Veerashaivas have many venerated places, either associated with Basaveshwara or his contemporaries. Basavana Bagewadi was his place of birth and Kudala Sangama the place of his spiritual practices, are in Bijapur and Bagalkot dts. The latter is at the confluence of the river Krishna and the Malaprabha. Basava Kalyana (Kalyani), the ancient Chalukya capital in Bidar District was the place where he conducted his socio-religious movement. Ulavi in Uttara Kannada, a quiet place amidst forests, has the samadhi of Chennabasavanna, Basaveshwara's nephew. Belgami (Balligavi), the Chalukya art centre in Shimoga dt. is identified as the birthplace of Allama Prabhu and Uduthadi near it, is the native place of Akka Mahadevi. Later Veerashaiva saints are associated with many places. Kodekal (Gulbarga dt.) Basavanna temple, Kadakola Madivallajja Matha, Sharana Basaveshwara temple and Dasoha Math at Gulbarga are few more places of worship.

Athani has the samadhi of the Veerashaiva Saint Shivayogi. Some of the outstanding Veerashaiva Mathas are seen at Naganur near Bailhongal and Kalmatha in Belgaum, Durudundeshwara Matha at Arabhavi and Mahantaswamy Matha at Murgod are in Belgaum dt. Murugha Matha (Dharwad), Annadaneshwara Matha (Mundargi), Tontadarya Matha at Gadag and Dambal, Moorusavira Matha at Hubli, Murugha Matha and Hukkeri Matha (Haveri), Taralabalu Matha at Sirigere, Murugharajendra Matha at Chitradurga, Banthanala Shivajogi Matha at Chadachan and Mahantaswamy Matha (Ilkal) are equally notable. The samadhi of Sharanabasappa Appa at Gulbarga.

==== Shakti Sthala ====
The following places are visited by devotees of Shakti

- Chandralamba, Sannati, Gulbarga
- Bagyawanti, Ghattaragi
- Mayavva, Chinchli
- Sri Renuka Yallamma, Savadatti
- Banashankari, Badami, Bagalkote districts
- Sri Malatesh and Malas sambha (Guddadayya), Devaragudda, Ranebennur
- Sri Honnamma devi, Honnathi, Ranebennur
- Sri Bayalu Shaneshwara, Ranebennur
- Bhuvaneshwari, Hampi
- Varadahalli, Sagara, Karnataka
- Sigandur, Sagara, Karnataka
- Marikamba, Sagara, Karnataka
- Marikamba, Sirsi, Uttara Kannada
- Durga Parameshwari Kateel, Dakshina Kannada
- Mookambika Kollur, Udupi District
- Mysore Karnataka, Mysore District

==== Temple tanks ====
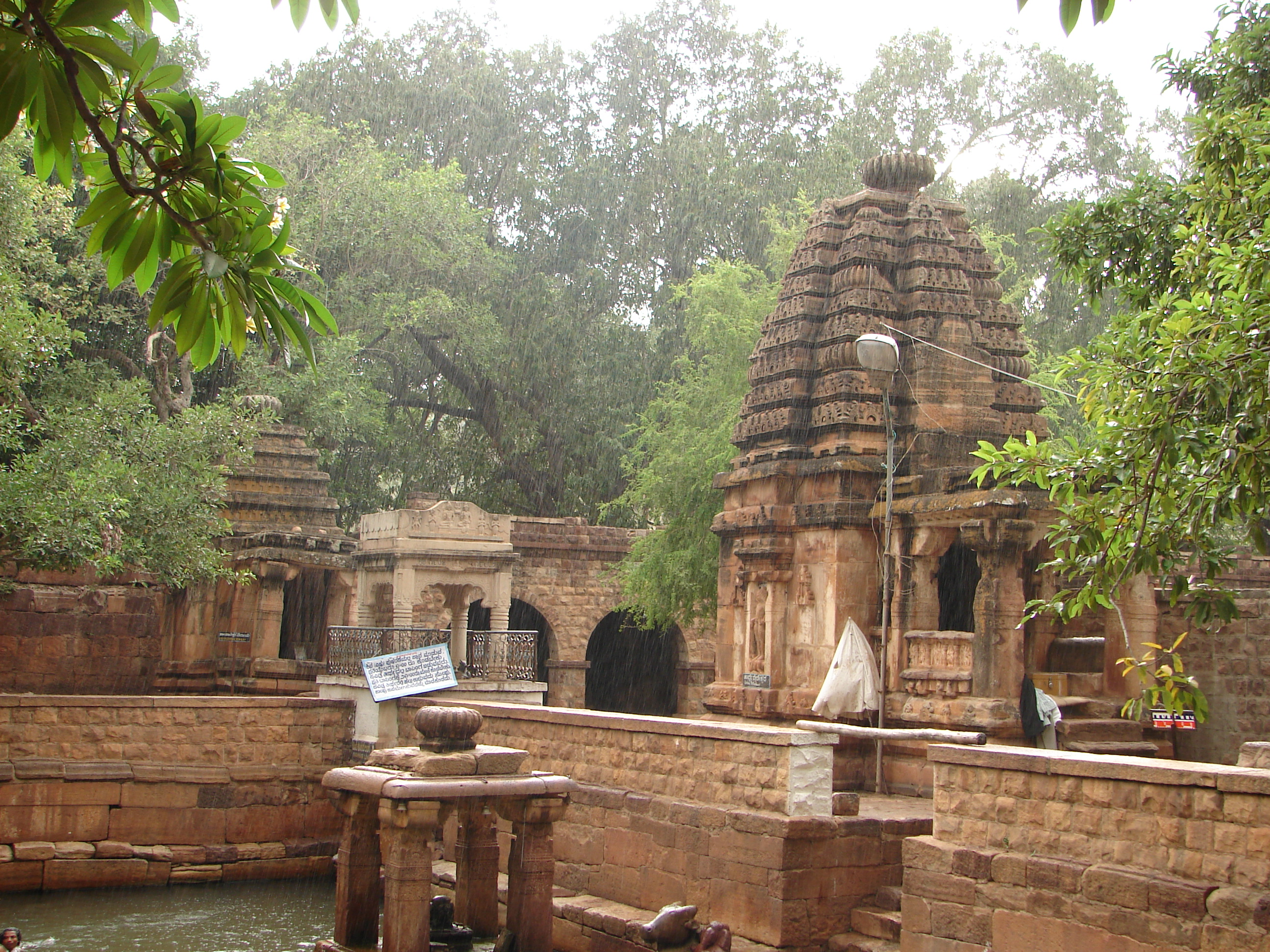
Mahakuta Temple tank near Badami

- Agastya Teertha, Badami
- Mahakuta group of temples, near Badami
- Banashankari, near Badami
- Lakkundi, near Gadag
- Hampi

== Coastal Karnataka ==
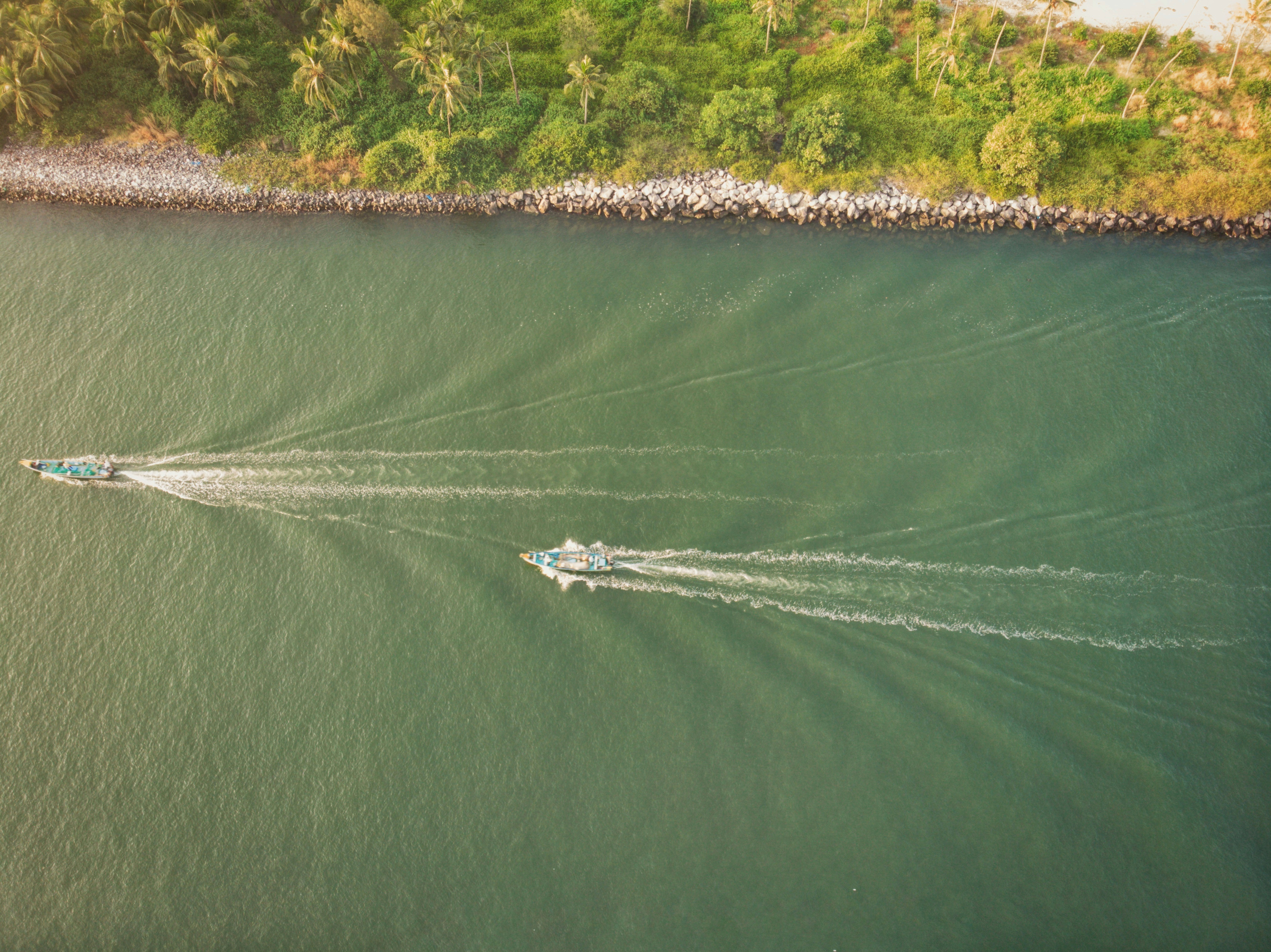
Aerial view of Malpe beach near Udupi

Coastal Karnataka is the stronghold of Hindu and Jain pilgrimage spots with Udupi and its many temples being the centre of Dvaita philosophy, Gokarna is known for Vedic studies, Sringeri has the first of the Shankaracharya mathas and is important for its Advaita philosophy, Karkala and Mudabidri are well known places of Jain worship and Vaishnava rituals. Exquisite Vijayanagar temples built in Chalukya – Malabar region combinational style are seen in Bhatkal, Kumta, Shirali etc. The warm beaches of Karnataka are mostly unspoiled.

Jamboti, 20 km south-west of Belgaum, has popular evergreen hilltop forests.

Karnataka is blessed with over 300 km of pristine coastal stretch. Netrani Island of Uttara Kannada is known for its coral reefs. St. Mary's Island, a few kilometres from Udupi has basalt rock formations. Sunny beaches at places like Malpe, Murdeshwar, Maravanthe, Gokarna, Kumta have spectacular mountains to the east. Agumbe, Kodachadri hills, Kemmangundi, are just a few of many hill stations that straddle the coast providing tourists sun and greenery. Unlike many crowded hill stations in South India, the hill stations of Karnataka are still mostly undiscovered and pristine.

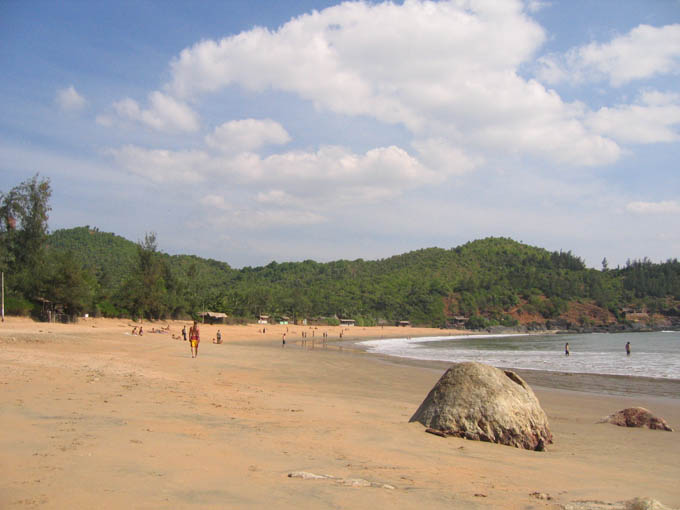
Om beach, near Gokarna, North Karnataka

- Gokarna: The Coastal town of Gokarna is a pilgrimage centre as well as a centre of Sanskrit learning, 56 km from Karwar. It has the Mahabaleswar Temple with the 'Atmalinga' dedicated to Shiva. There is an enormous chariot, which is taken out in a procession on Shiva's birthday in February. The Tambraparni Teertha here is considered sacred to perform obsequies of the dead. There is a beach called Om Beach.
- Udupi: One of the holy place and it is 58 km from Mangalore. The Krishna temple here is founded by Acharya Madhwa during the 14th century. He founded eight mathas to conduct the services of Lord Krishna in turns. Paryaya festival is held once in two years in January. The place has Kadiyali Durga temple, Ambalapadi Shakti temple, Raghavendra Matha and the Venkataraman swamy temple. Malpe is the port near here. It has a beach and the Vadabhandeshwara temple of Balarama.
- Thantrady : One of the holy place and it is 22 km from Udupi. The brammasthana temple here founded by sri Ramanna bairy. It was an astabanda bramha. The main archaka of this temple is Nagaraj bairy.

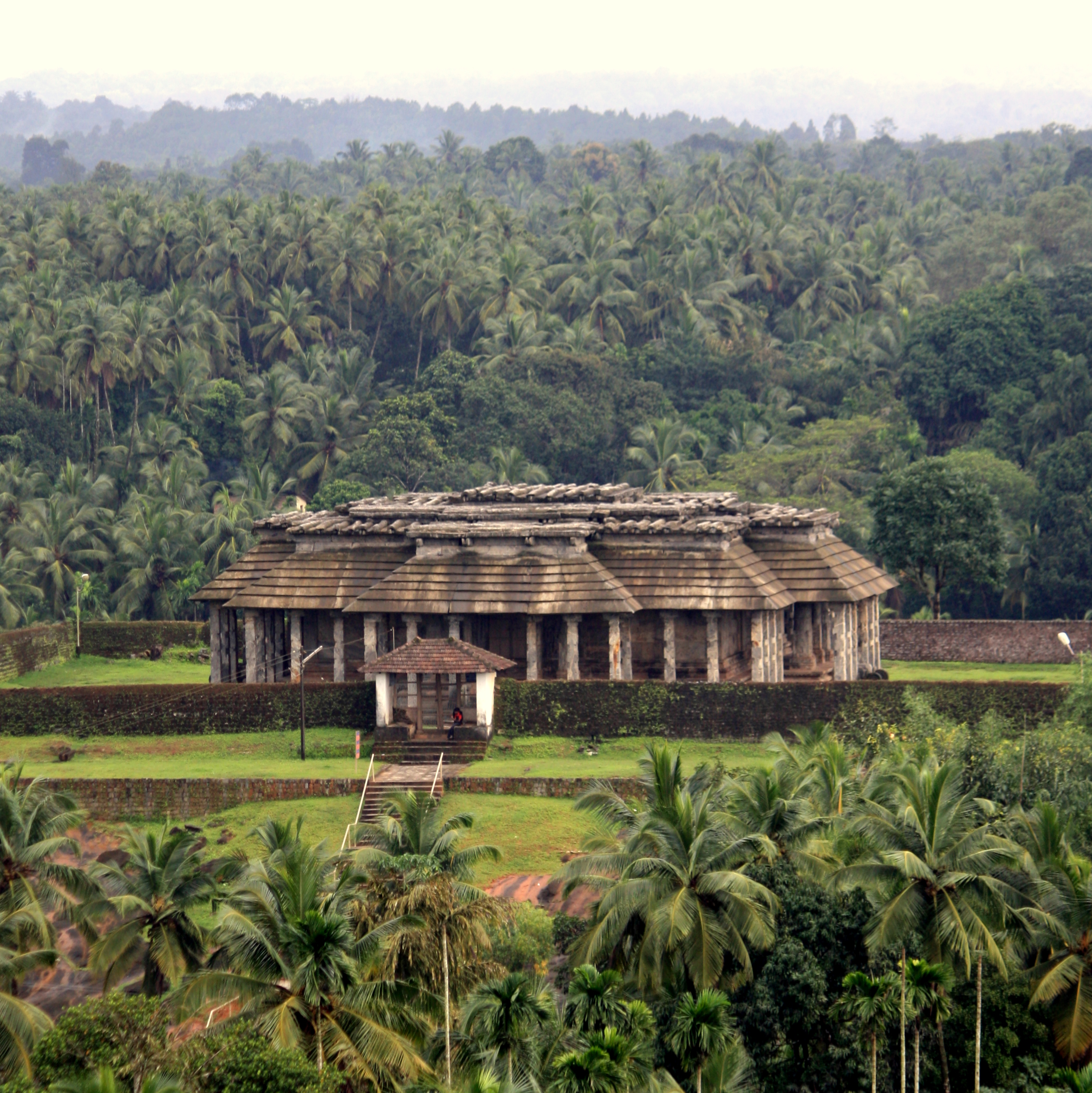
Chaturmukha Basadi, Karkala

- Karkala: 50 km from Mangalore and 20 km from North of Moodabidire, is Karkala, an important centre of Jainism. There are several temples and a 17 metres high statue of Bahubali (Gomateshwara), situated on a small hill. The statue is a naked figure reached by a flight of rock-cut steps. Some of the temples are Chaturmukha Basti (1587), Neminatha Basti, Ananthapadmanabha Temple (1567) dedicated to Vishnu, and Venkataramana temple (Padutirupathi).
- Venur: Situated 50 km NE of Mangalore, has eight Bastis and ruins of a Mahadeva temple. The largest of them is the 17C Kalli Basti, dedicated to Shantinatha. There is a Gommateshwara Monolith, 11metres high dating back to 1604 in Venur.
- Malpe Beach: Situated 66 km north of Mangalore, near Manipal. It has a tourist beach. The uninhibited St. Mary's Island, accessible by boat, has a beach and an impressive geological formation of basalt rock pillars into the sea.
- Dharmastala: Situated 75 km from Mangalore, Dharmastala is an attractive site surrounded by forested hills, rice fields and by the river Netravati on all sides. The Manjunatha temple here is a pilgrim centre. A Monolithic statue of Bahubali 14metres high was erected here in 1973. Visitors are provided with free boarding and lodging by the temple authorities. There is a small museum, Manjusha Museum located opposite to the temple. There are two temple chariots covered in wooden figures and all types of religious objects including carved and painted panels, bronze sculptures and bells.
- Kollur, 147 km from Mangalore: The temple of goddess Mookambika is located here on top of Kodachadri hill, at the foot of the Western Ghats. The goddess takes the form of a 'Jyotirlinga' incorporating aspects of Shiva and Shakti. It is a pilgrimage centre attracting lot of devotees.

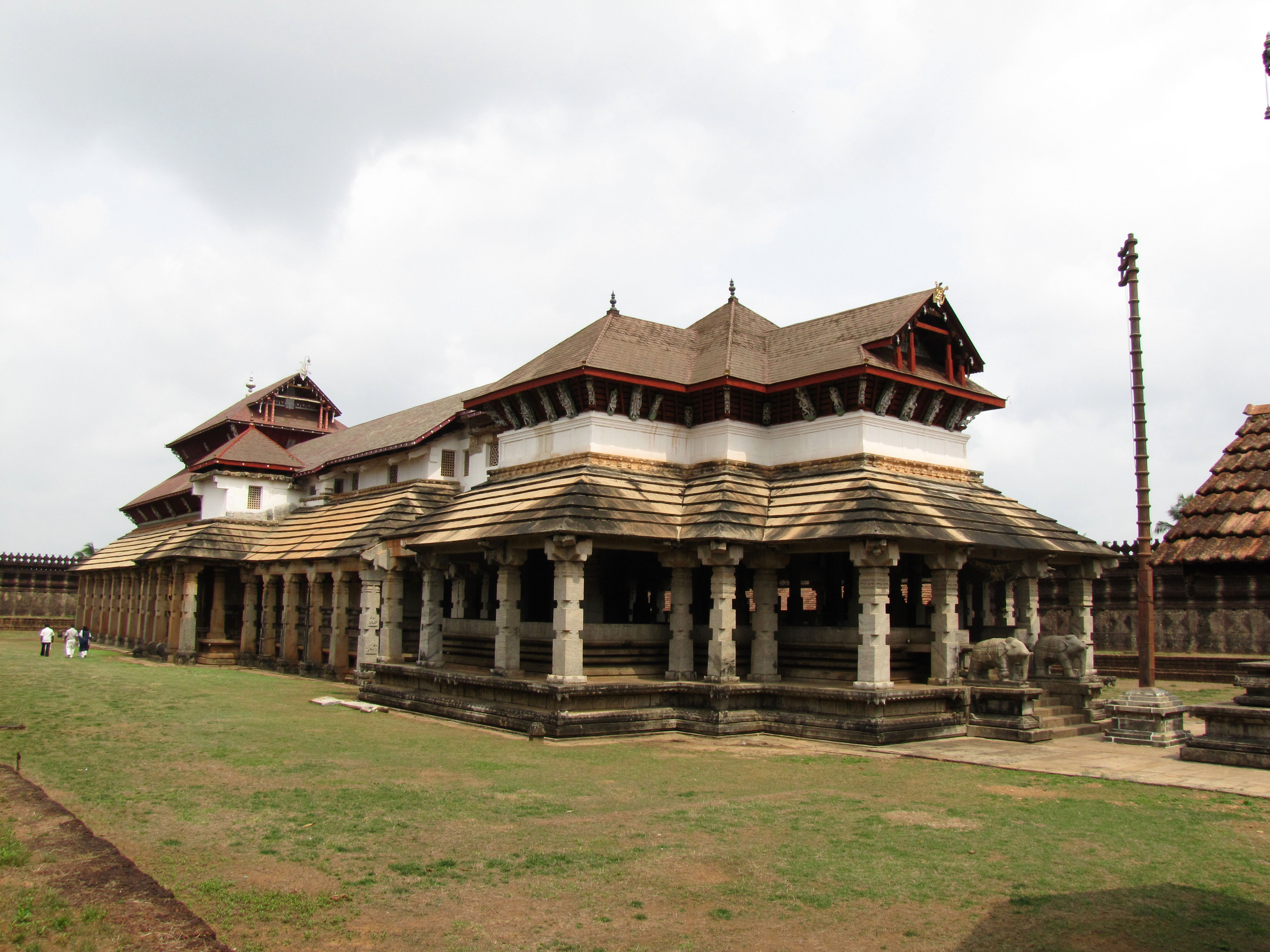
Saavira Kambada Basadi, Moodabidri

- Moodabidre: Situated 35 km from Mangalore, Moodabidire has Jain temples known as Basti's. There are 18 Bastis, the oldest and the largest is the Chandranatha Basti (1429) with its 1000 pillared hall. 'The Jain Matha' near the entrance has an important collection of manuscripts. Other shrines worthy of mention are Shantinatha, Settara, Derama Setti Basti, Guru Basti, Kote and Vikrama Setti Basti.
- Bhatkal: located 135 km from Karwar was the main port of Vijayanagar empire in the 16th century. The ancient town has temples of Vijayanagar style and many Jain monuments. The 17th-century Hindu temple here in Vijayanagar style has animal carvings. 16 km away is the shore temple of Shri Murdeshwar. The temple attracts a lot of devotees and tourists.
- Honnavar: situated 90 km from Karwar, has a Portuguese fort. There is also a fort in Basavaraja Durga Island, amidst the sea which can be reached by a sail upstream on river Sharavathi.
- Ankola: Located 37 km south of Karwar, is a small town with 15th-century ruined walls of King Sarpamalika's fort and the ancient Shri Venketaraman Temple. Near the temple there are two giant wooden chariots carved with scenes from the Ramayana.

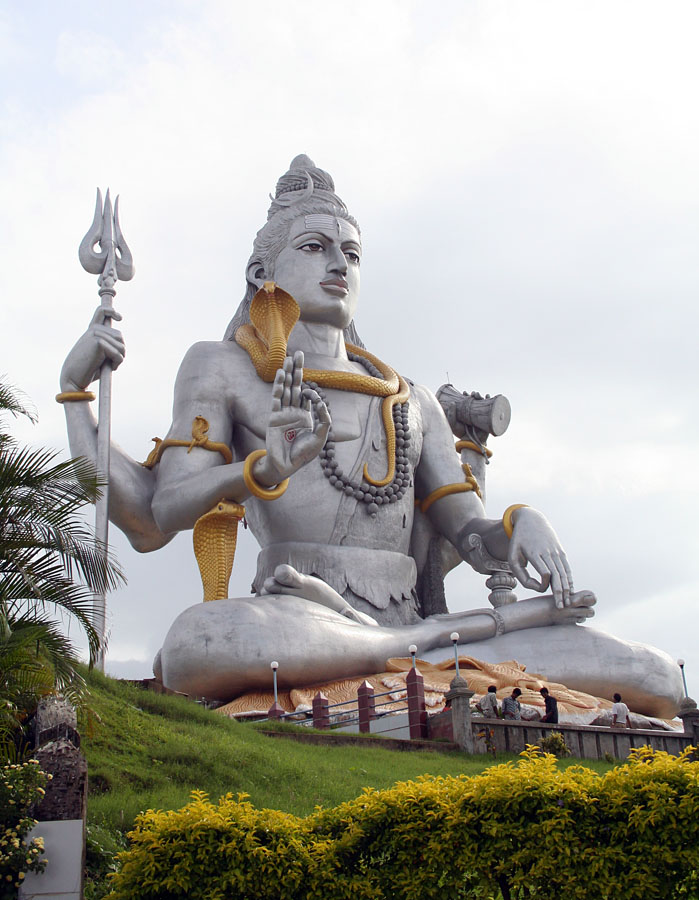
Giant Shiva statue at Murdeshwar

- Murdeshwar: The Murdeshwar Temple in Uttara Kannada District of Karnataka now possesses at 249-feet Raja Gopura. The Murdeswar temple complex is renowned for the tallest idol of Lord Shiva in the world, which is 123 feet. The latest addition to the temple, thanks to Mr. RN Shetty an entrepreneur and philanthropist, is the Rajagopuram, which was opened on 12 April 2008. Its Gopuram is regarded as exceptionally tall.

The Rajagopuram of Murdeswar Temple has 21 floors, including the ground floor. The base measures 105 feet in length and 51 feet breadth. The gopura also possess a lift and visitors can go to the top and have an aerial view of the Arabian Sea and the statue of Lord Shiva. Another highlight is the life-size statues of two elephants at the base of the gopura.

World's tallest Siva idol: The highlights of Murdeshwar lie beyond its beach and rural flair. On a little green hill, a 37 m (or 123 feet) Lord Shiva idol sits enthroned, surrounded by smaller statues illustrating moments of the Hindu mythology

=== Beaches ===
Karwar has a number of beaches like the Blue Lagoon Beach and Ladies Beach. Rabindranath Tagore described his experiences at Karwar beach in his poetry. Om beach, Murdeshwar are other notable beaches of Uttara Kannada Dist. The Nethrani Island near Murdeshwar. Basavaraja Durga near Honavar is an island fort raised by the Keladi Rulers during 16th and 17th centuries. It is surrounded by a strong fortification raised by gigantic laterite blocks and the hill has a flat top. Devagad and Kurmagad are two islands near Karwar.{Nirvana beach} at Kagal village of Kumta is a 5 km long beach in one stretch with white sand and transparent water in the month of December till March. The entire beach coastline is covered by Casuarina and coconut trees.

=== Planetarium ===
- Jawahar Lal Nehru Planetarium: Situated near Cubbon park, Bangalore. It organizes the shows in English and Kannada. Moreover, it has science center for educational activities.
- Swami Vivekananda Planetarium: Situated at Pilikula in Mangalore, it is the 1st 3D Planetarium in India.

== South Karnataka ==
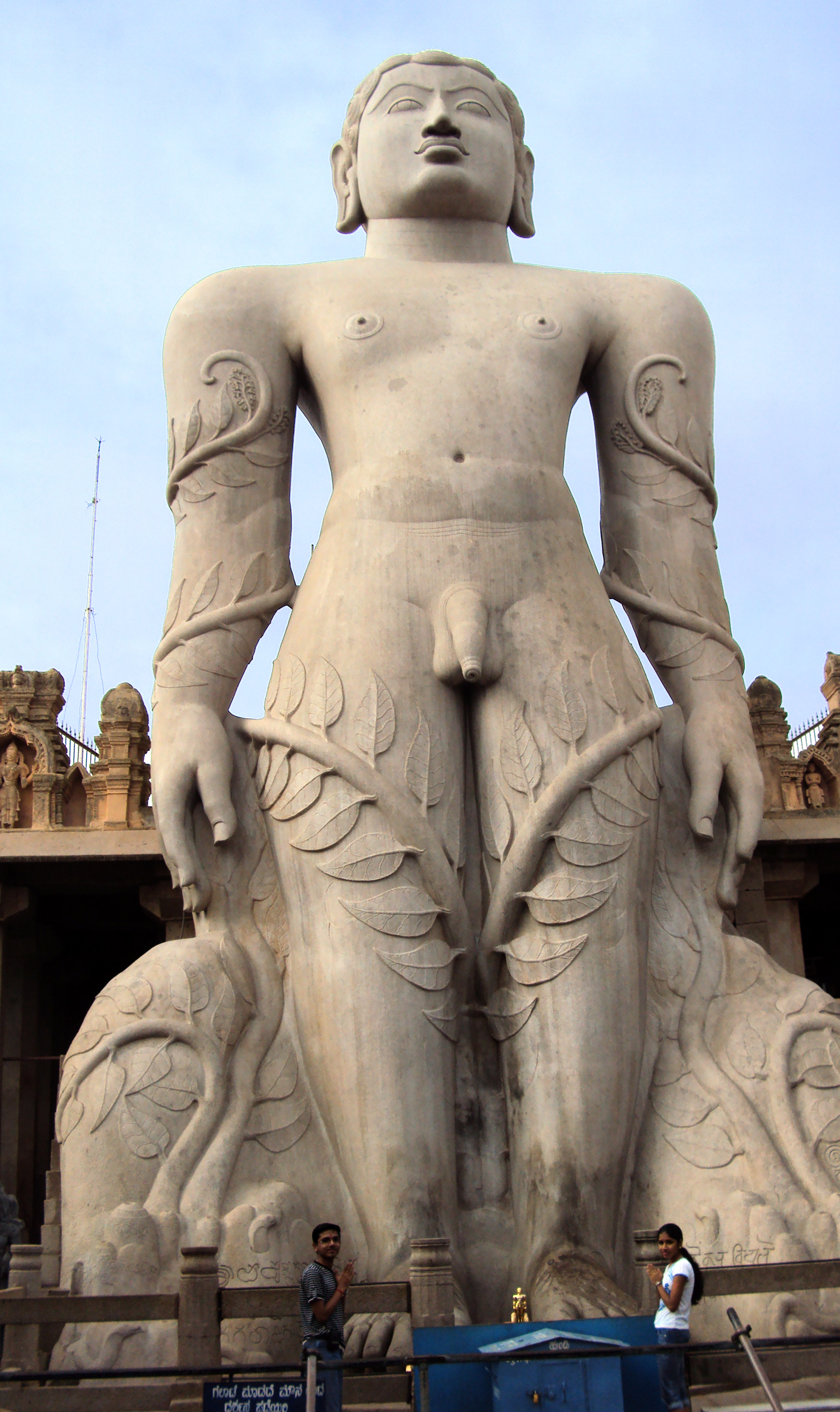
Gommaṭeśvara statue at Shravanabelagola

South Karnataka has a combination of vesara style Hoysala architecture, Jain monuments, colonial buildings and palaces of the Kingdom of Mysore, a fort at Chitradurga and densely forested wildlife sanctuaries that offer eco-tourism. Belur, Halebidu in Hassan District, Somanathapura in Mysore District, Belavadi, Kalasa and Amrithapura in Chikmagalur District, Balligavi in Shimoga District offer examples of Hoysala architecture dating from the 11th to 13th centuries, while Shravanabelagola in Hassan district and Kambadahalli in Mandya District have 10th-century Jain monuments. The region's forests and wildlife are an attraction for tourism. Bandipur National Park, Nagarahole, Biligirirangan Hills, Bhadra Wildlife Sanctuary and Bannerghatta national parks are popular places for jungle safaris.

The river Kaveri flows east from Kodagu District and along its way one finds important tourist destinations like Shivanasamudra and nearby Sivasamudram Falls,

Srirangapattana and Melkote etc. Mysuru, the cultural capital of the state is home to palaces, colonial buildings and cultural activities including Carnatic music, and theatre. Bengaluru the capital is a cosmopolitan city with parks, pubs, restaurants, shopping and fast-paced technology-rich lifestyle.

- Bengaluru: the capital of Karnataka has many tourist attractions.

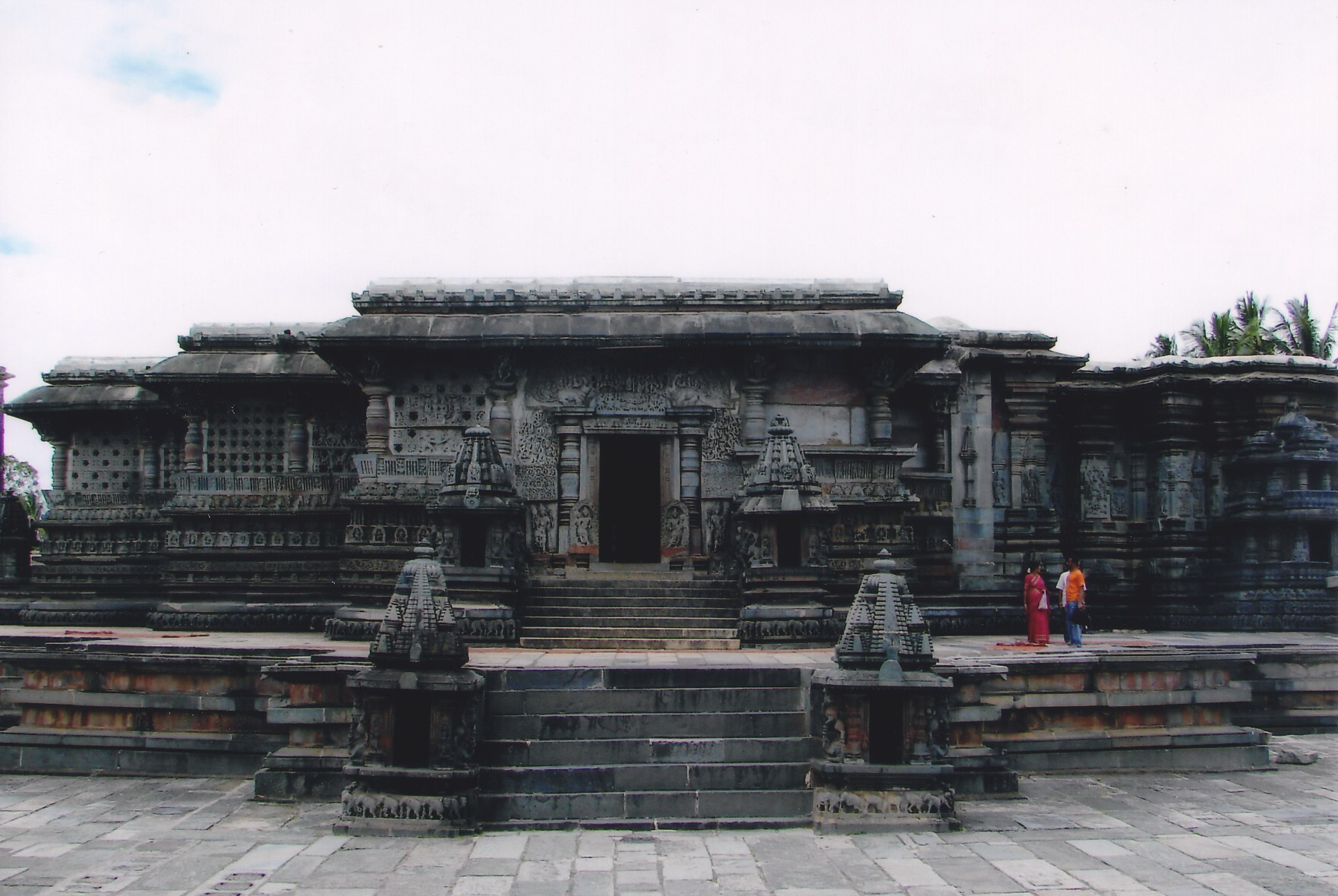
Chennakesava Temple

- Mandya: is a city, Sugar factories contribute majorly to the economy of the city. The Mandir of Shri Shirdi Sai Baba popular amongst local Sai Devotees as Mandyada Shri Shiradi Sai Baba Mandir is situated at B.Gowdagere, Gejjalagere village amidsts picturesque natural surrounding in Mandya District of Karnataka. The Mandir is situated at a distance of about 9.3 kilometers from Maddur town and about 12 kilometers from Mandya Town on Bangalore-Mysore State Highway. All the buses playing on Bangalore-Mysore route stops at B.Gowdagere Sai Baba Mandir Entrance situated on the highway. The temple is situated at a distance of just 1 kilometre from the main road. The Mandir is lovingly addressed by everyone as "Namma Tatathana Mane" (Our Grand Father's Home).
- Belur: Home to the Hoysala temple complex. The Chennakeshava temple here was completed in 1116 by Hoysala Vishnuvardhana. The image is 3.7 m tall and the temple standing on a platform has exquisite plastic art work on its outer walls and bracket figures of dancing girls in various poses in perfect proportion. There are shrines of Kappe Chenniga Andal, Saumya Nayaki etc. The temple here is a classic example of Hoysala art, and Belur was one of the Hoysala Capitals.

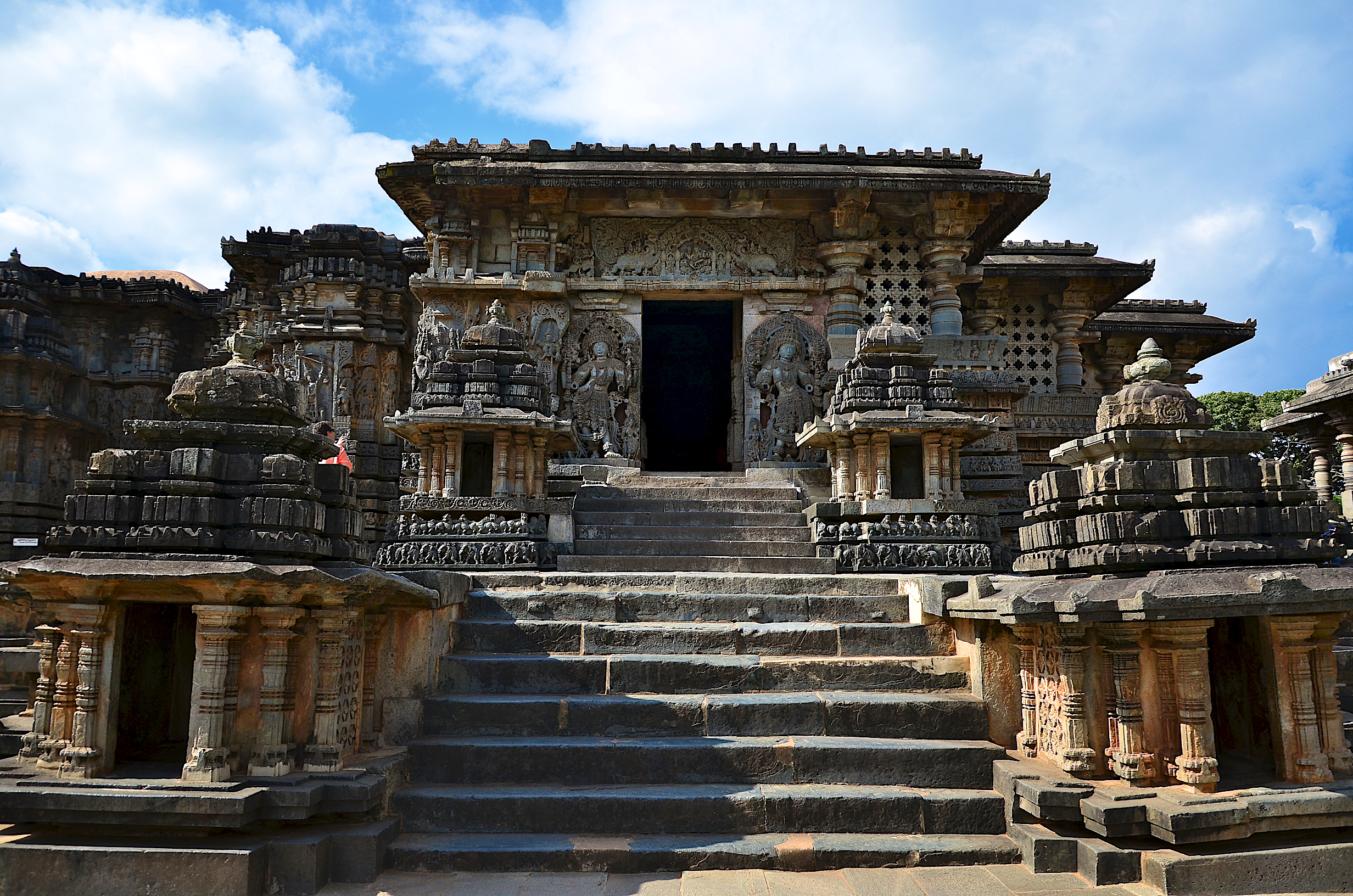
Hoysaleswara Temple, Halebidu

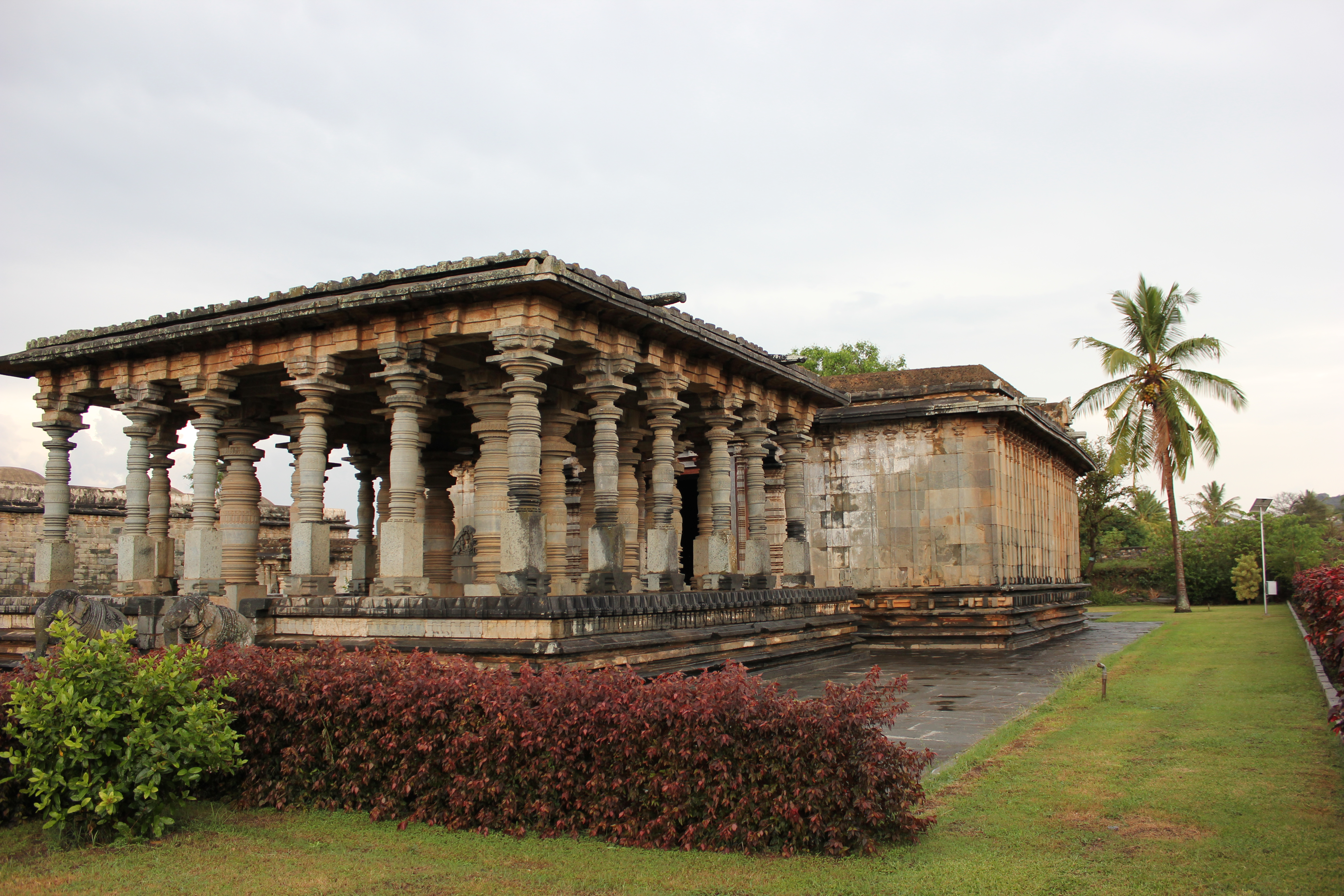
Parshvanatha Basadi, Halebidu, a UNESCO World Heritage Site

- Halebidu: It is 27 km from Hassan, was capital of Hoysala and it was formerly called as Dwarasamudra. It has one of the finest Hoysala temples said to have been started by Ketamalla, a commander of Vishnuvardhana in 1121. The twin Shiva Temples, Hoysaleswara Temple and Kedareshwara Temple with a common platform and two garbhagrihas, one houses for Vishnuvardhana Hoysaleshwara Linga and the other for Shanthaleshwara Linga. In front of Hoysaleshwara is the Nandimantapa and behind that is shrine of Surya with a two-meter-tall image. Outer walls have rows of intricate figures narrating episodes from epics like Ramyana, Mahabartha, and Bhagavata. There are also three Jain basadis equally rich in architecture. The temples are proposed to be listed under UNESCO World Heritage Sites.
- Arasikere: It is 41 km from Hassan and 176 km from Bangalore. It has coconut gardens. There is a Kattameshwara temple here which is also called Chandramoulishwara and referred to as Kalmeshwara in the records. It is a fine Hoysala monument with a rare polygonal frontal Mantapa with special design. There is a fine Haluvokkalu Temple and also a Sahasrakuta Jinalaya. Malekal Tirupathi near Arasikere has a venkataramana temple visited by many devotees.
- Aralaguppe: There is a Kalleshwara temple in the Ganga-Nalamba style of the 9th century. Its ceiling has a dancing Shiva sculpture with musical accompanists and eight Dikpalas surrounding him with all their paraphernalia. There is a Chennakeshava temple of the Hoysala style. An image of Vishnu lies in the garbhagriha. There are four Ganga temples.
- Madhugiri: It is 43 km from Tumkur and has a large hill fort. The ancient name of the place is Maddagiri. It has the temples of Venkataramana and Malleshwara built by Vijayanagara feudatories. There is also a Mallinatha basadi. The fort has gateways called Antaralada Bagilu, Diddibagilu, Mysore Gate etc. 19 km from here is another hill fort called Midigeshi.
- Madikeri or Mercara: Known as Scotland of India, Mercara known for its climate. It has many places of attraction such as Tala Cauvery, Nagarahole National Park, Abbe Water Falls, St. Mark's Church, Bagamandala, Cauvery Nisargadhama, Belegiri Hills, Thadiyanda Murali Kund, Igguthappa Temple, Irupu Falls And Coffee & Tea Estates.

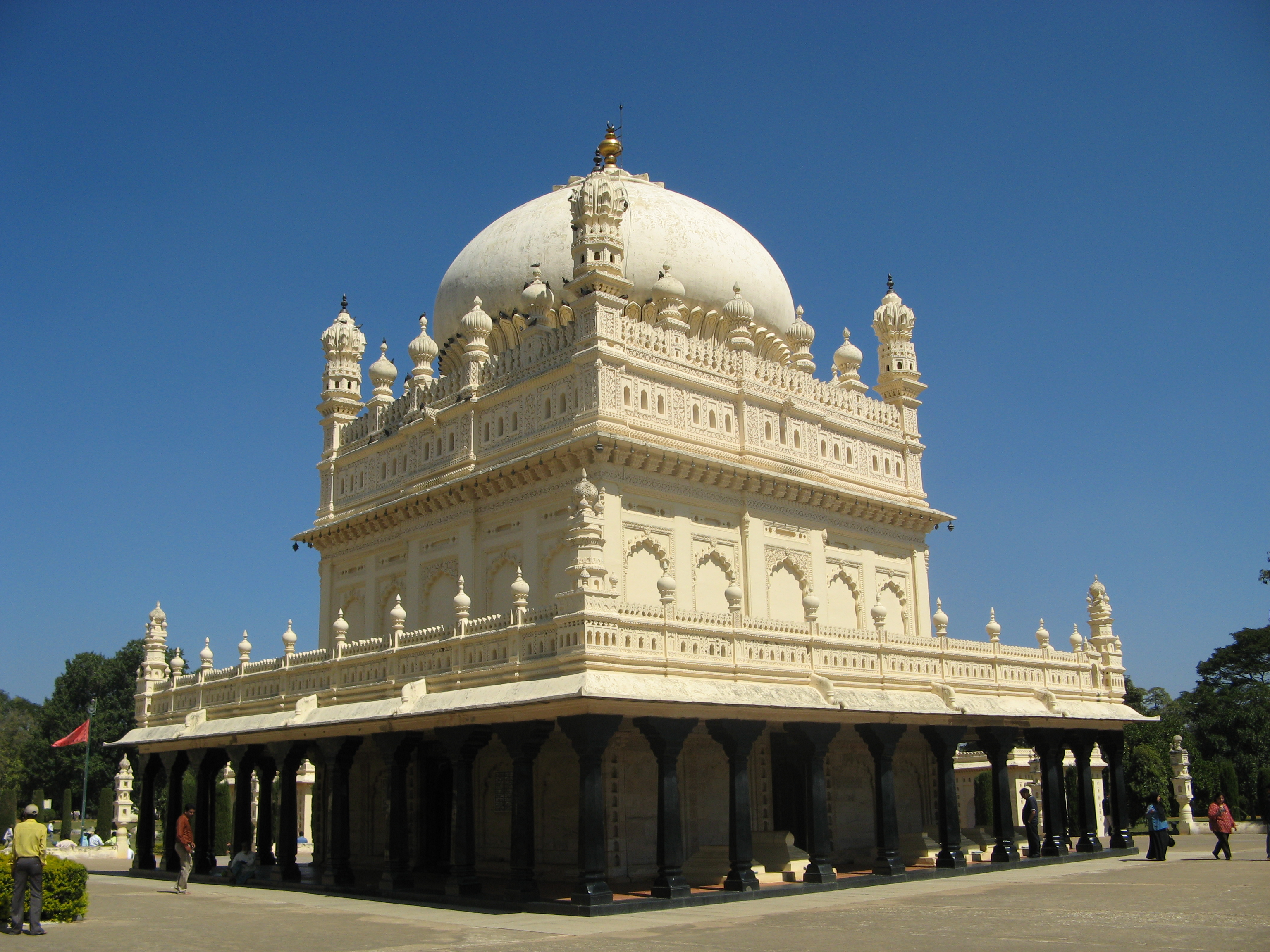
Gumbaz, Srirangapatna

- Srirangapattana: It is 14 km from Mysore & it is an island in between two branches of the Cauvery. It was also the capital of the Mysore rulers. There is a Ranganath temple here. The fort here was built in 1454. The Mysore rules made it their capital in 1610 in the days of Raja Wodeyar, who took it from the Vijayanagara Governor. The Ranganatha temple is called Adi Ranga. Ganjam has Dariya Daulat palace of Tipu and Gumbaz, the mausoleum of Haider and Tipu. Both are impressive structures of Indo-Saracenic style. The palace has paintings, fine woodwork and it houses a museum.
- Melukote: It is a religious centre which attracts lakhs of people during its annual feast Vairamudi. The temple was reconstructed in the Hoysala style by Visnuvardhana with the guidance of Ramanujacharya, a Visistadvaitist, in the 11th century. There are Cheluvanarayanaswamy temple, Kalyani, Hill shrine of Lord Narasimha, Thottilamadu, Dhanuskoti, Academy of Sanskrit Research and many more to visit. The nearest tourist places are Thondanur, Srirangapatna, Karigatta, Nagamangala etc.,
- Mahadeshwara Betta: It is 220 km from Bangalore and 142 km from Mysore. It is very close to eastern Ghats. It is said that a saint called Mahadeshwara, who could ride a tiger, lived and had his gadduge here during the 14th and 15th centuries. The hill is full of thick forests and thousands of pilgrims visit the place.
- Talakadu: A Holy place on the banks of the Cauvery. It is full of sands, carried by the wind from the dried bed of the river. It was the second capital of the Gangas. They built the Pataleshwara and the Maruleshwara templeshere. Hoysala Vishnuvardhana built Kirti Narayana temple.

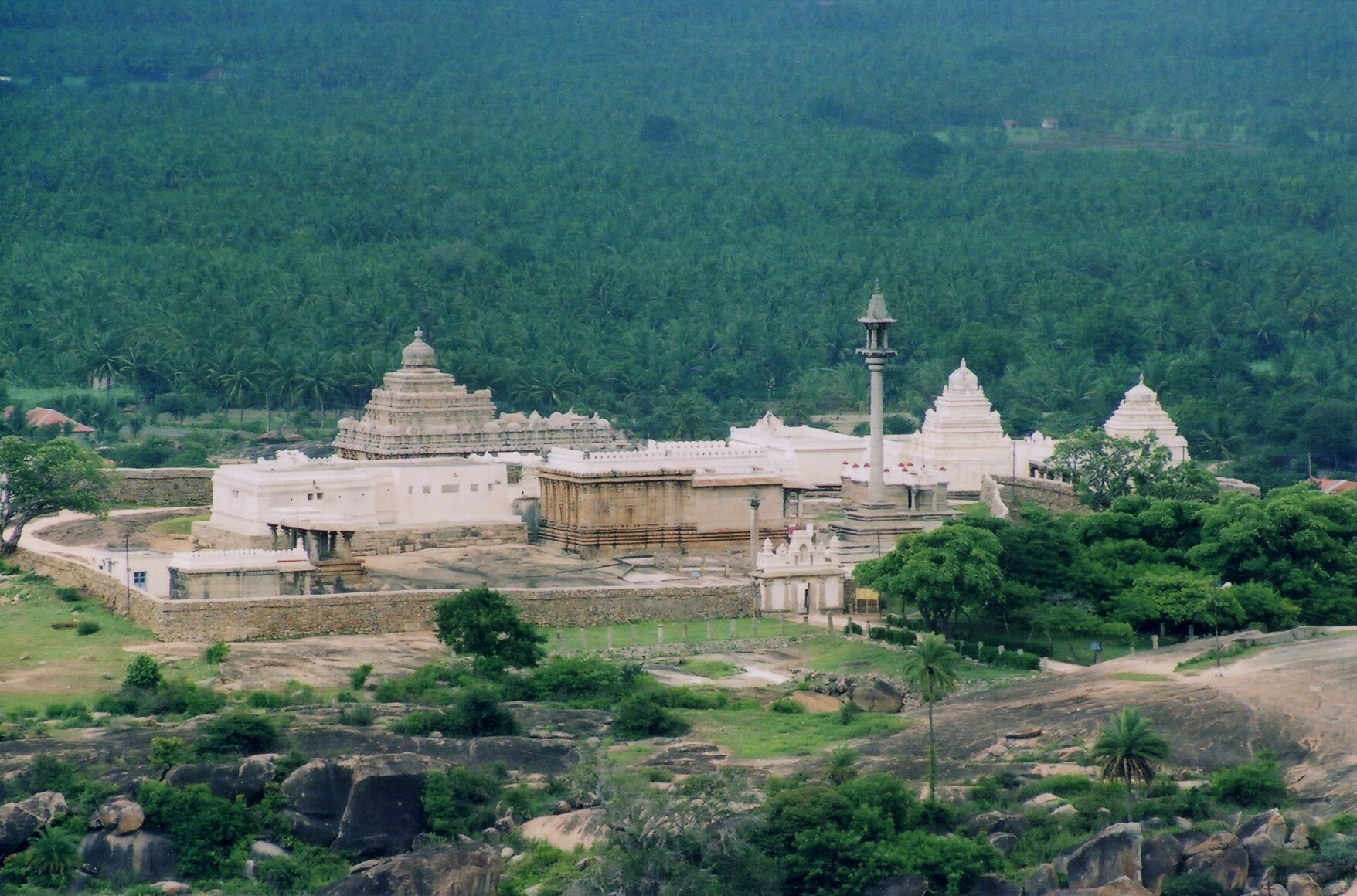
Temple complex on Chandragiri hill, Shravanabelagola

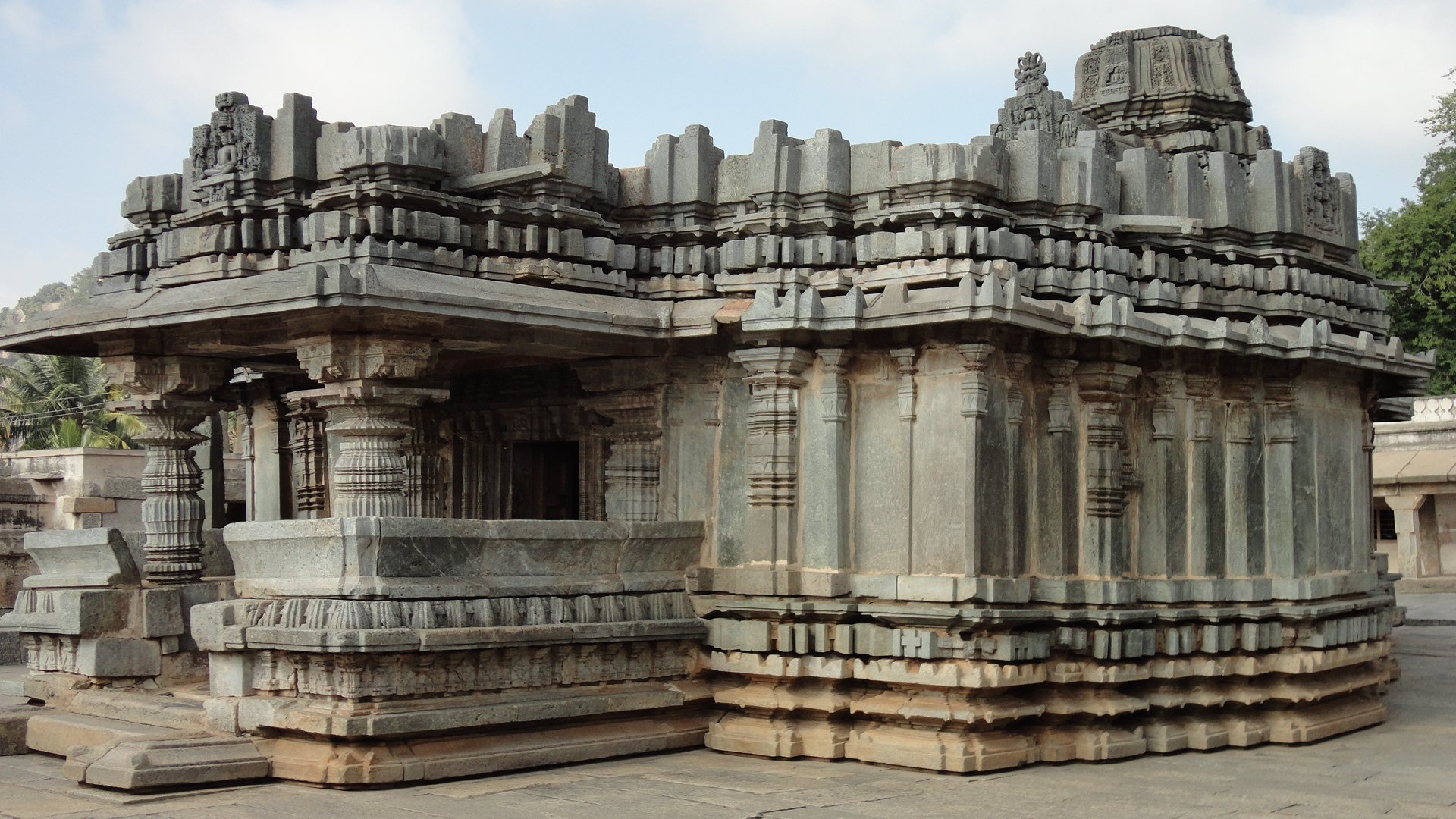
Akkana Basadi

- Bhadravathi: It is an industrial town in Shimoga district 256 km away from Bangalore, which was earlier known as "Benkipura". There is a 13th-century Lakshminarayan Temple in Hoysala style. An iron and steel works, a cement factory and a paper factory are located on the banks of Bhadra river.
- Ikkeri: It was a capital town of the Keladi Nayakas from 1512, and a place is 2 km from Sagara City. The Aghoreshwara temple is a 16th-century monument of great attraction. There is also a Paravathi temple nearby. Keladi is another place nearby, the original capital. It has the Rameshwara and Veerabhadra temples. There is also a museum.
- Sravanabelgola: It has a statue of Lord Bahubali. The place is an important Jain pilgrimage center and has a long history. The 17 meter high statue of Bahubali is said to be the tallest monolithic structure in the world. It overlooks the small town of Shravanbelgola from the top of the rocky hill known as Indragiri. One can reach this hill after ascending 614 rock-cut steps.
- Somanathapura: It is the home to one of the best examples of Hoysala temple architecture, the Kesava Temple.

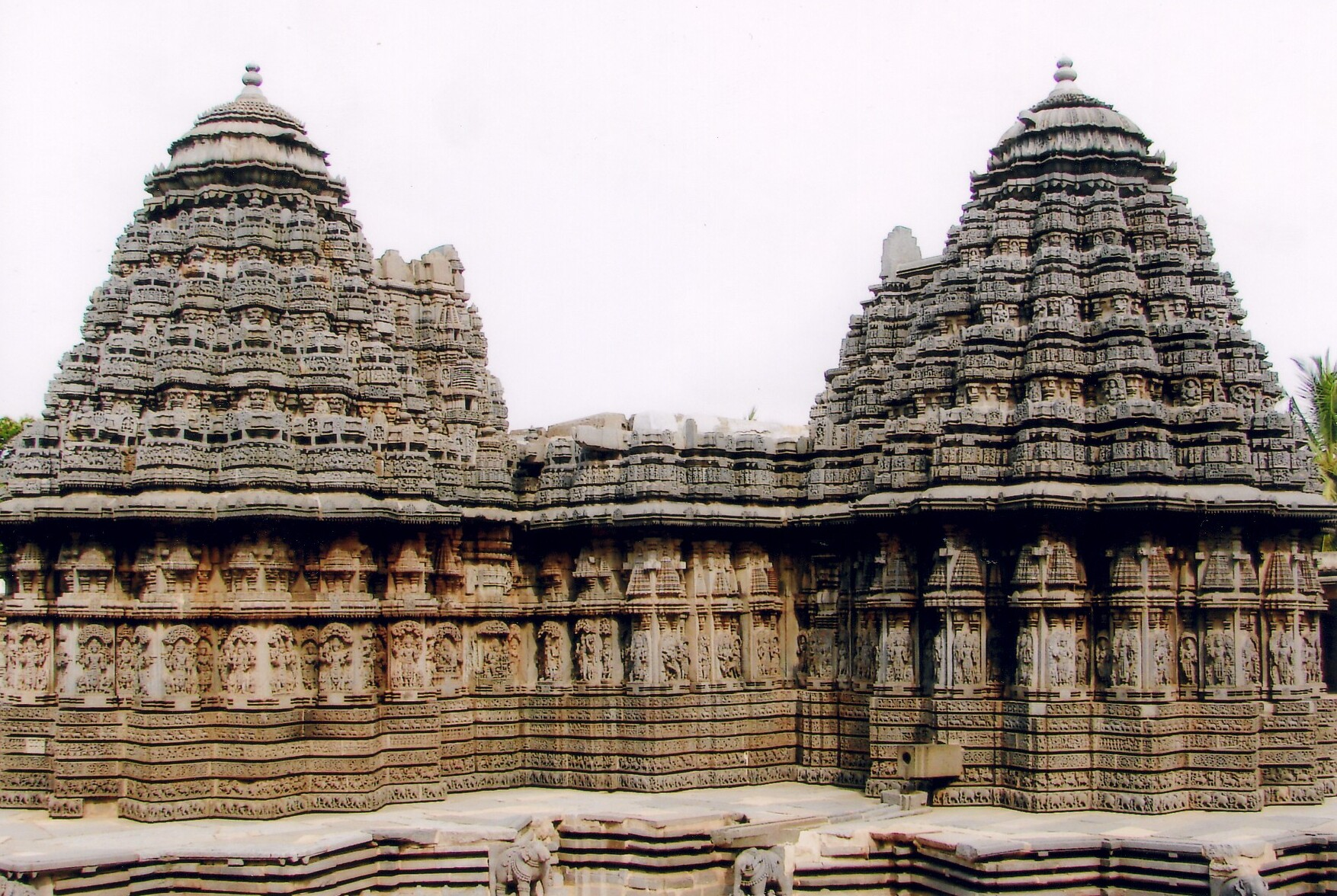
Chennakesava Temple (Rear view), Somanathapura

- Jog Falls: the highest waterfalls in India, is located about 30 km from Sagara City, Karnataka. The Sharavati river drops 253 metres in 4 separate falls known as Rani-the Rocket and Raja-the Roarer. The highest is the Raja with the fall of 253 metres and a pool below 40metres deep. The best time to visit is Late November to early January. The 50 km long Hirebhasgar Reservoir and the Linganamkki dam regulates the flow of the Sharavati river to generate the hydro electricity.
- Mekedatu: It is a picnic spot by the river Cauvery. It tumbles down through a deep ravine, on top of which is a chasm around 5 meters wide. Mekedatu is on Kanakapura Road.
- Hesaraghatta: Hesaraghatta has an artificial lake, a dairy and a horticulture farm. Boating and windsurfing are the other attractions. Also here is the Nrityagrama where young dancers are trained in all disciplines of traditional dance.
- Shivagange: A hill with four faces, rising to a height of 4599 ft looks like a Nandi from the East, Ganesh from the West, A Linga from the South and Cobra with it hood spread from the North side. It is accessible by road.
- Shivanasamudram: The waterfalls, the Ganganchukki and the Bharachukki, cascade down 90 meters. These falls are the source of Asia's first Hydro Electric Power Station called "Shimsa". The falls are in full splendour during July–August. The falls are 122 km from Bangalore.
- Hogenakkal Falls: These are also known as the 'smoking rocks' because of the mist. At the bottom of the 90 ft water falls, one can ride in a coracle.
- Devarayanadurga: This is a hill station of Tumkur road perched at a height of 3940 feet. A few kilometres from foot of the hills is a natural spring called Namada Chilume.

== Palaces ==
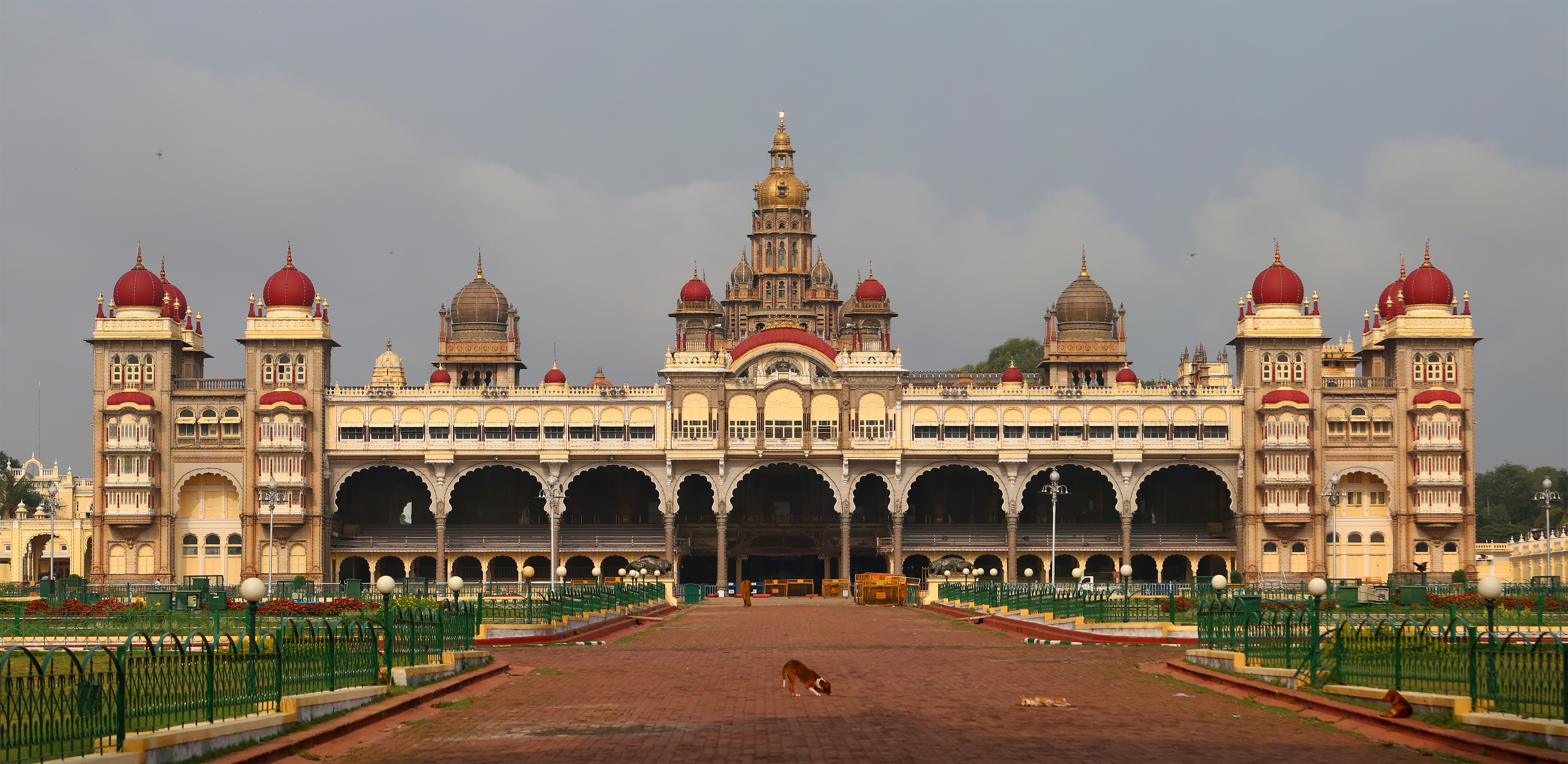
Mysore Palace

- Bangalore Palace
- Mysore Palace, Also known as Ambavilas Palace
- Nalknad Palace
- Rajendra Vilas
- Jaganmohan Palace
- Jayalakshmi Vilas Mansion
- Lalitha Mahal
- Cheluvamba Mansion, Mysore
- Shivappa Nayaka Palace
- Daria Daulat Bagh

== Forts ==
In Karnataka there are thousands of Forts, in Kannada called as Kote or Gad or Durga.

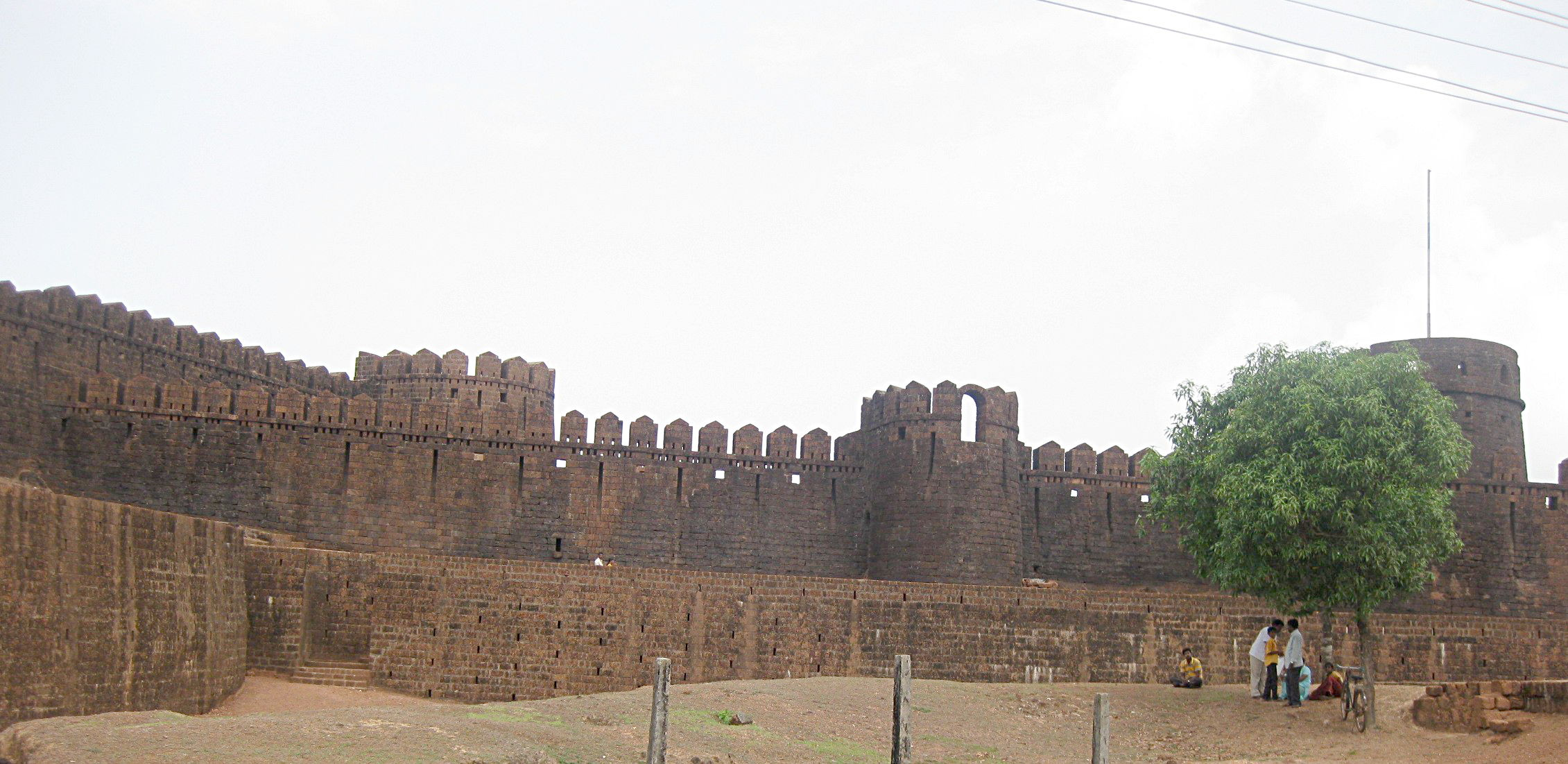
Mirjan Fort in Uttara Kannada District in North Karnataka

Forts of Karnataka.

The Forts in Karnataka are belongs to various dynasties, some of them are more than thousand years old.

- Malliabad Fort
- Jaladurga
- Bahaddur Bandi Fort
- Kyadigera Fort
- Bidar Fort
- Basavakalyana Fort
- Bhalki Fort
- Manyakheta Fort
- Kittur Fort
- Parasgad Fort
- Belgaum Fort
- Saundatti Fort
- Ramdurg Fort
- Bailhongal Fort
- Hooli Fort
- Gokak Fort
- Shirasangi Fort
- Bijapur Fort
- Gajendrgad Fort
- Korlahalli Fort
- Hammigi Fort
- Hemagudda Fort
- Mundargi Fort
- Singatalur Fort
- Tippapura Fort
- Nargund Fort
- Magadi Fort
- Jamalabad Fort
- Barkur Fort
- Daria-Bahadurgad Fort
- Kapu Fort
- Havanur Fort
- Mirjan Fort
- Sadashivgad Fort
- Asnoti
- Sanduru Fort
- Bellary Fort
- Adoni Fort
- Koppal Fort
- Anegundi Fort
- Kampli Fort
- Irakalgada
- Kalaburagi Fort
- Sedam Fort
- Shahpur Fort
- Madhugiri
- Aihole Fort
- Badami Fort
- Bankapura Fort
- Savanur Fort
- Chitradurga Fort
- Devanahalli Fort
- Vanadurga Fort
- Channagiri Fort
- Kavaledurga Fort
- Basavaraj durga fort
- Uchangidurga Fort
- Budikote|
- Fort Anjediva
- Gudibanda
- Wagingera Fort
- Bangalore Fort
- Bhimgad Fort
- Kammatadurga
- Pavagada
- Madikeri Fort
- Savandurga
- Makalidurga|
- Vanadurga
- Sanmudageri
- Vishalgad
- Nagara Fort
- Basavaraja Fort
- Rayadurg
- Huthridurga
- Ambajidurga|
- Manjarabad Fort
- Skandagiri
- Hosadurga
- Nagara Fort
- Sathyamangalam Fort
- Tekkalakote Fort
- Thirthahalli Fort
- Raichur Fort

== Botanical and Rock gardens ==
- Lalbagh
- Brindavan Gardens
- Cubbon Park
- The Botanical Garden, University of Agricultural Sciences
- Karnataka University Botany Garden, Karnataka University
- Pampavana Garden, Munirabad
- University of Mysore Botanic Garden, University of Mysore
- Curzon Park, Mysore
- Nishat Baugh, Mysore
- Forest Research Centre Botanic Garden
- Utsav Rock Garden, Shiggaon: Sculptural Garden located near NH-4 Pune-Bangalore road, Gotagodi Village, Shiggaon Taluk, Haveri District, Karnataka. Utsav Rock Garden is a sculptural garden representing contemporary art and rural culture. A typical village is created where men and women are involved in their daily household activities.A unique picnic spot which delights common people, educated and intellectuals. There are more than 1000 sculptures in the garden of different sizes. It is an anthropological museum. It represents traditional farming, crafts, folklore, cattle herding and sheep rearing.

== Hill stations ==
The Hill stations in Karnataka are generally unexplored and more pristine than better known ones in South India.

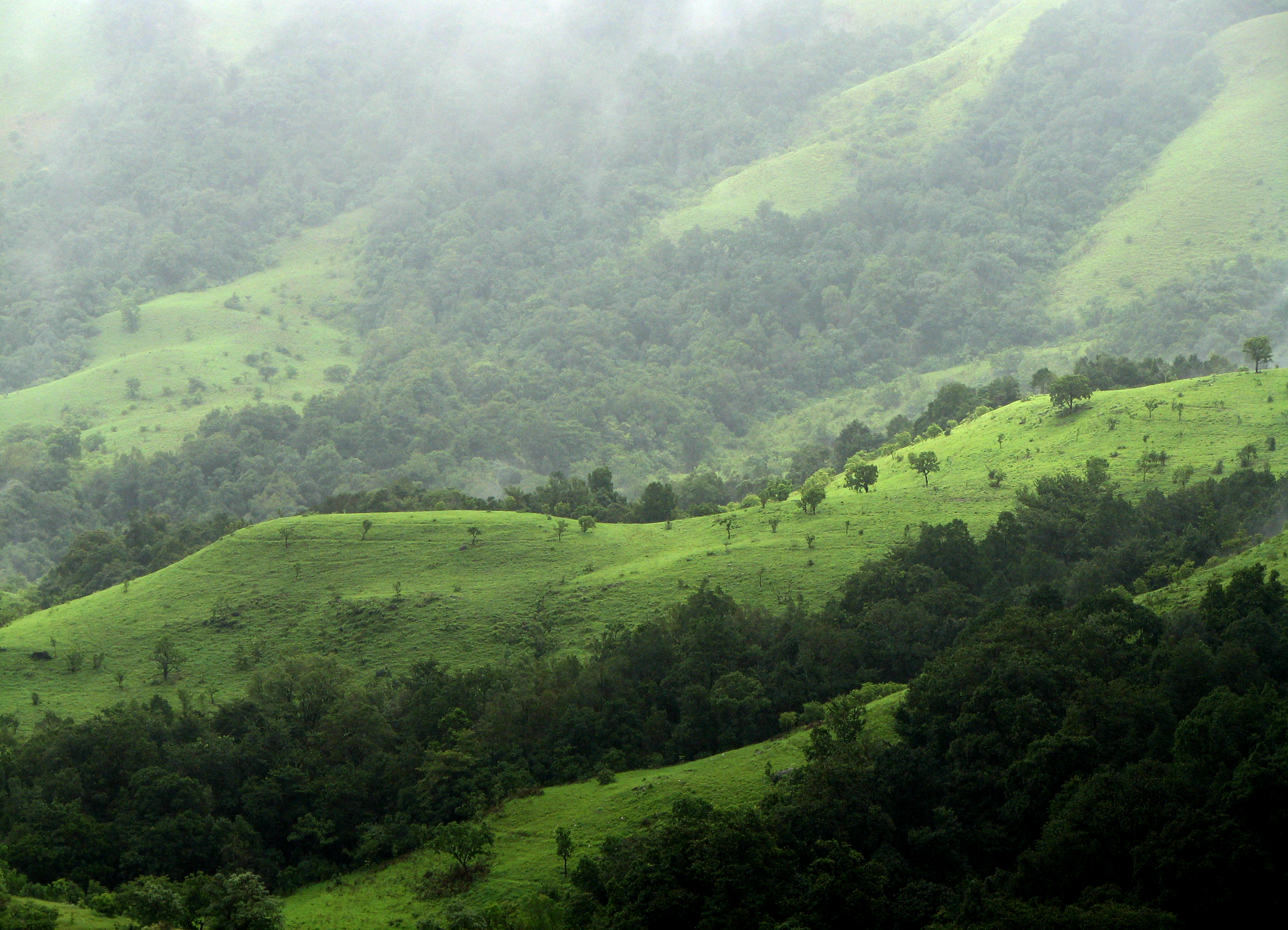
Shola Grasslands in Kudremukh, Karnataka.

- Agumbe, Shimoga District
- Kodachadri, Shimoga District
- Biligiriranga Hills, Chamarajanagar District
- Baba Budangiri, Chikkamagaluru District
- Kemmangundi, Chikkamagaluru District
- Kudremukh, Chikkamagaluru District
- Mullayanagiri
- Pushpagiri(or Kumara Parvatha)
- Nandi Hills, Chikkaballapur district
- Kundadri
- Tadiandamol
- Talakaveri
- Male Mahadeshwara Hills
- Himavad Gopalaswamy Betta
- Ambaragudda
- Antara Gange
- Savandurga
- Kurinja
- Yedakumeri
- Siddara Betta
- Bananthimari Betta
- Skandagiri
- Devarayanadurga
- Madhugiri hill station

Mullaiyanagiri highest peak

== National parks and wildlife ==
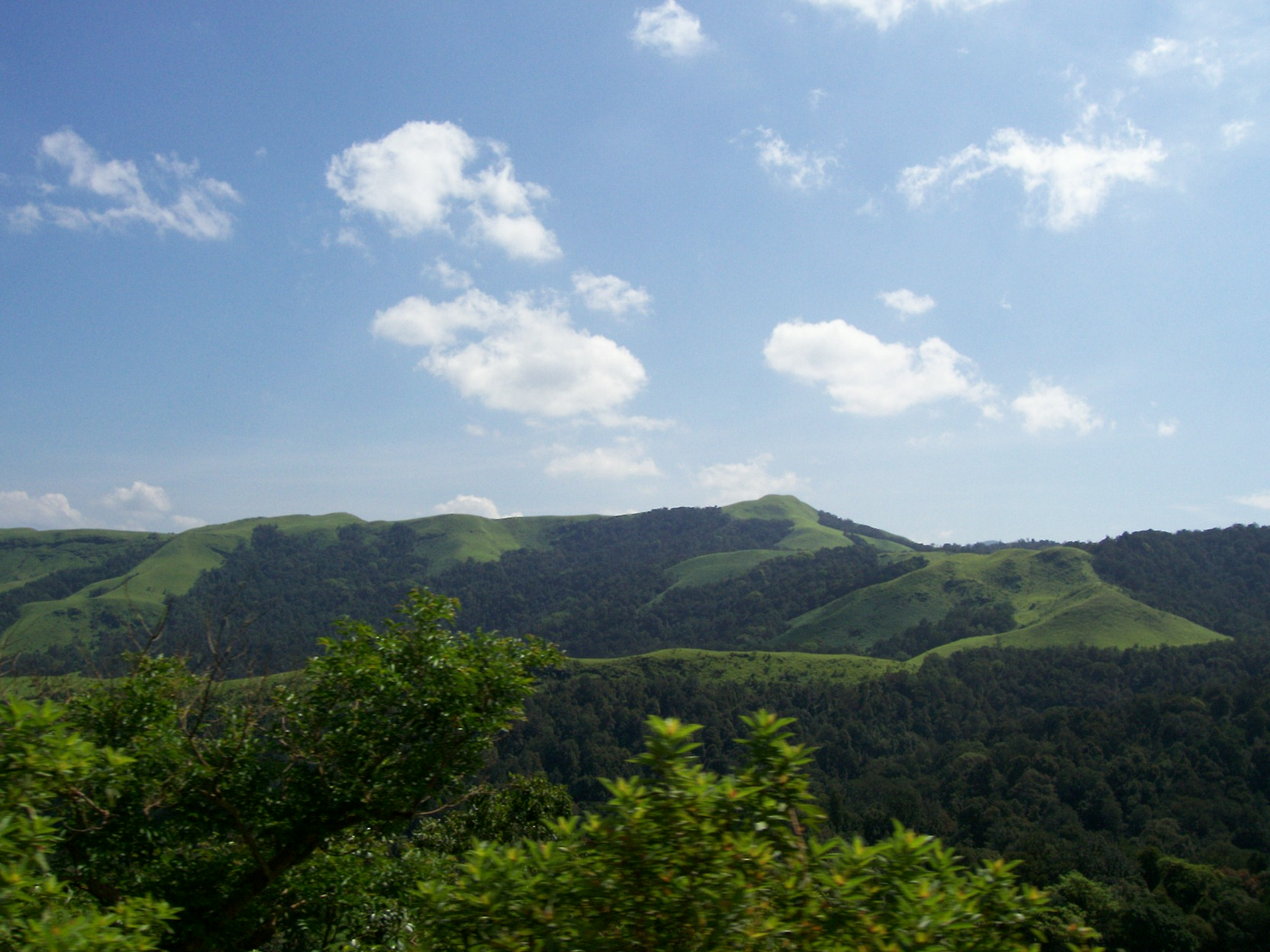
Kudremukh National Park

Karnataka in all has 21 wildlife sanctuaries and 5 National parks. Well known among them are Bandipur National Park in chamarajanagara District, Bannerghatta National Park in Bangalore district, Nagarhole National Park in Mysore District and Kodagu district, Kudremukh National Park in Dakshina Kannada and Chickmagalur district, Dandeli & Anshi National Park in Uttara Kannada district, Gudavi and Mandegadde bird sanctuaries and Sharavati WLS in Sagara Taluk, Shimoga District, Biligirirangan Hills WLS in Chamarajanagar district, Ranganathittu Bird Sanctuary in Mandya district, Brahmagiri wildlife sanctuary and Pushpagiri Wildlife Sanctuary in Kodagu district. Interior dry areas have their own unique wildlife.

There are twenty-one wildlife sanctuaries and five national parks in all.

Recently, the government of India has proposed to the UNESCO to include important ecosystems in the Western Ghats as a World Heritage Site. Two subclusters of natural areas occurring in the list are entirely in the Karnataka region covering several wildlife sanctuaries and some reserve forests. Fragile and exotic ecosystems like Kudremukh NP, Brahmagiri WLS, Pushpagiri WLS, Agumbe, Talakaveri WLS, Someshvara WLS figure in this list. As such, the Western Ghats that run south–north through the Karnataka is considered as one among the twenty-five bio-diversity hotspots of the world.

The Niligiri Biosphere Reserve (also a designated UNESCO Biosphere reserve) is located at the junction of Karnataka, Tamil Nadu and Kerala. Nagarahole National Park WLS and Bandipur National Park and Nugu WLS in Karnataka are included in this biosphere reserve.

The state is home to the largest concentration of Asian Elephants along Kabini River in Nagarahole and Bandipur parks. These two parks also hold among the most viable population of the highly endangered Indian Tiger. RanebennurBlackbuck sanctuary in Ranebennur city is home to one of the largest populations of blackbucks are stayed here and not anywhere in India. The Doraji wildlife sanctuary and areas in Karnataka like Bellary district, Chitradurga are strongholds of the sloth bear.

Karnataka is home to more than 500 species of birds.

=== Wildlife sanctuaries ===
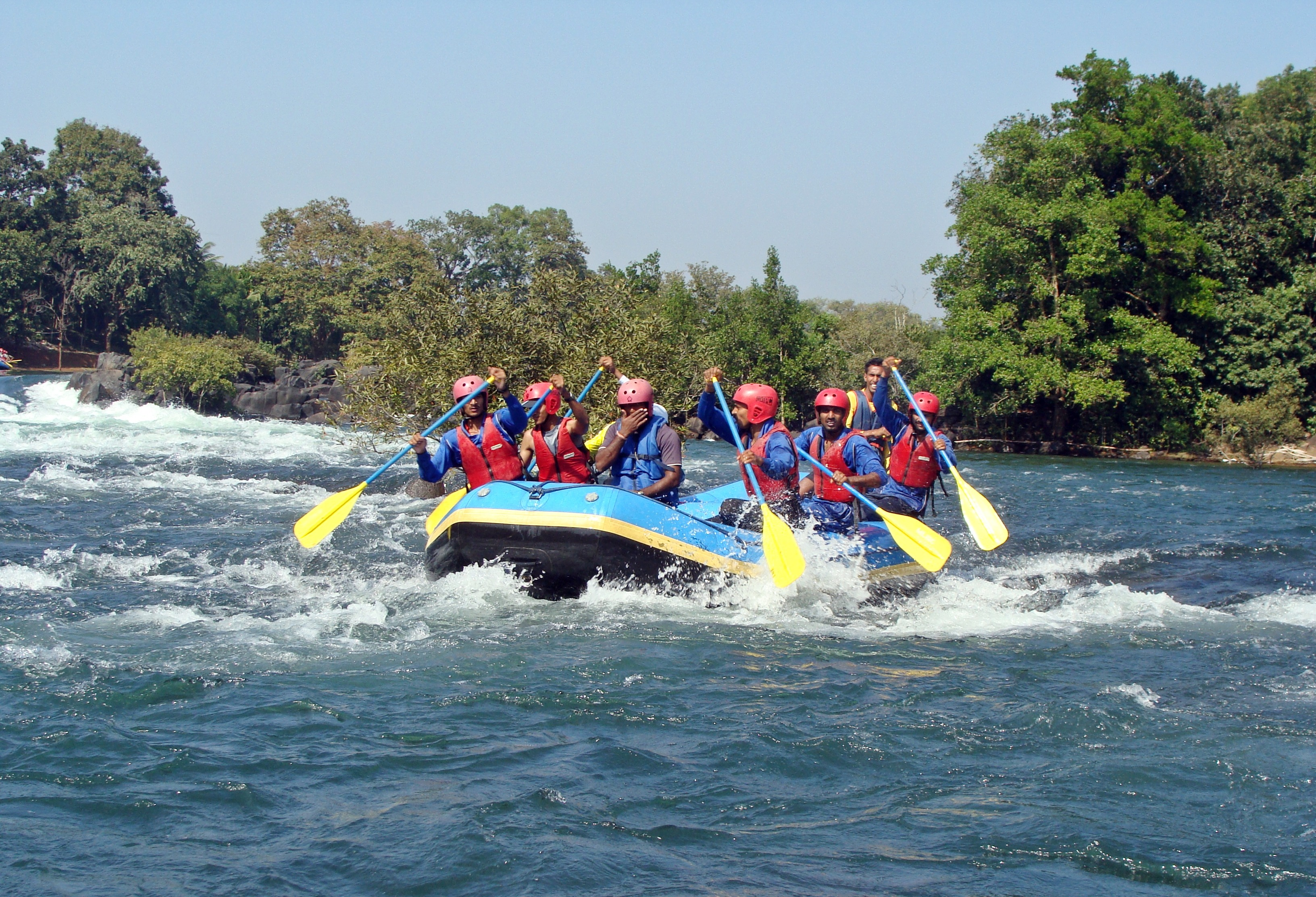
White water rafting near Dandeli

- Dandeli Wildlife Sanctuary, near to Hubli-Dharwad (70 km), Uttara Kannada: spread over 834.16 km^{2}, it is the second largest wildlife sanctuary in Karnataka and is contiguous with the Mahaveer sanctuary in Goa.
- Ghataprabha Bird Sanctuary: small bird sanctuary incorporating the wetland along the river. It was established in 1974 and encompasses an area of 29 km^{2}.
- Daroji Bear Sanctuary, 15 kilometers from Hampi.
- Peacock sanctuary in Bankapura, Shiggon taluk: Bankpur Fort is the second sanctuary in India exclusively engaged in the conservation and breeding of peacocks. It is also home to a variety of other birds.
- Ranebennur blackbuck sanctuary, Haveri district: declared a wildlife sanctuary on 17 June 1974, with a core area of 14.87 km and a buffer zone of 104.13 km for tourists. It is divided into three blocks namely Hulathi, Hunasikatti and Alageri for administrative purposes. The vegetation comprises mainly scrub forests and eucalyptus plantations. Other resident fauna include wild pigs, foxes, jackals and wolves.
- Deva Raya Wildlife Sanctuary, near Hampi, Bellary District: A privately owned sanctuary, named after kings of the Vijayanagar Empire.
- Attiveri Bird Sanctuary, near to Hubli-Dharwad, Uttara Kannada district: spread over an area of about 2.23 km^{2}, the sanctuary is located in and around the Attiveri reservoir.
- Anshi National Park, Uttara Kannada: A habitat for tigers, leopards and elephants, about 340 square kilometres in size. Adjoins the Dandeli wildlife sanctuary.
- Magadi Bird Sanctuary, Shirahatti Taluk, Gadag District
- Bhimagada Sanctuary, Belgaum District
- Adichunchanagiri Wildlife Sanctuary:
- Arabithittu Wildlife Sanctuary:
- Biligiriranga Swamy Temple Wildlife Sanctuary:
- Bhadra Wildlife Sanctuary:
- Brahmagiri Wildlife Sanctuary:
- Cauvery Wildlife Sanctuary:
- Melukote Temple Wildlife Sanctuary: This is located in Mandya district
- Mookambika Wildlife Sanctuary
- Nugu Wildlife Sanctuary
- Pushpagiri Wildlife Sanctuary
- Sharavathi Valley Wildlife Sanctuary in Sagara Taluk
- Shettihalli Wildlife Sanctuary:
- Someshwara Wildlife Sanctuary: This is located in Udupi district
- Talakaveri Wildlife Sanctuary: This is located in Kodagu district
- Gudavi Bird Sanctuary: This is located in Shimoga district and is spread over 0.73 km^{2}. The tree species that dominate this sanctuary are Vitex leucoxylon and Phyllanthus polyphyllus. 191 species of birds are recorded here including white ibis, pheasant-tailed jacana, purple moorhen and little grebe.
- Mandagadde Bird Sanctuary
- Kaggaladu Heronry: This is located in Tumkur district and is one of the largest painted storks sanctuary in South India. Some of the birds that nest here are painted storks, grey herons, pelicans, black stilts and ducks.
- Kokkare Bellur
- Bankapura Peacock Sanctuary: This is located in Haveri district and spread over an area of 139.10 acres (0.5629 km^{2}). This sanctuary was created mainly for the conservation of peacocks.
- Bonal Bird Sanctuary : This is located about 10 km from Shorapur city in Yadgir district.

=== Dams and resorvoir in Karnataka ===
- Almatti Dam across Krishna River
- Basava Sagara Dam, Lingsugur
- Bennethora Reservoir, near Harsur, Gulbarga district
- Bhadra Dam across Bhadra River
- Chakra Dam on the Chakra river
- Chikahole Dam, Chamarajnagar
- Daroji Reservoir, near Hospet, Bellary district
- Devarabelekere Reservoir, Davanagere district
- Dhupdal Dam, River Ghataprabha: constructed in 1883 with a nearby inspection bungalow
- Dhup Reservoir across Ghataprabha, Gokak
- Gajanuru Dam across Tunga River
- Gayathri Reservoir
- Garura Dam Krishna River
- Gersoppa dam /Sharawathi tailrace
- Harangi Reservoir Kushalnagar, Kodagu Dist
- Hemavathi Reservoir (Gorur Dam), Hassan Dist
- Hidkal Jalashaya (Dam) across Ghataprabha
- Iglooru Dam across shimsha river, Mandya Dist
- Kabini Reservoir Beechanahalli, H.D Kote, Mysore Dist
- Kadra Dam, Uttara Kannada district
- Kanva Reservoir
- Karanja Reservoir, Halikhed, Bidar District
- Kempu Hole Dam
- Kodasalli Dam
- Krishna Raja Sagara Dam on Kaveri River
- Lakkavali Dam across Bhadra River
- Linganamakki Dam on Sharavathi River in Sagara Taluk
- Manchinabeli Dam
- Mani Reservoir, near Thirthahalli, Shimoga district
- Munirabad, Koppal District
- Marconhalli Dam, Kunigal, Tumkur Dist
- Nagara Reservoir, near Nagara, Shimoga district
- Narayanapur
- Narayanpur Dam downstream of Almatti Dam
- Nugu Dam, Beerwal, H.D.Kote, Mysore Dist
- Naviltheertha Dam across Malaprabha
- Thumbe Dam across Nethravathi river
- Renuka Sagara Reservoir, Saundatti, Belgaum district
- Savehaklu Reservoir, near Thirthahalli, Shimoga district
- Shanti Sagara or Sulekere Reservoir, Chinnagiri, Davanagere district
- Shirur Dam, near Ankalgi, Belgaum district
- Supa Dam across Kali River, Ganeshgudi near Dandeli and Joida
- Suvarnawathi Dam, Chamarajnagar
- Talakalale Balancing Reservoir, near Sagara, Shimoga district
- Taraka Reservoir, H.D.Kote, Mysore Dist
- Tungabhadra Dam
- Thippagondanahalli Reservoir
- Vani Vilasa Sagara, (Marikanive), Hiriyur, Chitradurga Dist
- Watehole Dam, near Arehalli, Hassan Dist
- Yagachi Dam on the Yagachi River, Belur Taluka, Hassan District
- Gayathri reservoir, Hiriyur taluk, Chitradurga Dist

== Caves ==
Some well known caves in Karnataka are Yana Caves and Kavala Caves and Syntheri rocks in Uttara Kannada district, Sugriva's Cave in Hampi holds similarity to the descriptions of 'Kishkinda' in the epic Ramayana, hundreds of caves in Basava Kalyana in Bidar District.

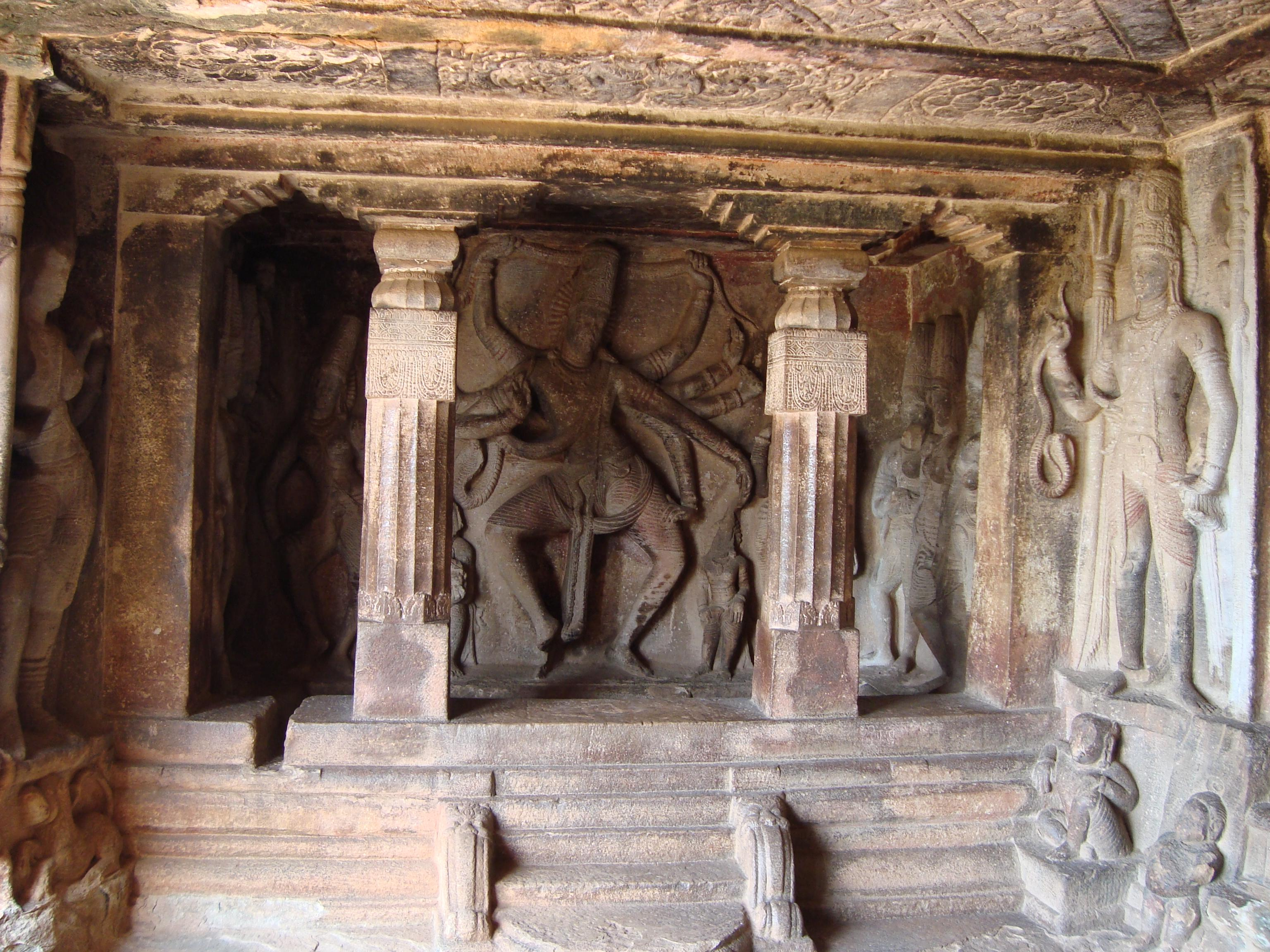
Ravana Phadi Cave, Aihole in Karnataka

- Aihole
- Badami cave temples
- Gavi Gangadhareshwara Temple
- Nellitheertha Cave Temple
- Hulimavu Shiva cave temple
- Pandava Caves Mangalore
- Savandurga
- Kavala Caves
- Anthargange

== Waterfalls ==
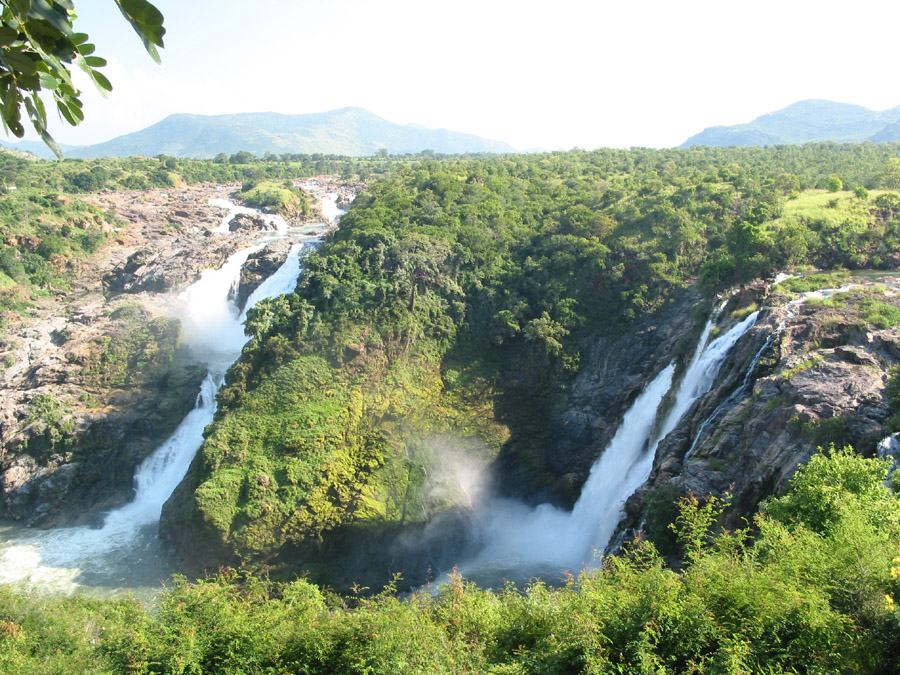
Gaganachukki Falls at Shivanasamudram

Karnataka has a number of waterfalls. Jog Falls of Sagara Taluk is one of the highest waterfalls in Asia. Some well known waterfalls are Varapoha Falls, Magod Falls, Lalgulli Falls, Sathodi Falls, Unchalli Falls, Lushington Falls, Shivaganga Falls, Ulavi Falls, Irupu Falls, Sivasamudram Falls near Shivanasamudra, Balmuri Falls, Gokak Falls, Abbe Falls, Achakanya Falls, Chunchanakatte Falls, Hebbe Falls, Kallathigiri Falls, Sogal Falls, Godachinamalki Falls etc.

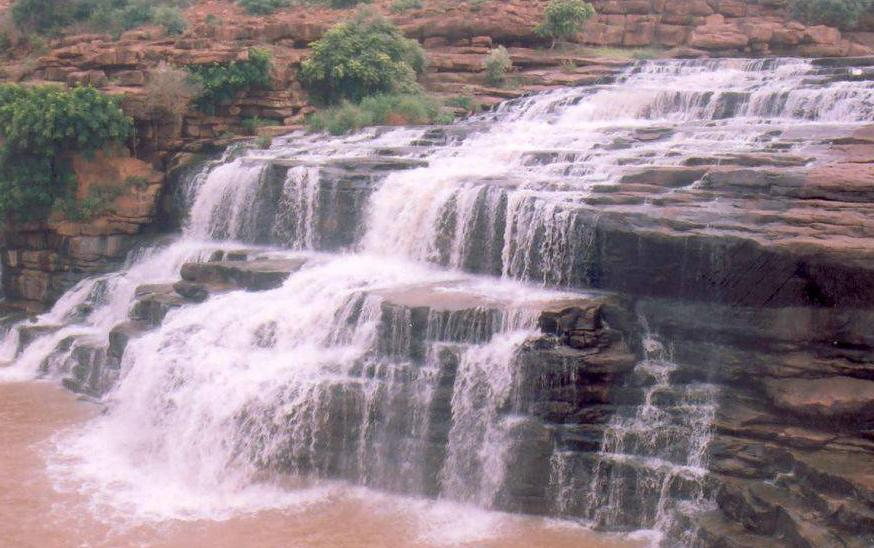
Godachinamalki Falls, Hukkeri Taluk, Belgaum District

- Gokak Falls, Ghataprabha River, near Gokak, Belgaum district: It drops from 52 metres over a sandstone cliff in a gorge. It is known locally as "mini Niagara" Hydro Electric Power has been harnessed at the falls since 1887 to run a cotton mill. Temples near the falls date from Badami Chalukyas to later Chalukya times and Vijayanagara periods. A suspension bridge crosses the river
- Godachinamalki Falls, Markandeya River, near Godchinamalaki, Belgaum district.
- Unchalli Falls, Aghanashini River, Siddapur Taluk: 116 meters in height and named after a district collector who discovered them in 1845
- Magod Falls, Bedti River, 125 km from Karwar: 183 metres (600 feet) in height, consists of a series of cascades over cliffs
- Varapoha Falls, Mahadayi River, in the Jamboti forest

== Eco-tourism ==
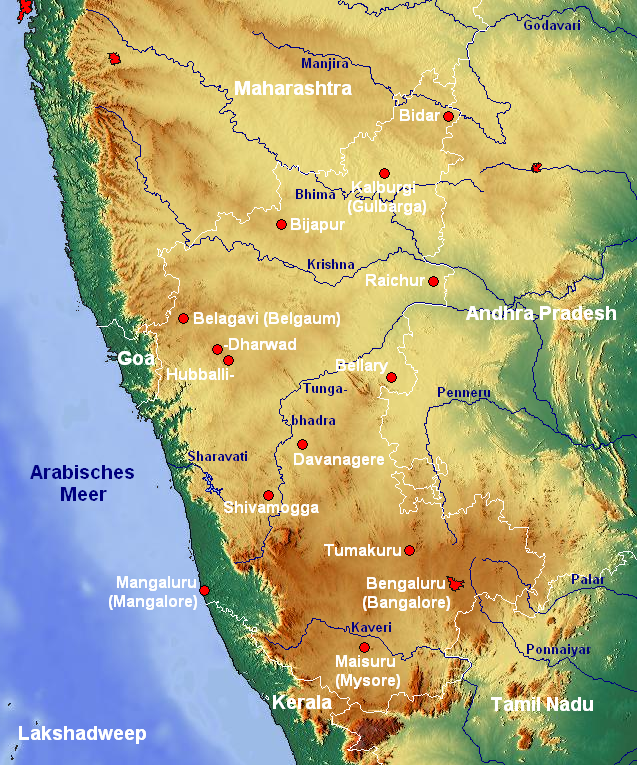
Topographic map of Karnataka. Western Ghats is rich in wildlife.

The districts of the Western Ghats and the southern districts are home to several popular eco-tourism locations, including Kudremukh, Madikeri and Agumbe. Karnataka is notable for having the highest populations of elephants, Gaur bison, and tigers in India, with numbers exceeding 6000, 8000 and 400 respectively. The state's forests are vital habitats for endangered species such as tigers and lepards.

Eco-tourism is a significant activity in Karnataka, with the state leading others in this sector. Jungle Lodges & Resorts, a state-run organization, offers camping and safari facilities in several wildlife sanctuaries. Additionally, private safari providers have emerged in various locations along the Western Ghats.

Nirvana Beach, located near Kumta, is considered one of the finest beaches in the area, featuring a 5 km coastline with white sand and palm trees. It has potential for development into an eco-beach tourism site on the adjacent land classified under CRZ II, within 200 meters from the High Tide Line (HTL). In Goa, farmers and fishermen are permitted by the government and tourism department to operate beach cottages and shacks to attract both international and domestic tourists from September to May each year.

Several NGOs and youth groups are actively involved in birdwatching and other conservation activities throughout Karnataka.

== Adventure and outdoor activities ==
Adventure tourism has been growing at a pace of around 24% in Karnataka. The presence of Nilgiris, Western Ghats, rocky regions, waterfalls and lots of lakes and rivers make it an attractive destination. Certain activities at some regions namely Rock climbing at Hampi and Ramnagaram; Mountain biking at Nilgiris; Rafting at Honnemaradu in Sagara, Bheemeshwari, Dandeli and Coorg are famous.

Besides this Sawandurga, Manchinbele (Feverpitch basecamp), Bheemeshwari Antharagange are also famous for rappelling, river crossing, caving and kayaking. There have been more than 100 places for trekking in Karnataka and many of them are organised by Government of Karnataka or government approved local vendors. Seasonal surfing is available in Gokarna and Kaup. Fever pitch base camp has been developed by tourism industry professionals which is located 40 km from Bangalore near Magadi.

Bisle Ghat which is stretch of Western ghats from Kerala to Gujarat is also famous for trekking and adventurous activities. Farmers son Paintball arena and other ATV & Dirtbike sports are some of the things to do at Hassan.

Karnataka tourism initiated efforts to promote motorcycle and adventure tourism across the state, working to establish designated camping sites for backpackers and motorcyclists.

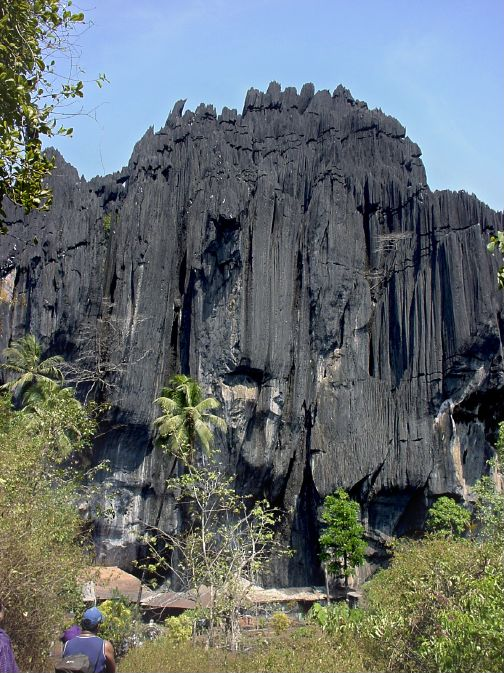
Yana rock formations

Rock climbers visit several areas in Karnataka:

- Yana, Uttara Kannada
- Ramanagara, 50 km from Bangalore.
- Shivagange, Bangalore district
- Tekal, Kolar district
- Turahalli Forest
- Hampi
- Kunti Betta
- Anthargange, Kolar
- Skandagiri, Bangalore
- Devarayandurga, Tumkur
- Karadigudda, Magadi

Trekking in Karnataka. Some of the most popular treks are:

- Dandeli
- Tadiyandamol Trek (Coorg)
- Kodachadri Trek
- Bheemeshwari Trek
- Kudremukh Trek
- Shakaleshpur Trek
- Dabbe falls (Sagara)
- Karwar Beach trek
- Madhugiri Fort Trek
- Sawandurga Trek
- Agumbe Rain Forest trek
- Makalidurga Trek
- Kumara Parvatha Trek(Pushpagiri)
- Green Route

== Healthcare tourism ==
In the last couple of years Karnataka has emerged as a hot spot for health care tourism in India attracting health tourists from all over the world. Karnataka has highest number of approved health systems and alternative therapies. Along with some ISO certified government owned hospitals, private institutions which provide international quality services have caused health care industry to grow up to 30% during 2004–05. Hospitals in Karnataka treat around 8,000 and more health tourists every year.

== The Golden Chariot ==
The Golden Chariot is a luxury tourist train of Karnataka operated by Indian Railways and KSTDC (Karnataka State Tourism Development Corporation). Initially train was introduced exclusively for Karnataka, but recently it is expanded to whole south India. The train travels to the Karnataka's tourist destinations like Bangalore, Kabini, Mysore, Beluru, Halebidu, Shravanabelagola, Hampi, Badami, Pattadakal, Aihole and Goa.

Train coaches are named after the Karnataka dynasties like Kadamba, Hoysala, Rashtrakuta, Ganga, Chalukya, Bahamani, Adil Shahi, Sangama, Satavahana, Yadukula and Vijayanagar.

== Administration ==
Karnataka Tourism is the popular name of the Department of Tourism, Government of Karnataka (website: karnatakatourism.org).

Karnataka Tourism is responsible for the sustainable development of tourism in Karnataka along with marketing of the destination worldwide. Karnataka's destination branding and marketing is done by India's leading tourism marketing organisation, Stark Communications. Stark is part of The Stark Group under whose umbrella are companies such as Stark Communications, Stark Expo, Starkworld Publishing, Stark Expo, starkwebworks, Stark Tourism Forum.

Karnataka Tourism develops hospitality infrastructure through two government-owned companies, Jungle Lodges & Resorts and Karnataka State Tourism Development Corporation.

== See also ==
- Tourism in India

Archaeological sites and Monuments in Karnataka

Excavation
Sannati·Kanaganahalli

Ancient
Lakshmeshwar .Lakkundi . Sudi . Badami . Aihole . Pattadakal . Hangal . Halasi . Banavasi . Halebid . Belur . Mahadeva Temple (Itagi) . Hooli . Sannati . Hampi . Anegundi . Maski . Koppal

Forts
Gajendragad . Saundatti . Bellary . Parasgad Fort . Kittur . Belgaum . Bidar . Gulbarga . Basavakalyan . Koppal . Chitradurga

Monuments
Lakshmeshwar . Lakkundi . Sudi . Badami . Aihole . Pattadakal . Hangal . Halasi . Banavasi . Halebid . Belur . Somanathapura . Mahadeva Temple (Itagi) . Hooli . Sannati . Hampi . Anegundi . Galaganatha . Chaudayyadanapura . Bidar · Gulbarga · Bijapur · Raichur

Photo Gallery
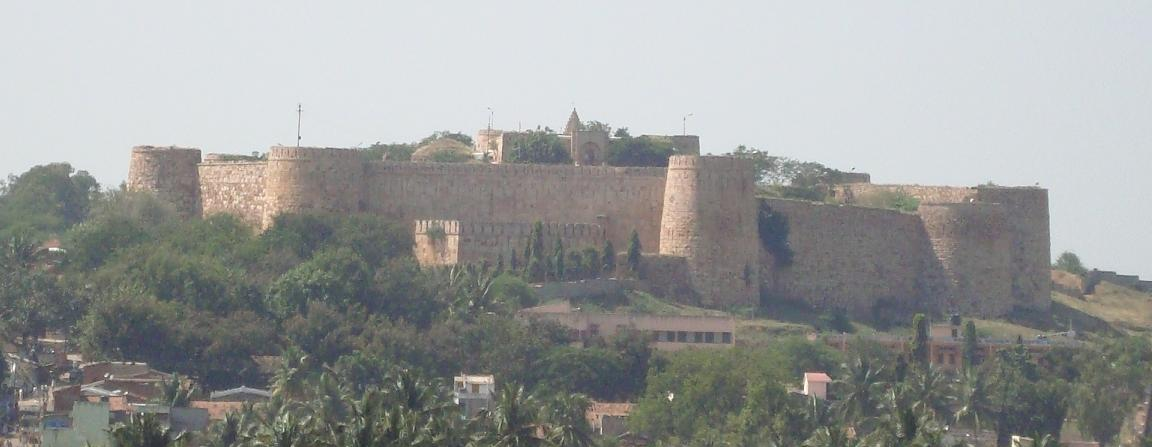
Saundatti Fort, North Karnataka.

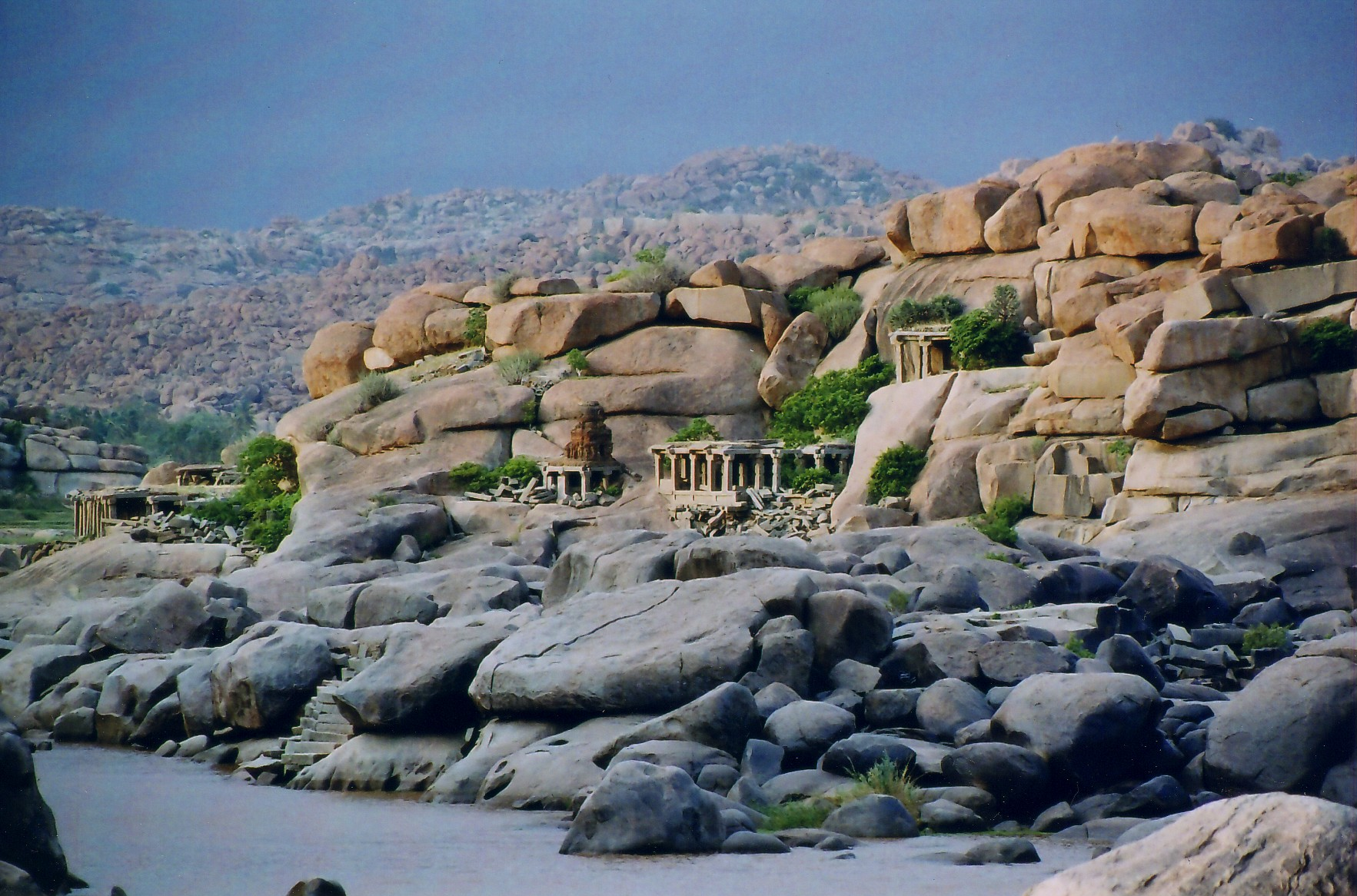
Hampi

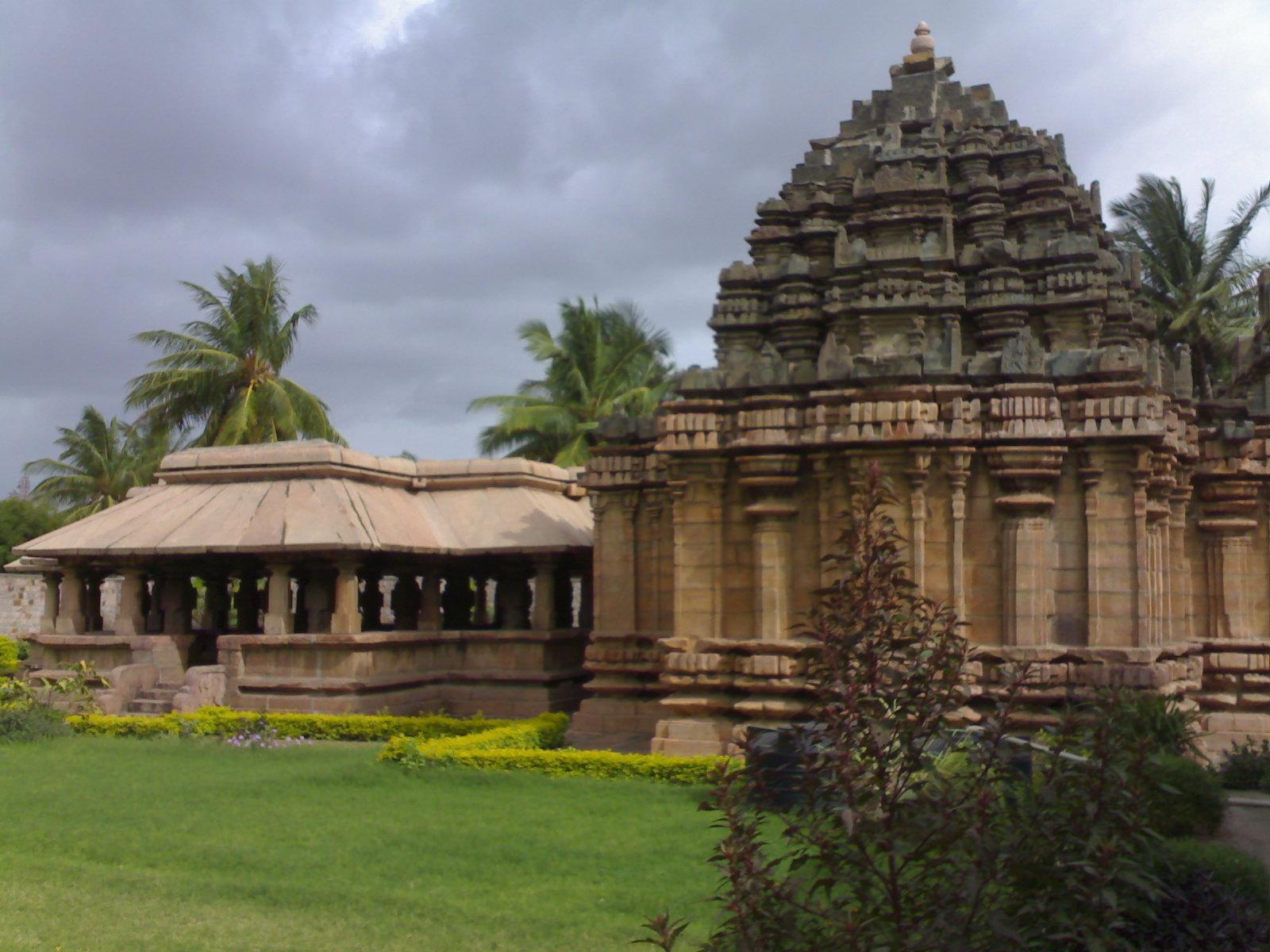
Hooli Panchalingeshwara temple.

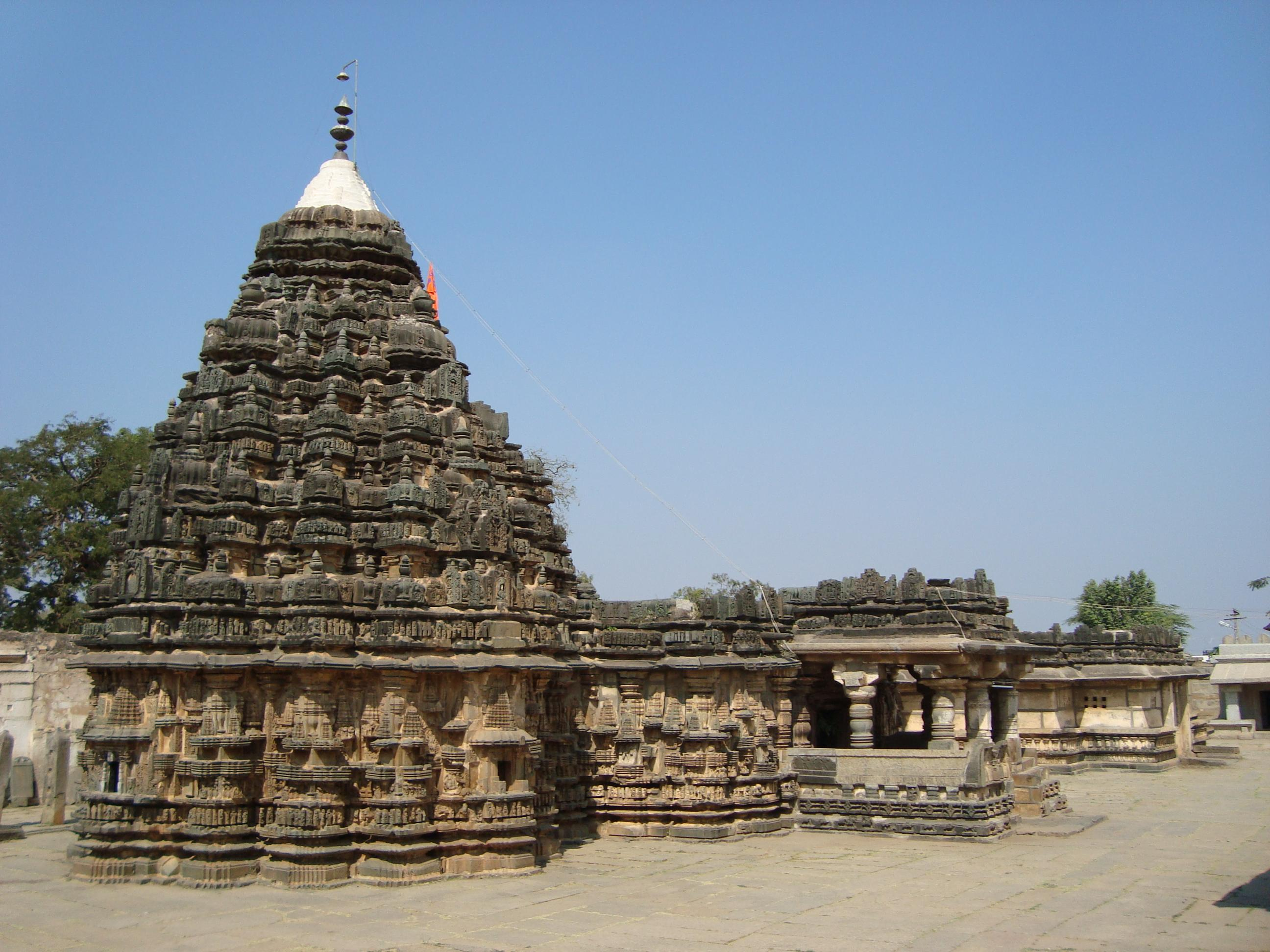
Someshwara temple at Lakshmeshwara, North Karnataka.

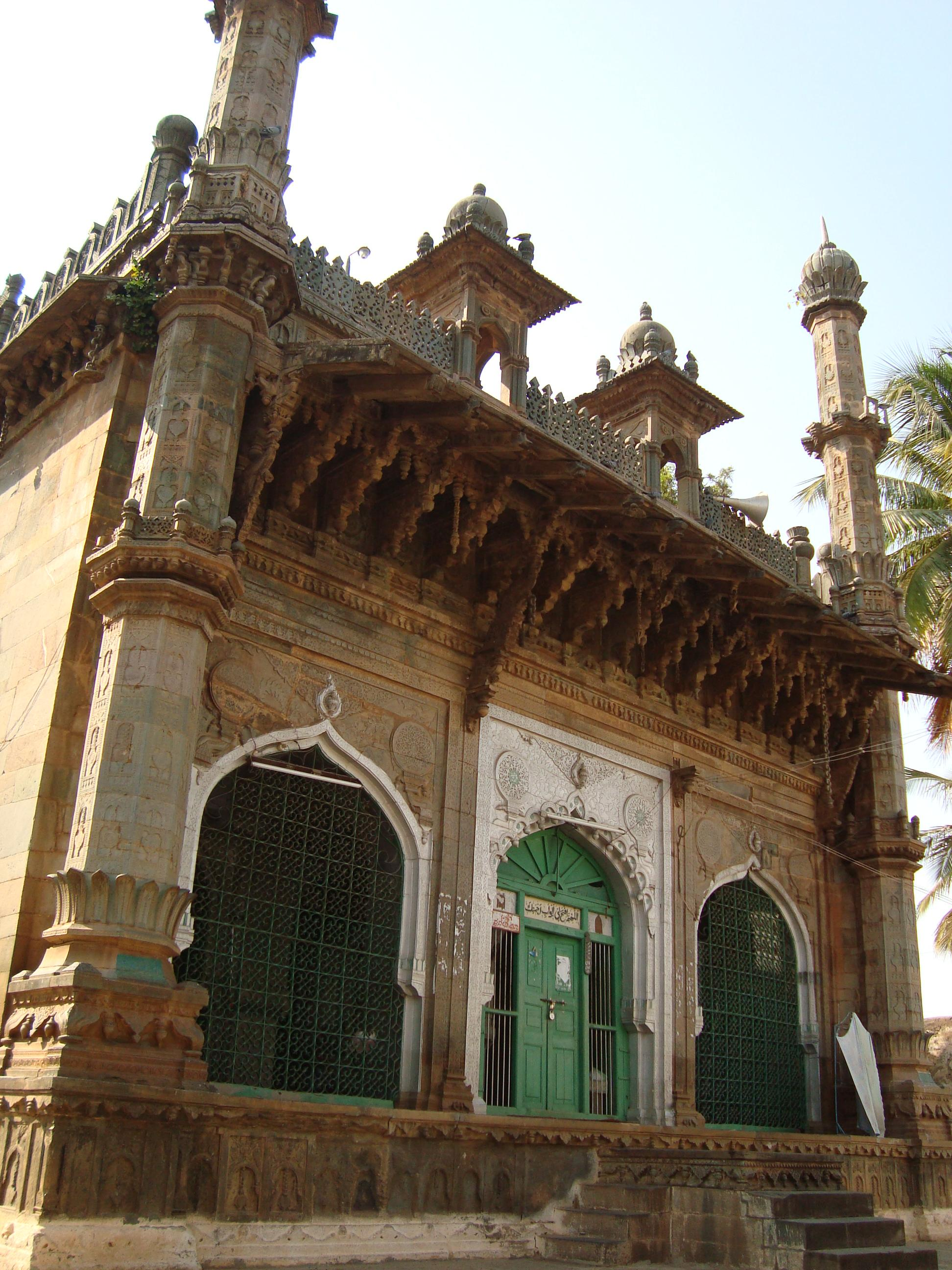
Jumma Masjid at Lakshmeshwara, North Karnataka.

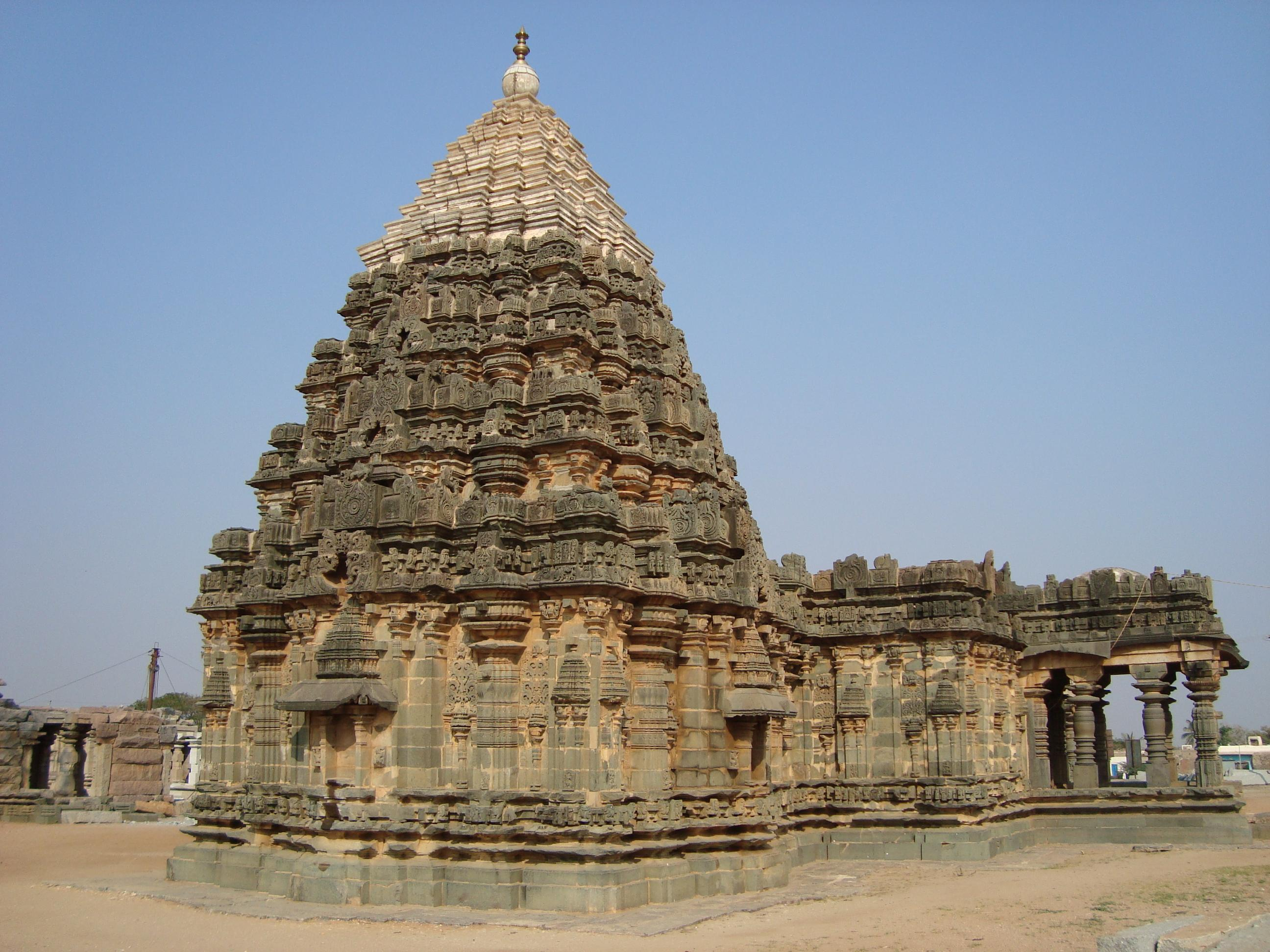
Mahadeva Temple (Itagi) (or Ittagi) in the Koppal district, Karnataka.

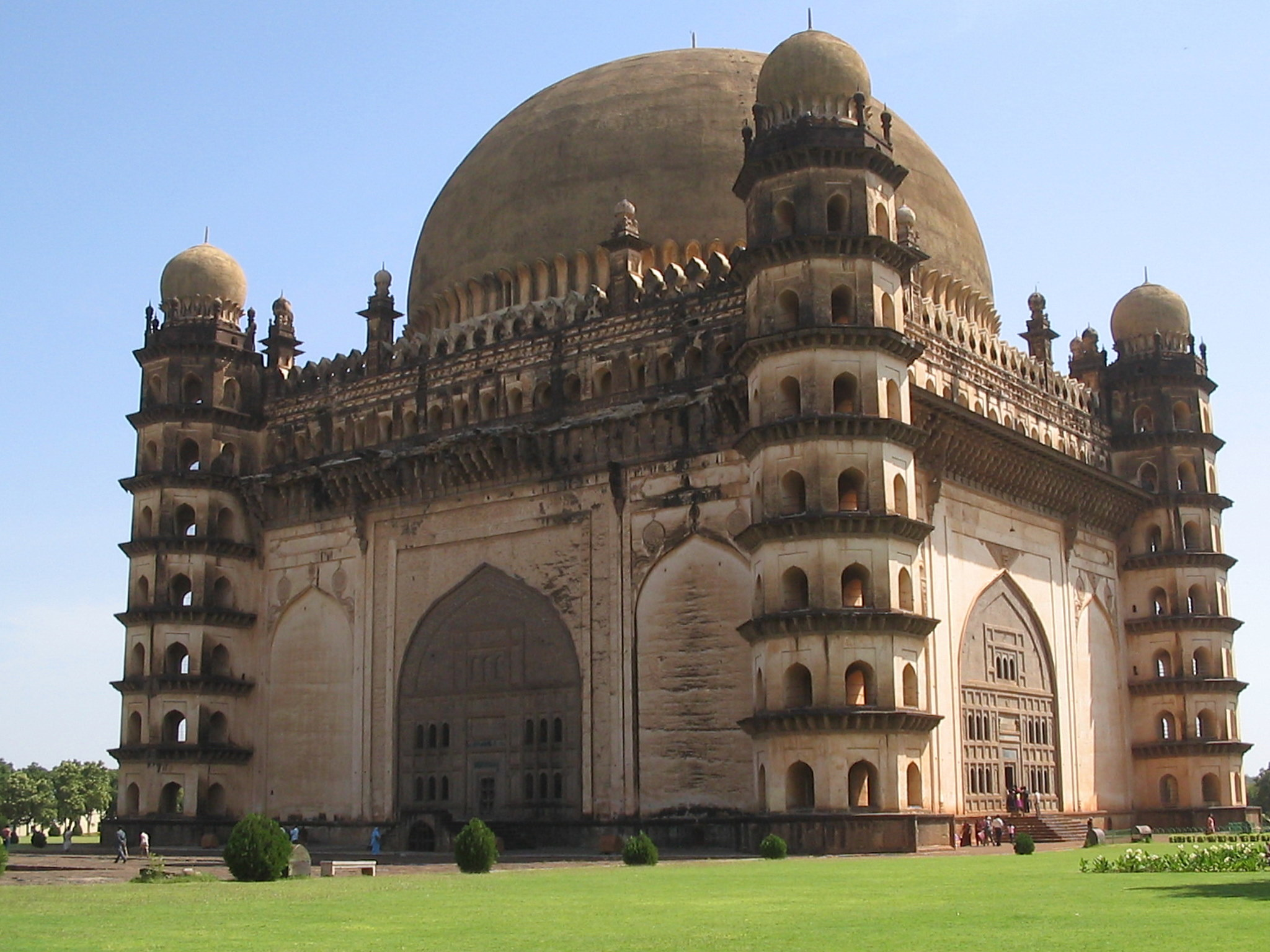
Gol Gumbaz at Bijapur, has the second largest pre-modern dome in the world after the Byzantine Hagia Sophia.

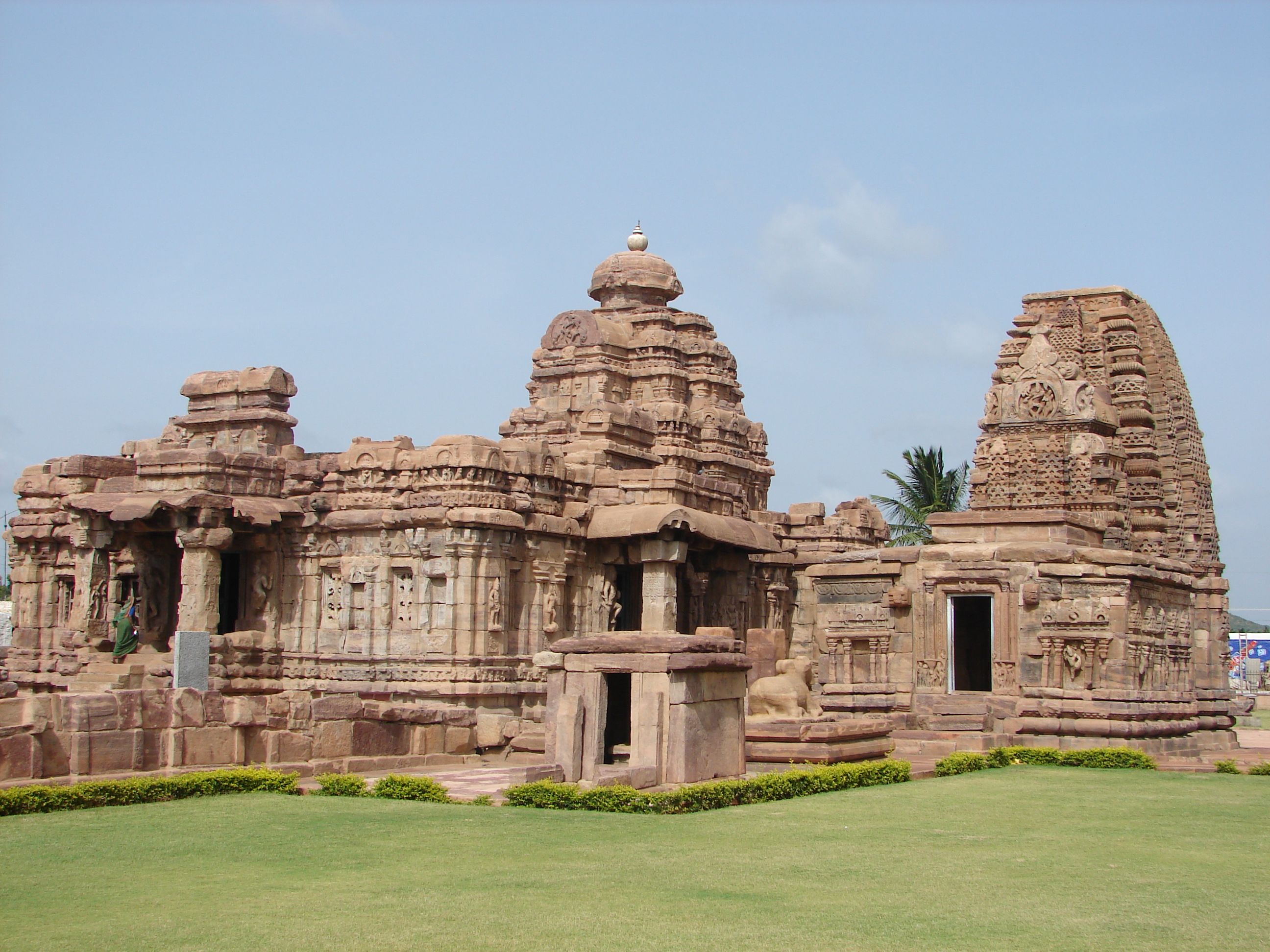
Mallikarjuna temple and Kashi Vishwanatha temple at Pattadakal, North Karnataka.

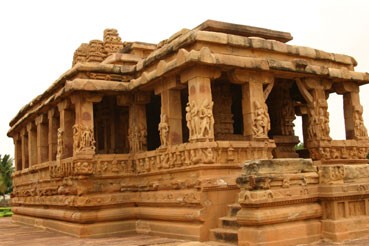
Aihole Temples.

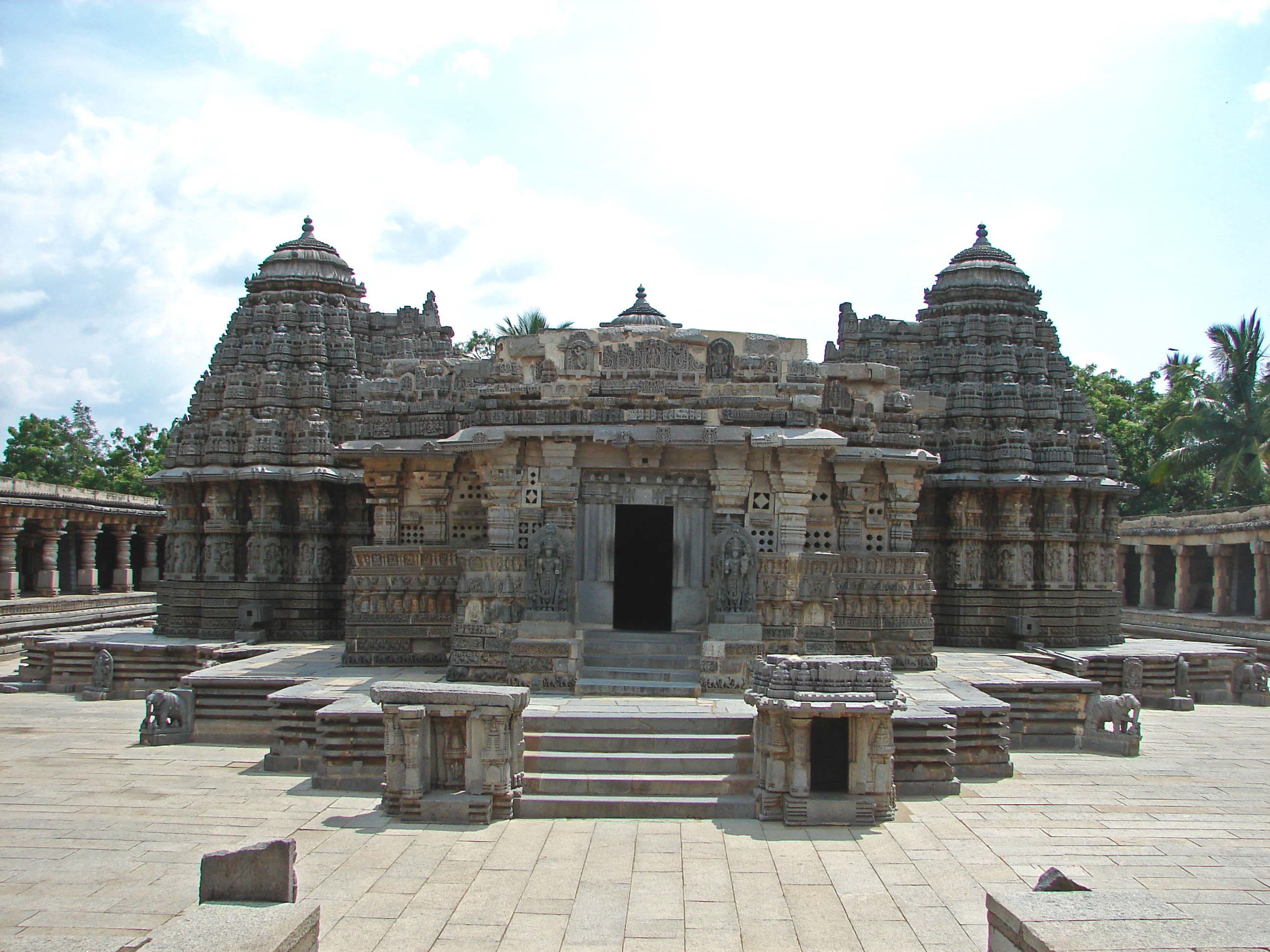
Keshava temple (1268 CE), Somanathapura.

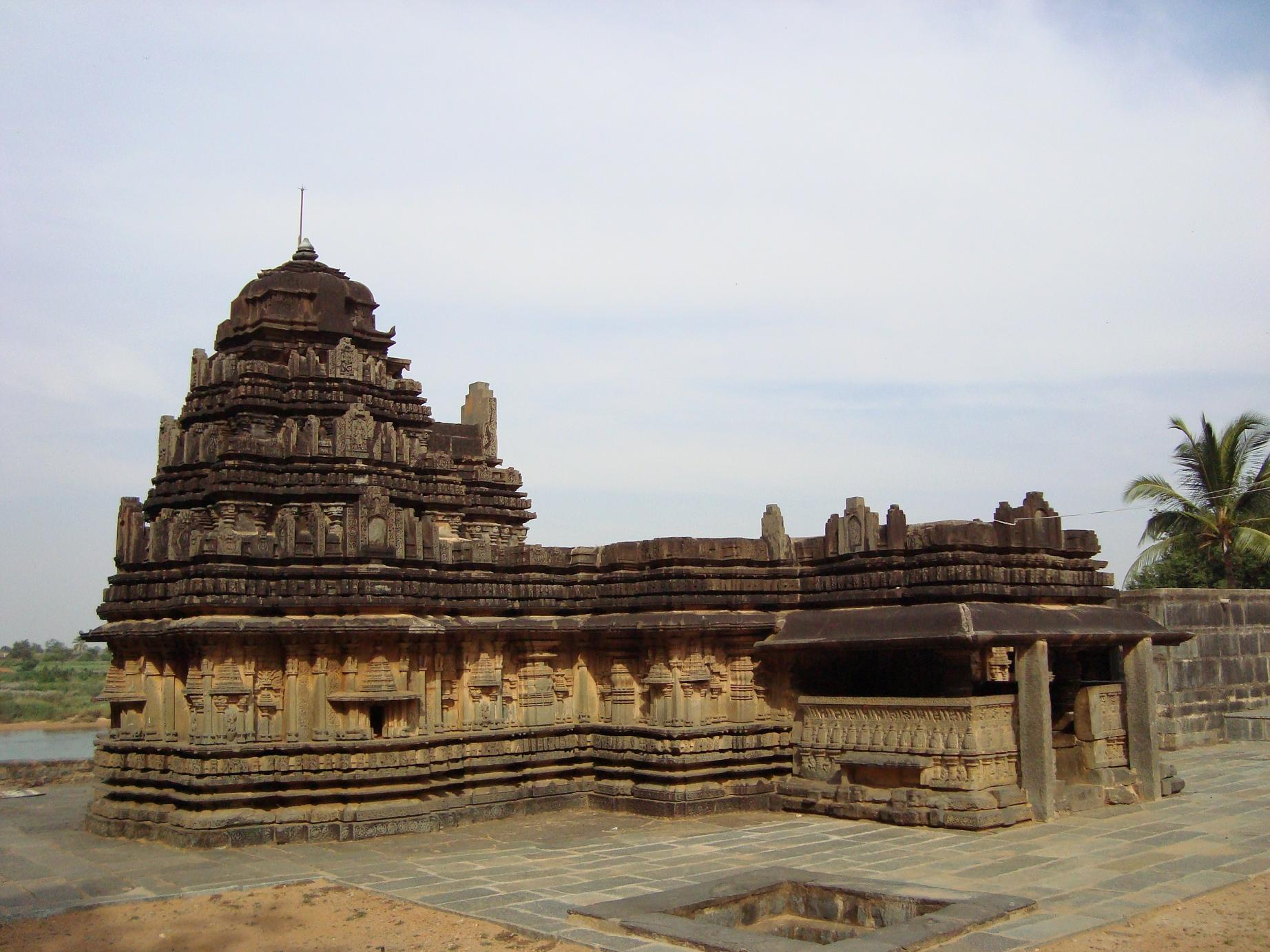
Chaudayyadanapura Mukteshwara temple, Ranebennur, North Karnataka

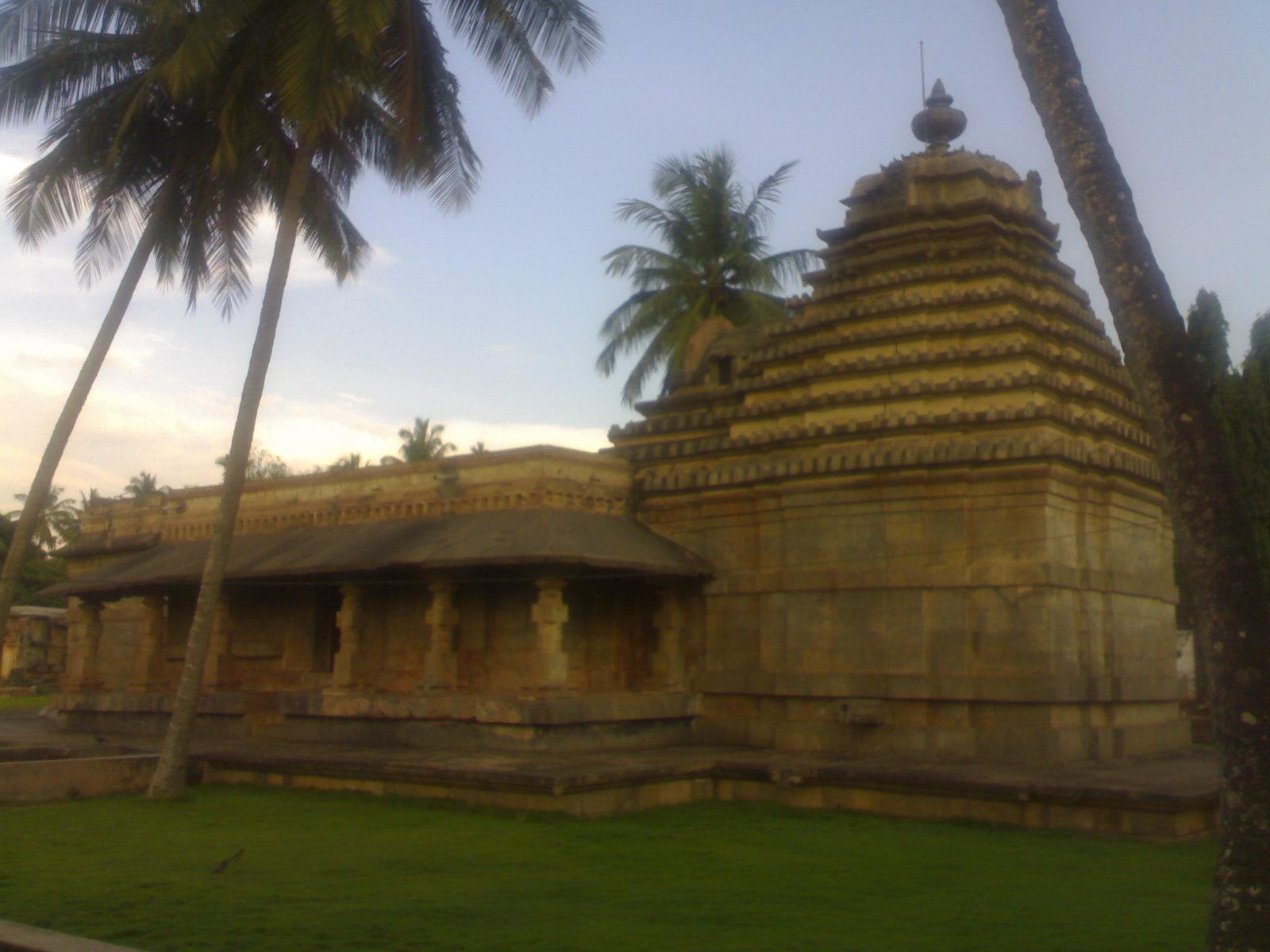
Bhuvaraha Narasimha temple Halasi, North Karnataka.

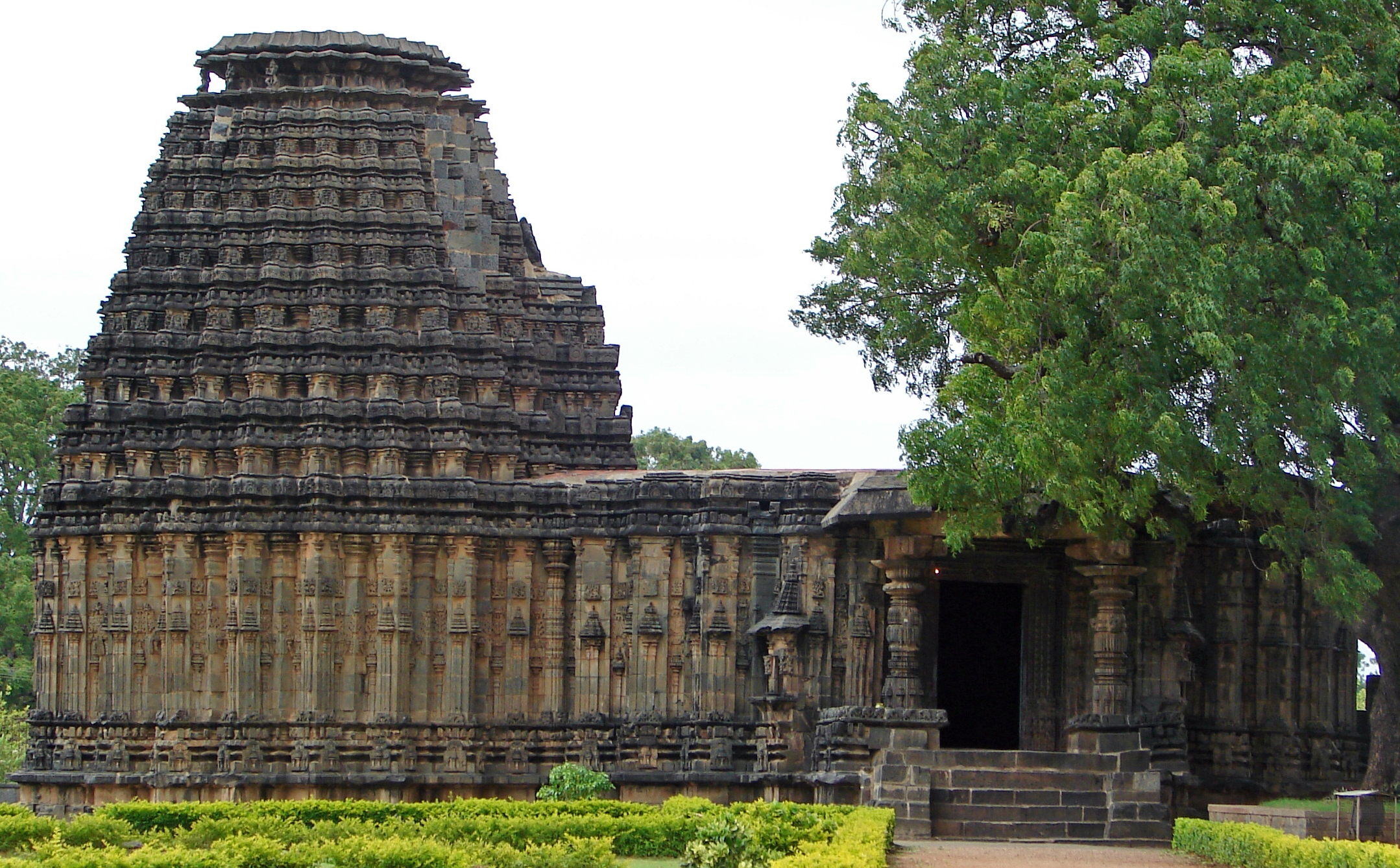
Dodda Basappa Temple at Dambal, a unique 24-pointed, uninterrupted stellate (star-shaped), 7-tiered dravida plan, 12th century.

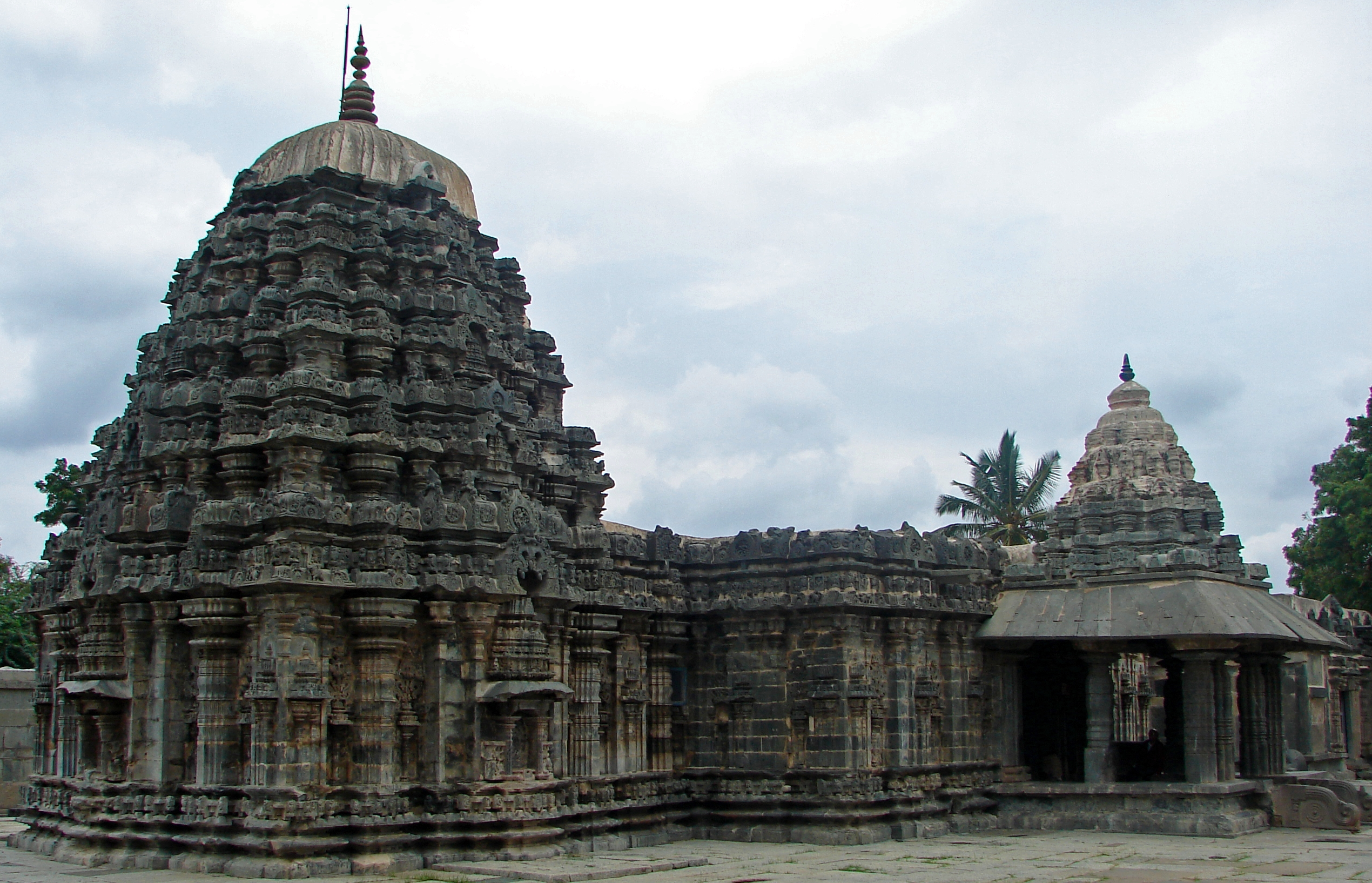
Annigeri Amriteshwara Temple.

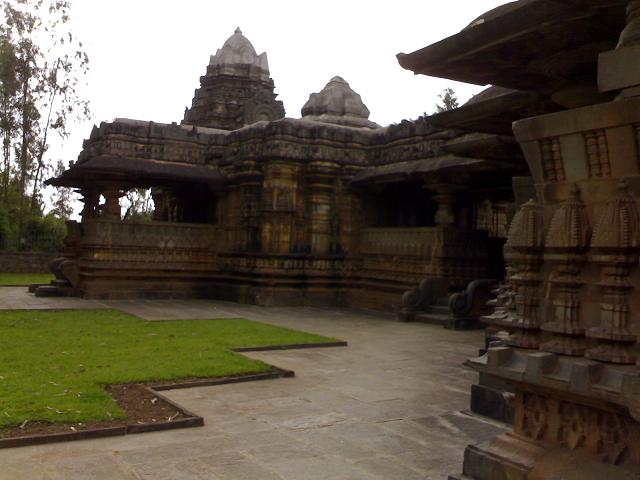
Tarakeshwara temple at Hangal.

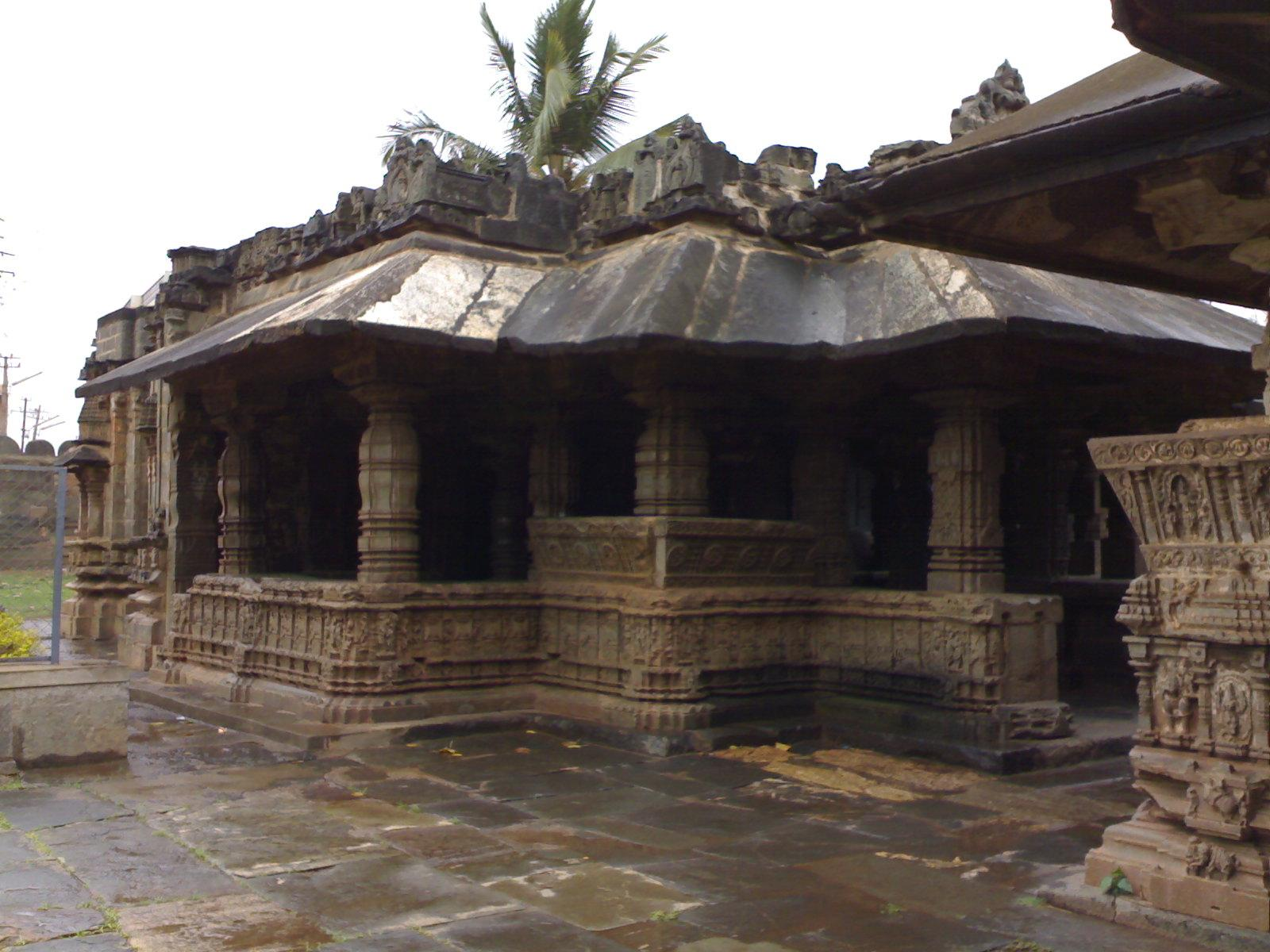
Trikuteshwara Temple complex at Gadag.

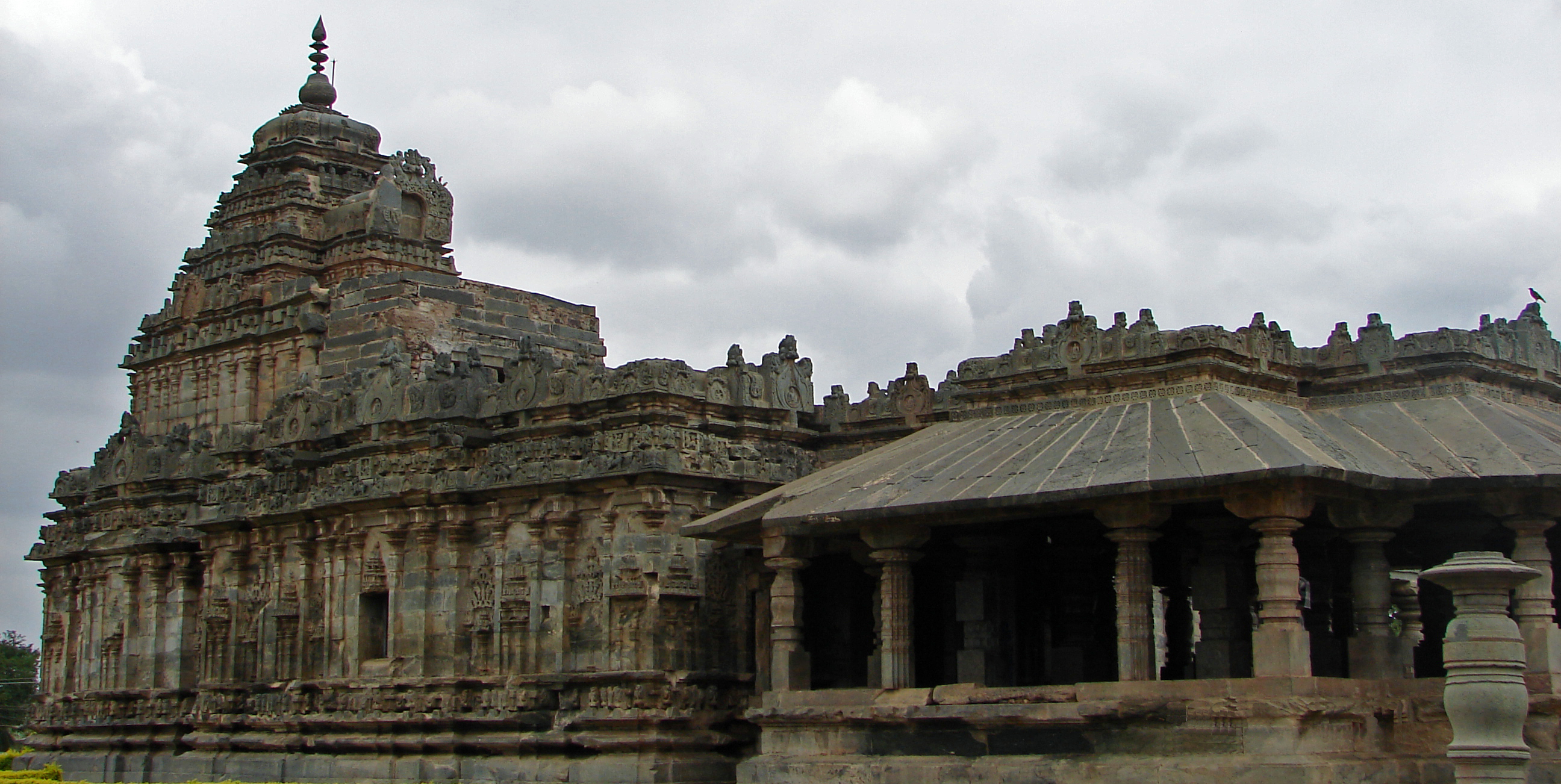
Jain temple at Lakkundi in Gadag district, Karnataka.

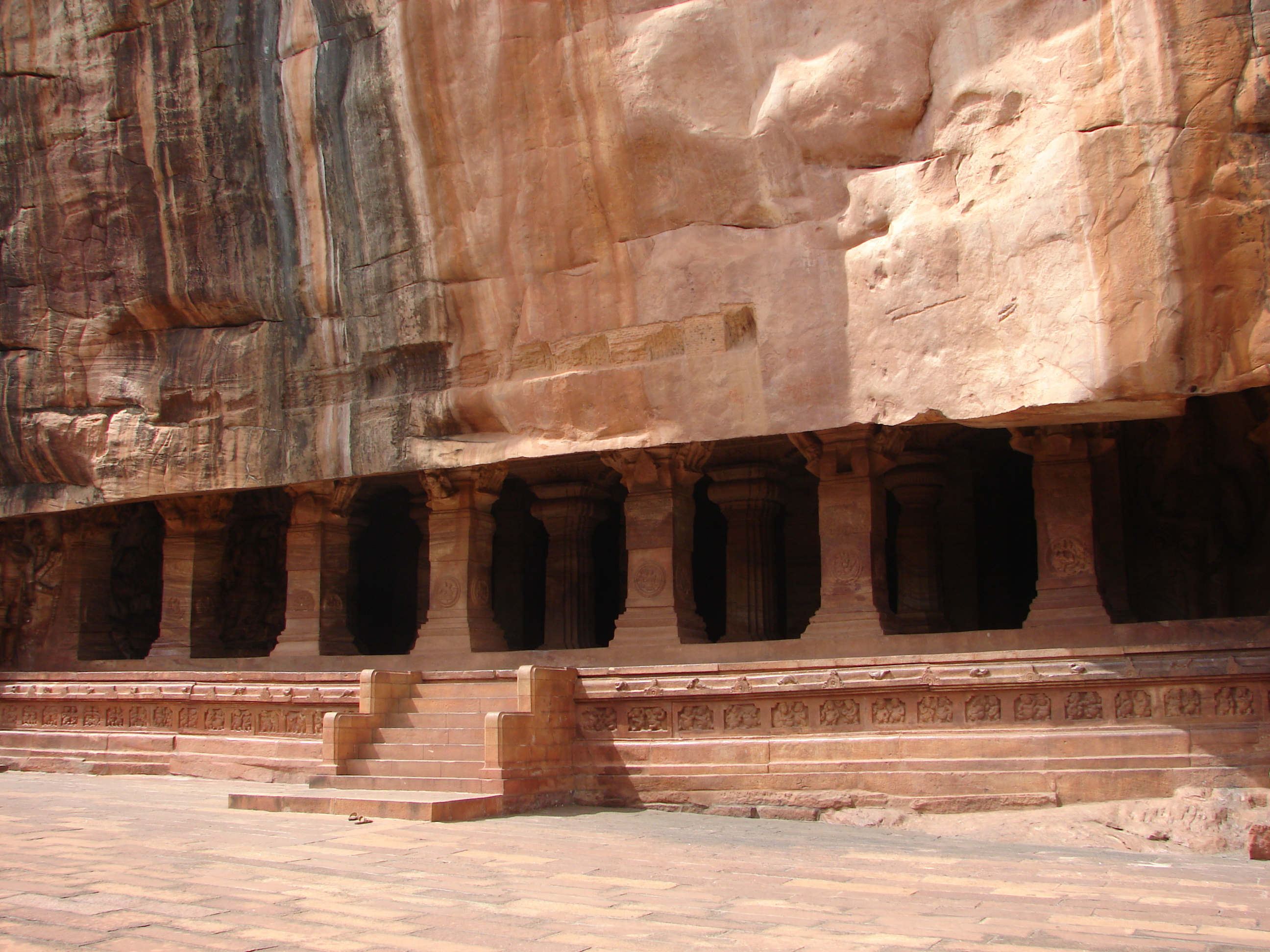
Badami Cave Temples.

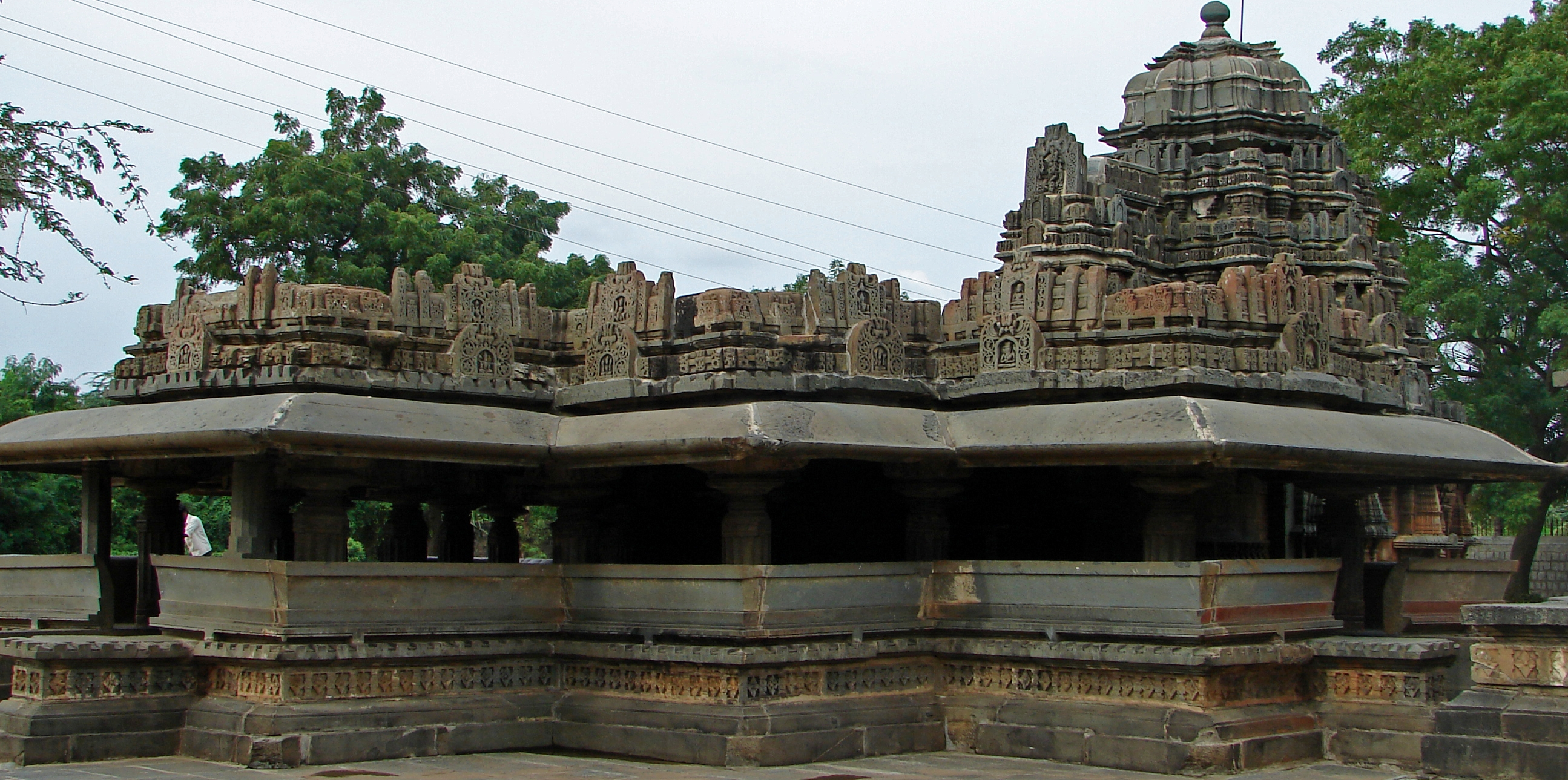
Siddeshvara temple in Haveri.

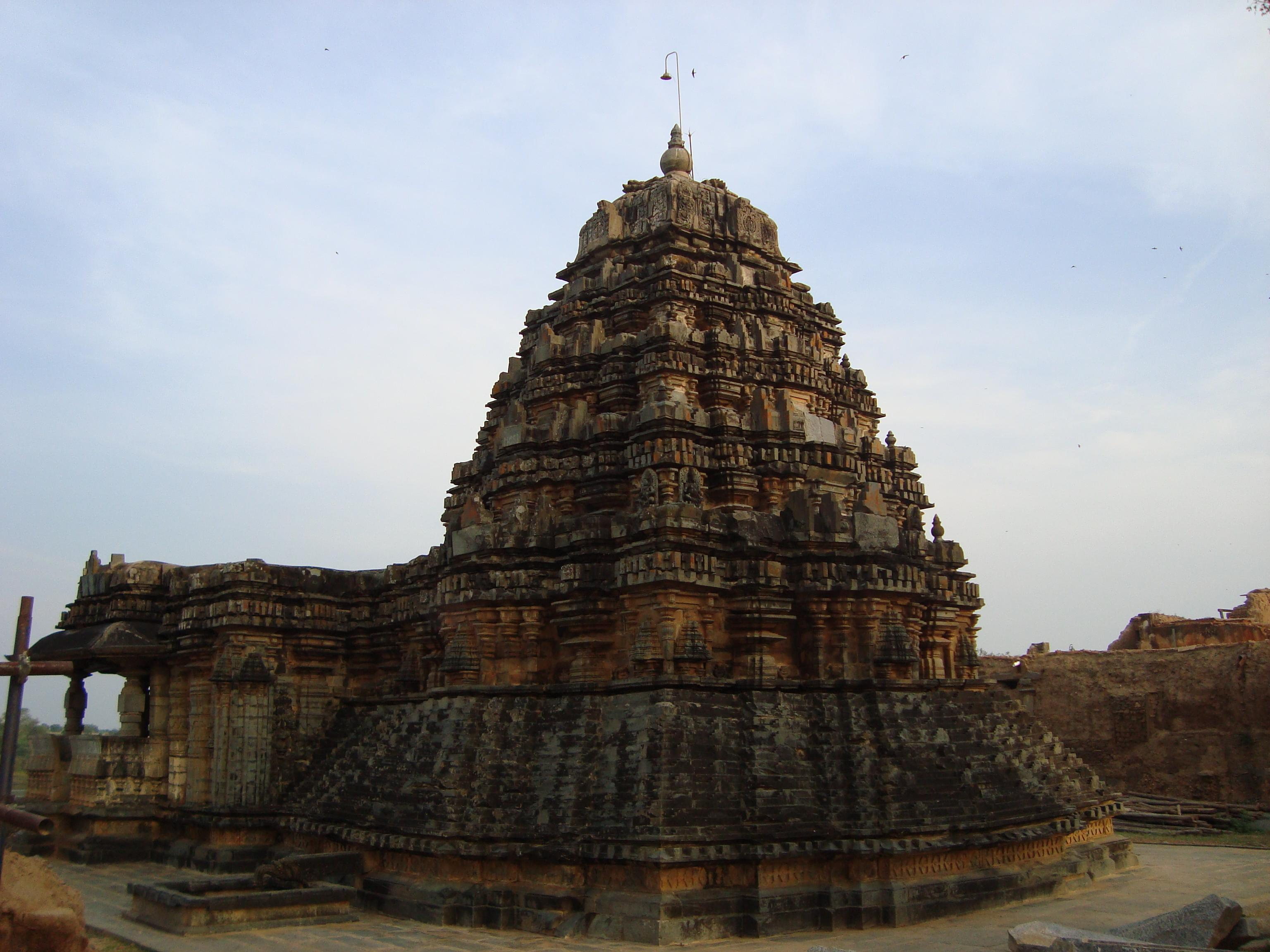
Galageshwara Temple at Galaganatha, North Karnataka

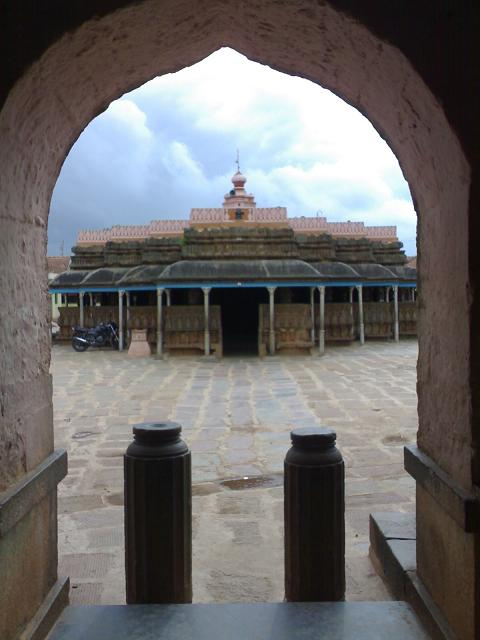
Kundgol Shambhulinga Temple.

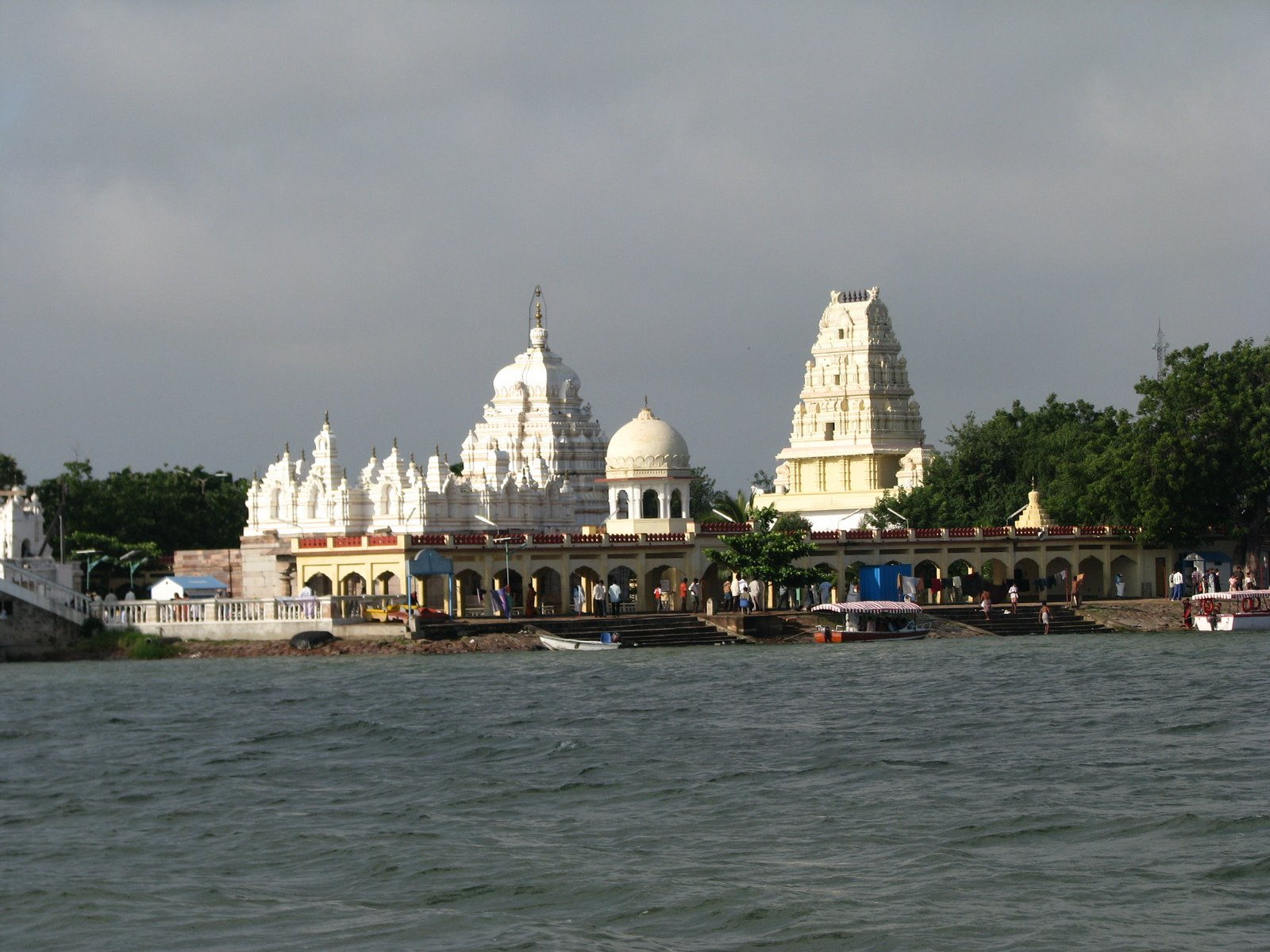
Kudalasangama

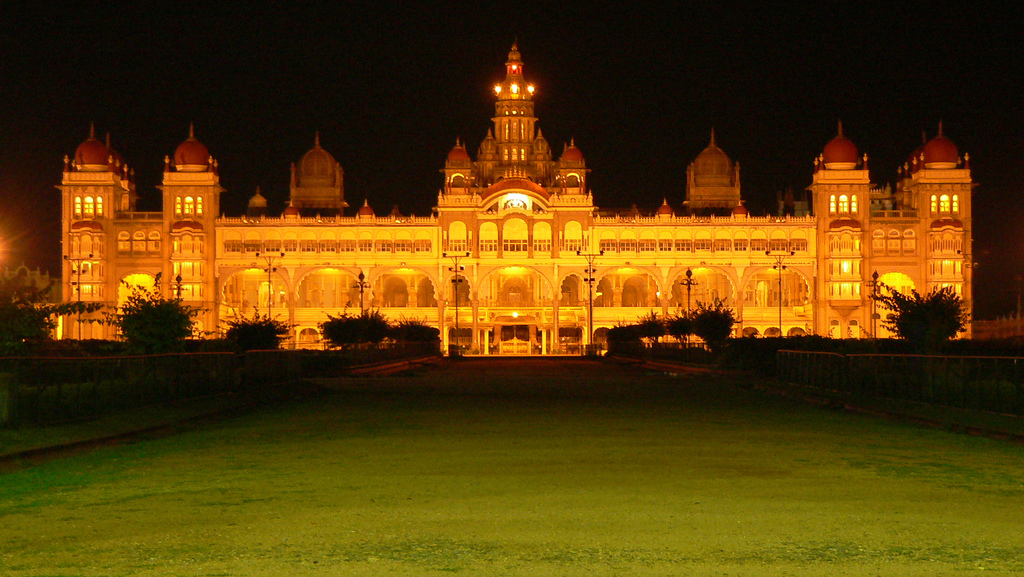
Mysore Palace at Mysore is one of the most visited monuments in India.

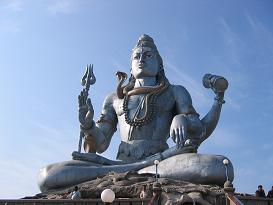
Shiva Statue on Murudeshwara hill. One of the tallest statues of Hindu deity Shiva.

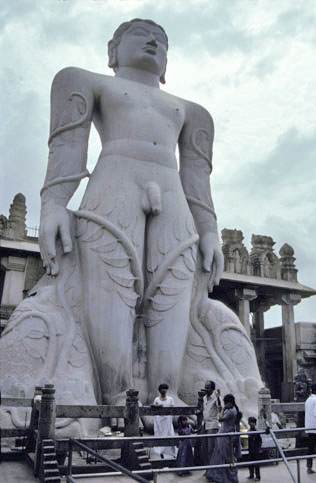
The Gomateswara (982–983) monolith at Shravanabelagola, one of the foremost centres of Jain pilgrimage.

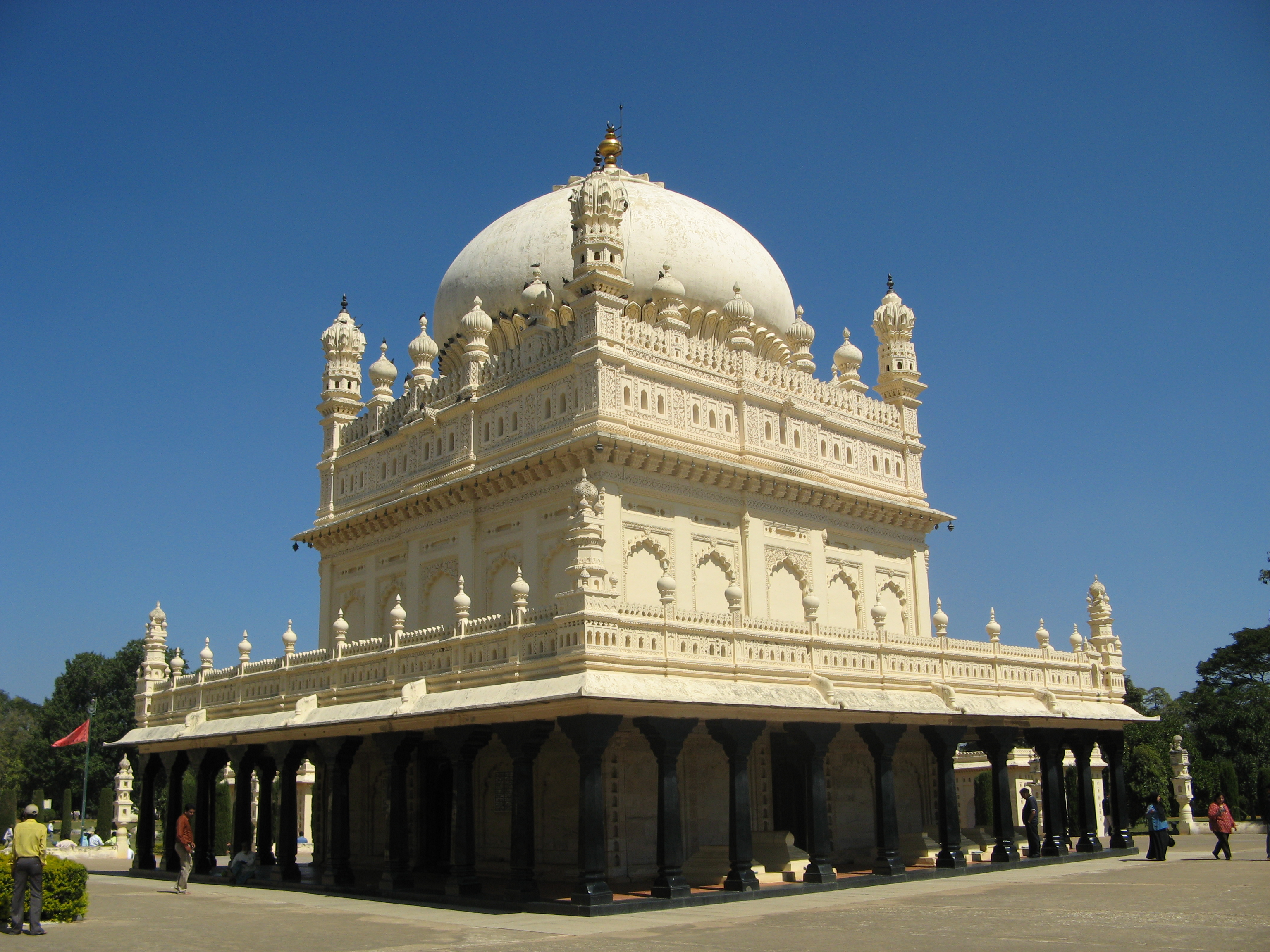
The mausoleum housing Tippu Sultan and his father Hyder Ali at Srirangapatna.

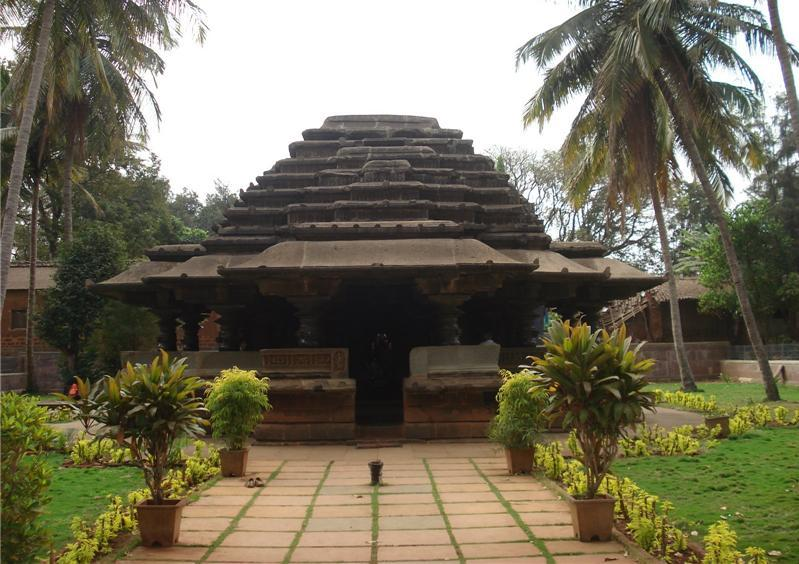
Kamal Basadi Jain temple Belgaum.

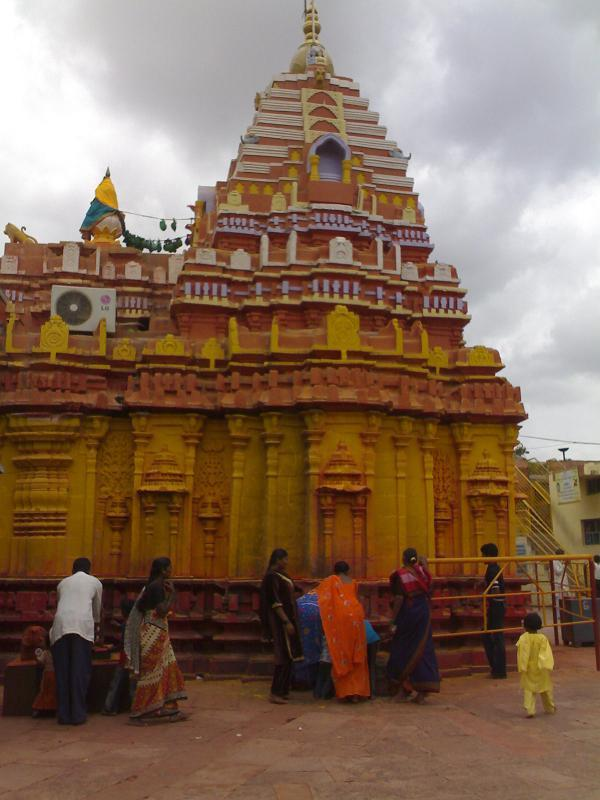
Renuka temple Saundatti, North Karnataka.

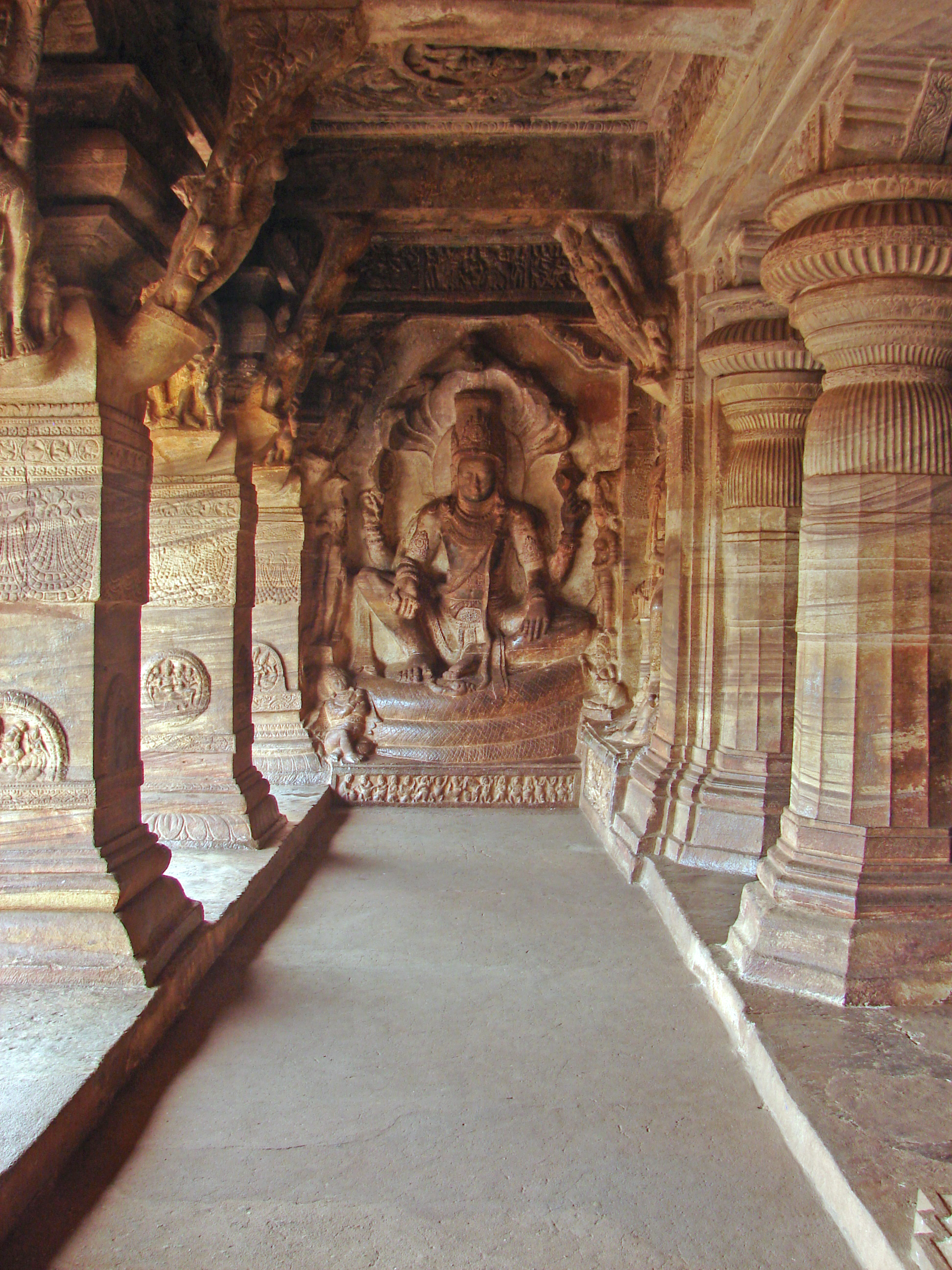
Vishnu image in Cave temple No. 3, Badami, North Karnataka.

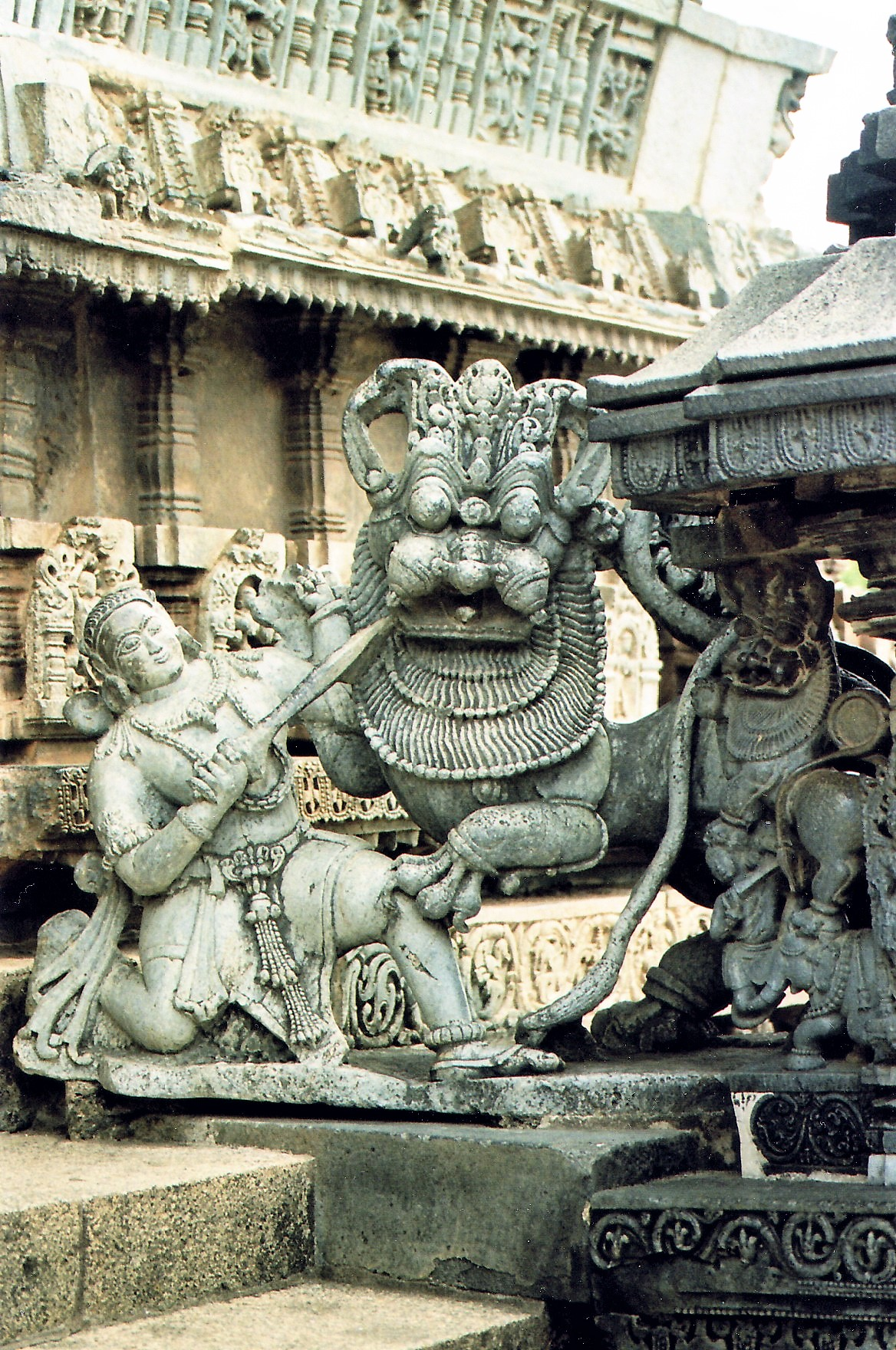
Sala fighting the tiger, the symbol of Hoysala Empire in Belur, Karnataka.

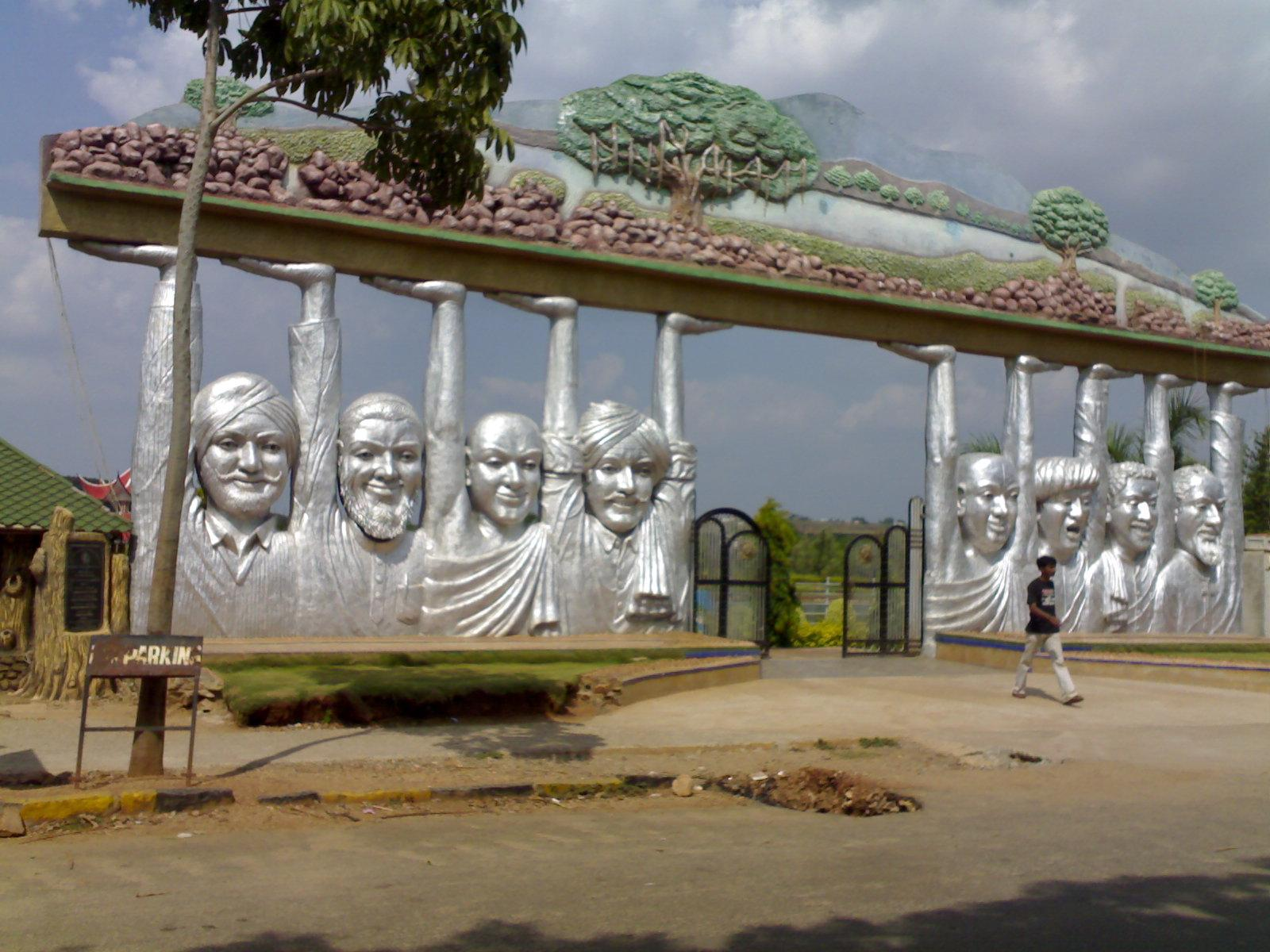
Almatti Dam Rock Garden, North Karnataka.

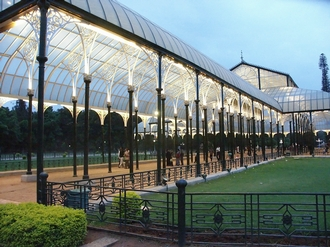
The Lal Bagh Glass House, famous for its flower shows, is now a heritage monument.

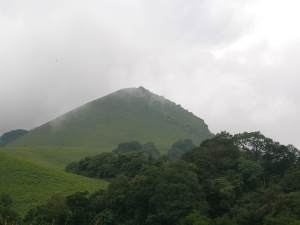
Nari motte or Tiger hill, Brahmagiri, Karnataka.

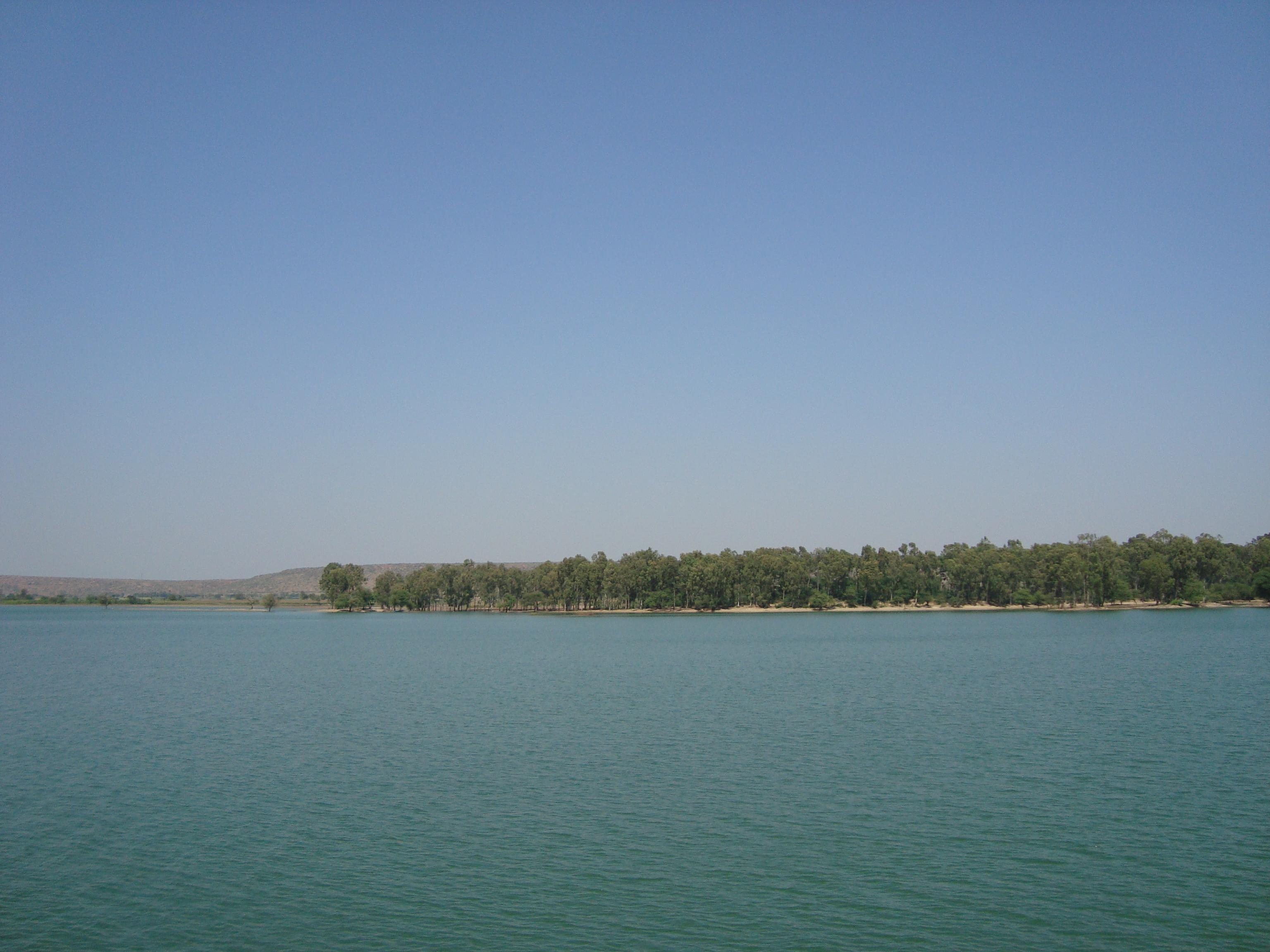
Navilateertha, near Saundatti, North Karnataka

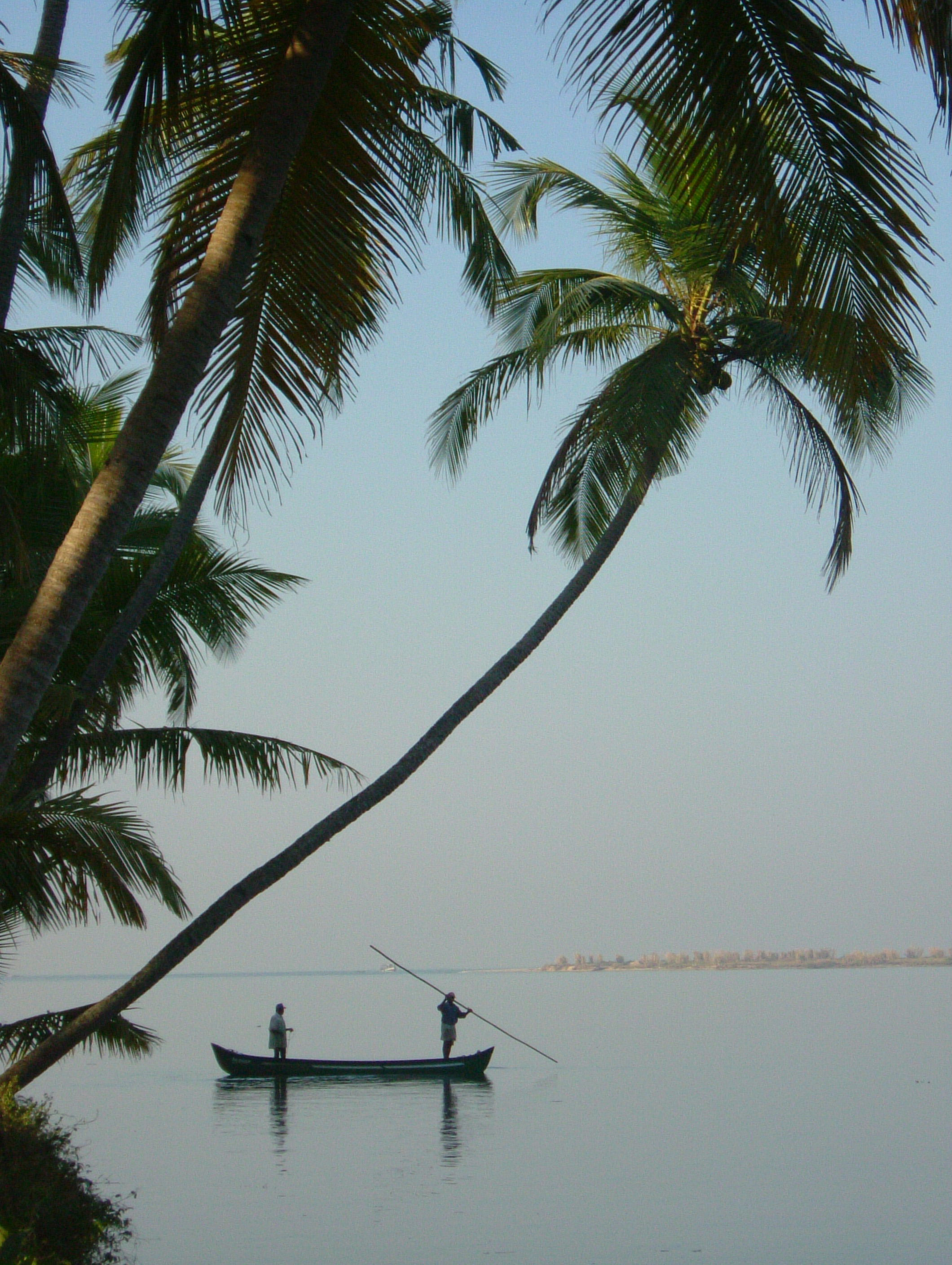
Fishing in Mukkah, near Mangalore.

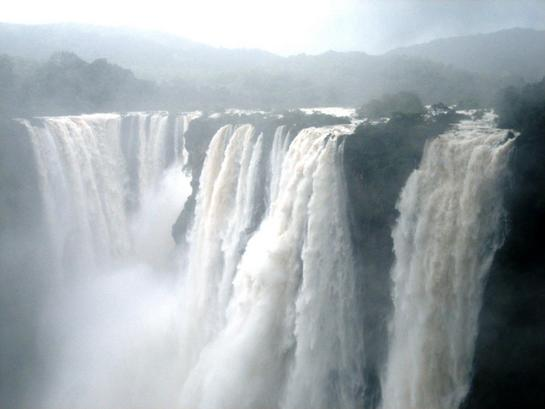
Jog Falls in Shimoga District is one of the highest waterfalls in Asia.

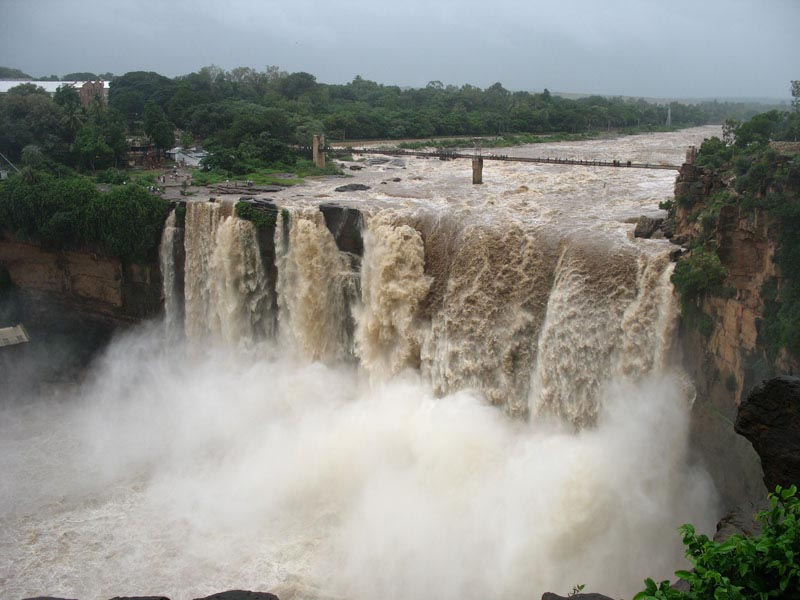
Gokak Falls (Ghataprabha river): Asia's first hydro-electricity power generation unit setup in the 1880s.

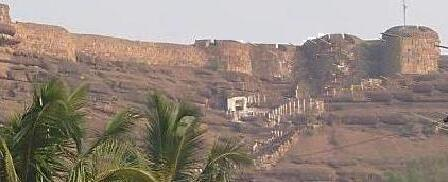
Gajendragad Fort

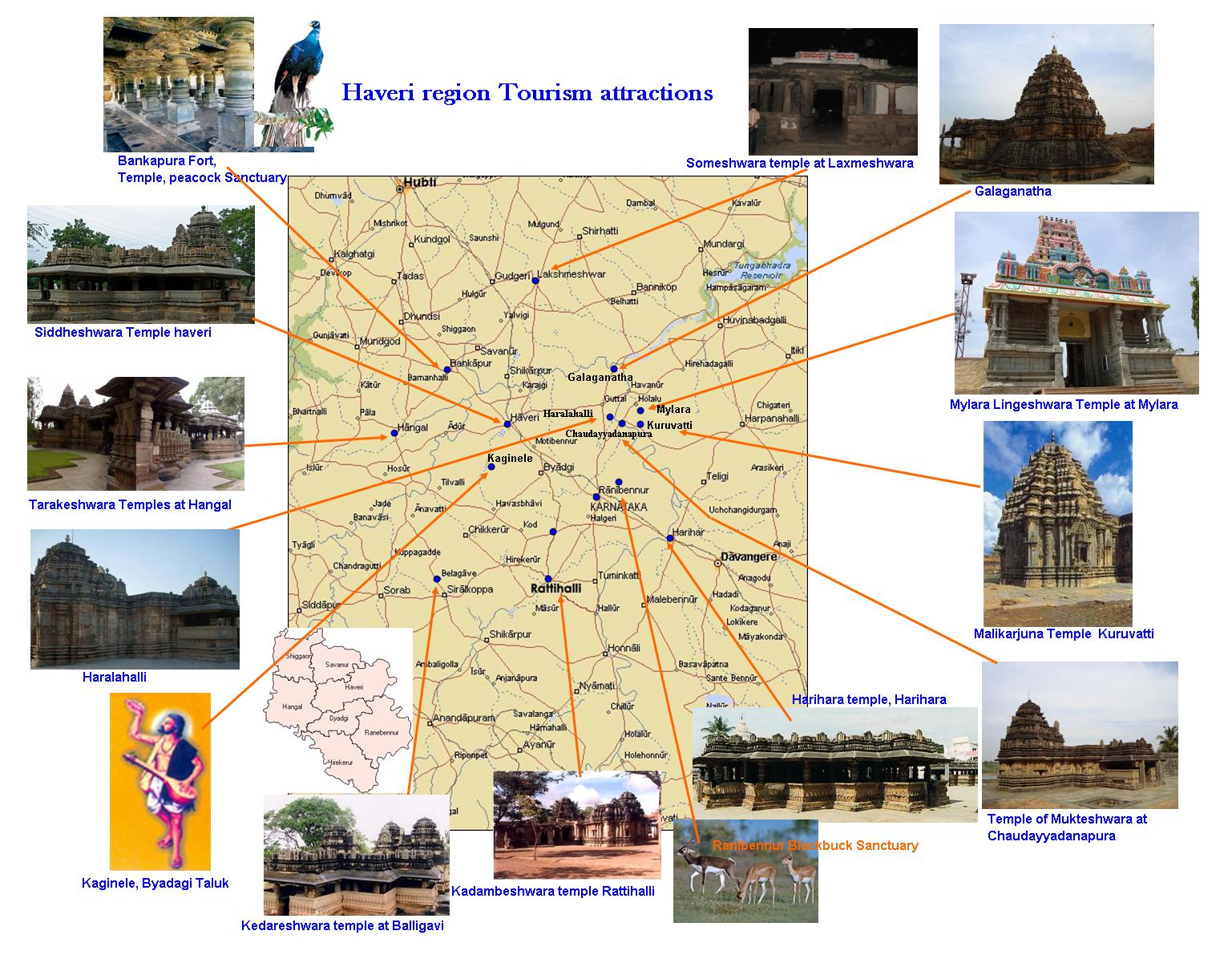
Haveri region Tourism map, North Karnataka.
