= List of forts in Karnataka =

In Karnataka there are thousands of forts, in Kannada called as ಕೋಟೆ (kōṭe) and ದುರ್ಗ (durga).

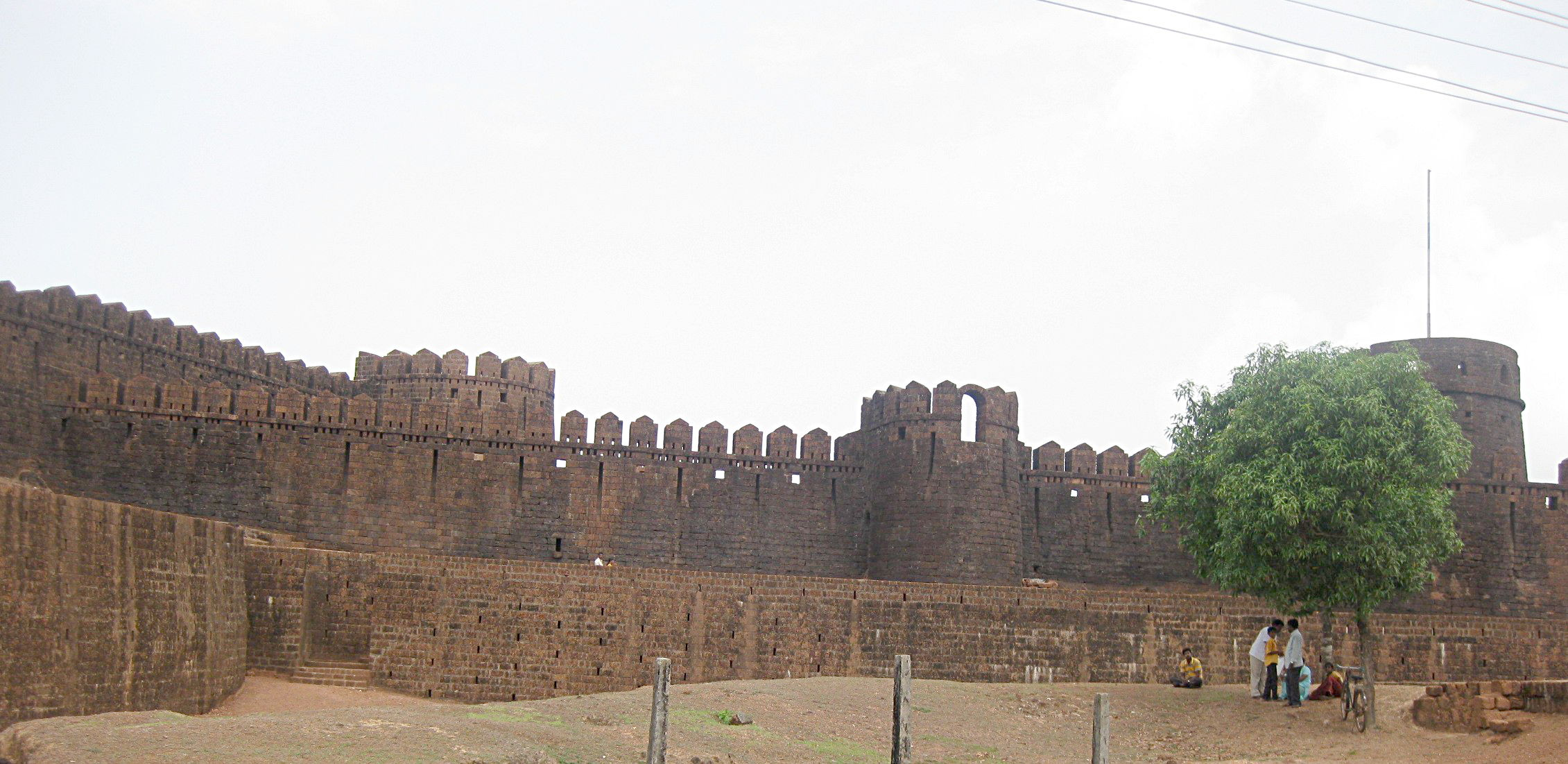
Mirjan Fort in Karkala South Karnataka

Forts of Karnataka.

== History of Forts of Karnataka ==
The Forts in Karnataka belong to various dynasties, some of them are more than a thousand years old.

== Famous Forts in Karnataka ==
- Basavakalyana Fort
- Bellary Fort
- Bidar Fort
- Chitradurga Fort
- Gajendragad Fort
- Gulbarga Fort
- Kittur Fort
- Manjarabad Fort
- Mirjan Fort
- Mudgal Fort
- Raichur Fort
- Savadatti (Saundatti) Fort

== List of Forts in Karnataka ==
Karnataka has a long history with forts. In 1294 A.D. the Raichur Fort, built during the reign of Kakatiyas of Warangal, played a major role in the history of Karnataka. The Krishna-Tungabhadra Doab region witnessed many battles fought to capture and control the fort, several battles involving Vijayanagar kings, Bahmanis and Adilshahis.

=== Bagalkot District ===
- Aihole Fort
- Badami Fort
- Bagalkot Fort

=== Belgaum District ===
- Kittur Fort
- Parasgad Fort
- Belgaum Fort
- Saundatti Fort
- Ramdurg Fort
- Bailhongal Fort
- Hooli Fort
- Gokak Fort
- Shirasangi Fort
- Bhimgad Fort
- Vallabhgad Fort
- Torgal Fort
- Manolli Fort

=== Bellary District ===
- Sanduru Fort
- Bellary Fort
- Tekkalakote Fort
- Malapanagudi Fort
- Kamalapura Fort
- Hampi Fort
- Kurugodu Fort
- Gudekote fort
- Kampli Fort
- Biralgudda fort
- Jermali Fort

=== Bengaluru Rural District ===
- Devanahalli Fort
- Makalidurga
- Kabbaldurga

=== Bengaluru urban District ===
- Bangalore Fort

=== Bidar District ===
- Bidar Fort
- Basavakalyana Fort
- Bhalki Fort
- Manyakheta Fort
- Bhatambra Fort
- Hankony Fort

=== Bijapur District ===
- Bijapur Fort
- talikote fort
- Kotnal Fort
- Halsangi Fort
- Nagabinal Fort
- Hiremural Fort
- Honahalli Fort

=== Chikkaballapura District ===
- Skandagiri
- Nandi Hill
- Gudibanda
- Gummanayakana Kote

=== Chikkamagaluru District ===
- Ballala Raayana Durga Fort

=== Chitradurga District ===
- Chitradurga Fort
- Hosadurga

=== Dakshina Kannada District ===
- Jamalabad Fort

=== Davanagere District ===
- Uchangidurga Fort
- Channagiri Fort

=== Gadag District ===
- Gajendrgad Fort
- Korlahalli Fort
- Hammigi Fort
- Hemagudda Fort
- Mundargi Fort
- Singatalur Fort
- Tippapura Fort
- Nargund Fort
- Magadi Fort, Gadag
- Shrimantgarh Fort, Devihal, Shirahatti

=== Gulbarga District ===
- Gulbarga Fort
- Sedam Fort
- Sonty Kullor Fort
- Malkhed Fort
- Ijeri Fort
- Chinmalla Fort
- Ferozabad Fort
- Modhul Manina Fort
- Chengta Fort
- Korwar Fort
- Martur Fort
- Alor B Fort
- Hollakonda Fort
- shahbad Fort
- Hovinhalli Fort
- Halkartti Fort

=== Hassan District ===
- Manjarabad Fort
- Nagapura Fort
- Shravanabelagola Fort
- Halebeedu Fort
- Beluru Fort
- Garudanagiri Fort

=== Haveri District ===
- Bankapura Fort
- Savanur Fort
- Havanur Fort
- Airani Fort

=== Kodagu District ===
- Madikeri Fort

=== Kolara District ===
- Ambajidurga
- Budikote

=== Koppal District ===
- Koppal Fort
- Anegundi Fort
- Kampli Fort
- Irakalgada
- Kammatadurga

=== Mandya District ===
- Melkote
- Srirangapatna

=== Raichur District ===
- Raichur Fort (also known as Giridurga)
- Mudgal Fort
- Malliabad Fort
- Jaladurga
- Kyadigera Fort
- Hungunta Fort

=== Ramanagara District ===
- Savandurga
- Magadi

=== Shivamogga District ===
- Kavaledurga Fort
- Thirthalli Fort
- Kodachadri
- Nagara Fort
- Kaanuru Fort

=== Tumkuru District ===
- Huthridurga
- Sira
- Huliyurdurga
- Pavagada
- Madhugiri
- Devarayanadurga
- Chennarayana Durga
- Shivagange
- Medigeshi
- Bhasmangi
- Nidagal Betta

=== Udupi District ===
- Barkur Fort
- Daria-Bahadurgad Fort
- Kapu Fort

=== Uttara Kannada District ===
- Mirjan Fort
- Sadashivgad Fort
- Asnoti
- Basavaraja Fort
- Sanmudageri

=== Yadagiri District ===
- Vanadurga Fort
- Wagingera Fort
- Shapur Fort
- Yadagiri Fort
- Gurumatkal Fort
- Chandarki Fort
- Surpur Fort

=== Kolar District ===
- Tekal Fort
- Paparajanahalli Fort
- Avani Fort
- Mulbagal Fort
- Virupakshi Fort
- Kurudumale Fort
- Budikote Fort

== See also ==
- Karnataka
- North Karnataka
