= Tippapura =

Village in Karnataka, India

Tippapura Thippapura
- Village
- Location within Karnataka Location within India
- Coordinates: 15°9′32″N 75°51′0″E
- Country: India
- State: Karnataka
- District: Gadag district
- Taluk: Mundargi
- Lok Sabha Constituency: Koppal

Languages
  - Official: Kannada
- Time zone: UTC+5:30 (IST)
- Vehicle registration: KA 26

Tippapura also spelled as Thippapura, is a village in the Mundargi taluk of Gadag district in the Indian state of Karnataka. Tippapura is located south to district headquarters Gadag and Taluka headquarters Mundargi.

== Climate ==
The climate here is considered to be a local steppe climate. In Tippapura, there is little rainfall throughout the year. The climate here is classified as BSh by the Köppen-Geiger system. The average annual temperature is 25.6 °C in Tippapura. Precipitation here averages 496 mm.

== See also ==
- Singatalur
- Hammigi
- Korlahalli
- Mundargi
- Gadag
- Koppal
