= Raichur Fort =

- Raichur, India
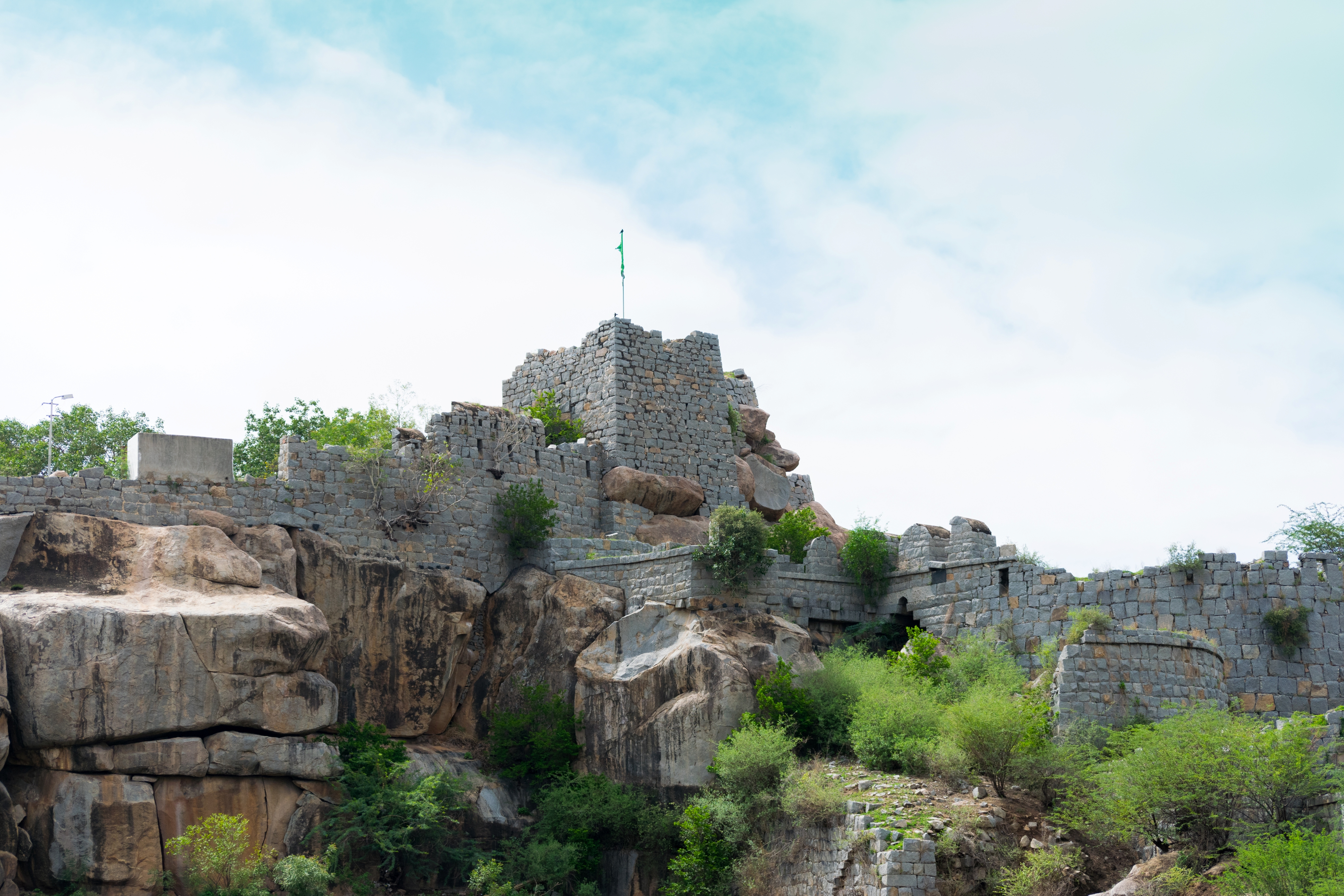
- Raichur Fort

Site information
- Type: Fort
- Controlled by: Government of Karnataka
- Open to the public: Yes
- Condition: Ruins

Location
- Location within Karnataka
- Coordinates: 16.19°N 77.34°E

Site history
- Built: 1294; 732 years ago
- Built by: Kakatiya dynasty

Raichur Fort is a fortress located on a hilltop in the heart of the Raichur in North Karnataka.

The Raichur region (Raichur Doab) has been ruled by several families; the Kakatiya dynasty, Rashtrakutas, Vijayanagar Empire, Bahmanis and Nizams.

== History ==
Fortifications have existed since the time of the Chalukyas of Badami; during the rule of Chalukyas of Kalyani the fort was renovated. The present fort was constructed in 1294 CE during Kakatiya rule. An inscription records that it was built by Raja Vithala on the order of Raja Gona Gannaya Reddivaru, minister of Queen Rudramma Devi.

The fort was of strategic importance to the Bahmani Sultanate, who significantly expanded the structure.

During the rule of Vijayanagara Empire, Krishnadevaraya built the north entrance in celebration of one of his conquests.

Later it was also used by Gadwal Samasthanam, they ruled most of the modern-day Raichur at their peak.

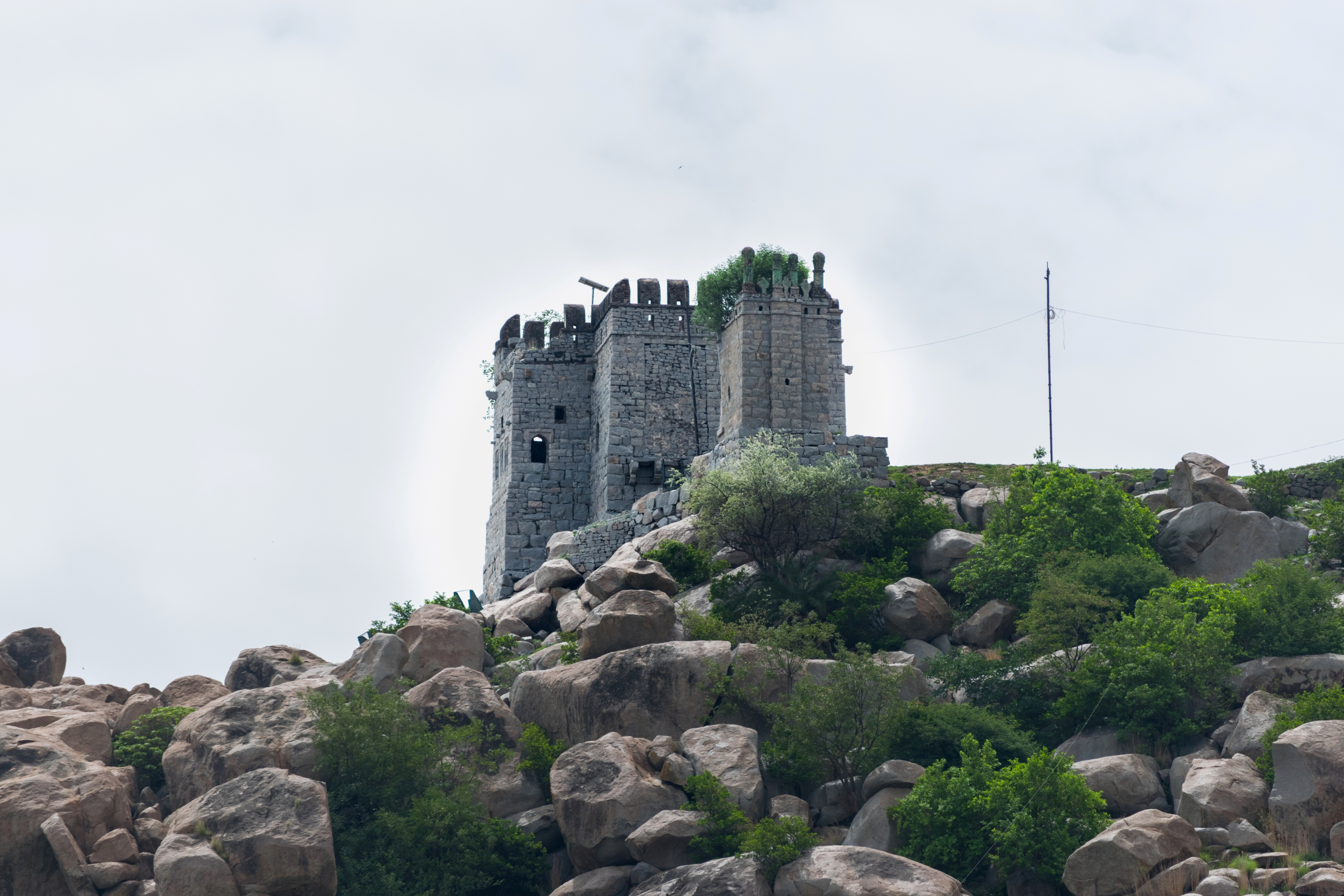
Raichur fort

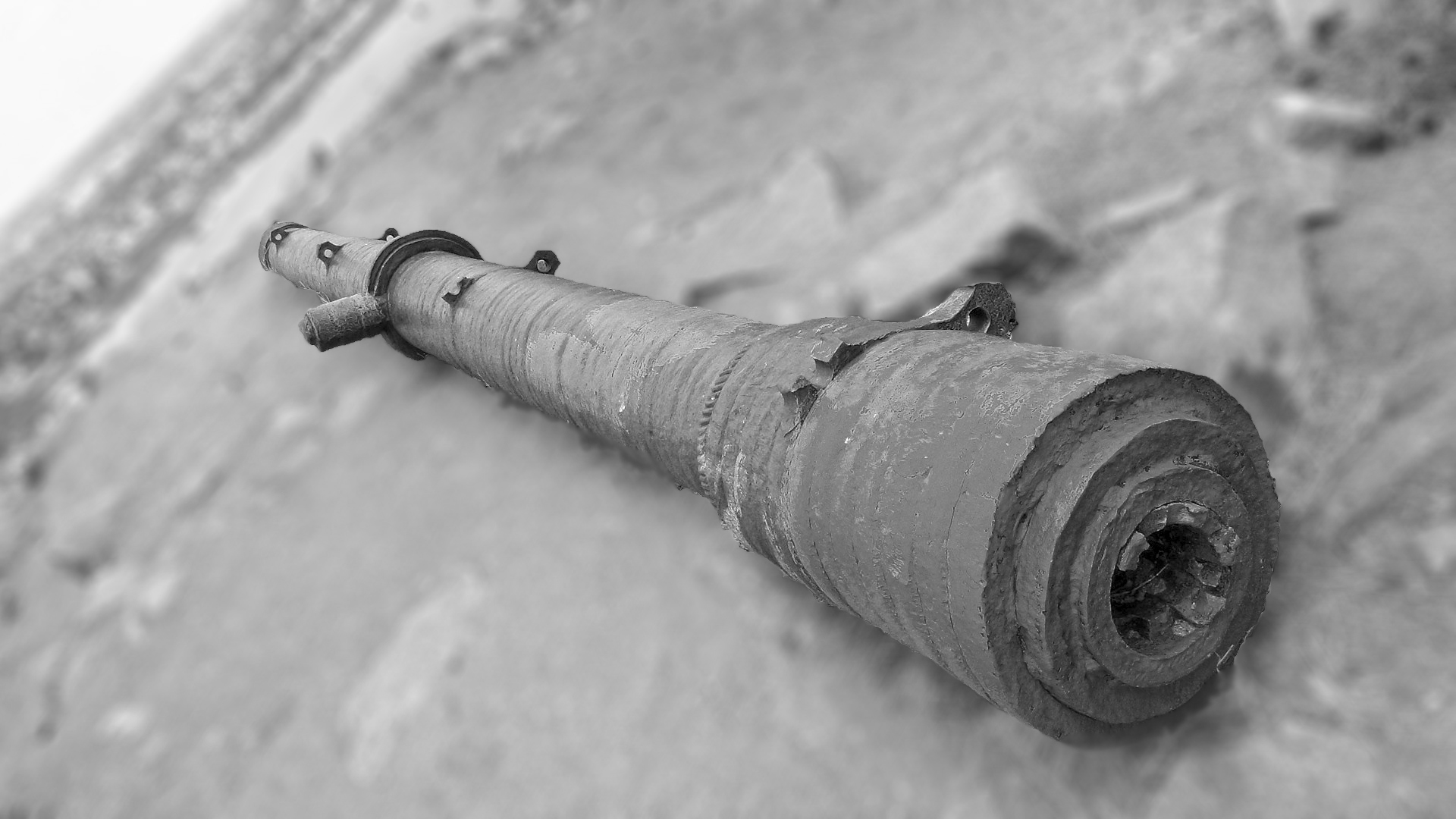
Iron Cannon

The fort is known for its many inscriptions, in several languages.

In March 2011, 95 red granite balls and a cannon dated to the 13th Century were discovered by engineers cleaning the north west wall of the fort.

== See also ==
- Malliabad Fort
- Jaladurga
- Mudgal Fort
- Vijayanagar Empire
- Chalukyas
- Kakatiyas
- Musunuri Nayaks
- Raichur
- Forts of Karnataka
- North Karnataka
