= Venkateswara Temple (disambiguation) =

Venkateswara Temple is a temple in Tirumala, Chittoor district, Andhra Pradesh.

Venkateswara Temple may also refer to:

== India ==
- Venkateswara Temple, Dwaraka Tirumala, Andhra Pradesh, India
- Venkateswara Temple, Ramenahalli, a temple in Gadag district, Karnataka
- Venkateswara Temple, Tenali, a temple in Guntur district, Andhra Pradesh
- Venkateswara Temple, Eklaspur, a temple in Mahabubnagar district, Telangana
- Sri Venkateswara Swamy Temple, Visakhapatnam, a temple in Vizag

== Other countries ==
- Sri Venkateswara Temple, a temple in Helensburgh, New South wales, Australia
