= Hirewaddatti =

- village
- Country: India
- State: Karnataka
- District: Gadag
- Talukas: Mundargi

Government
  - Body: Gram panchayat

Population (2001)
  - Total: 6,529

Languages
  - Official: Kannada
- Time zone: UTC+5:30 (IST)
- ISO 3166 code: IN-KA
- Vehicle registration: KA
- Website: karnataka.gov.in

Hirewaddatti is a village in the southern state of Karnataka, India. It is located in the Mundargi taluk of Gadag district in Karnataka.

== Demographics ==
As of 2001 India census, Hirewaddatti had a population of 6529 with 3304 males and 3225 females.

== See also ==
- Gadag
- Districts of Karnataka
