= Singatalur =

Singatalur Shingatalur
- Village
- Location within Karnataka Location within India
- Coordinates: 15°4′12″N 75°53′9″E
- Country: India
- State: Karnataka
- District: Gadag district
- Taluk: Mundargi
- Lok Sabha Constituency: Koppal

Languages
  - Official: Kannada
- Time zone: UTC+5:30 (IST)
- Vehicle registration: KA 26

Singatalur is a village in the Mundargi taluk of Gadag district in the Indian state of Karnataka. Singatalur is located south to district headquarters Gadag and Taluka headquarters Mundargi.

== Demographics ==
Per the 2011 Census of India, has a total population of 3069; of whom 1577 are male and 1492 female.

== Singatalur lift irrigation project ==
Singatalur Lift Irrigation Project on Tungabhadra river is aimed to irrigate 8,000 acres (3,200 ha).

== See also ==
- Hammigi
- Korlahalli
- Mundargi
- Gadag
- Koppal
- Siranahalli
- Gangapur
- Kombali
