= Meundi =

Mewundi
- Village
- Location within Karnataka Location within India
- Coordinates: 15°16′10″N 75°49′57″E
- Country: India
- State: Karnataka
- District: Gadag district

Languages
- Time zone: UTC+5:30 (IST)

Mewundi is a village in the Mundaragi tehsil of Gadag district in Karnataka state, India. It is a situated few kilometres from NH-63 on the state highway from Gadag to Mundaragi.

== Demographics ==
It has a population of around 3,000 with 500 houses.

A gas-based power plant of 2,000 MW is proposed at this place.

== Economy ==
The economy of the town depends on the growth of cotton crops.
