= Gulbarga Fort =

Bahmani-era fort in Kalaburagi, India

- Kalaburagi, India
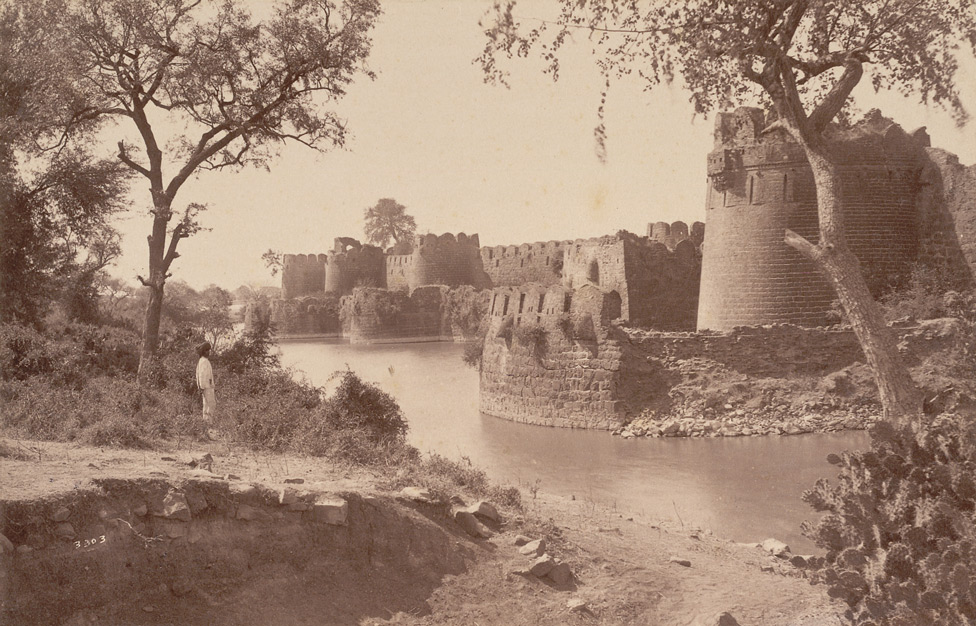
- Gulbarga Fort

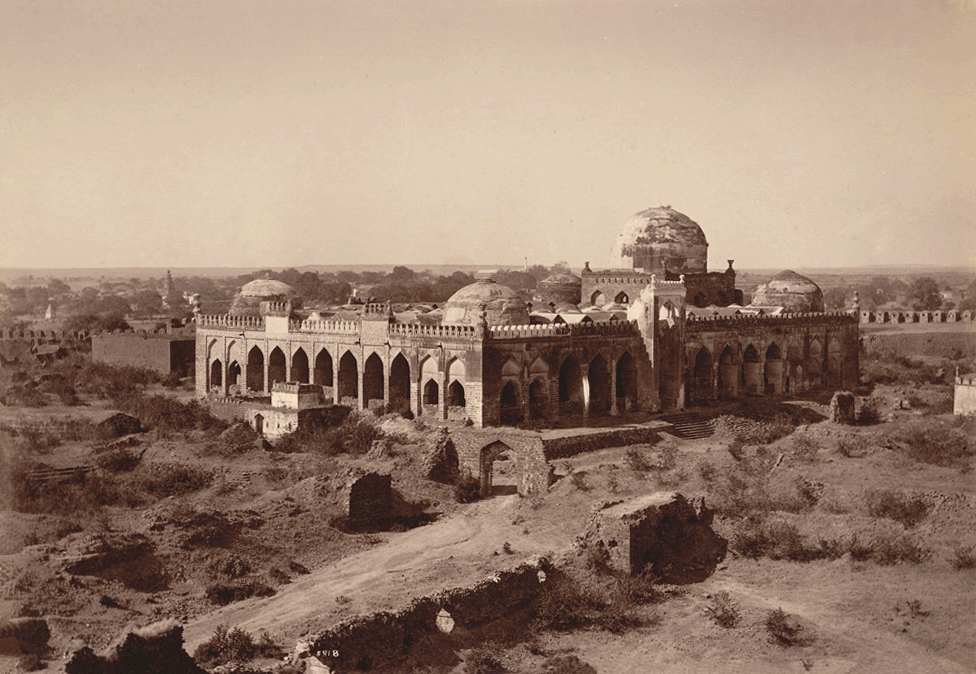
- Great Mosque (Jami Masjid) in Gulbarga Fort

Site information
- Type: Fortress
- Controlled by: Government of Karnataka
- Open to the public: Yes
- Condition: Ruins

Location
- Coordinates: 17.3405°N 76.8311°E

Site history
- Built: 14th century
- Built by: Sultan Al-ud-din Bahmani of Bahmani Sultanate in 1327 and Adil Shah
- Materials: Basalt, Granites and lime mortar

The Gulbarga Fort is located in Kalaburagi in the Kalaburagi district of North Karnataka. The fort was originally constructed by the Hindu monarch Raja Gulchand, and it was subsequently significantly enlarged in 1347 by Ala-ud-Din Bahman Shah of the Bahmani Kingdom after he cut off his ties with the Delhi Sultanate. Islamic monuments such as mosques, palaces, tombs, and other structures were also built later within the refurbished fort. The Jama Masjid, built later within the fort in 1367, is a unique structure built in the Persian architectural style, fully enclosed with elegant domes and arched columns. It was built to commemorate the establishment of the dynastic rule of the Bahmani Kingdom at Gulbarga Fort between 1347 and 1424. It remained the capital of the Bahmani Kingdom until 1424 where after the capital was shifted to Bidar, which had better climatic conditions.

== History ==
The early history of the region dates back to the 6th century when the Rashtrakutas ruled over the external areas, except Gulbarga. The Chalukyas won back their domain and ruled for over two hundred years. The Kalachuris of Kalyani succeeded them and ruled until the 12th century. At the end of the 12th century, it came under the rule of the Yadavas of Devagiri and the Hoysalas of Halebid. During this period, the Kakatiya dynasty, kings of Warangal, were also powerful and took control of the present-day Kalaburagi district and Raichur district.

The Kakatiya power was subdued in 1321, and the northern Deccan, including the district of Gulbarga, passed under the control of the Delhi Sultanate.

In the early 14th century, the Deccan was under the rule of Muhammad bin Tughluq of the Delhi Sultanate, whose dominions included Gulbarga. The revolt of the Muslim officers appointed from Delhi resulted in the founding of the Bahmani Sultanate in 1347 by Zafar Khan, who eventually chose Gulbarga (named as 'Ahsenabad' during this period) to be his capital. Gulbarga was the capital of the Bahmani Kingdom (with headquarters at the Gulbarga Fort) until 1424, when the capital was transferred to Bidar. It is said that with the establishment of the Bahmani Kingdom, the Muslim rule took firm roots in the Deccan. Bahmani sultan Ahmad Shah I Wali had inducted immigrants from Iraq, Iran and Central Asia, which changed the social, cultural and religious life in the Deccan but was well amalgamated with Hindu traditions.

The fort was razed to the ground by the Vijayanagara Empire, but was subsequently rebuilt by Yusuf Adil Shah of the Sultanate of Bijapur after Vijayanagara was defeated in 1565 in the Battle of Talikota.

The Mughal Emperor Aurangzeb (r. 1658–1707) captured the fort in 1687 and appointed Asaf Jah I ("Nizam-ul-Mulk") as the governor of the Deccan. In 1724, when the Mughal Empire was declining, the Nizam became independent and formed the Hyderabad State, of which Gulbarga area was a part.

The fort and the Gulbarga district were a part of Hyderabad State under the Nizam's rule. After India became independent in August 1947, Hyderabad State was annexed to the Dominion of India in 1948. In 1956, the Indian state of Hyderabad was partitioned among neighbouring states along linguistic lines and renamed as Andhra Pradesh (now Telangana). Most of the Gulbarga district became part of the then Mysore State, later renamed Karnataka, excluding two taluks, which were given to Andhra Pradesh.

== Inscription ==
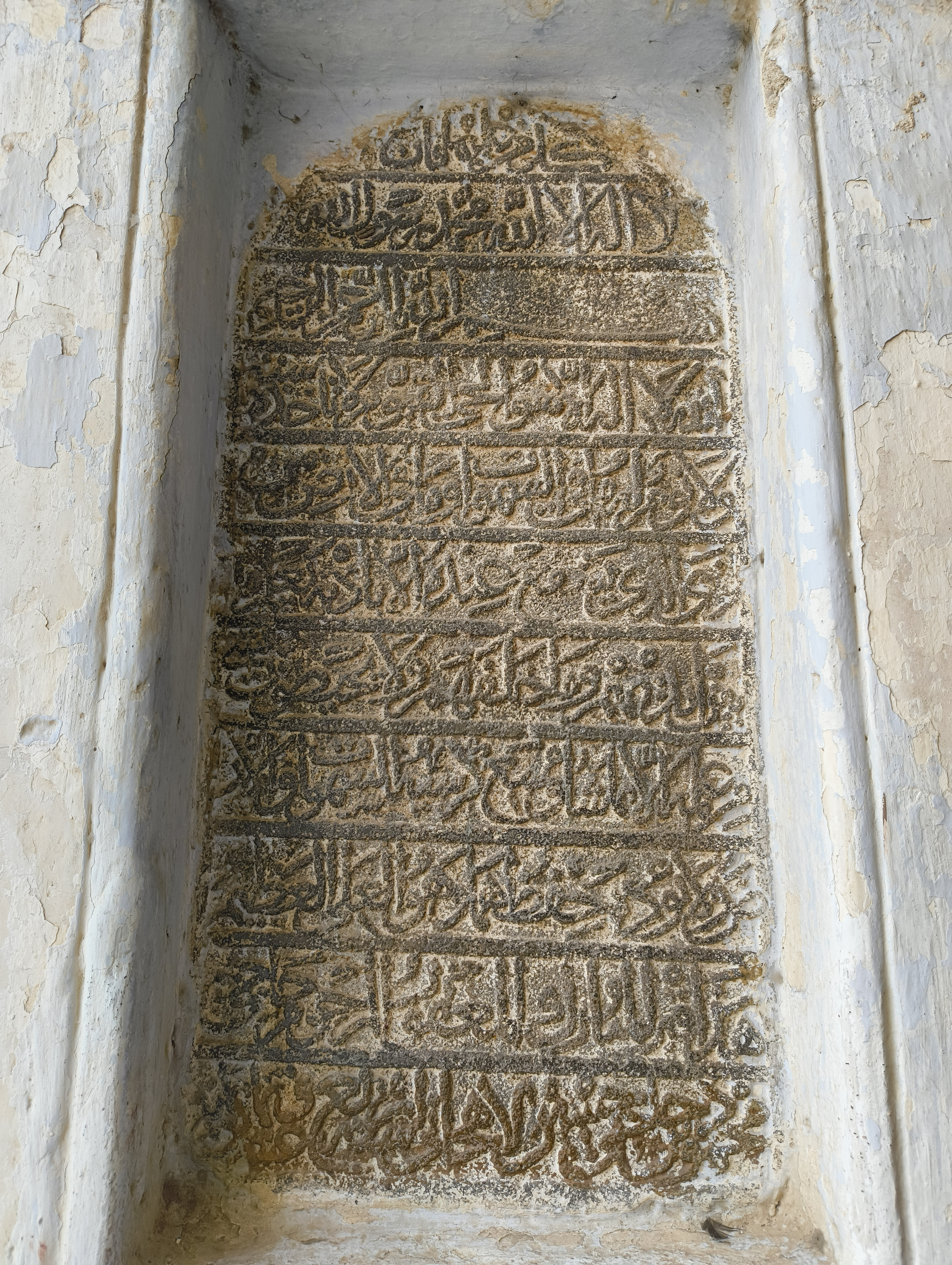
Inscription on left side of wall

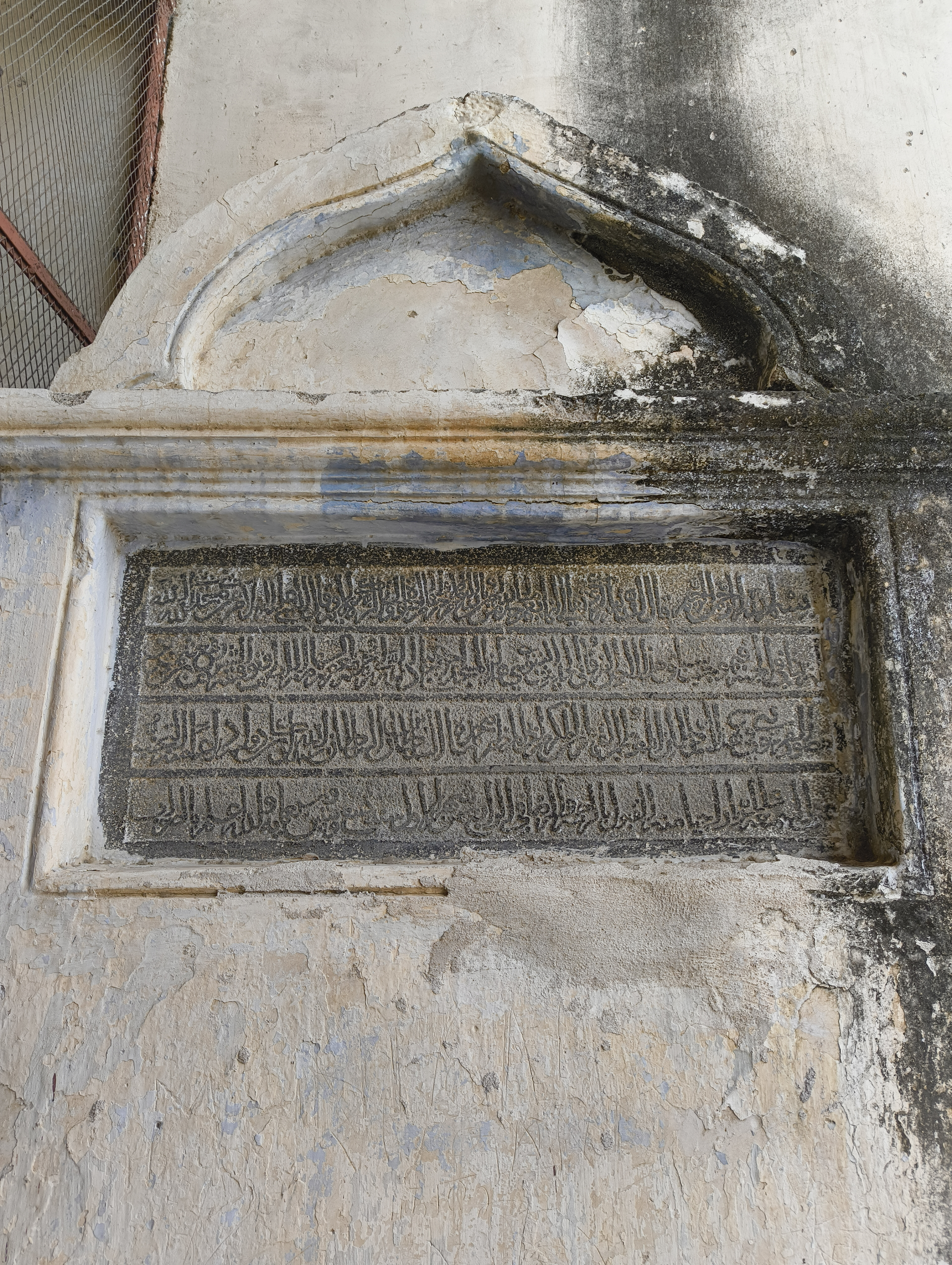
Inscription on right side of wall

Upon entering the Jamia Masjid, inscriptions in Deccani Persian language are found on the left and right walls of the main entrance.

== Geography ==
It is located on a plateau land in the northeastern part of Karnataka. Krishna River and Bhima River drain the district. The soil formation in the region is predominantly of black cotton soil.

Fort is in the drought prone district and experiences a meagre average rainfall of 777 millimetres (30.6 in) with only 46 normal rainy days.

Climate is dry and cold in the winter but summer is hot. South west monsoon brings rains. Temperature during summer is a high of 45 °C (113 °F), the minimum recorded in winter is 5 °C (41 °F).

== Structures ==
With the establishment of the Bahmani Kingdom in the Deccan from 1347, the architectural styles of Persia made impressive and lasting impacts, which are seen in the fort. The mosques, arches, gardens, and the palaces were built within and also outside the fort in the Kalaburagi town. Within the fort, the buildings built are impressive with Indo-Persian architecture that evolved in the Deccan. Professor Desai has observed:

A distinct Indo-Persian architectural style of Deccan came into existence after the establishment of the Bahmani dynasty in 1347.

Some of the important structures built are elaborated.

=== Fort ===
The fort was originally built by and was subsequently substantially fortified in West Asian and European military architectural style by Alauddin Hasan Bahman Shah, the founder and first Sultan of the Bahmani Empire; particular mention is made of the citadel that was added in the centre of the fort. The fort has an area of approximately 57 acres (23 ha) and periphery length of 3 kilometres (1.9 mi). It is well fortified with double fortification. A 30 feet (9.1 m) wide moat surrounds the fort. The fort is a monumental structure highly fortified with 15 towers mounted with 26 guns; each gun located inside the fort is 8 metres (26 ft) long and is still well preserved.

It is said that the Bahmani Sultanate claimed lineage of the Sasanians and the motifs on their buildings, particularly the crowns of the arches that they built depicted an emblem of the crescent and occasionally a disk that was closely reminiscent of the crowns of the Sassanian emperors. Many religious or secular buildings in the fort area depict this emblem.

=== Jamia Masjid ===
The Jamia Mosque, one of the first in South India, was built to commemorate Gulbarga as the capital of the Bahmani Sultanate. The mosque though simple in design but has a symmetrical plan with well organized constituent parts. The masjid, only one of its kind in India, has dimensions of 216 feet (66 m)x176 feet (54 m) and was built on the lines of the Great Mosque of Córdoba in Spain. The masjid, which was in ruins, has been well tended now.

The mosque has no open courtyard. The outer passageways surround the prayer hall on three sides and have low open arcades with arches. They form a rectangular layout with ten bays each on the north and the south, and seven bays on the east. The square bays on the corners are topped by domes. The roofed interior bays are covered with low domes, faceted by pendentives. The front yard in front of the mihrab has nine bays with a single large dome. Trefoil interiors and elongated lobes are seen on sloping arches of the drum. The main roof drum is mounted on a cubic clerestory. The wooden screens that existed on the outer arcade openings have been removed over the years. They have been replaced, in recent times, by an arched entrance portal on the north face. On the whole, the mosque displays distinct Persian architectural style with five large domes (One large and four small at the corners) and 75 small domes with 250 arches.

=== Tomb of Bande Nawaz ===
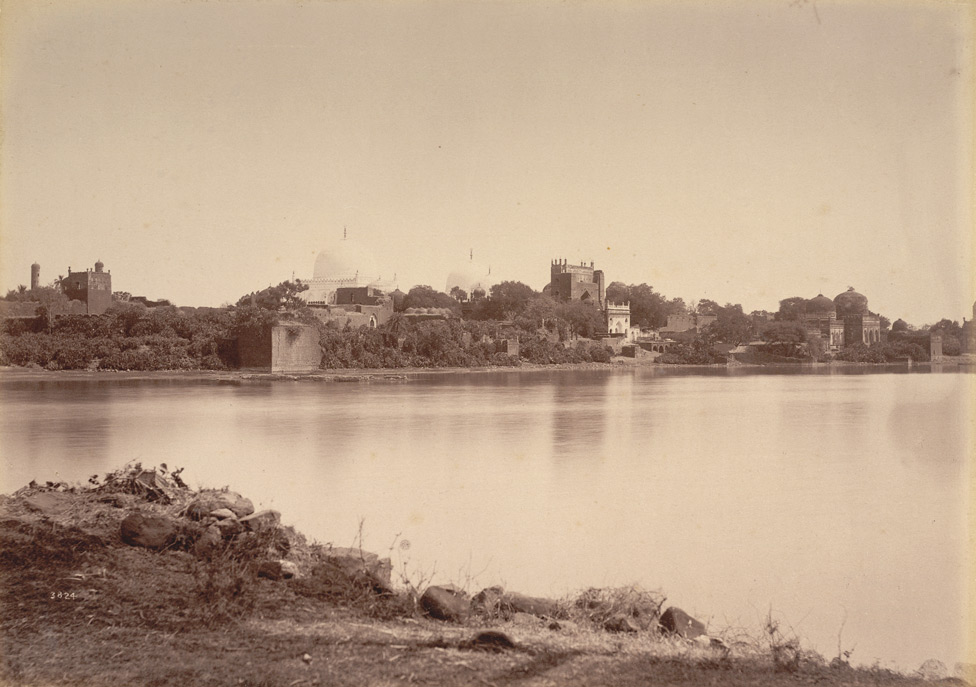
Dargah of Bande Nawaz

Apart from the other monuments, the other building of interest is the tomb of the Sufi saint Bande Nawaz, built in the Indo-Saracenic style. It is a large complex where the tomb of the Sufi saint exists. The tomb walls have paintings; the arches of the dargah are in the Bahmani architectural style while the paintings on the walls and ceiling have a fusion of Turkish and Persian influence. The Mughals also built a mosque close to the tomb. An annual fair or Urs is held here in November, which attracts a large number of devotees of all religious communities.

== Access ==
Kalaburagi is well connected by air, railway lines and roads. It is an important rail head on the Central Railway zone line connecting to Bengaluru, Mumbai, Chennai and Hyderabad.

It is well connected by National Highways with Bengaluru and Hyderabad, which are 610 kilometres (380 mi) and 225 kilometres (140 mi) away respectively, from Kalaburagi. Road distances to other cities within the state are: Basavakalyan-80 kilometres (50 mi), Bidar -120 kilometres (75 mi), Raichur - 155 kilometres (96 mi) and Bijapur - 160 kilometres (99 mi).

Kalaburagi Airport is the nearest airport.

== Gallery ==
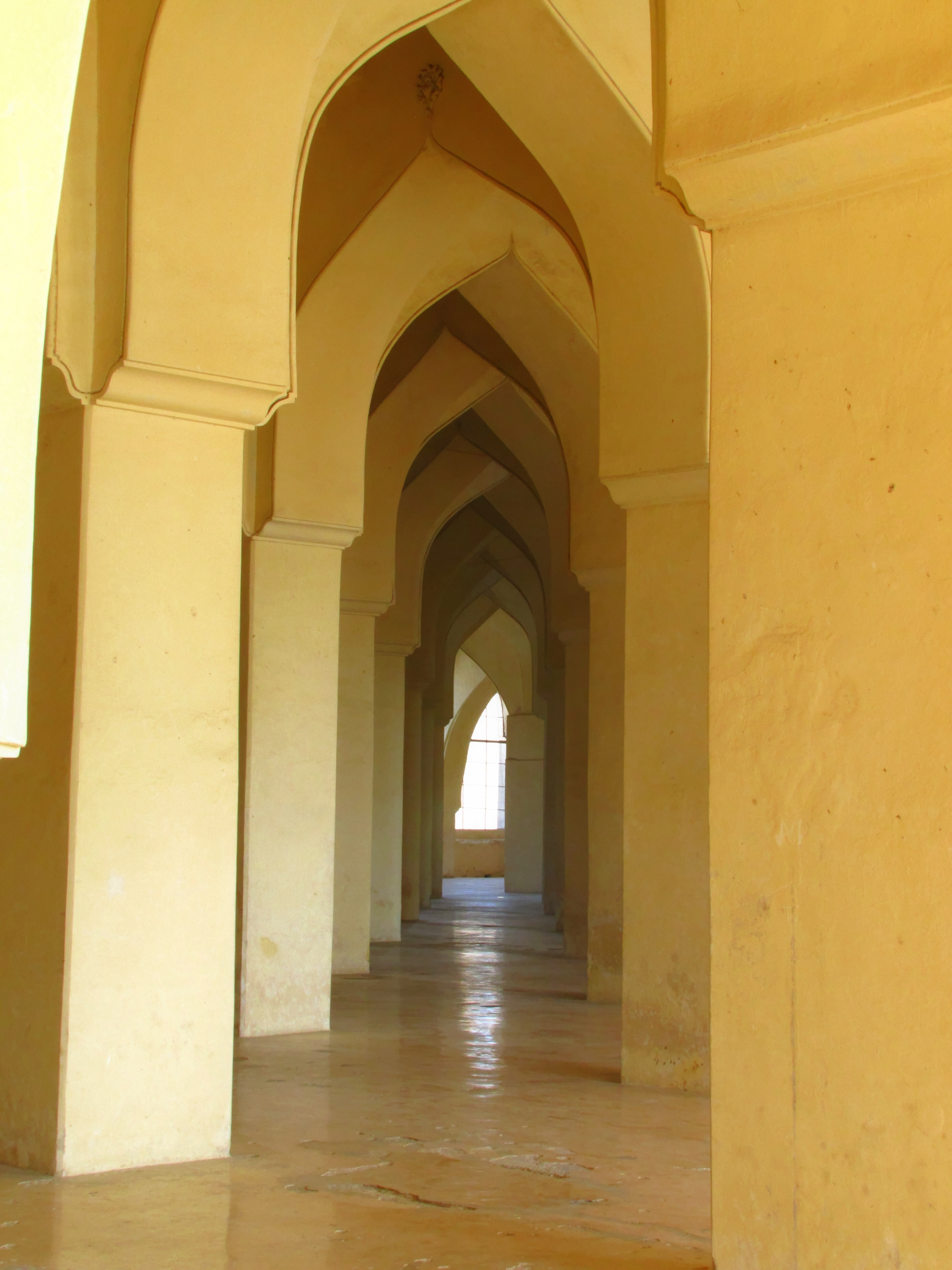
Arches Inside the Jama Mosque

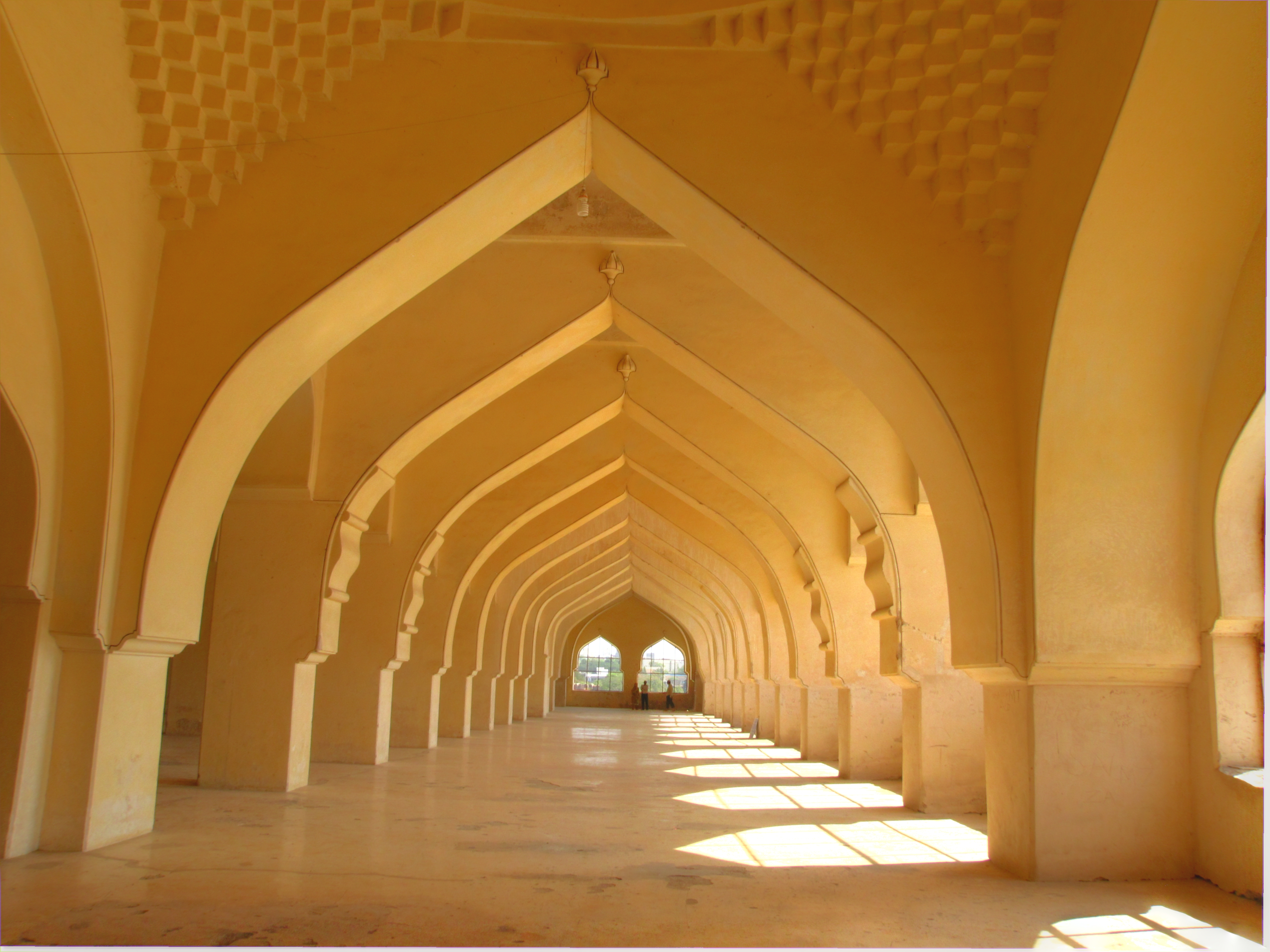
Arches Inside the Jama Mosque

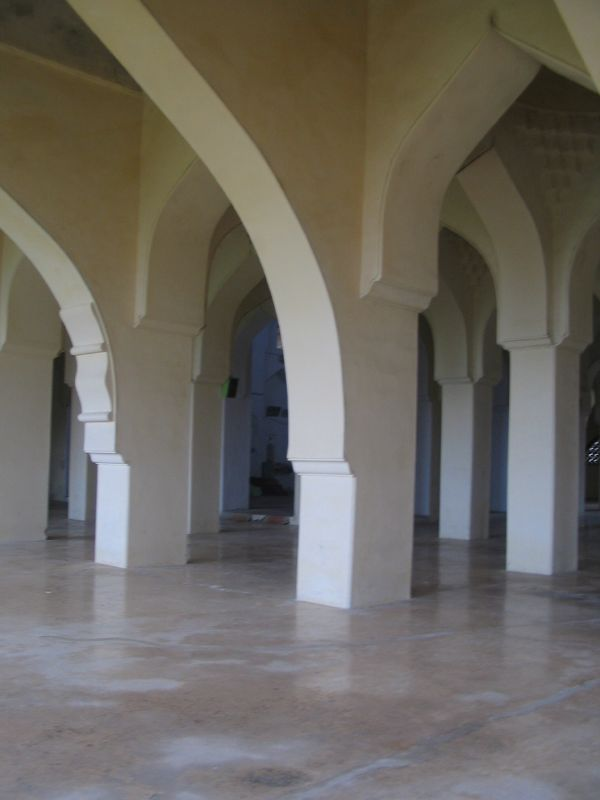
Jama Masjid interior

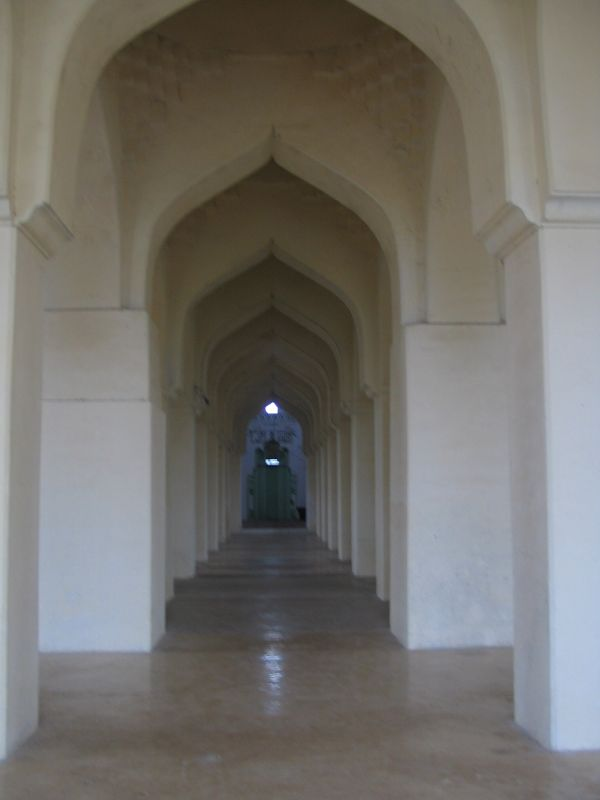
Long interior architectural view of the Jama Masjid

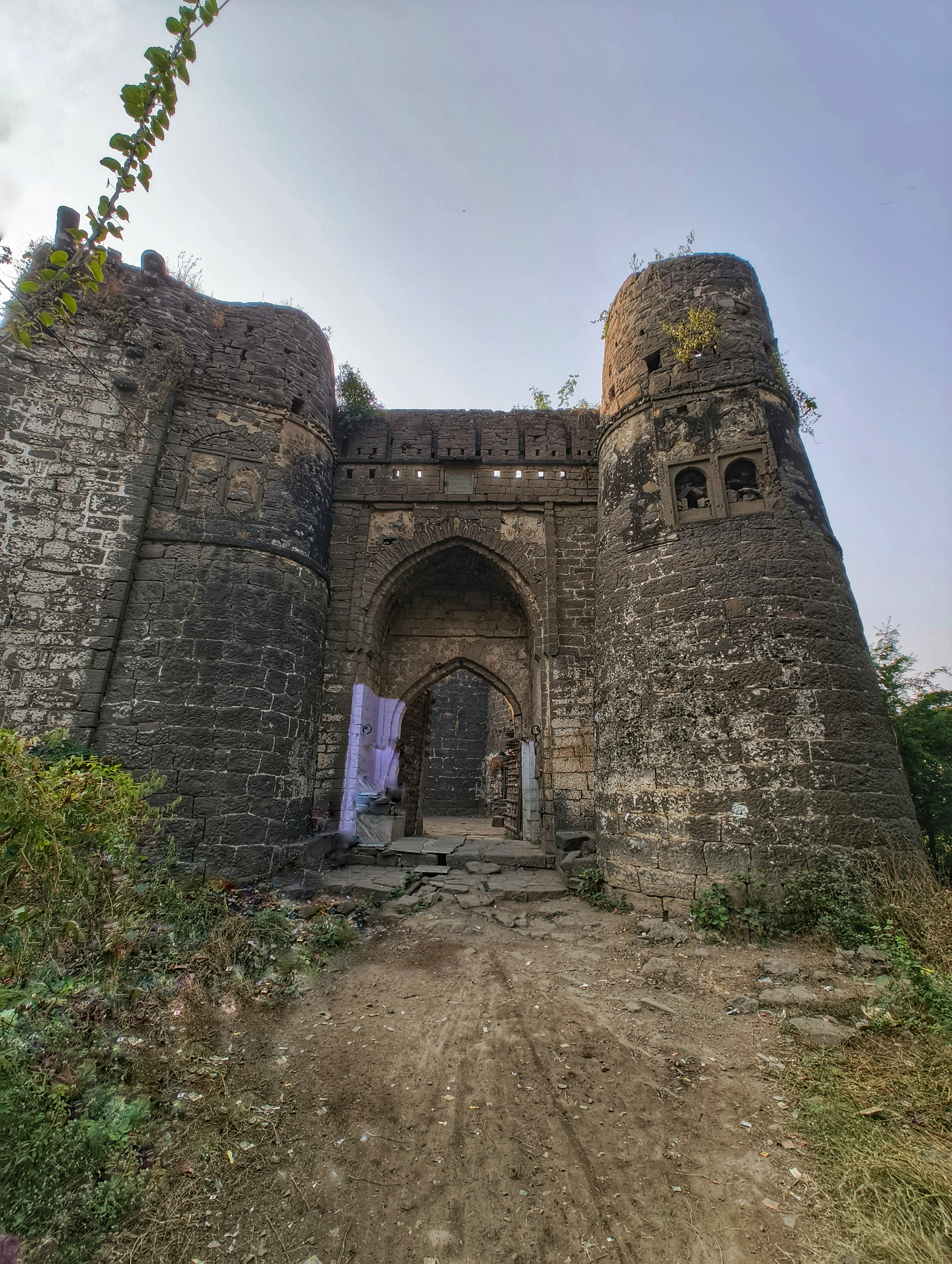
North Door-I of Gulbarga fort

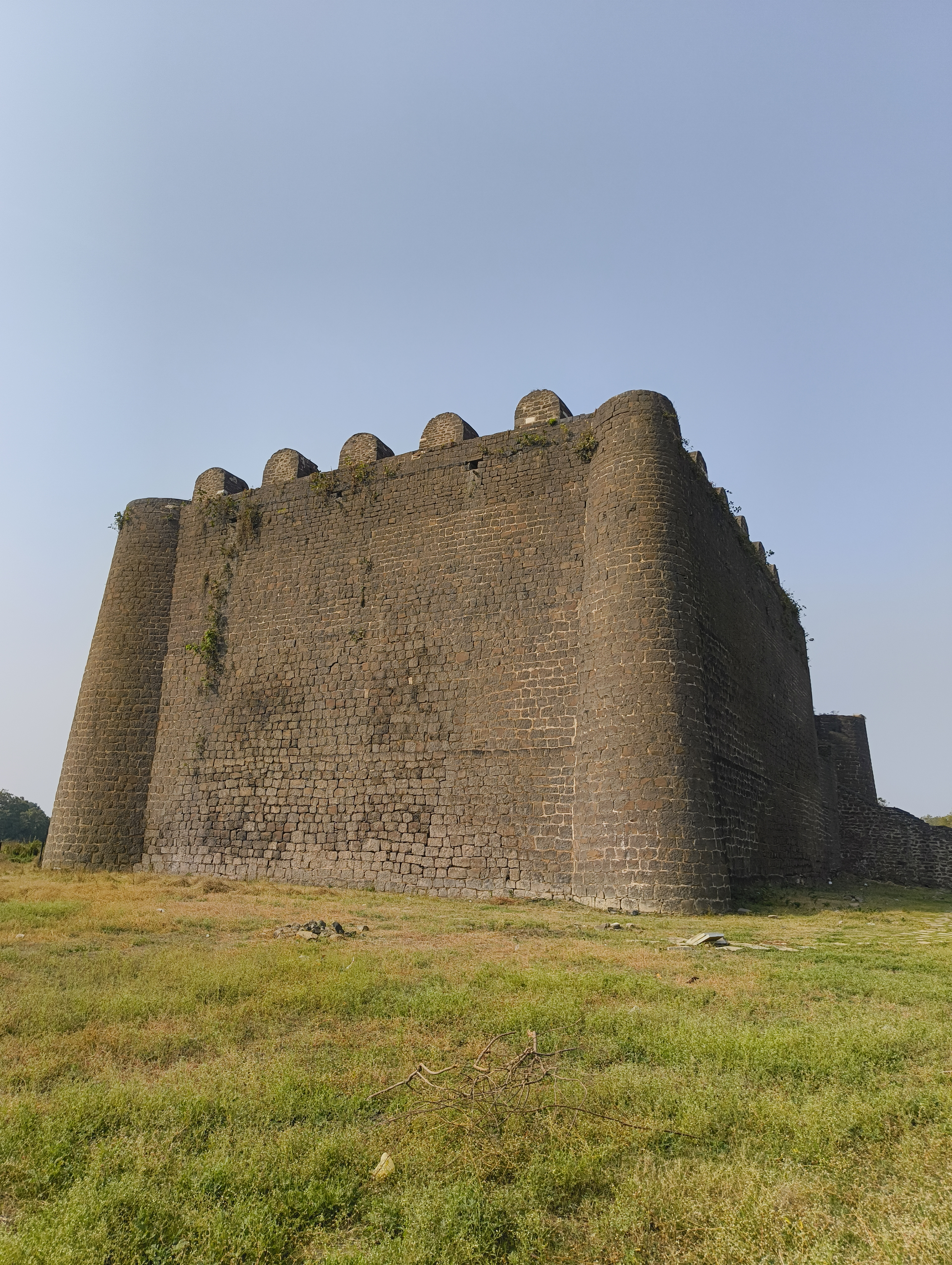
Balahisar bastion for placing cannons

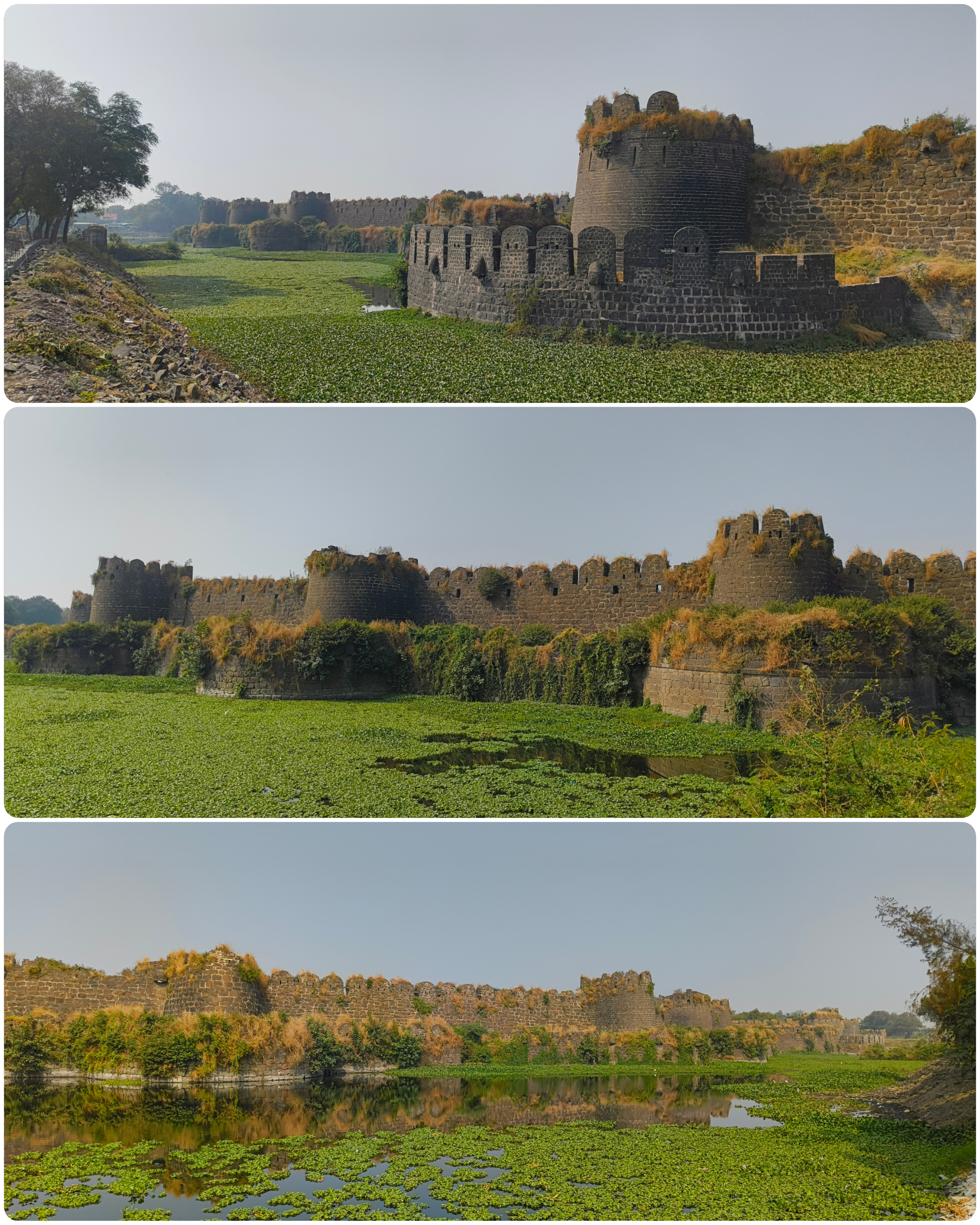
Double Fortification & Moat of Gulbarga fort

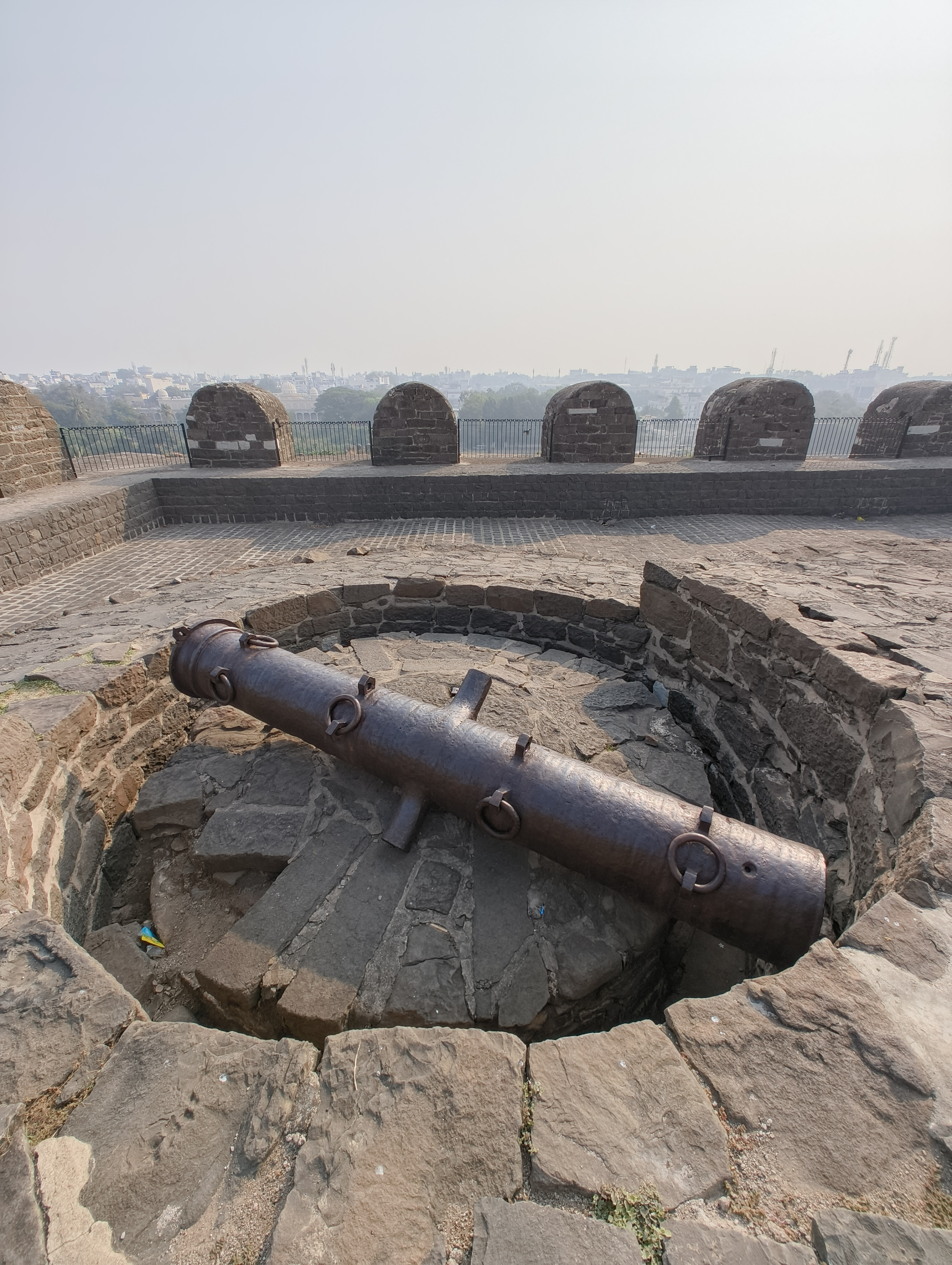
Cannon-I at Balahisar

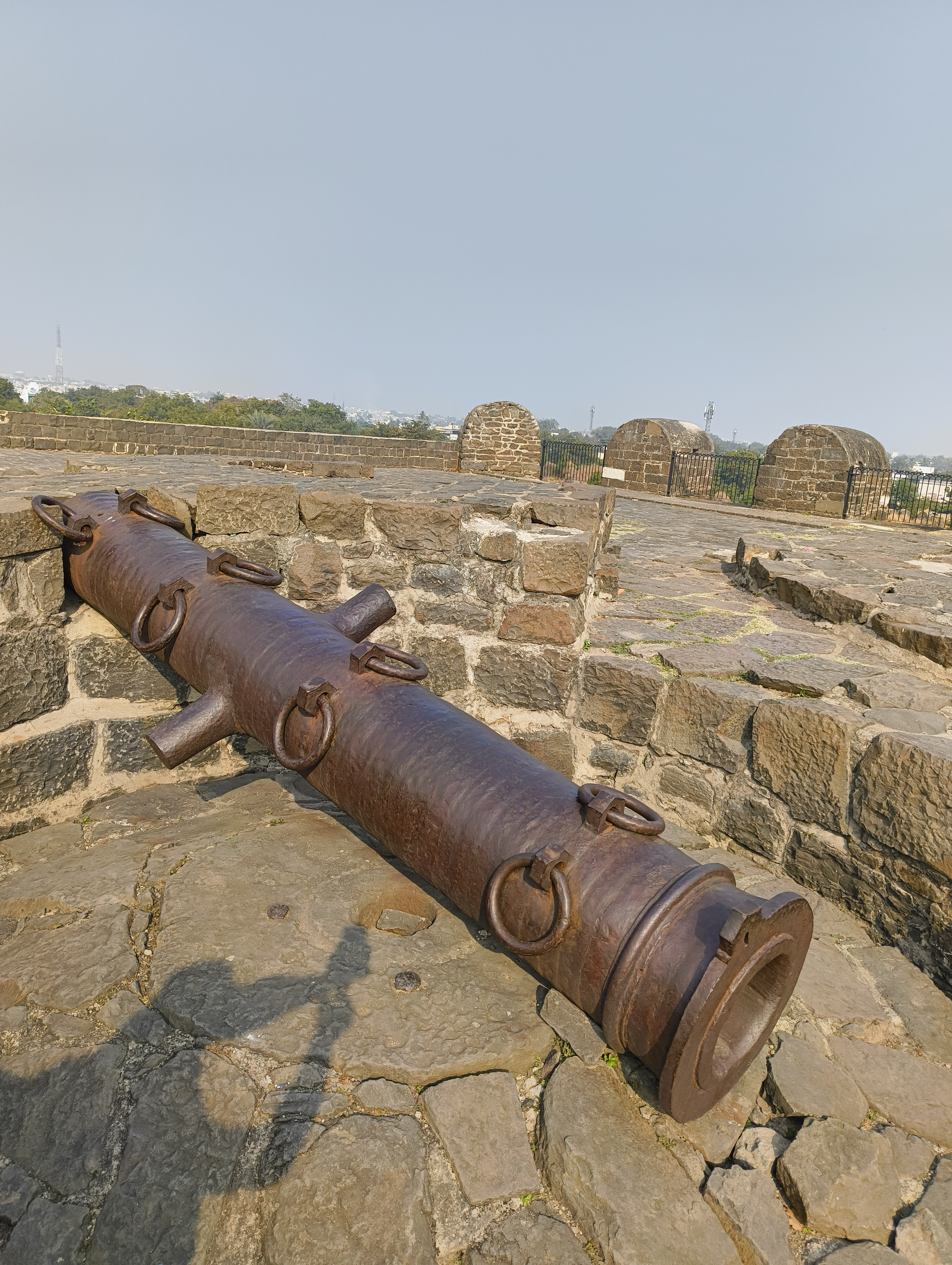
Cannon-II at Balahisar

== See also ==
- Haft Gumbaz
- Sharana Basaveshwara Temple
- List of forts in Karnataka
