= Jama Mosque, Kalaburagi =

Mosque in Kalaburagi, Karnataka, India

Jama Masjid
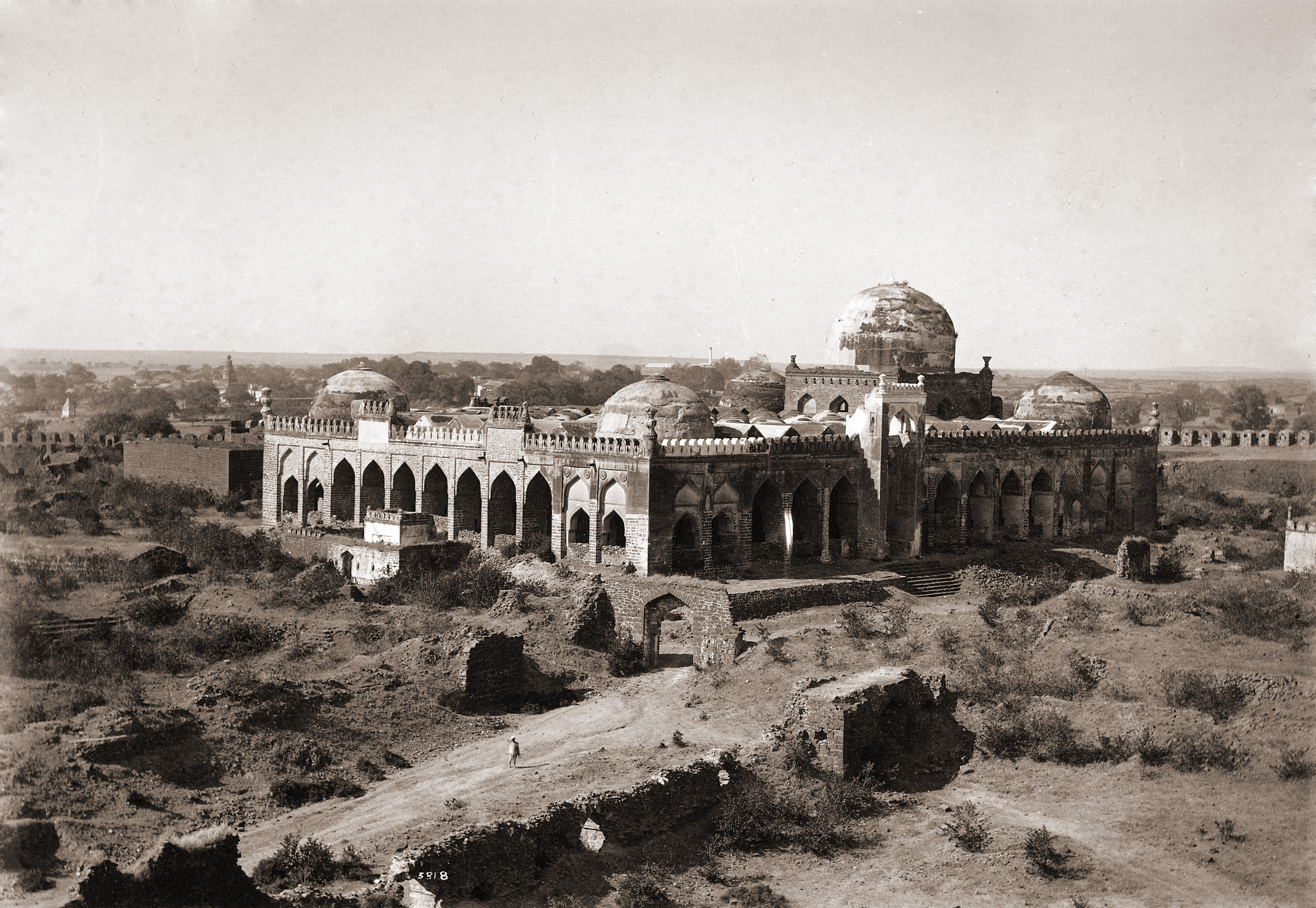
- The mosque, in 1880

- Location of the mosque in Karnataka

Religion
- Affiliation: Islam
- Ecclesiastical or organisational status: Mosque
- Status: Active

Location
- Location: Gulbarga Fort, Kalaburagi (formerly known as Gulbarga), Karnataka
- Country: India
- Coordinates: 17°20′26″N 76°49′52″E

Architecture
- Type: Mosque architecture
- Style: Bahmani
- Completed: 1367 CE

Specifications
- Capacity: 2,000 worshippers
- Length: 66 m (216 ft)
- Width: 54 m (177 ft)
- Dome: 67 (estimate)
- Materials: Lime bricks

The Jama Masjid, also known as the Friday Mosque of Gulbarga, the Great Mosque of Gulbarga Fort, and formally as the Jamia Masjid - Qila-e-Hasham, is a Friday mosque located in Kalaburagi (formerly known as Gulbarga), in the state of Karnataka, India. The mosque is located within the Gulbarga Fort complex, in Kalaburagi.

In 2014, UNESCO placed the building on its "tentative list" to become a World Heritage Site, under the name Monuments and Forts of the Deccan Sultanate. (Note: The singular use of "Sultanate" by UNESCO implies the existence of just one Sultanate. However, there were a number of different Sultanates.)

== History ==
The mosque was built in 1367 by Bahmani Sultan Mohammed Shah I to commemorate the establishment of the capital in Gulbarga following the defeat Kapaya Nayaka of Warangal. The mosque was designed by a Persian architect, Rafi, and built within the Kalaburagi Fort complex. It is one of the earliest Friday mosques in South India.

== Architecture ==
The Kalaburagi Friday Mosque is notable for its divergence from typical mosque architecture of the time. The basic layout is similar to that of a courtyard mosque, except that the central courtyard is covered by sixty-three small domes. The mosque also lacks minarets, instead having four larger domes at each corner of the mosque. Three of the four outer walls are also open to sunlight, while the qibla is solid.

== Gallery ==
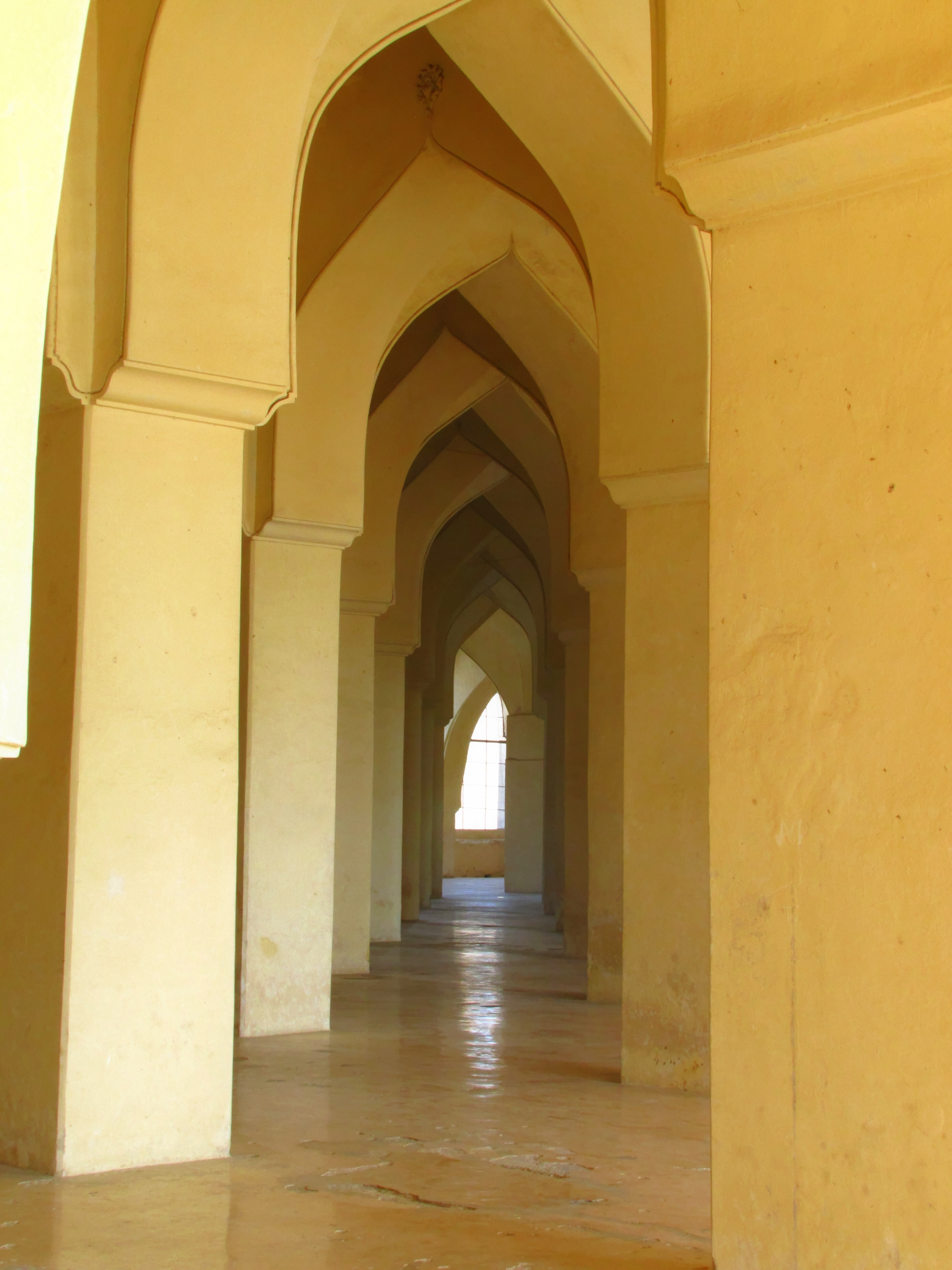
Arches inside the mosque

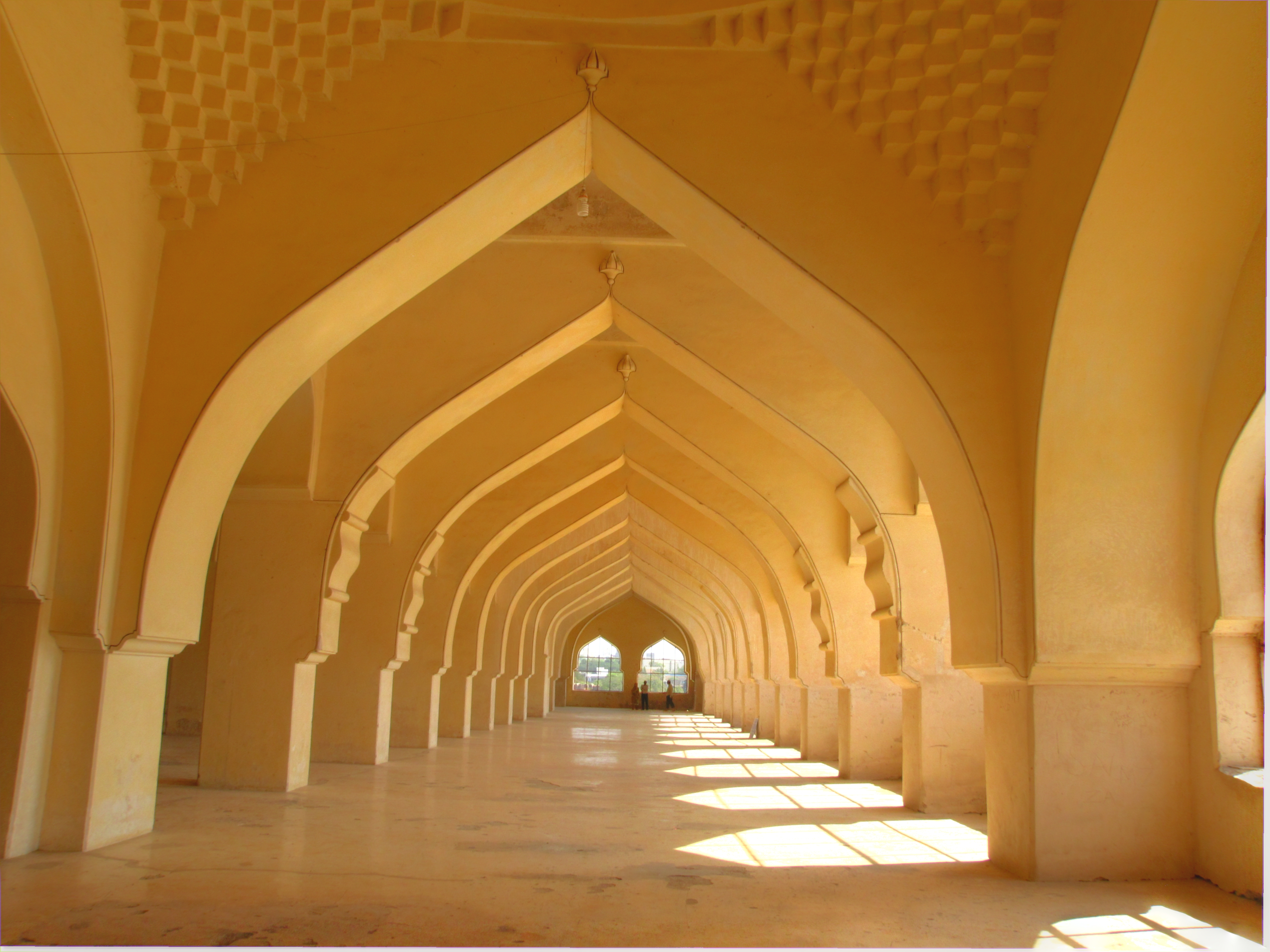
Arches inside the mosque

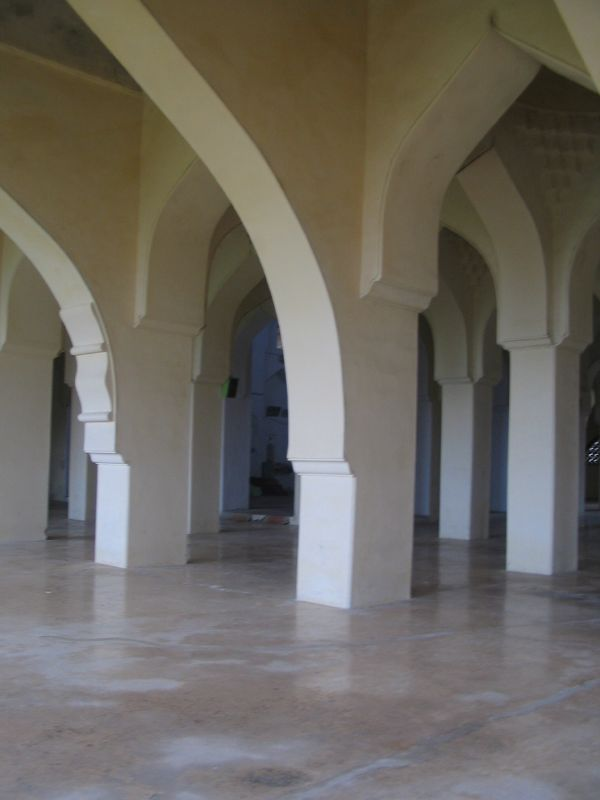
Arches inside the mosque

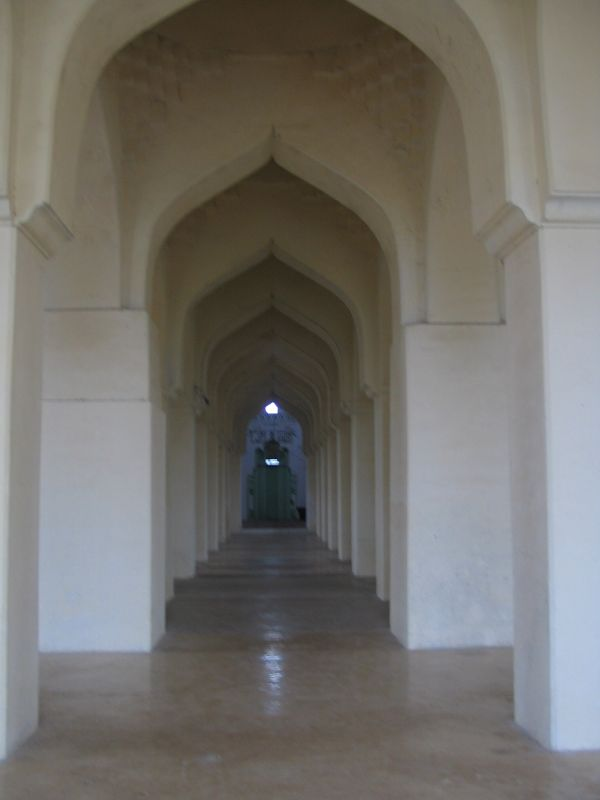
Another view of arches inside the mosque

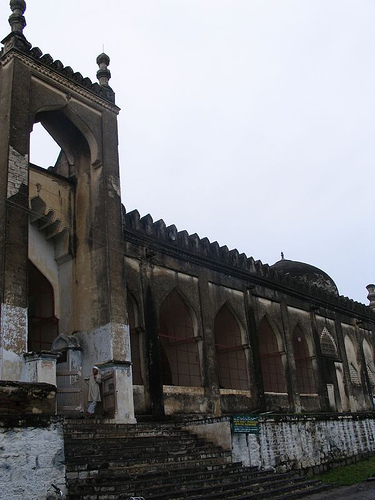
Entrance of the mosque, constructed in the Moorish style

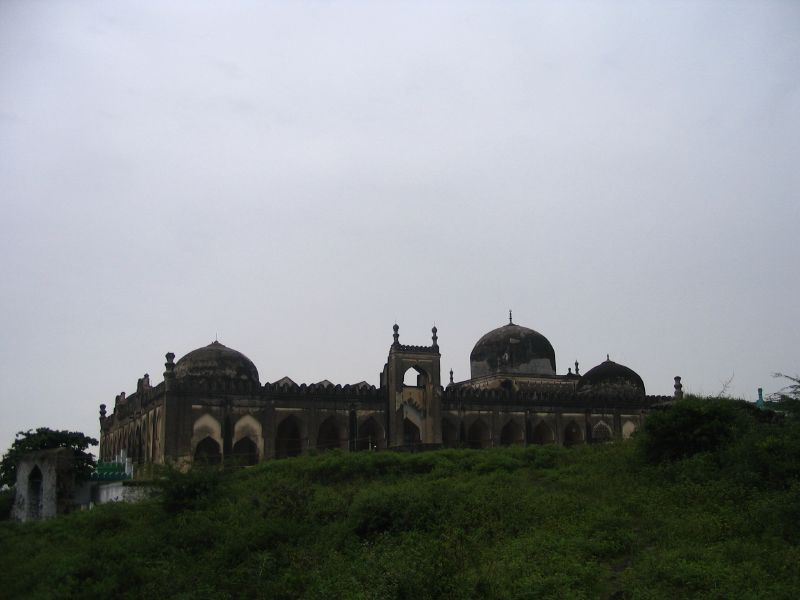
View of the mosque, in monsoon, covered with seasonal grass

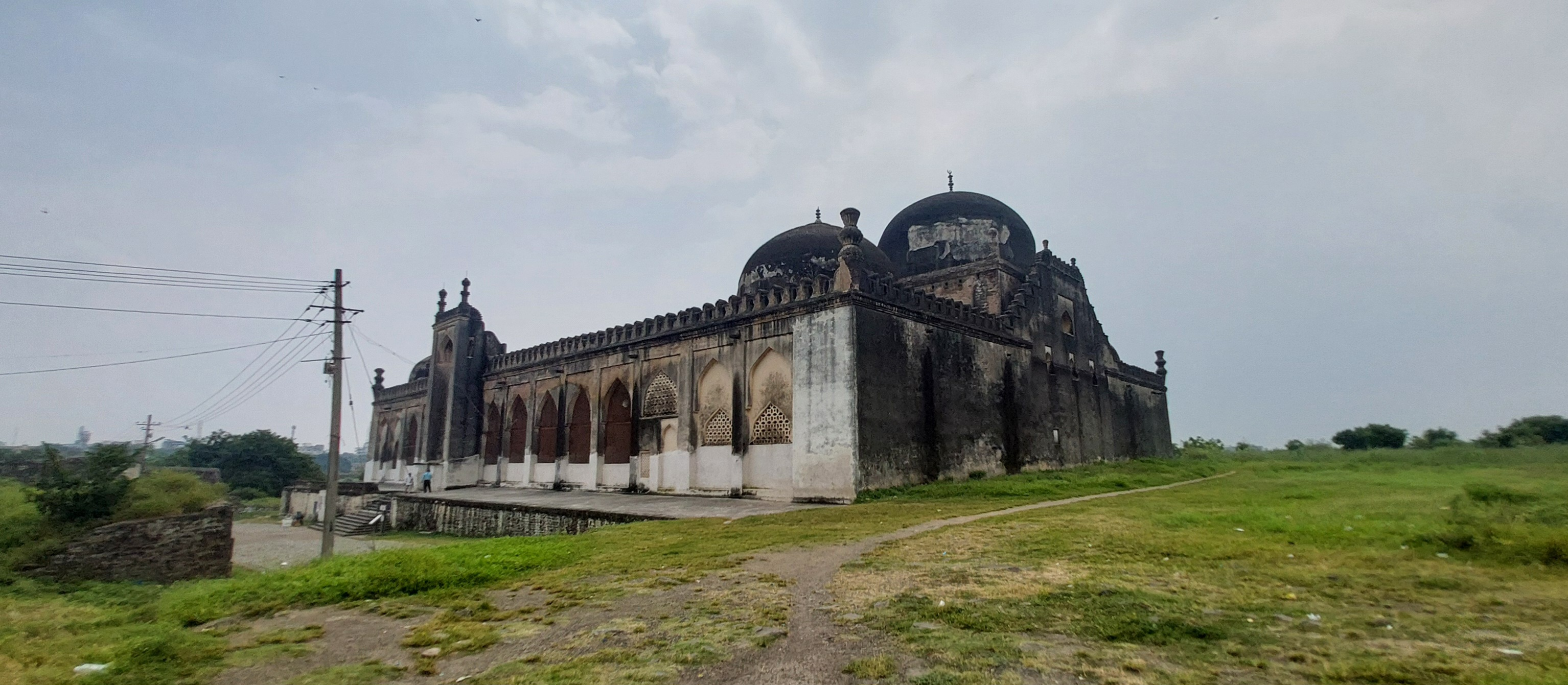
Gulbarga Jama Mosque

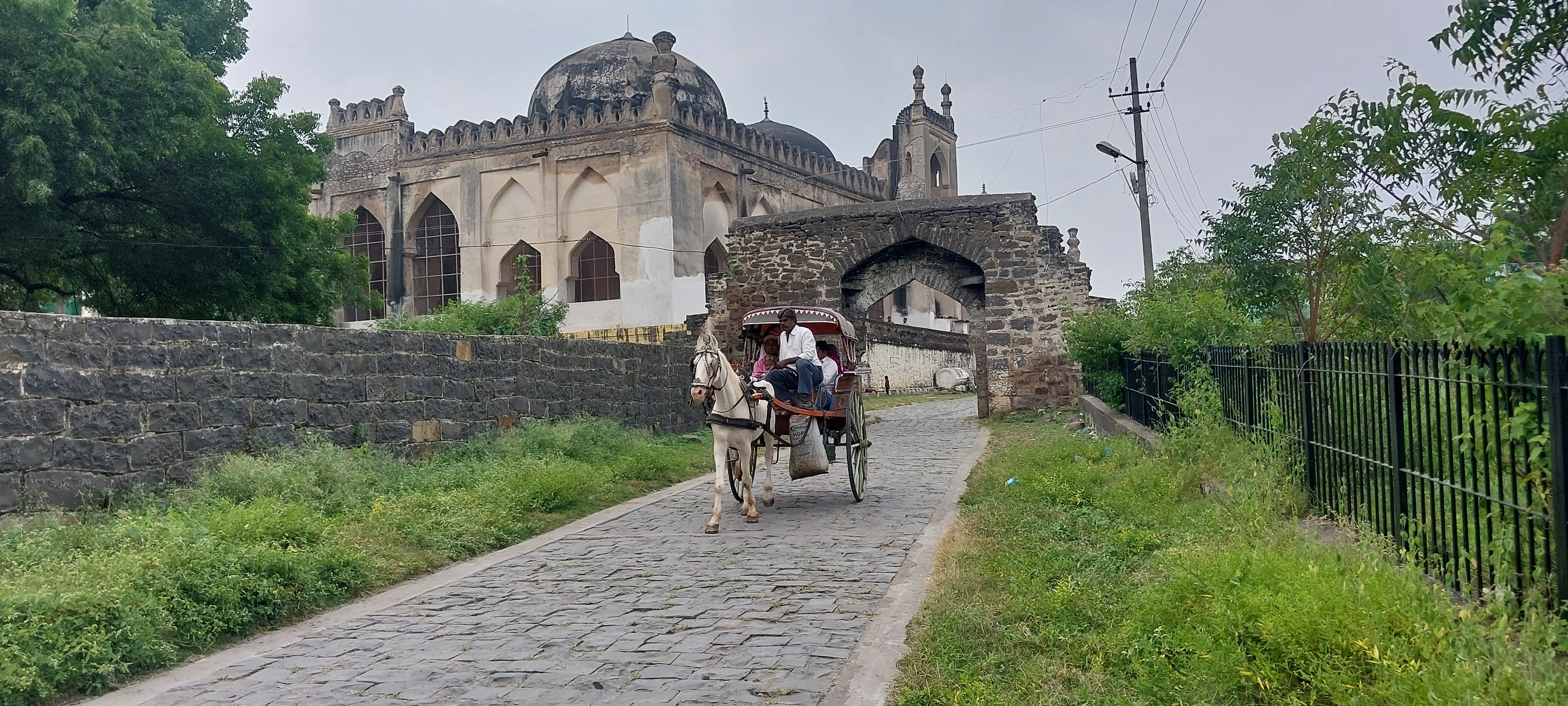
Horse-drawn carriage in front of Gulbarga Jama Mosque

== See also ==
- Islam in India
- List of mosques in India
