= Vallabhgad Fort =

13th century fortification in Karnataka, India

- Belgaum district, Karnataka

Site information
- Type: Hill fort
- Owner: Government of India
- Controlled by: Maratha Empire (1701-1844); United Kingdom: East India Company (1818-1857); British Raj (1857-1947); India (1947-)
- Open to the public: Yes
- Condition: Ruins

Location
- Shown within Karnataka Vallabhgad Fort (India)
- Coordinates: 16°16′47.5″N 74°27′36.3″E
- Height: 3,220 ft (980 m)

Site history
- Materials: Laterite Stone

Vallabhgad Fort is a fort located 57 km (35 mi)from Belgaum. It is in the Hukkeri taluka of Belgaum district, of Karnataka. This fort is an important fort in Belgaum district. The fort is situated on the Khadya hill mountain ridge close to the Pune-Bangalore national Highway.

== History ==
Vallabhgad is one of the ancient forts. Like other forts adjoining Kolhapur district of Maharashtra, the credit for the construction of Vallabhgad goes to Shilahara Raja Bhoj II. In the year 1667, Shivaji conquered this fort. There were 75 governor of the forts (Killedar) on this fort and their descendants are still living on Vallabhgad. In the year 1688, Vallabhgad was conquered by the Mughals. In the year 1701, this fort came back to the Marathas. After this, Karveerkar Chhatrapati was the ruler of this fort. On 14 May 1753, Karveerkar Chhatrapati Sambhaji Raja gave the forts of Vallabhgad, Bhimgad, Pargad and Kalanidhigad to Sadashivrao Bhau Peshwa and the surrounding area as Jahagir. The fort was in the custody of Vantamurikar Desai. Later, during the Maratha rule, when it came to Satarkar, in the year 1776, Satarkar Shahu rebuilt this fort. After this it came under the control of Kolhapur rulers. After that it came under the control of Patwardhan and returned to Kolhapur in 1796. When some talukas of Kolhapur came under British rule, Vallabhgad came under British rule in 1844.

== How to reach ==
The nearest town is Sankeshwar. The base village of the fort is vallabhgad village which is 5 km from Sankeshwar. There is a good motorable road up to the base village and the fort can be reached within 15 minutes from the base. There are good hotels at Sankeshwar and on the national highway.

== Places to see ==
The entrance to the fort is through entrance gate carved in the laterite rock. There is a temple of Murugubai goddess on the fort.There is deep well on the fort and Siddheshwar temple.

== See also ==
- List of forts in Karnataka
- List of forts in India
- Marathi People
- List of Maratha dynasties and states
