= Sanmudageri =

Sanmudageri San Mudageri
- hamlet
- Location in Karnataka, India Sanmudageri (India)
- Coordinates: 14°52′0″N 74°8′0″E
- Country: India
- State: Karnataka
- District: Karwar

Languages
  - Official: Kannada
- Time zone: UTC+5:30 (IST)
- ISO 3166 code: IN-KA
- Vehicle registration: KA
- Website: karnataka.gov.in

San Mudageri (Small Mudageri) is a hamlet in the district of Karwar, lying halfway between the Karnataka, Goa border and the historic fort of Sadashivgad.

== Gallery ==
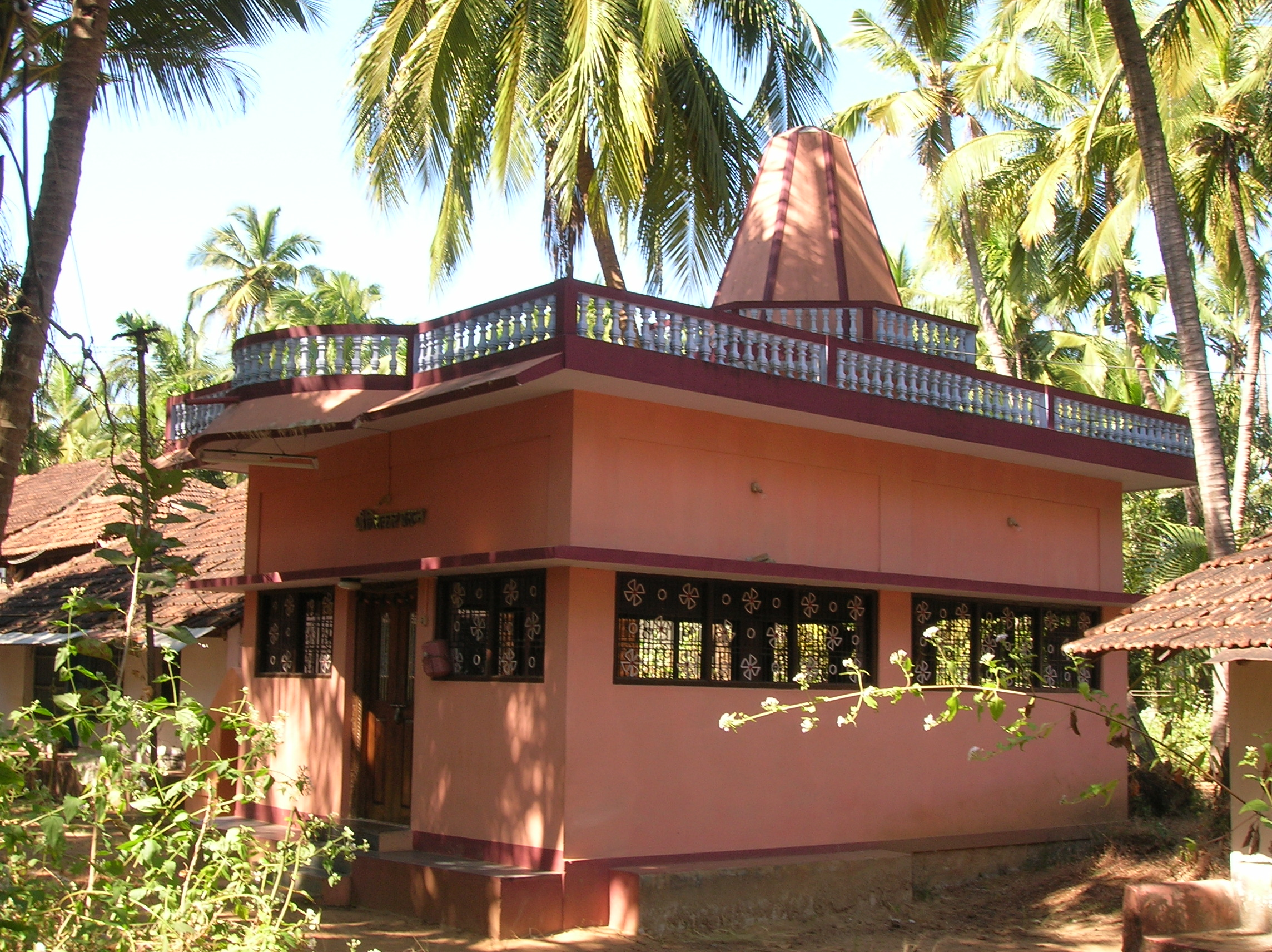
Shri Nirakar Math

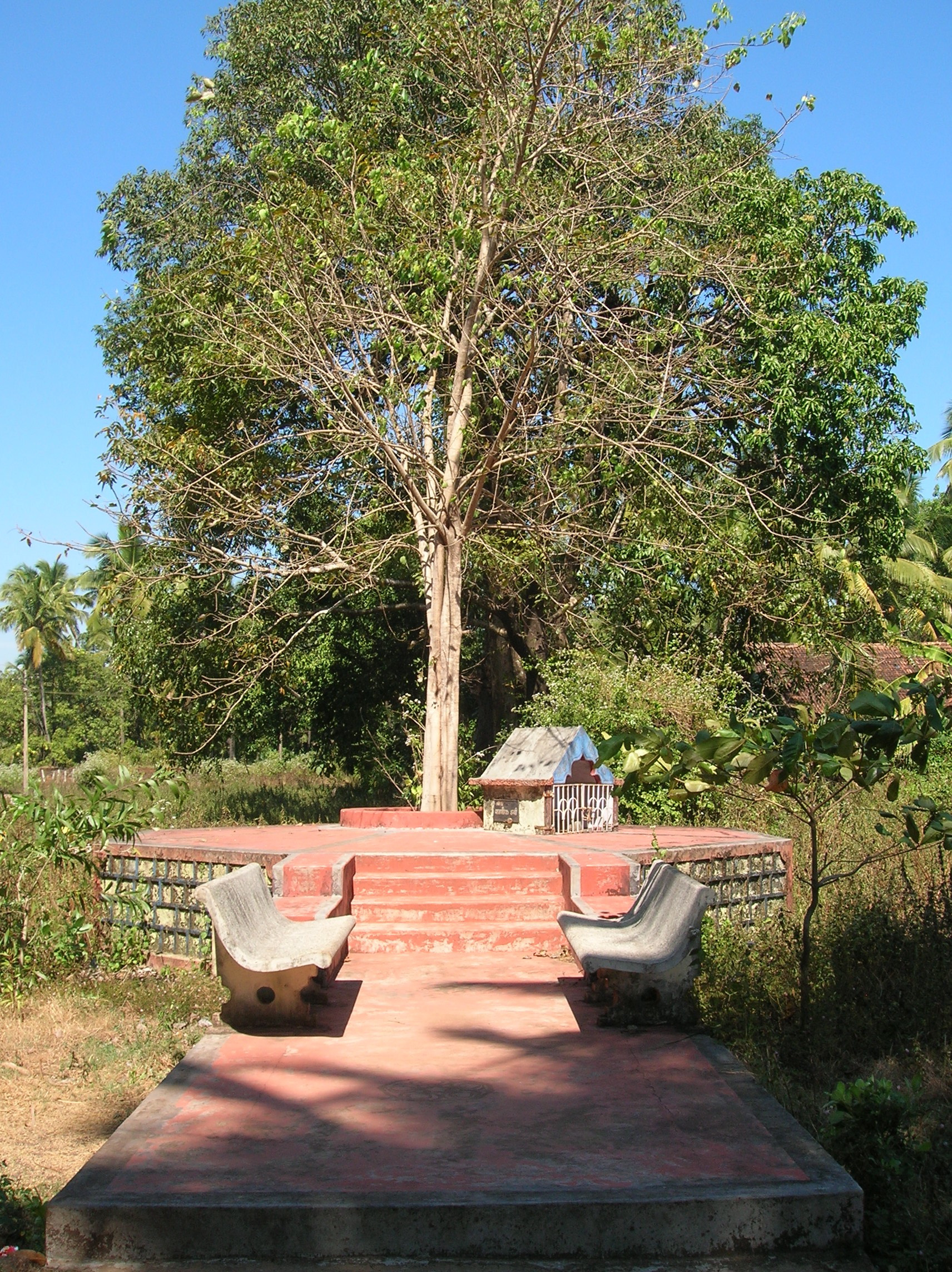
At the entrance to the hamlet.
