= Kittur Fort =

Fortress in Karnataka, India

Coordinates: 15°36′4.5″N 74°47′29.19″E

- Karnataka, India
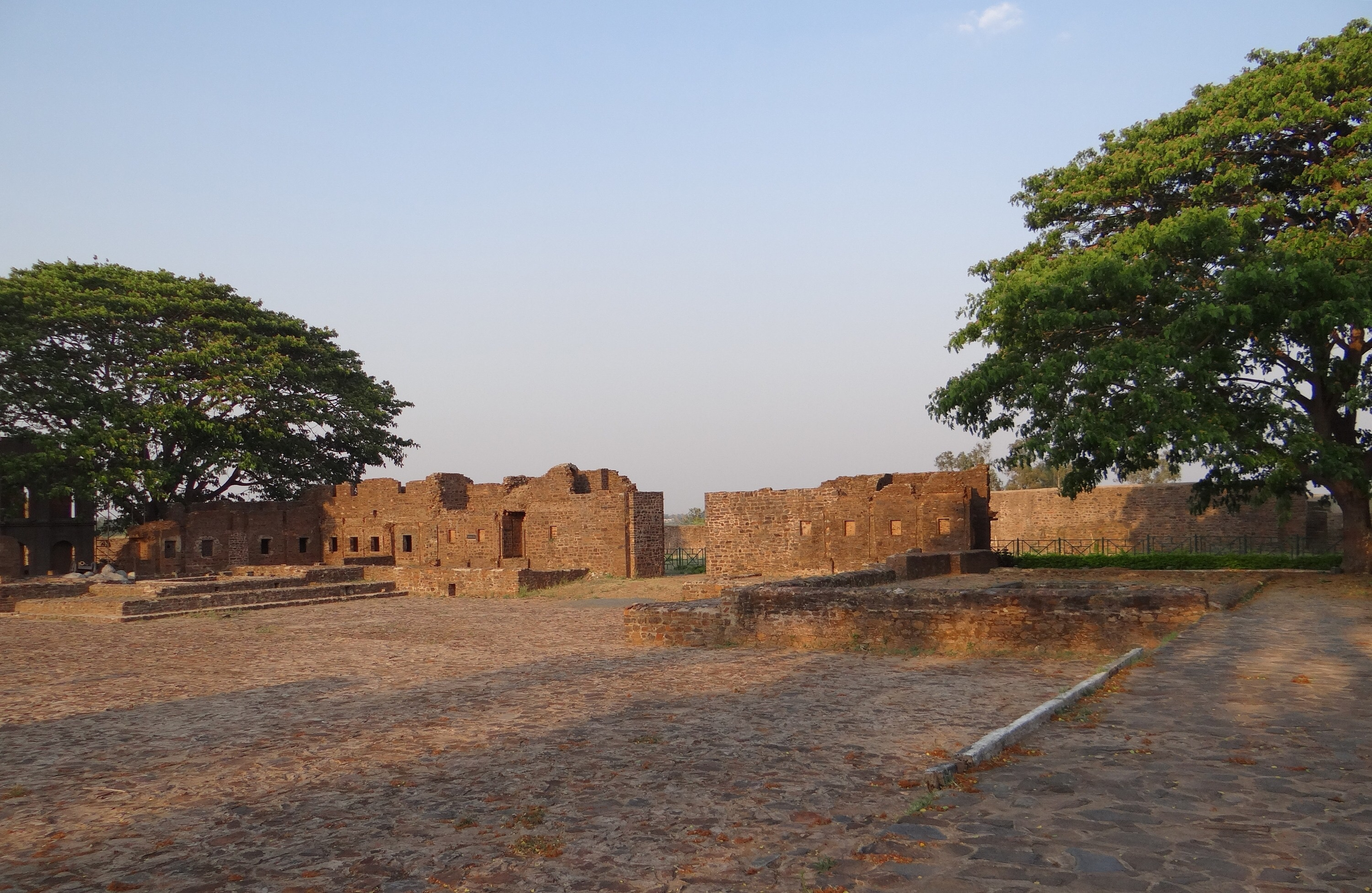

Site information
- Type: Fortress

Location

Site history
- Built: 17th century
- Built by: Allappa Gowda Sardesai

Kittur is a fort located in the Karnataka state of India, it is the former capital of a minor principality as well as a major archaeological site.

== History ==
The fort was built by Allappa Gowda Sardesai, the ruler of the Desai dynasty between 1650 and 1681. It was held by Rani Chennamma, a woman warrior of Karnataka who revolted against the British in 1824. Kittur reached its zenith during the Mallasarja Desai. The place has a Nathapanthi matha in police line area, and temples of Maruti in fort, Kalmeshwara, Dyamavva and Basavanna, the last named a later Chalukyan monument now completely renovated.

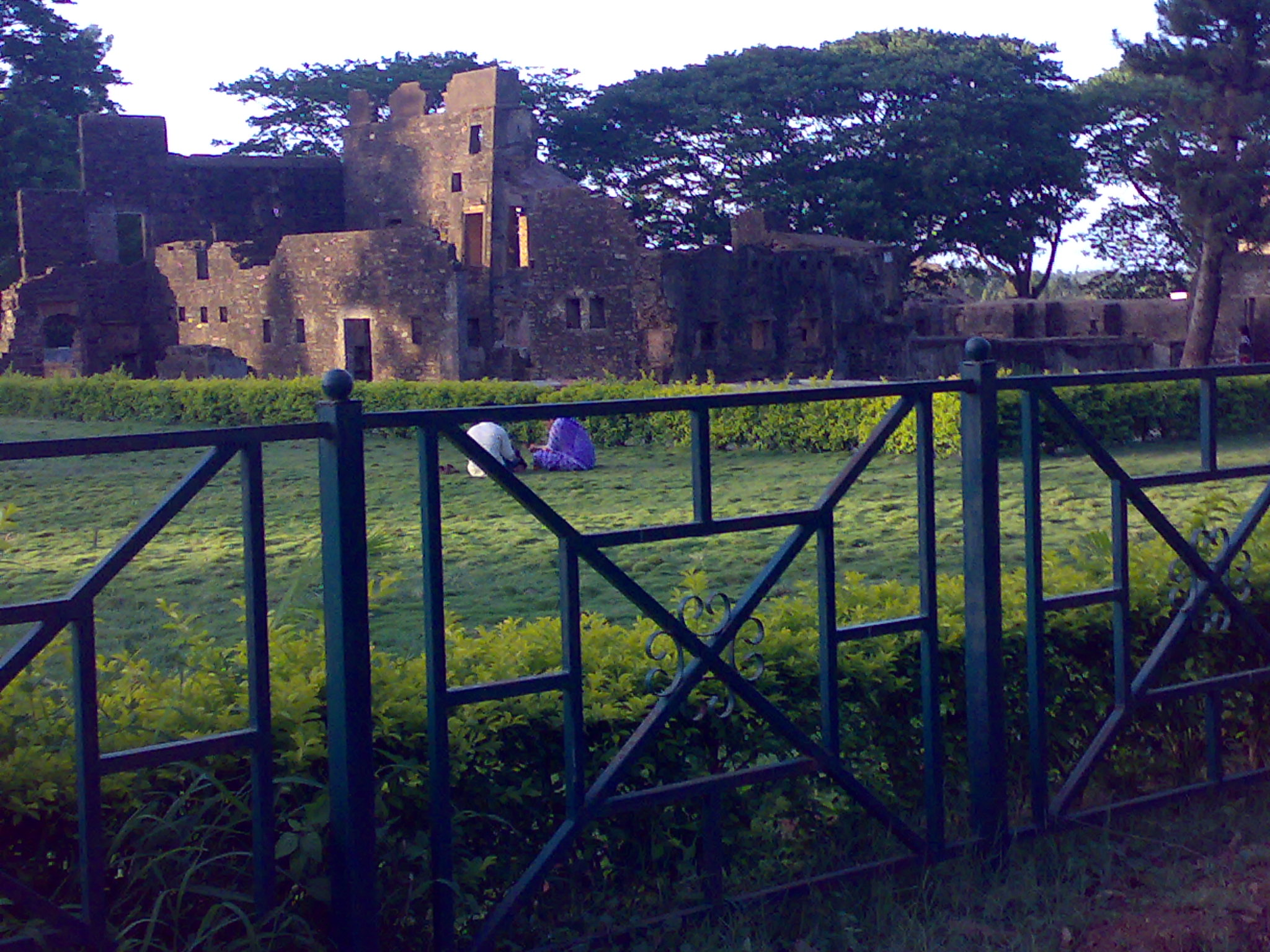
Ruins in the fort

== Location ==
Kittur presently lies in ruins with the Nathapanthi matha site off limits, and the areas Maruti, Kalmeshwara, Dyamavva, Basavanna and the Chalukyan monument, being completely renovated.

== Archaeological museum ==
The archaeological museum, Kittur Rani Chennamma memorial government museum Kittur, at the location is managed by the state department of archaeology and museums, Government of Karnataka. The museum was opened on 10 January 1967, by the then Prime minister Indira Gandhi. It has a rich collection of antiquities found in and around Kittur, which include a few of the weapons, swords, mail-coat, shield, engraved wooden doors and windows of the Kittur palace, inscriptions, herostones, Surya, Vishnu both from Kadrolli, Vishnu and Surya from Devarashigehalli, Subrahmanya from Manoli, Durga from hirebagewadi and many more antiquities, as well as some modern paintings.

== Gallery ==
Some of the exhibits in the museum are shown below.

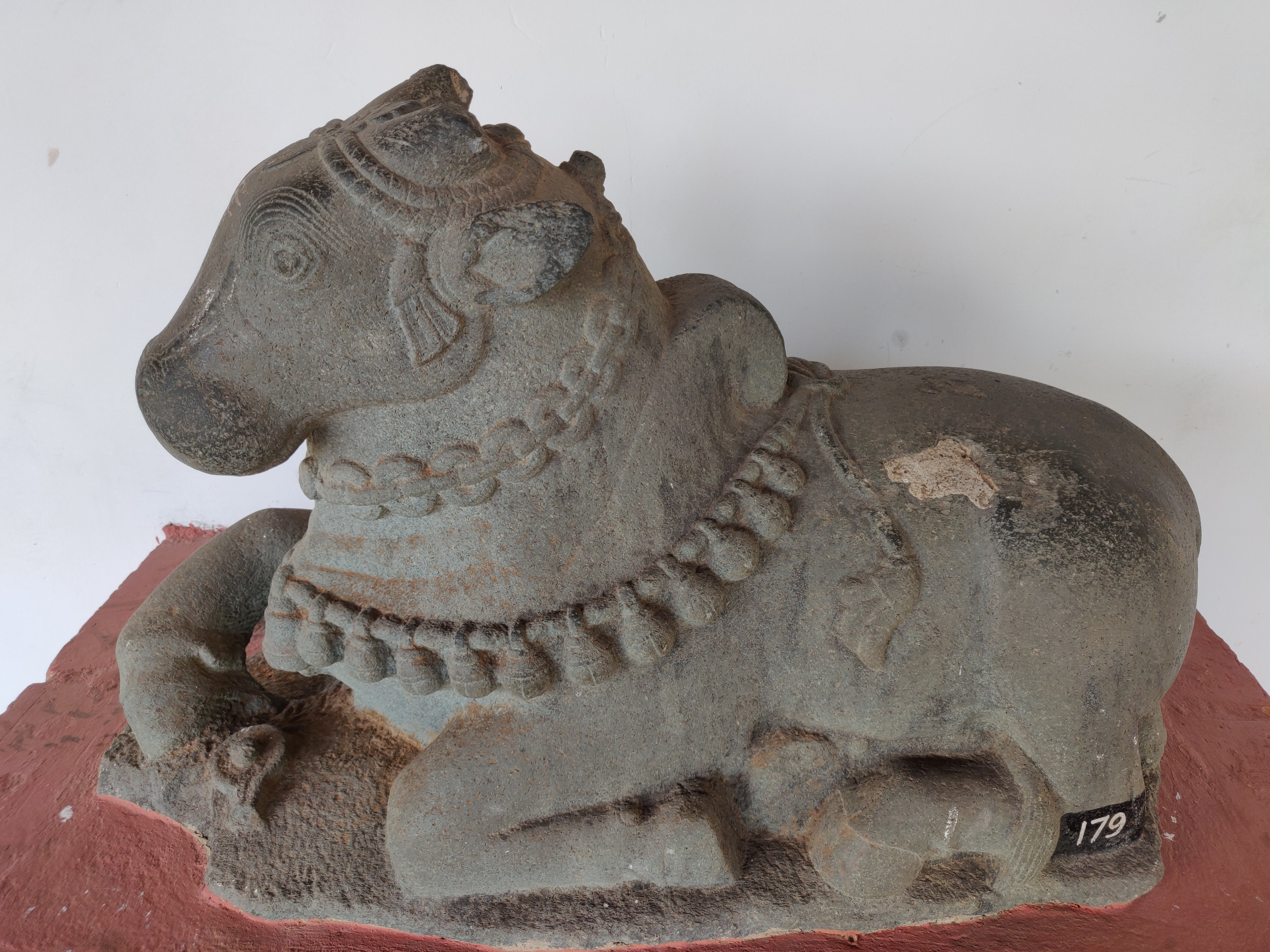
Nandi, 12th Century A.D.

Surya, 10th-11th Century A.D

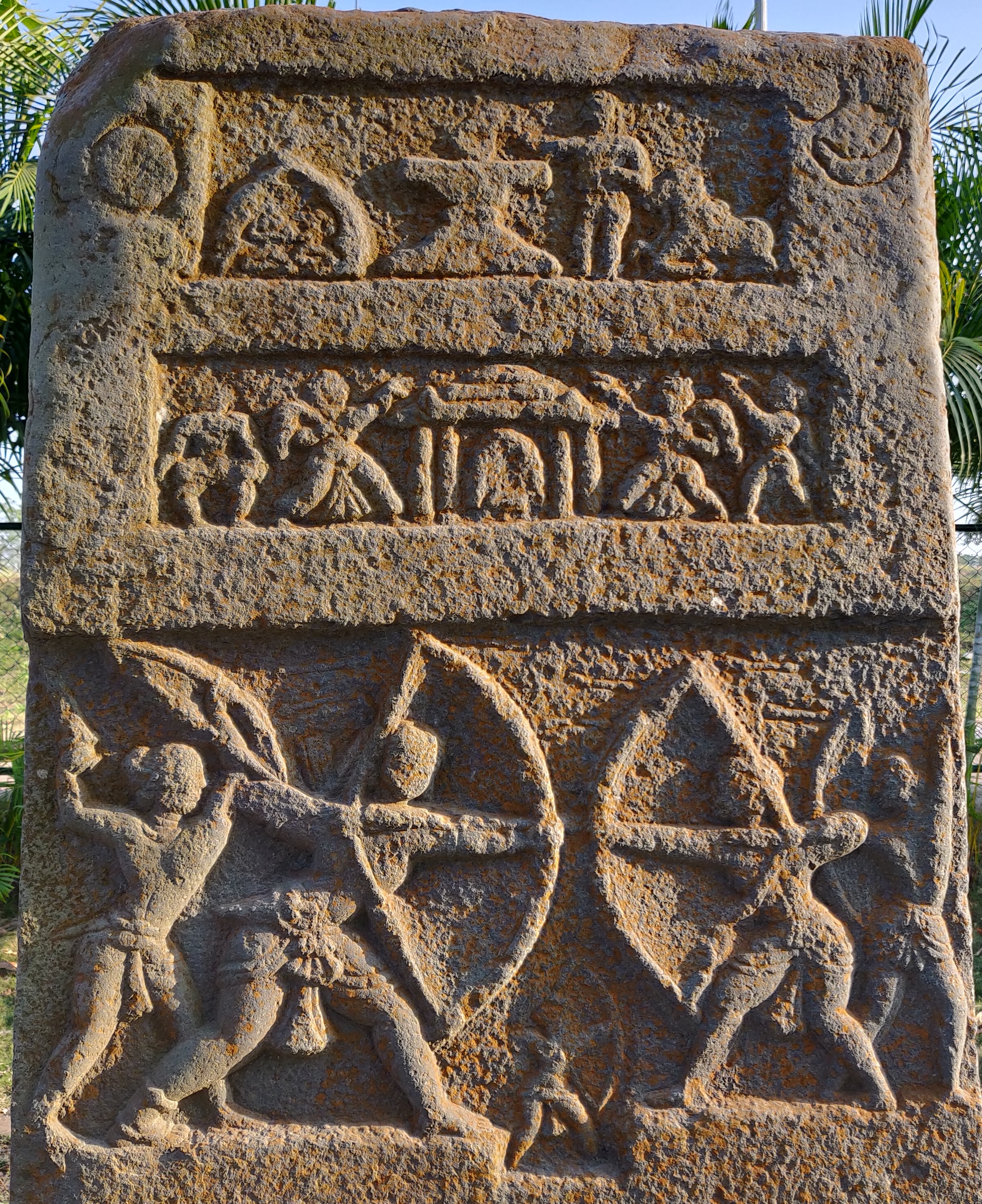
Hero stone, 14th Century A.D.
