= Malliabad =

- Location in Karnataka, India
- Coordinates: 16.2°N 77.37°E
- Country: India
- State: Karnataka
- Region: Bayaluseeme
- District: Raichur district

Languages
  - Official: Kannada
- Time zone: UTC+5:30 (IST)
- PIN: 584101
- Telephone code: 91 8532
- Vehicle registration: KA-36
- Website: raichur.nic.in

Malliabad is 5 km from Raichur. It has a fort and monuments. It is an excavation site of the Archaeology Department; research, conservation and restoration works are in progress, with the help of the Kannada University, Hampi.

== Malliabad fort ==
The Malliabad fort is important in the history of Raichur and North Karnataka. A ruined Vishnu temple and a pair of life-sized elephants carved in white granite are located in the fort. The State Department of Archaeology declared it a protected historical monument. The fort was built in 1294 A.D. by the Kakatiyas of Warangal. It was also associated with the Vijayanagar Empire. In 1520 A.D., Krishnadevaraya stayed here along with his army, during the Battle of Raichur against Adilshahis.

== Life sized elephants ==
Two life sized elephants carved in white granite were found in the Malliabad Fort and these are under the supervision of Government authorities. The elephants are from the period of the Vijayanagar Empire. Initially the elephants were placed in front of the Vishnu temple, and once adorned the gateway of the Malliabad Fort.

== See also ==
- Forts of Karnataka
- North Karnataka
- Kakatiyas
- Raichur
