= Venkateswara Temple, Ramenahalli =

Ramenahalli
- Village
- Location within Karnataka Location within India
- Coordinates: 15°11′12″N 75°53′45″E
- Country: India
- State: Karnataka
- District: Gadag district
- Taluk: Mundargi
- Lok Sabha Constituency: Koppal

Population (2001)
  - Total: 4,068

Languages
  - Official: Kannada
- Time zone: UTC+5:30 (IST)
- Vehicle registration: KA 26

Venkateswara Temple is a Hindu temple situated at Ramenahalli in Mundargi taluk of Gadag district in the Indian state of Karnataka. The Temple is dedicated to Venkateswara, a form of Vishnu. Hammigi is located south of district headquarters Gadag and Taluka headquarters Mundargi.
