= Korlahalli =

Korlahalli Korlhalli
- Village
- Location within Karnataka Location within India
- Coordinates: 15°9′53″N 75°53′0″E
- Country: India
- State: Karnataka
- District: Gadag district
- Taluk: Mundargi
- Lok Sabha Constituency: Koppal

Languages
  - Official: Kannada
- Time zone: UTC+5:30 (IST)
- PIN: 582 118
- Vehicle registration: KA 26

Korlahalli is a village in the Mundargi taluk of Gadag district in the Indian state of Karnataka. Korlahalli is located south of district headquarters Gadag and Taluka headquarters Mundargi.

== Demographics ==
Per the 2011 Census of India, it has a total population of 3336, of whom 1684 are male and 1652 female.

== See also ==
- Tippapura
- Mundargi
- Gadag
- Koppal
