= Medigeshi =

Village in Karnataka, India

Coordinates: 13°50′02″N 77°12′03″E

Medigeshi or Midigeshi is a village in Madhugiri Taluk, Tumkur district in Karnataka, India. It has a population of 2,649 according to 2011 census. The village has a fort which is a tourist attraction.
