= Hammigi =

- Village
- Location within Karnataka Location within India
- Coordinates: 15°2′41″N 75°49′53″E
- Country: India
- State: Karnataka
- District: Gadag district
- Taluk: Mundargi
- Lok Sabha Constituency: Koppal

Population (2001)
  - Total: 4,068

Languages
  - Official: Kannada
- Time zone: UTC+5:30 (IST)
- PIN: 582 118
- Vehicle registration: KA 26

Hammigi is a village in the Mundargi taluk of Gadag district in the Indian state of Karnataka. Hammigi is located south to district headquarters Gadag and Taluka headquarters Mundargi

== Demographics ==
As of 2001 India census, Hammigi had a population of 4,068 with 2,151 males and 1,917 females and 793 households.

== See also ==
- Mundargi
- Gadag
- Koppal
- Hoovina Hadagali
- Honnur
