= Mundargi =

Mundargi Mundaragi
- Town
- Location in Karnataka, India Mundargi (India)
- Coordinates: 15.207°N 75.884°E
- Country: India
- State: Karnataka
- District: Gadag
- Lok Sabha Constituency: Haveri
- Elevation: 528 m (1,732 ft)

Population (2011)
  - Total: 24,919

Languages
  - Official: Kannada
- Time zone: UTC+5:30 (IST)
- PIN: 582118
- Website: www.mundargitown.gov.in

Mundaragi is a municipal town in Gadag district in the Indian state of Karnataka. Mundargi is close to two district headquarters, being 36 kilometres (22 mi) from Gadag and 50 kilometres (31 mi) from Koppal. It is 99 kilometers from Gajendragad. Mundargi is also the taluka headquarter of the same name. Pin code of Mundaragi is 582118.

The name 'Mundaragi' is said to have been derived from the stone hill, located to north-west of the town, called Murudagiri - meaning 'Hill of Lord Shiva'. The river Tungabhadra flows about 7 kilometres (4.3 mi) from Mundargi and provides water for the town.

== Geography ==
Mundargi is located at 15.207°N 75.884°E.

== Demographics ==
As of 2011 India census, the Mundargi Town Municipal Council (TMC) has a population of 24,919, of which 12,513 are males and 12,406 are females.

The population of children with age of 0 – 6 years is 3,215, which is 12.90% of the total population of Mundargi TMC. In the Mundargi TMC, the Female Sex Ratio is 991 against the state average of 973. The Child Sex Ratio in Mundargi is 886 compared to Karnataka state average of 948. Literacy rate of Mundargi city is 79.15%, higher than the state average of 75.36%. In Mundargi, male literacy is 86.82% while female literacy is 71.53%.

== Schools and Colleges ==
Mundargi has many educational institutions:

• J A English Medium school Mundargi

- Jawahar Navodaya Vidyalaya (JNV), (CBSE) located at Bennihalli, 5 km from Mundargi.
- Adarsh Vidyalaya (RMSA) Mundargi located at Korlahalli, 9 km from Mundargi .
- Government P U College
- Govt. I T I College
- Govt. First Grade College
- J T Fort High School
- J A Comp. P U College (aided P U College)
- M S Dambal Women P U College (unaided P U College)
- Lions Comp. P U College (unaided P U College)
- S V S R M P U College (unaided P U College)
- Shri S B S Ayurvedic Medical College (affiliated to Rajiv Gandhi University of Health Sciences, Bengaluru)
- K R Bellad Arts and Commerce College (affiliated to Karnatak University, Dharwad)
- S F S English Medium School
- Shri Swami Vivekanand High School
- Sri V G Limbikayi Higher primary School
- Challenge public school mundargi

== See also ==
- Hammigi
- Gadag
- Venkateshwara Temple, Ramenahalli
