= List of dams and reservoirs in Karnataka =

This is a list of dams and reservoirs that are located in the Indian state of Karnataka.

== List with specifications ==
Dam/Reservoir	River	Location	Storage capacity (tmcft)	Reservoir level (m)	Height of dam (m)	Length of dam (m)	No. of gates	Type	Reservoir area (km^{2})	Completed year	Purpose
Almatti Dam	Krishna	Nidagundi taluk, Bijapur district	123.25	519.6	49.29	1564.85	26	Earth-fill, Gravity & Masonry dam	540.11	1999	Irrigation & Hydroelectric
Basava Sagara Dam(Narayanpur Dam)	Krishna	Narayanapur, Hunasagi taluk, Yadgir district	37.965	492.252	29.72	10637.52	30	Earth-fill, Gravity & Masonry dam	132.06	1982	Irrigation & Hydroelectric
Raja Lakhamagowda dam	Ghataprabha	Hidkal, Hukkeri taluk, Belgaum district	51.16	745.79	53.34	10183	10	Earth-fill, Gravity & Masonry dam	63.38	1977	Irrigation & Hydroelectric
Renuka Sagara Dam	Malaprabha	Navilutheertha, Saundatti taluk, Belgaum district	37.73	633.83	43.13	154.52	4	Gravity & Masonry dam	54.97	1972	Irrigation & Hydroelectric
Vani Vilasa Sagara	Vedavathi	Marikanive, Hiriyur Taluk, Chitradurga district	30.442	652.28	43.28	405.4	2	Earth-fill, Gravity & Masonry dam	87.63	1907	Irrigation & Hydroelectric
Upper Tunga Dam	Tunga	Gajanur, Shimoga	3.24	588.24	17.5	791.39	22	Earth-fill, Gravity & Masonry dam	13.389	2007	Irrigation & Hydroelectric
Bhadra Dam	Bhadra	Lakkavalli, Tarikere taluk, Chikmagaluru district	71.50	6314.54	59.13	1708	4	Earth-fill, Gravity & Masonry dam	112.508	1965	Irrigation & Hydroelectric
Tungabhadra Dam	Tungabhadra	Hospet, Vijayanagara district	132.47	497.74	49.39	2443	33	Earth-fill, Gravity & Masonry dam	378	1953	Irrigation & Hydroelectric
Hemavathi Reservoir	Hemavathi	Gorur, Hassan district	35.76	489.63	58.50	4692	6	Earth-fill, Masonry dam, Spillway & Gravity	85.02	1979	Irrigation
Kabini Reservoir	Kabini	Heggadadevanakote Taluk, Mysore	19.52	696	59.44	2732	4	Earth-fill, Gravity & Masonry dam	-	1974	Irrigation & Hydroelectric
Harangi Reservoir	Harangi	Hudgur, Kushalnagar taluk, Kodagu district	8.07	871.42	53	845.8	4	Earth-fill, Gravity & Masonry dam	19.081	1982	Irrigation & Hydroelectric
Krishna Raja Sagara Dam	Kaveri	Mandya	45.05	791	42.62	2621	18	Gravity & Masonry dam	107.808	1931	Irrigation & Hydroelectric
Linganamakki Dam	Sharavathi	Linganamakki, Sagara Taluk, Shimoga district	156.62	554.43	61.26	2749.29	11	Earth-fill, Gravity & Masonry dam	317.28	1964	Hydroelectric
Chakra Reservoir	Chakra	Chakra Nagar, Hosanagar Taluk, Shimoga	7.3	575	84	570	1	Rock-fill	-	1985	Irrigation
Savehaklu Reservoir	Chakra	Chakra Nagar, Hosanagar Taluk, Shimoga	4.1	582	59	633	1	Rock-fill	-	1980	Irrigation
Mani Reservoir	Varahi	Hummadagallu, Hosanagar Taluk, Shimoga	35.2	594.36	59	580	3	Earth-fill, Gravity & Masonry dam	-	1988	Hydroelectric
Supa Dam	Kali	Ganesha Gudi, Joida Taluk, Uttara Kannada district	147.54	564	101	331.29	3	Gravity & Masonry dam	124	1987	Hydroelectric
Kodasalli Dam	Kali	Kodasalli, Yellapur Taluk, Uttara Kannada district	10.14	75.5 m	52.1	534	9	Earth-fill, Gravity & Masonry dam	20.85	2000	Hydroelectric
Kadra Dam	Kali	Virje Karwar Taluk, Uttara Kannada district	13.74	34.50 m	40.50	2313	10	Earth-fill, Gravity & Masonry dam	32.48	1997	Hydroelectric
Shanti Sagara	Haridra	Kerebilchi, Channagiri taluk, Davanagere district	3.5	612	8	290	2	Earth-fill	26.51	-	Irrigation
Karanja Dam	Karanja	Byalahalli, Bhalki taluk, Bidar district	13.1	587	19	3480	6	-	45	1989	irrigation

== See also ==
- List of dams and reservoirs in India
