= Shirasangi =

- Village
- Interactive map of Shirasangi
- Country: India
- State: Karnataka
- District: Belagavi

Languages
  - Official: Kannada
- Time zone: UTC+5:30 (IST)

Shirasangi is a village in Belagavi District of Karnataka, India. Shirasangi is well known for the famous Shri Kalikadevi temple and the Shirsangi Fort. Shirsangi Kalikadevi temple is considered the place where in ancient time, Shringa Maharishi worshipped the Goddess Shri Kalikadevi and requested her to bless the place, resulting in the temple.

== Historical monuments ==
- Sirsangi Vaade - a small fort belonging to Shri Tyagaveera Lingraj Desai's family
- Sirsangi Kalika Temple - ancient stone temple dating back to 1st century
- Siddeshwaragavi - cave temple dedicated to Shiva Linga
- Bababudan Durgah - Sufi tomb and mosque
- Basavana Bhavi - A small kalyani near the Kalikadevi temple.
- Shri Mallikarjuna Temple - A small Shiva temple on the hill top near kalikadevi temple.

== See also ==
- Hooli
- Saundatti
- Navilateertha
- Parasgad Fort
- Sogal
- North Karnataka
- Tourism in North Karnataka
