= Raja Lakhamagouda Sardesai =

Lakhamagouda Sardesai
- Coronation: 1877
- Born: Appasaheb; 29 July 1864; Ammanagi, Belagavi district
- Wife: Parvatidevi
- Issue: Basava Prabhu
- House: Vantamuri Palace (Submerged completely in 1978-79 in the Hidkal dam backwater)
- Occupation: Ruler

Raja Lakhamagouda Sardesai (1864–1942) was an Indian philanthropist, first Barrister-at-Law from Karnataka and a ruler of Vantamuri princely state in Belagavi district. He was the 16th ruler of Vantamuri princely state. He ascended the throne at the age of 13 years in 1877. The princely state had a Wada (traditional mansion) at Vantamuri which was built by Prabhu Basavantrao and it was submerged in 1978-79 when a dam was constructed at Hidkal.

== Early life and education ==
He was born on 29 July 1864 in Ammanagi village of Belagavi district. His birthname was Appasaheb. He completed his primary education in Marathi medium in Ammanagi village. Later, he went to Kolhapur for his secondary education where most of the prince children used to study. He partly completed his secondary education in Kolhapur and completed latter secondary education in Belagavi at Sardar High School. Later in 1882, he enrolled at Bombay University.

In 1880, he married a woman named Parvatidevi who gave birth to a son in 1884 named Basava Prabhu.

Sardesai studied law in England. He was appointed as first-class Judge of Vantamuri by the British Government in 1888 on his return from England after his law degree completion.

== Notable works and Philanthropy ==
- He constructed Pasi Pool bridge over Ghataprabha River, road from Hattaragi to Pachapur and he has also constructed guest House, medical Shop and primary school with his own expenditure.
- He donated 55,000 rupees in 1901 to Lingayat Education Association in Dharwad which provided hostel cum boarding facility to Veerashaiva Lingayat students.
- He donated 20,000 rupees to Karnatak Lingayat Education Society and it named a science college in Belagavi after him as Raja Lakhamagouda Science Institute in 1935.
- He also made donations to Deccan Education Society, Willingdon College Sangli, Lady Irwin College Delhi, and several other educational institutions.
- Despite the sorrow of his wife Paravatidevi's death in 1917 he continued his philanthropy and donated to hospitals.
- He donated one lakh rupees to Karnataka Law Society.

== Awards and honours ==
- He was conferred the order of Companion of the Indian Empire(CIE) in 1919 and the title rajah in 1930 by British Government for his service towards community and education.
- Dharwad High School was renamed as Raja Lakhamgouda Sardesai High School in 1929.

== Death ==
He died at the age of 80 years in 1942.

== Recognition ==
- 156th birth anniversary of Sardesai was celebrated at KLE Society's Raja Lakhamagouda Science Institute (Autonomous).
