= Chikkumbi =

- Village
- Location in Karnataka, India Chikkumbi (India)
- Coordinates: 15°44′15″N 75°12′45″E
- Country: India
- State: Karnataka
- District: Belgaavi
- Talukas: Saundatti

Languages
  - Official: Kannada
- Time zone: UTC+5:30 (IST)
- PIN: 591110

Chikkumbi is a village in Belgaavi district in the southern state of Karnataka, India.
