= Raja Lakhamagouda dam =

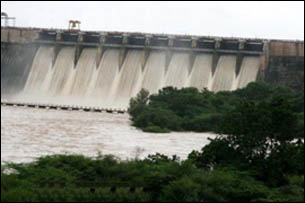
- Location: Hidkal, Belagavi district, Karnataka, India
- Coordinates: 16°08′35″N 74°38′34″E
- Opening date: 1977 AD

Dam and spillways
- Impounds: Ghataprabha River
- Height: 204.98 ft (62.48 m)
- Length: 10.18 km (6.33 mi)

Reservoir
- Creates: Raja Lakhamagouda reservoir ರಾಜಾ ಲಖಮಗೌಡ ಜಲಾಶಯ
- Total capacity: 51.16 Tmcft

Raja Lakhamagouda dam, also known as Hidkal dam, is constructed across the Ghataprabha River in Karnataka in the Krishna River basin. It is situated at Hidkal village in Hukkeri Taluk of Belagavi district in North Karnataka, India.

== Appearance ==
The dam, with a height of 62.48 metres, and 10 Vertical Crest Gates, impounds a large reservoir with a gross surface area of 63.38 square kilometres, and a storage capacity of 51.16 Tmcft. It is an earthen and masonry dam that caters to the irrigation needs of over 8,20,000 acres, and hydel power generation.

== Construction ==
It was constructed as a part of the Ghataprabha Irrigation project, which was completed in three phases and finished in 2009. The dam is named after Raja Lakhamagouda Sardesai, a philanthropist and Zamindar of Vantamuri.

== See also ==
- List of dams and reservoirs in Karnataka
