= Hanchinala =

Hanchinala ನಮ್ಮ ಹೆಮ್ಮೆ ನಮ್ಮ ಹಂಚಿನಾಳ
- Village
- Location in Karnataka, India Hanchinala (India)
- Coordinates: 15.6811°N 75.2412°E
- Country: India
- State: Karnataka
- District: Belgaum

Government
  - Type: Panchayat raj
  - Body: Gram panchayat

Population (2001)
  - Total: 6,232

Languages
  - Official: Kannada
- Time zone: UTC+5:30 (IST)
- PIN: 591110
- ISO 3166 code: IN-KA
- Vehicle registration: KA
- Website: karnataka.gov.in

Hanchinala (also written Hanchinal) is a village in the Saundatti taluka of Belgaum district in Karnataka. In 2001, it had a population of 6232 with 3189 males and 3043 females.
