= Hooli =

- Town
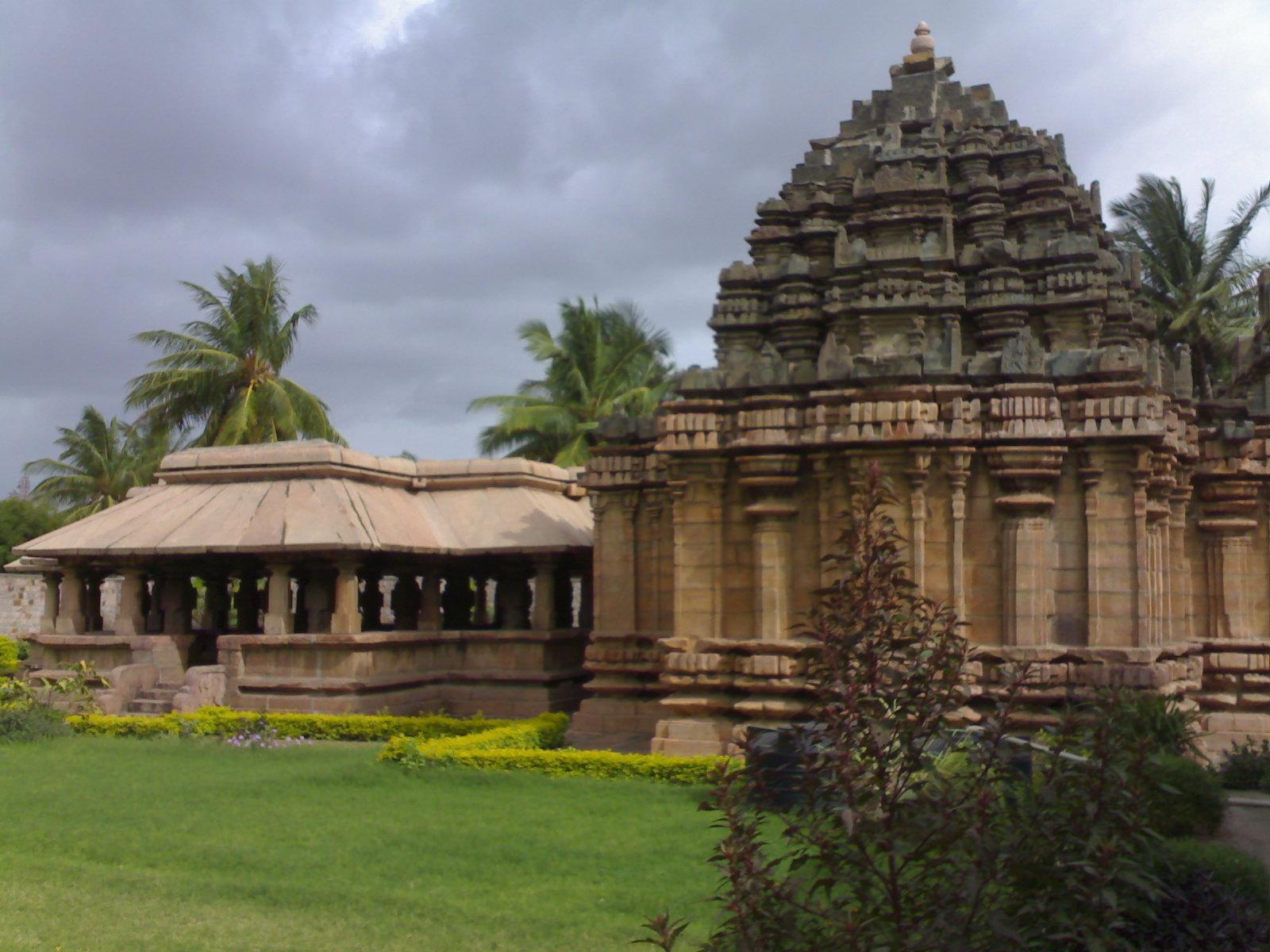
- Panchalingeshwara temple at Hooli

- Location in Karnataka, India
- Coordinates: 15.7833°N 75.1167°E
- Country: India
- State: Karnataka
- District: Belgaum

Languages
  - Official: Kannada
- Time zone: UTC+5:30 (IST)
- Postal code: 591126
- ISO 3166 code: IN-KA
- Vehicle registration: KA-24
- Nearest city: Saundatti
- Website: karnataka.gov.in

Hooli is a town in Belagaavi District in Karnataka, India. It is about 9 km (5.6 mi) from Saundatti. One of the oldest villages in the Belgaum District, Hooli is the site of the Panchaligeswara temple and the Trikuteshwara Temple. The village is historically rich, boasting of a ruined fort atop a hill and numerous temples. Hooli has been under the rule of the Rattas of Saundatti, Patwardhans of Ramdurg and most of the temples feature Chalukya architecture and were initially Jain Bastis or Basadis indicating a Chalukya rule. The name of the village is a corrupted form of PooValli meaning a flowery ear ornament. The village was also called Mahishpatinagar in ancient times.

== Hooli temples ==
=== Panchalingeshwara temple Hooli ===
The nice architecture of Hooli Panchalingeshwar Temple is to be adored. It is a protected monument that comes under Archaeological Survey of India. Earlier, during summer afternoons people used to rest in the shade of this temple. Because the temple was made of stone, it was unbelievably cool even in the scorching summer.

Opposite the Panchalingeshwara temple is the relatively modern Hari Mandir. The Sant Culture or Nath tradition influenced heavily by Jnaneshwar flourished here.

=== Conservation and restoration ===
Other than Panchalingeshwara Temple, Hooli has many other old temples; most of them are now in ruins due to negligence. One can be amazed by the sculptures and carvings on the stone. Most of the temples have their floor dug up for treasure hunts, so much is lost and stolen.

Other temples at Hooli include:

- Andhakeshwara Temple
- Bhavnisankara Temple
- Kalmeshwara Temple
- Kashi Vishwanatha Temple
- Madaneshwara Temple
- Suryanarayan Temple
- Tarkeshwara Temple
- Hooli Sangameshwar Ajjanavaru Temple
- Trikooteshwara Temple Hooli
- Beerdevar temple Hooli

=== Tourism plans ===
There probably are plans or proposals to convert the Panchlingeshwar Temple site to a tourist destination. To achieve this objective, the concerned central/state department has performed survey and has been in discussion with the local people. This development may involve the demolition of local houses within the perimeter of some 100–200 meters (330–660 ft). In case this happens, it would be a great shame, as this very structures, most of them mud houses surrounding the temple are also a part of the village history and carry invaluable importance to the local architecture settings. In India, the lessons needs to be derived from observing how some of the world heritage sites around the world, is being preserved and more importantly recreated as its original state.

An ideal solution to preserve the architecture and as well encourage tourism is to develop a tourism infrastructure outside the village and then facilitate organized tours to the temple. Hotels, restaurants, shops, parking places etc. should not be allowed to flourish anywhere within the existing village or nearby the temple site and instead be located outside the village. If required, evacuate the population in affected perimeter, but preserve each and every structures as they are and convert them to museums. The village Hooli is still alive with activity and its surroundings has lot of history and architecture to share with tourists and fill few museums around the site.

Any development in the vicinity of the site is going to be disastrous, difficult to maintain, and lose the charm of the very architecture piece, that is being showcased. Not to say that the impacted villagers will not only lose their ancestral home, but instead become detached from the village itself, where, their ancestors once upon a time created and served this archaeological masterpiece. Rather, the old mud houses should be maintained as they are and there owners / residents should be made partners in their conservation. For someone, who has experienced and lived in the village 30 or 40 years back, which once had streets paved with cobbled stones, the ruins of temple around the village which had number of precious architecture pieces, is now all but stolen or destroyed. Further degradation is not necessary in name of the preservation and encouraging tourism. Hooli is also known as "Shiva Kashi".

== Shivakashi Stream ==
Shivakashi Valley seems to be a place which was once densely covered by trees. At this location you can find the marks left by monsoon springs and water falls. Based on stories from village elders there were tigers once upon a time. Village folks hunted them off decades ago.

The location otherwise is dotted with many temples and wells. There is a Dhyan Mandir used by Krishnaraj Swamiji as the legend has it. The view from the top of the hill is picturesque. The water cascades down at various levels and flows to join the lake in front of KereSiddeshwara Temple.

== Hooli surname ==
Ancestors born & brought up at this place migrated to nearby villages over a long period of time, they were referred to as people from "Hooli", hence many families have their surnames as "Hooli".

However, the most common surnames in the Hooli village itself are Munavalli, Kulkarni, Patil, Hirekumbi, Goudar, Chikkareddi. These families have been living in the same area for hundreds of years now and every family is invariably interrelated.

== Gallery ==
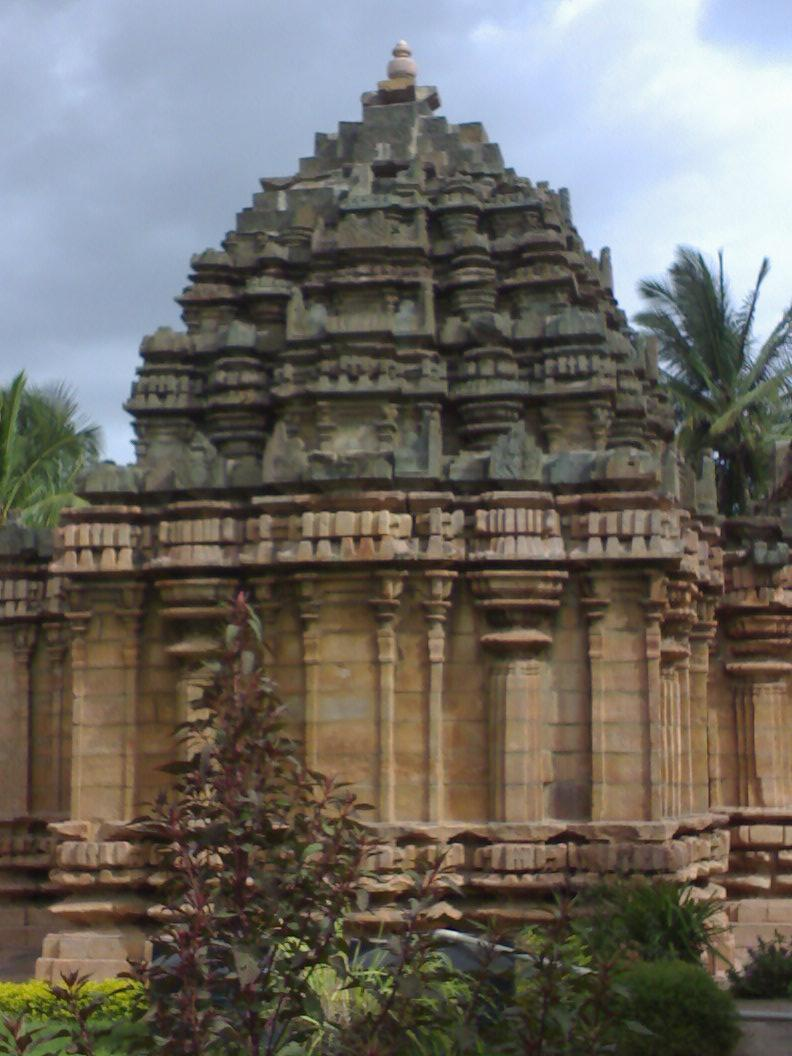
Hooli Panchalingeshwara temple

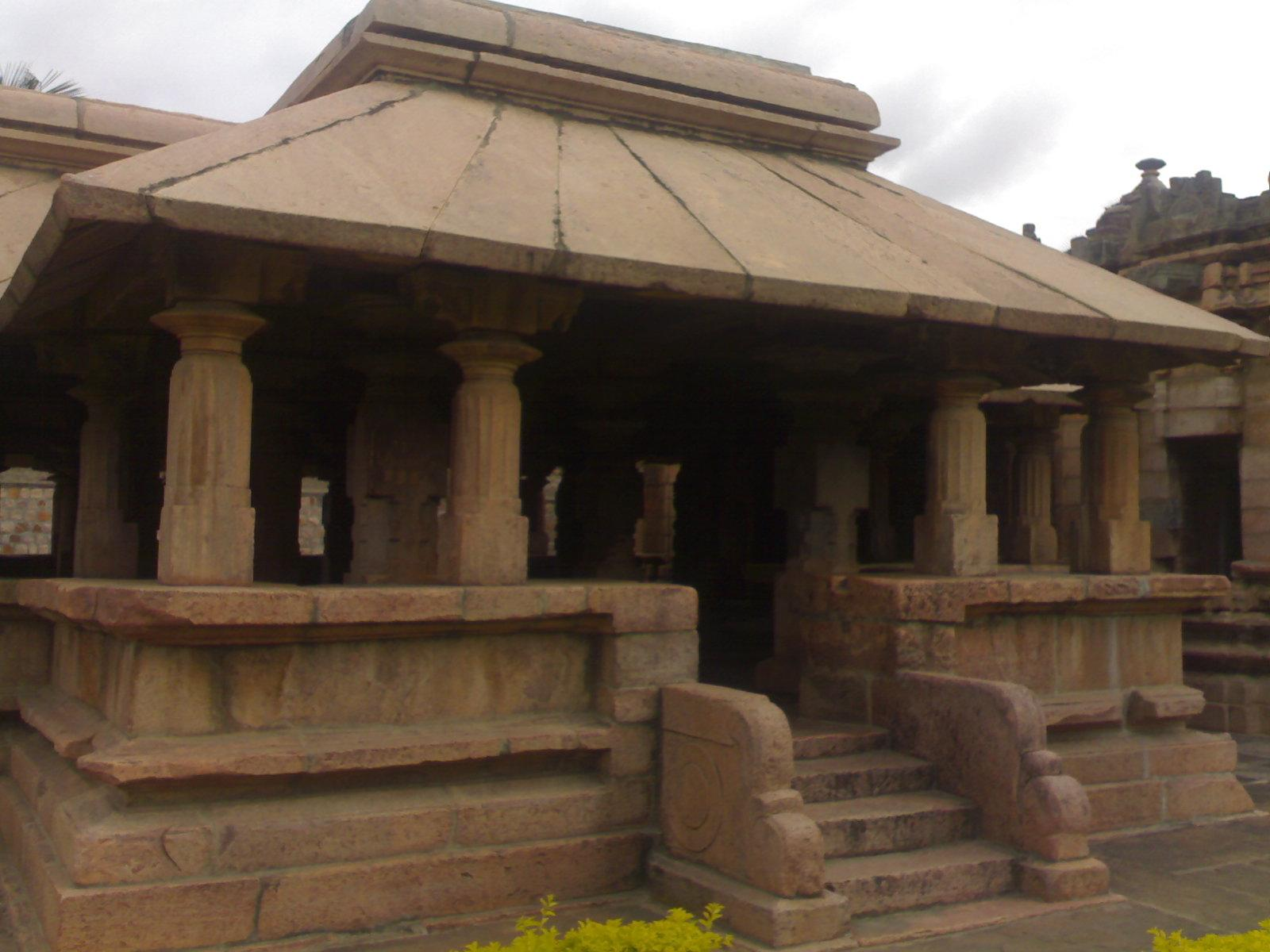
Hooli Panchalingeshwara temple

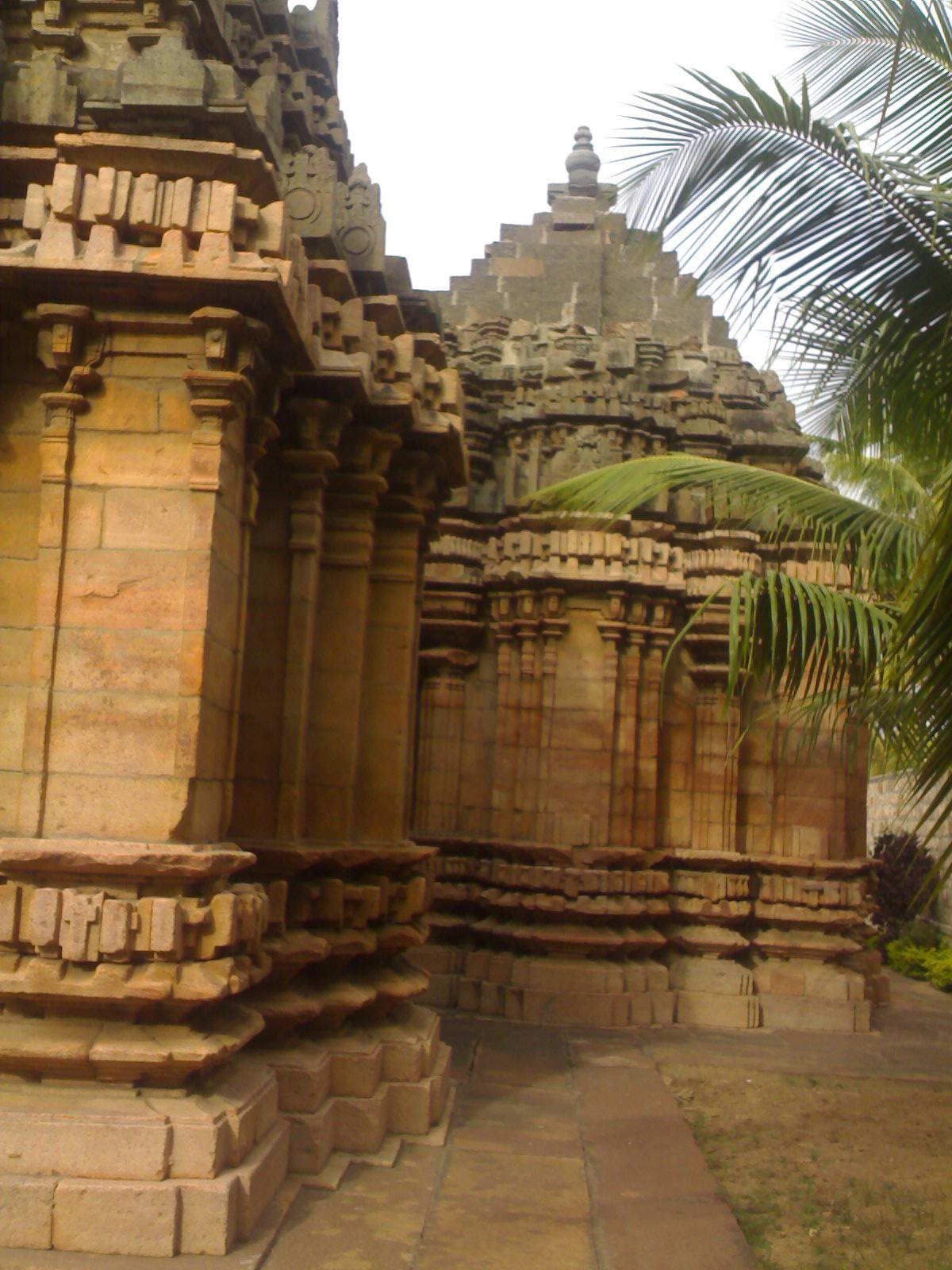
Hooli Panchalingeshwara temple

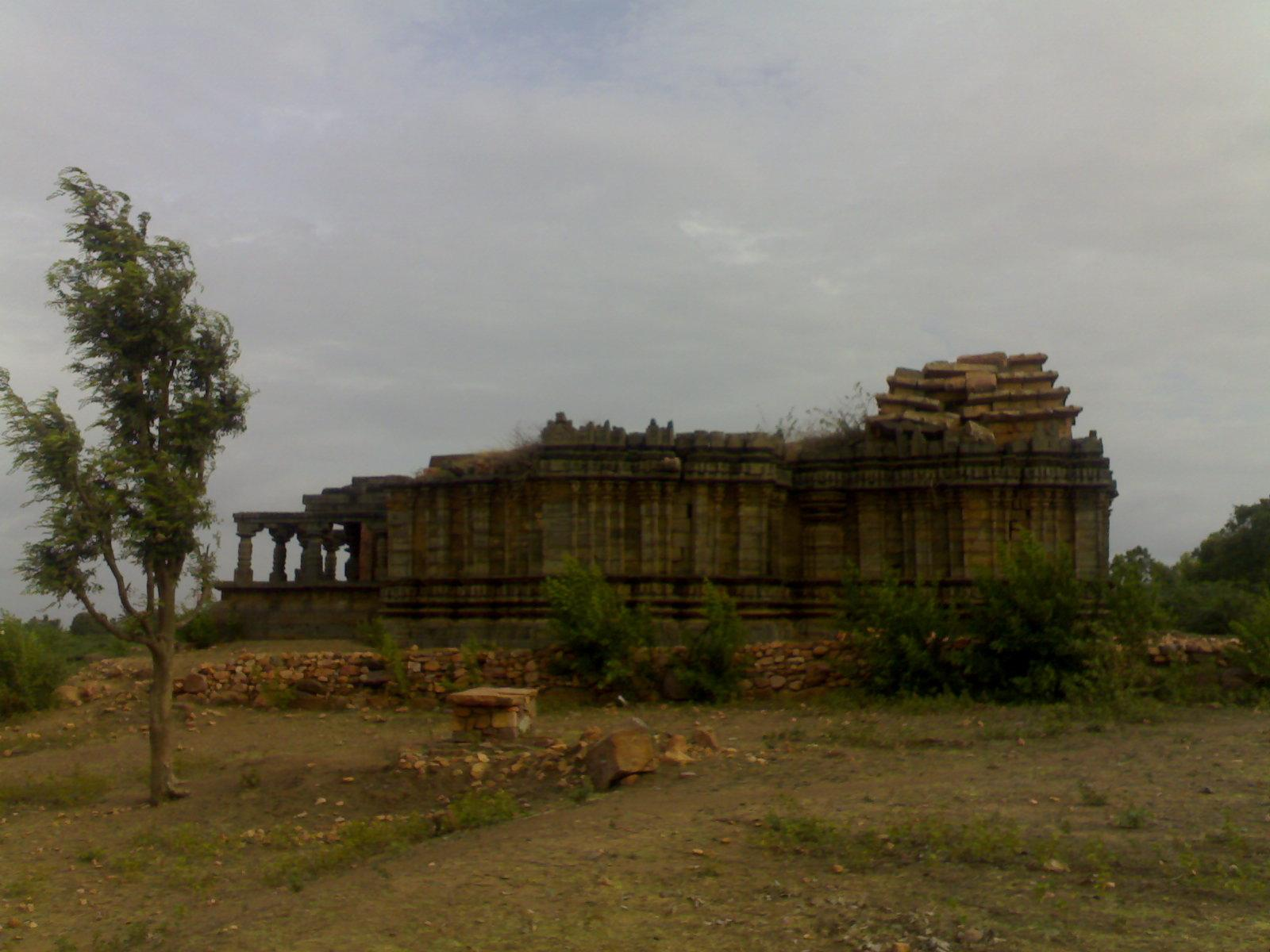
Ruined temple

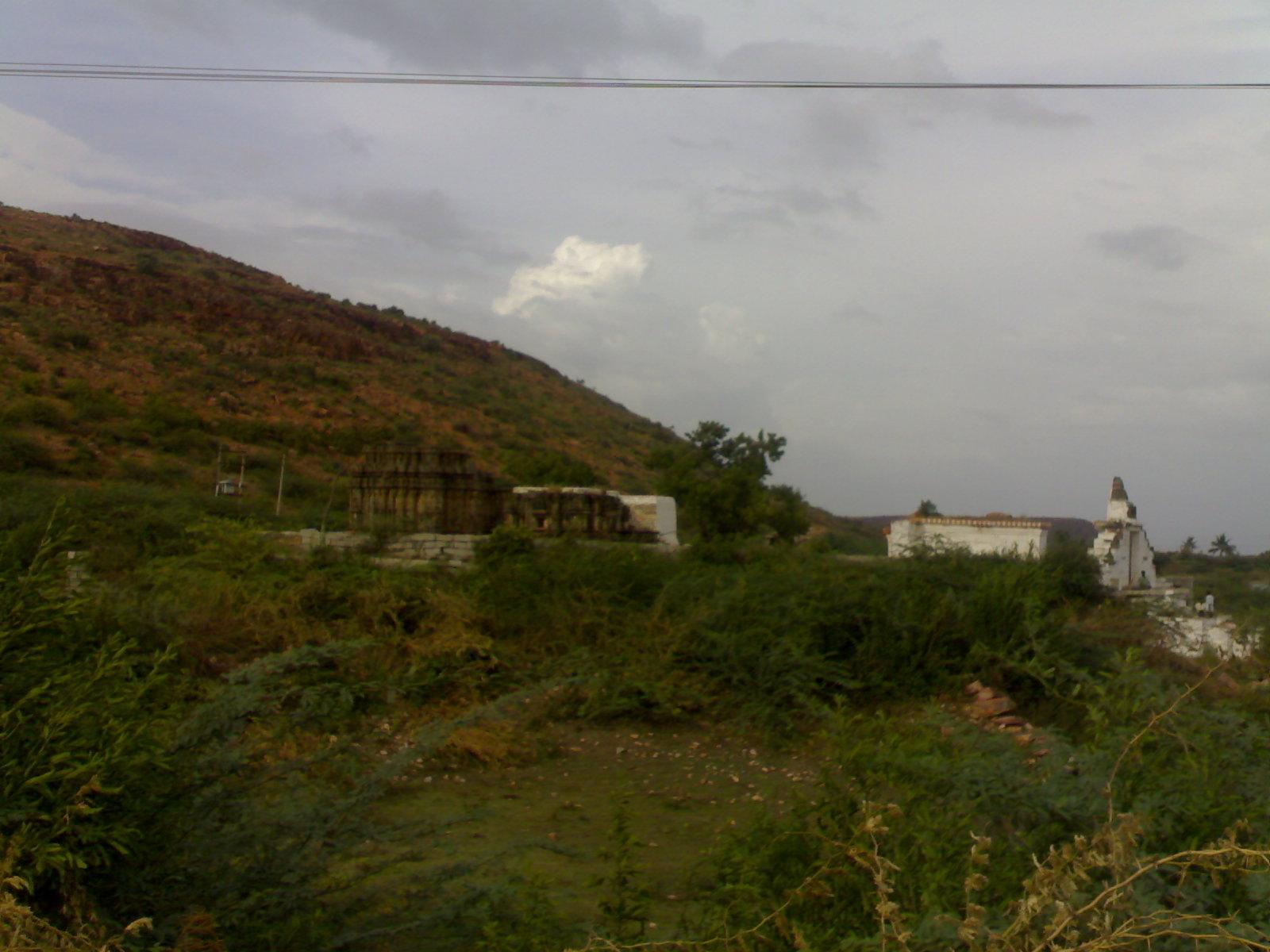
Ruined temple

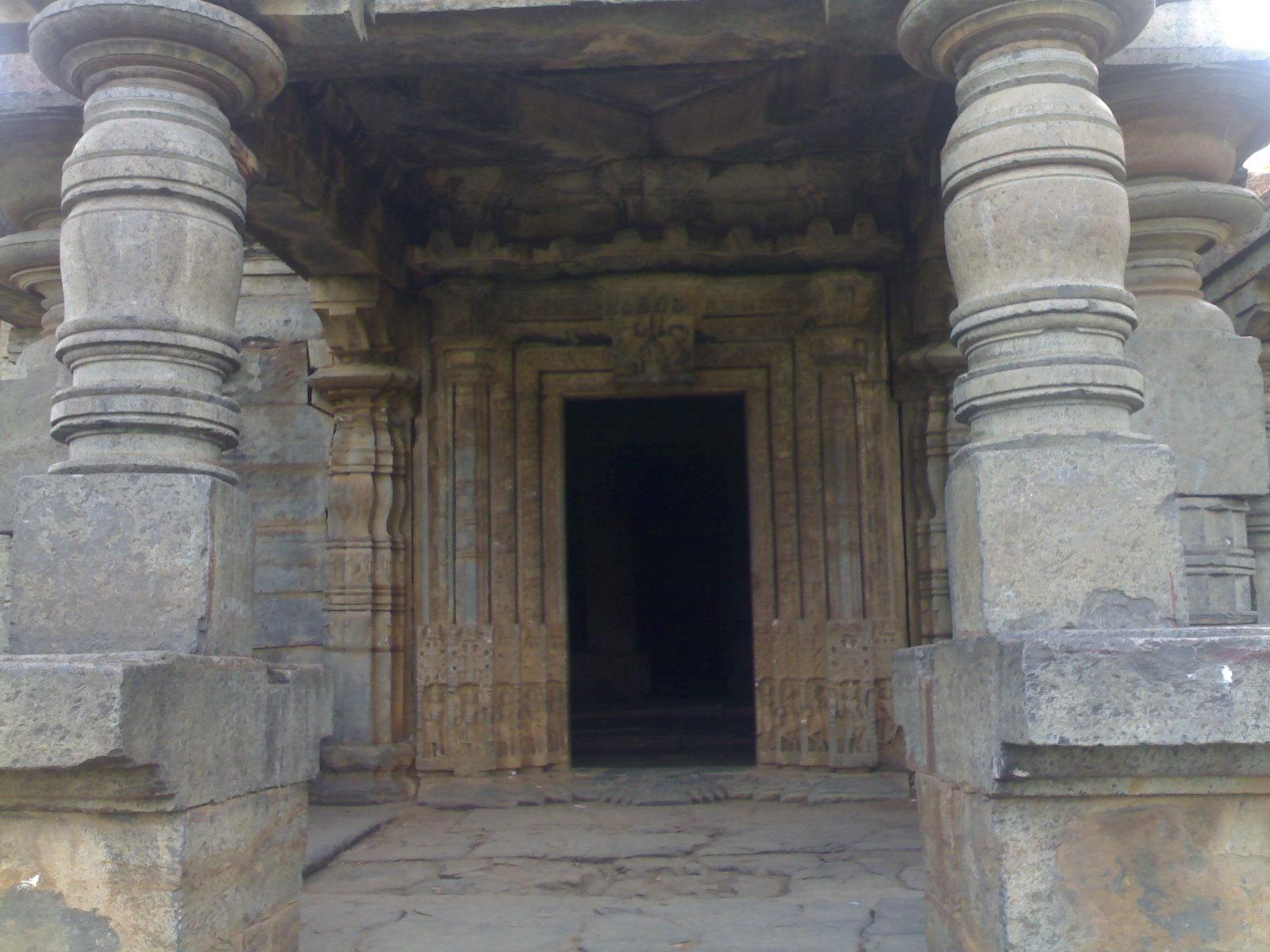
Ruined temple

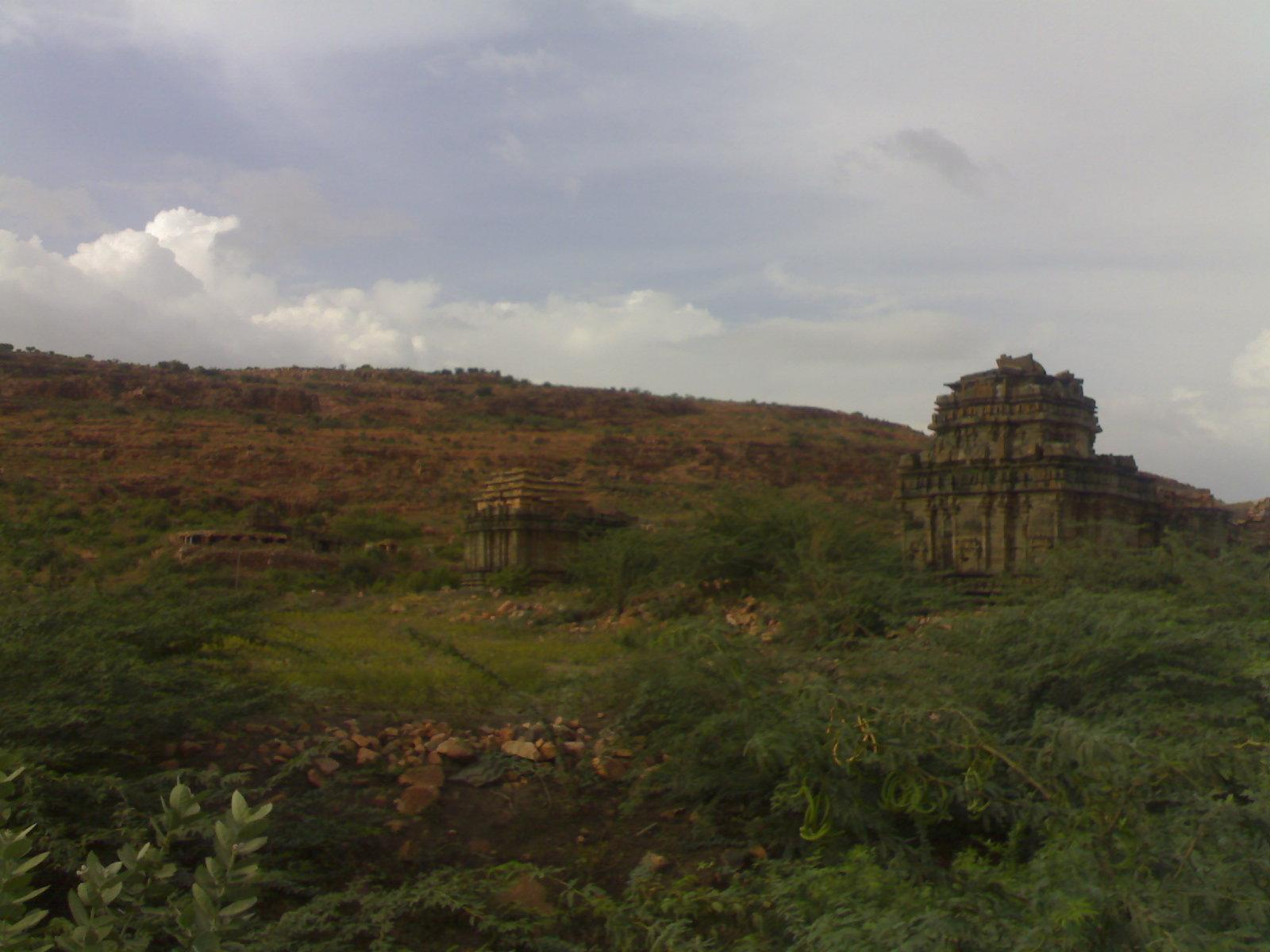
Ruined temple

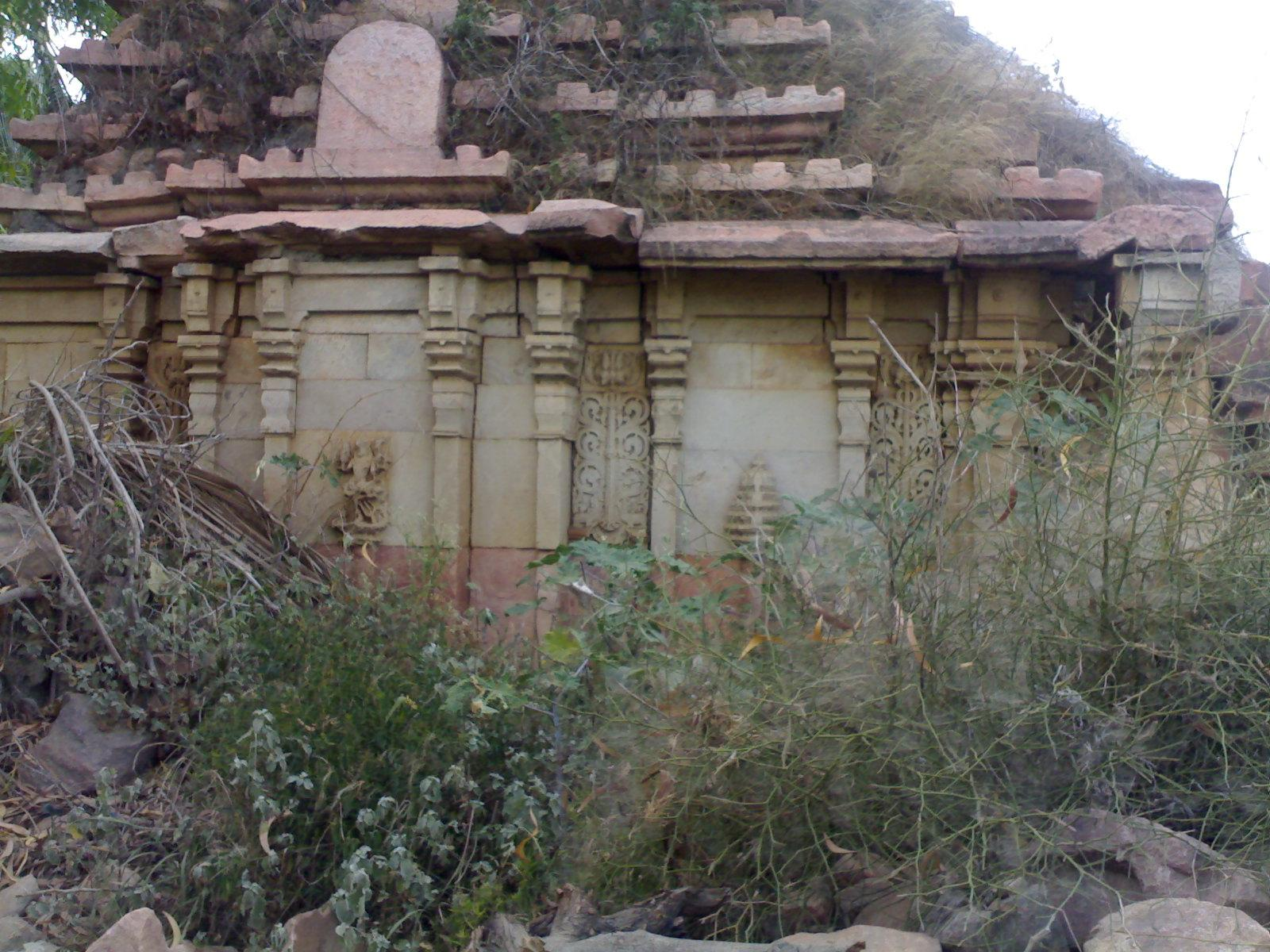
Ruined temple

== See also ==
- Western Chalukya
- Western Chalukya temples
- Western Chalukya architecture
- Saundatti
- Sogal
- Navilateertha
- Shirasangi
- Parasgad Fort
- Badami
- Aihole
- Pattadakal
- Ron, Karnataka
- North Karnataka
- Tourism in North Karnataka
