= Harugeri =

- Town Municipal Council
- Nickname: Educational capital of BELGAUM
- Location in Karnataka, India Harugeri (India)
- Coordinates: 16°31′01″N 74°56′59″E
- Country: India
- State: Karnataka
- District: BELGAUM
- Talukas: Raybag

Government
  - Type: Municipal corporation
  - Body: Nagar Palika
  - Rank: 1

Languages
  - Official: Kannada
- Time zone: UTC+5:30 (IST)
- Postal code: 591220
- Climate: Humid and summer (Köppen)

Harugeri (ಹಾರುಗೇರಿ) is a town (ಪಟ್ಟಣ ಪಂಚಾಯತ್) in Raybag tehsilin Belguam District of the Indian state of Karnataka.

== Dam ==
The Raja Lakhamagouda dam (Hidaka Dam) project supports this town with irrigation.

== Geography ==
Harugeri belongs to the Belguam division, and is located 113 km north from Belgaum, 21 km from Raybag and 567 km from state capital Bangaluru, and about 14 kilometers from the flowing Krishna River.

In 2015, Harugeri was recategorized from a village to a municipal town as a result of the 2011 census. It is the biggest Gram Panchayati in Karnataka and 2nd in the country (70+ members). Harugeri has a population of 28,755 inhabitants, including 5,567 families and 14,681 male & 14,073 female inhabitants. Kannada is the local language there.

== Religion ==
The town has many sacred places, of which Channavrushabendra Math (Leelamath) (Gramadevathe) is one of the most revered. Many pilgrims visit the place daily and every year the fair is held in October. The city is a religious cluster hosting many clans.

== Economy ==
Developed by irrigation, Harugeri is a major agricultural marketplace. It is the economically strongest town in its tehsil. It covers more than 110 square kilometres (42 sq mi), two-thirds of which are irrigated by the Ghataprabha project. Agriculture is the main occupation. The main crops are sugarcane, Maize, turmeric, grapes and wheat.

The city hosts agriculture-related businesses and venues such as the APMC and a number of sugarcane mills. Harugeri has around 70+ schools, including:

- Harugeri Vidyalaya School (HVEH)
- Sri Vrushabhendra Education society (SVES) school
- Janata Education society, Pragati High school & Bhagwan ITI
- Sri Karesiddeshwar School
- GOVT High school
- Vivekananda School
- SPM St Peters English medium school
- SVES arts/commerce/science & BBA BCA college (PUC & UG courses)
- HVEH arts/commerce/science (PUC & UG course)
- Sri Siddhivinayak Ayurvedic college (BAMS)

It is a central educational hub for nearby villages. The local government (Municipal council) with its 72 members is the biggest in Karnataka.

Infrastructure of Harugeri is featured by a vast number of different schools, colleges and various banks including a branch office of the State Bank of India and syndicate bank. The village has about 70+ doctors practicing medicines in various fields. Hospital however is in Miraj, a town about an hour from Harugeri and train station is 14 km (7.5 mi) away.

Harugeri has a very good retail market for farmers inside and around the town, hence it is also regarded as the economic capital of Raibag taluka.
