= Parasgad Fort =

Coordinates: 15°46′4.1″N 75°6′46.22″E

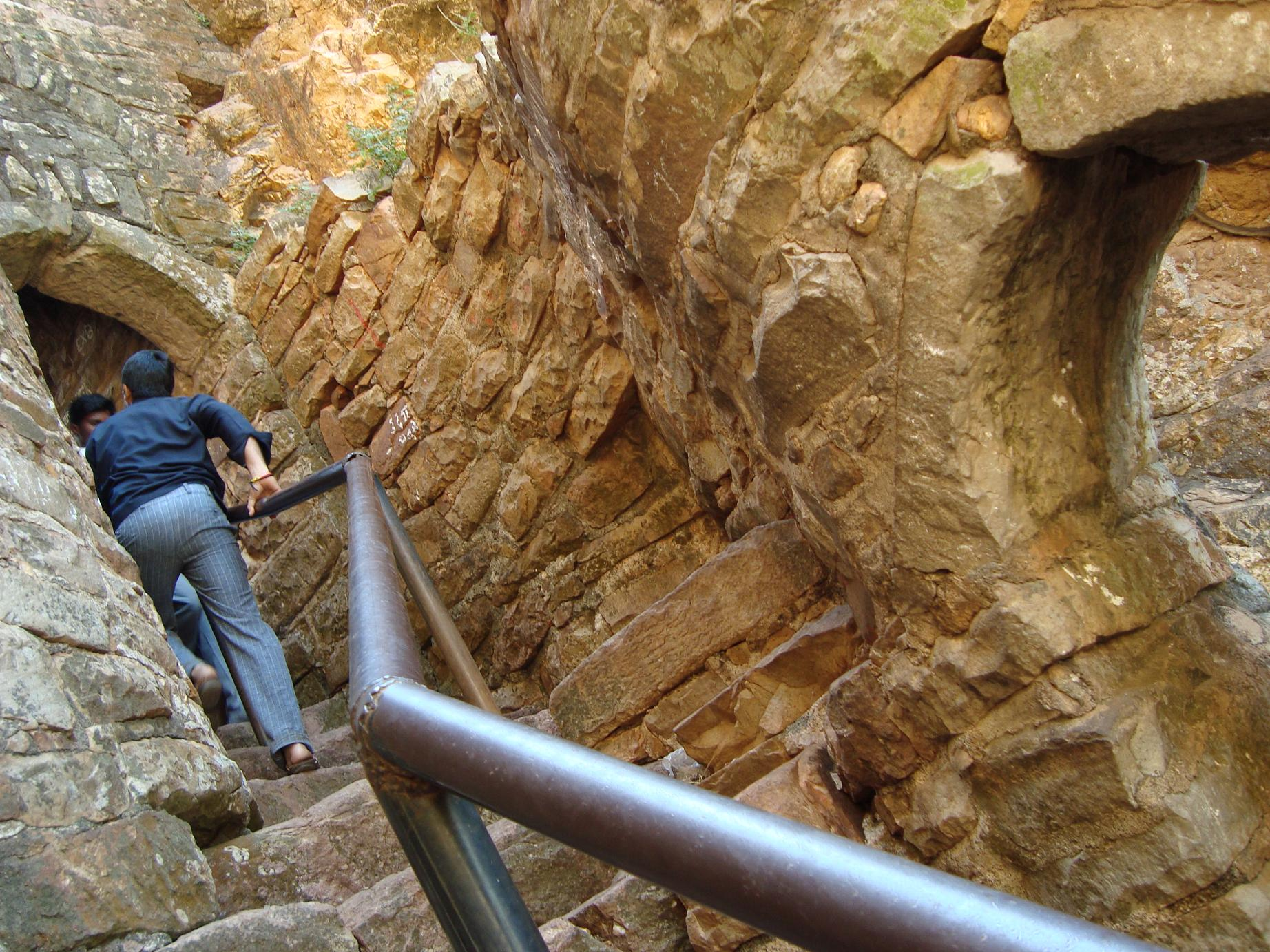
Parasgad Fort, Saundatti, North Karnataka

Parasgad Fort is a ruined hill fort in the Belgaum district of Karnataka state, India. magnificent fort of Parashghad, dating back to the 10th century and built by famous rulers of Ratta dynasty. Parasgad Fort is located about two kilometres south of Saundatti village, and stands on the south-west edge of a range of hills immediately overlooking the black soil plain down below.

The hill which measures about 500 metres (1,640 ft) from north to south and about 300 metres (984 ft) from east to west, is irregular, and a good deal is covered with prickly pear and brushwood. Its sides are rocky and almost perpendicular. A deep gorge runs through it.

Atop the hill-fort is a small ruined shrine to the Hindu deity Maruthi. The fort itself is uninhabited, and the remains of old houses are located in it.

A descent of several hundred steps leads to Yadravi village. This passes by a natural spring with a water tank measuring thirty by six metres called the Ramatheertha, and a cave housing statues of Hindu deities and mythological figures including Jamadagni, Parashurama, Rama, and Sita, a Shivalinga with a Nandi. The village of Yadravi is referred to as "Elarame" in an inscription found on a platform near the Bharamappa temple of the village. The inscription is dated Shaka 901 in the Hindu calendar.

== More images of the fort ==
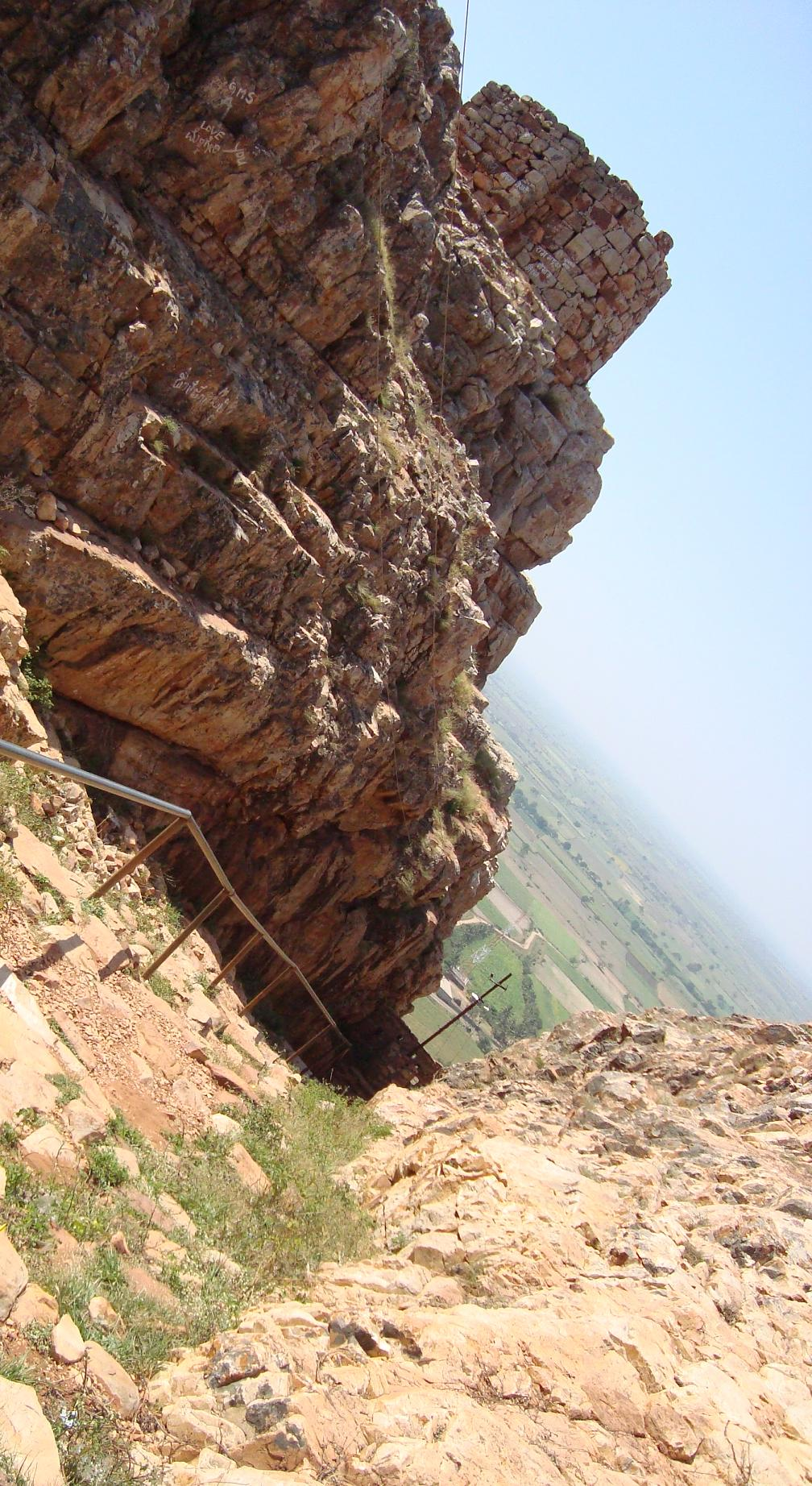
Parasgad Fort, Saundatti, Karnataka

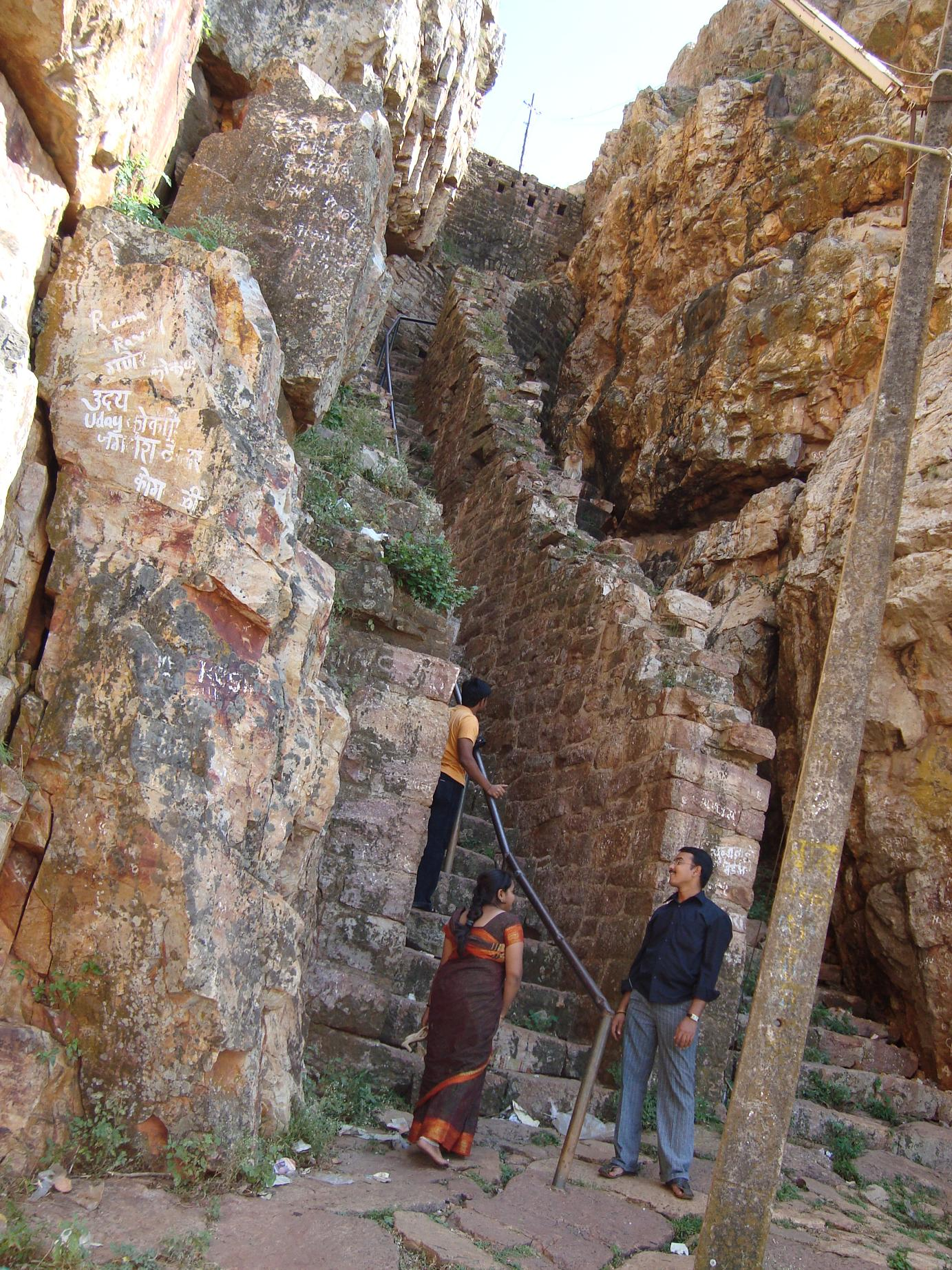
Parasgad Fort, Saundatti, Karnataka

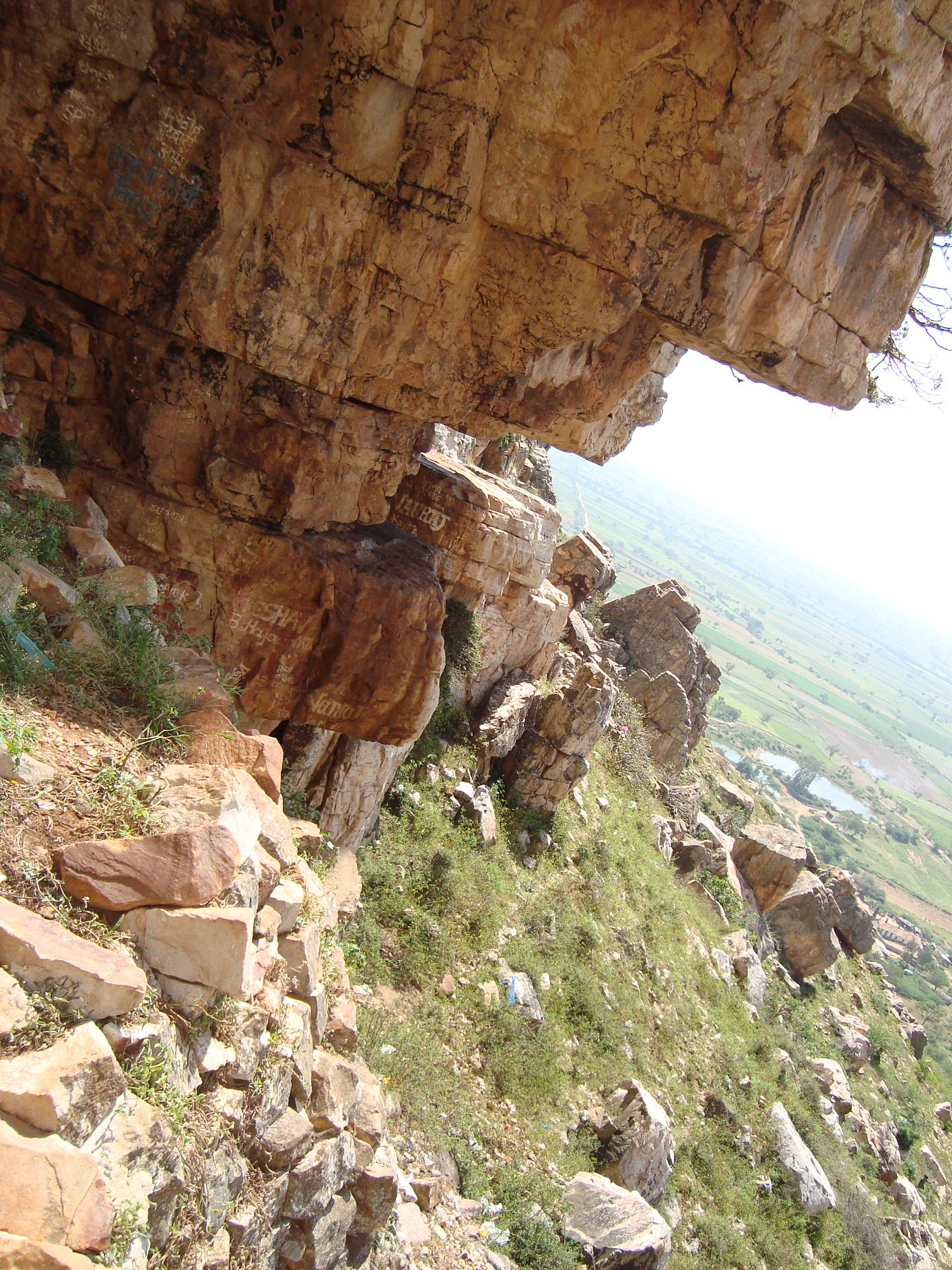
Parasgad Fort, Saundatti, Karnataka

== See also ==
- North Karnataka
- Tourism in North Karnataka
- Saundatti
- Hooli
- Shirasangi
- Navilateertha
- Sogal
