= Sattigeri =

- Village
- Location in Karnataka, India Sattigeri (India)
- Coordinates: 15.78°N 75.12°E
- Country: India
- State: Karnataka
- District: Belgaum
- Talukas: Saundatti

Population (2001)
  - Total: 5,611

Languages
  - Official: Kannada
- Time zone: UTC+5:30 (IST)

Sattigeri is a village in the southern state of Karnataka, India. It is located in the Saundatti taluk of Belgaum district in Karnataka.

== Demographics ==
As of 2001 India census, Sattigeri had a population of 5611 with 2863 males and 2748 females.

== See also ==
- Belgaum
- Districts of Karnataka
