= Inchal =

- Village
- Location in Karnataka, India Inchal (India)
- Coordinates: 15.78°N 75.12°E
- Country: India
- State: Karnataka
- District: Belgaum
- Talukas: Saundatti

Government
  - Type: Panchayat raj

Population (2001)
  - Total: 6,077

Languages
  - Official: Kannada
- Time zone: UTC+5:30 (IST)

Inchal is a village in the southern state of Karnataka, India. It is located in the Saundatti taluk of Belgaum district in Karnataka.

== Demographics ==
At the 2001 India census, Inchal had a population of 6077 with 3116 males and 2961 females, for a total population of 6077, living in 1044 houses. Kannada is the local language. The total area of Inchal is 3,106 hectares (7,680 acres).

== See also ==
- Belgaum
- Districts of Karnataka

In this village, most of the youngsters, or over 300 people, are serving in the Indian Army. Inchal is near by Bailhongal, and well cleaned city in the Belgaum district. Inchal is a village in Parasgad Taluk in Belgaum District of Karnataka, India. It belongs to the Belgaum Division. It is located 40 km (25 mi) east of the district headquarters in Belgaum, 25 km (16 mi) from Parasgad, and 512 km (318 mi) from State capital Bangalore

Inchal's Pin code is 591102 and its postal head office is Bailhongal.

Murakibhavi (6 km; 3.7 mi), Chachadi (7 km; 4.3 mi), Bailwad (7 km; 4.3 mi), Nesargi (9 km; 5.6 mi), and Anigol (10 km; 6.2 mi) are nearby villages. Inchal is surrounded by Parasgad Taluk towards the east, Gokak Taluk to the north, Belgaum Taluk to the west, and Khanapur Taluk to the west.

Saundatti-Yellamma, Belgaum, Gokak, Dharwad are the nearby cities to Inchal.

== How to Reach Inchal ==
Bail Hongal is the nearest town to Inchal, 6 km (3.7 mi) away by road. The Belgaum Railway Station is 39 km (24 mi) away.
