= Karikatti =

Coordinates: 15°44′N 75°02′E

- Village
- Interactive map of Karikatti
- Country: India
- State: Karnataka
- District: Belgaum
- Talukas: Savadatti

Languages
  - Official: Kannada
- Time zone: UTC+5:30 (IST)

Karikatti is a village in Belgaum district in Karnataka, India.
