= Teggihal =

Coordinates: 15°52′N 75°08′E

- Village
- Location in Karnataka, India
- Country: India
- State: Karnataka
- District: Belagavi

Languages
  - Official: Kannada
- Time zone: UTC+5:30 (IST)
- Postal code: 583278

Teggihal is a village in Saundatti taluk, Belagavi district of Karnataka, India.
