= Almansa Dam =

Dam in Albacete, Spain

Almansa Dam is located in Albacete, on the Vega de Belén River. It is purported to be the world's oldest Masonry gravity dam, which is still in use, and the tenth-oldest dam. Estimated to have been built in the 16th century by Muslim rulers of Spain or in the 14th century, the dam sits 82 feet high, 295 feet long, with a 7500 cubic yard volume, and 1300 acre feet reservoir capacity. Almansa dam holds floodwater and is used to provide irrigation. The City of Almansa owns the dam.
