= Renuka Sagara =

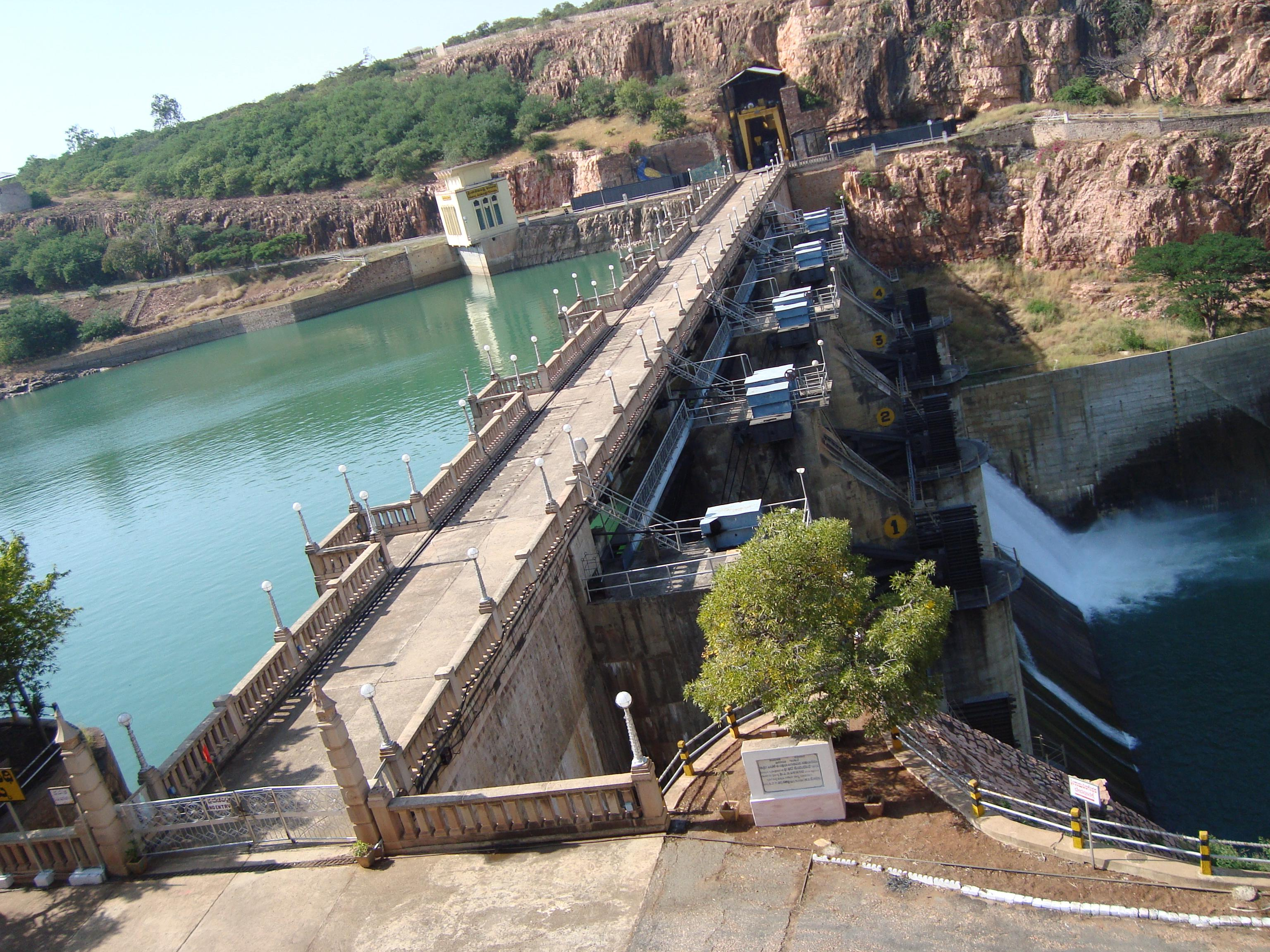
- Location: Navilatirtha, Savadatti Taluk, Belagavi district, Karnataka, India
- Opening date: 1972 AD

Dam and spillways
- Impounds: Malaprabha River
- Height: 141.50 ft (43.13 m)
- Length: 464.239 ft (141.500 m)

Reservoir
- Total capacity: 37.73 Tmcft

Renuka Sagara, also known as Malaprabha reservoir and Navilutheertha reservoir, is a dam and impounding reservoir constructed across the Malaprabha River in the Krishna River basin. It is situated at Navilatirtha village in Savadatti Taluk Taluk of Belagavi district in North Karnataka, India. The dam is 43.13 metres high and has 4 vertical crest gates; it impounds a large reservoir with a gross surface area of 54.97 square kilometres, and storage capacity of 37.73 thousand million cubic feet. It is an earthen and masonry dam which caters to the irrigation needs for over 1,961.30 square kilometres (484,650 acres), and hydroelectric power generation.

== See also ==
- List of dams and reservoirs in Karnataka
