= Shri Kalika Devi Temple =

Hindu temple in Karnataka, India

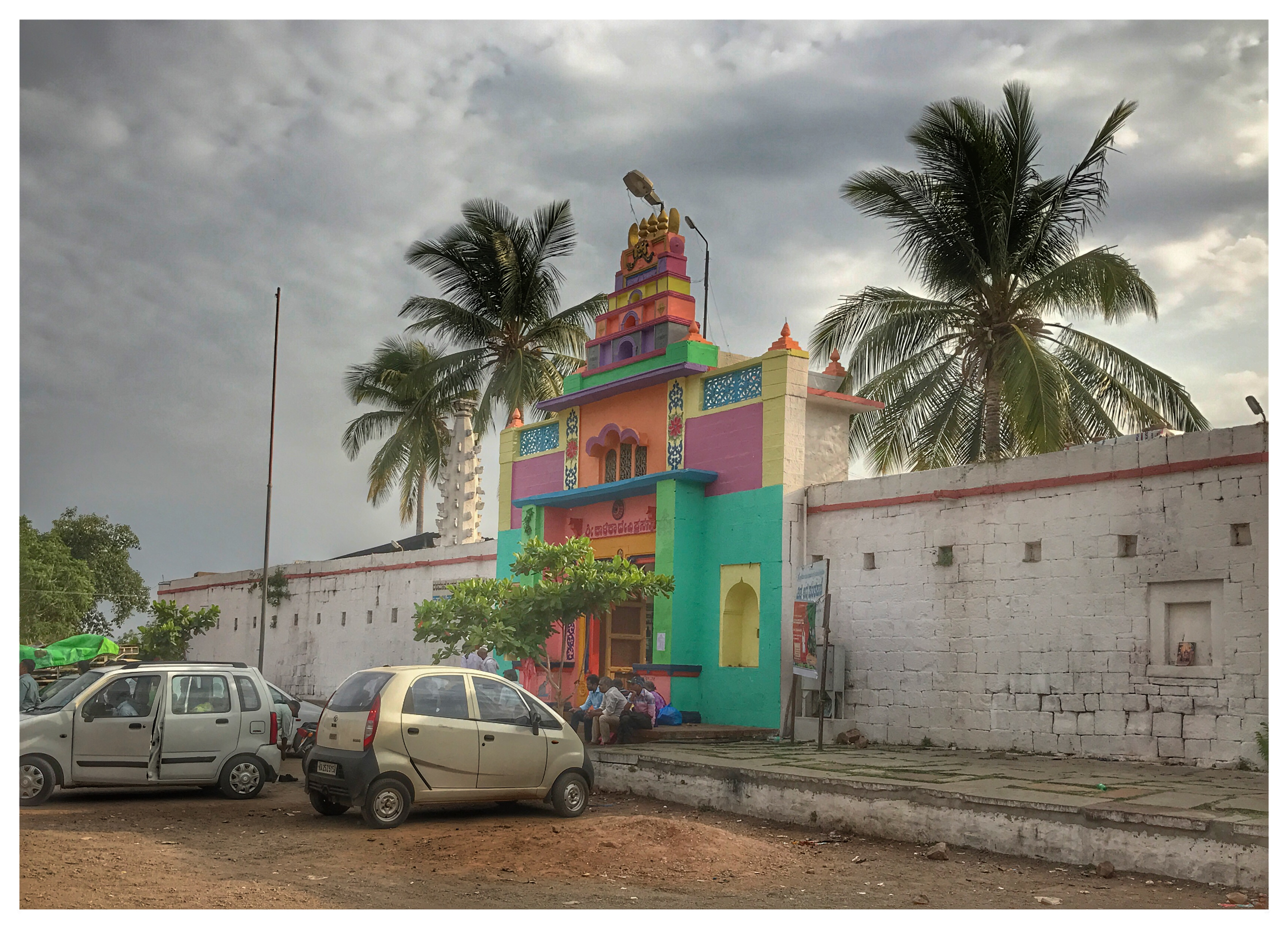
- Front view of the present Kalika Temple

- Location in Karnataka

Religion
- Affiliation: Hinduism
- District: Belgaum
- Festivals: Ugadi, Vishwakarma Mahotsava

Location
- Location: Sirasangi
- State: Karnataka
- Country: India
- Interactive map of Shri Kalika Devi Temple
- Coordinates: 15°51′N 75°15′E

Architecture
- Completed: 1st Century

Kalika Devi Temple is a Hindu temple in Belgaum, Karnataka dedicated to Shaktism.

== History ==
The place name is mentioned as Rishishringapura, Pirishingi, or Hirishingi in two records from the same place dated 1148 of Jagadekamalla and another dated 1186 of Someshwara IV. It was a noted commercial center.

As per the studies conducted by the department of archaeology, the temple of Shri Kalika Devi in Sirsangi might have been constructed during the first century. Sirsangi is a place which is prominent in Karnataka and this is due to the monuments and temples in and around this small village. Earlier this place was known as Pirising but later, during the Medieval era, the name was changed as Hirisingi.

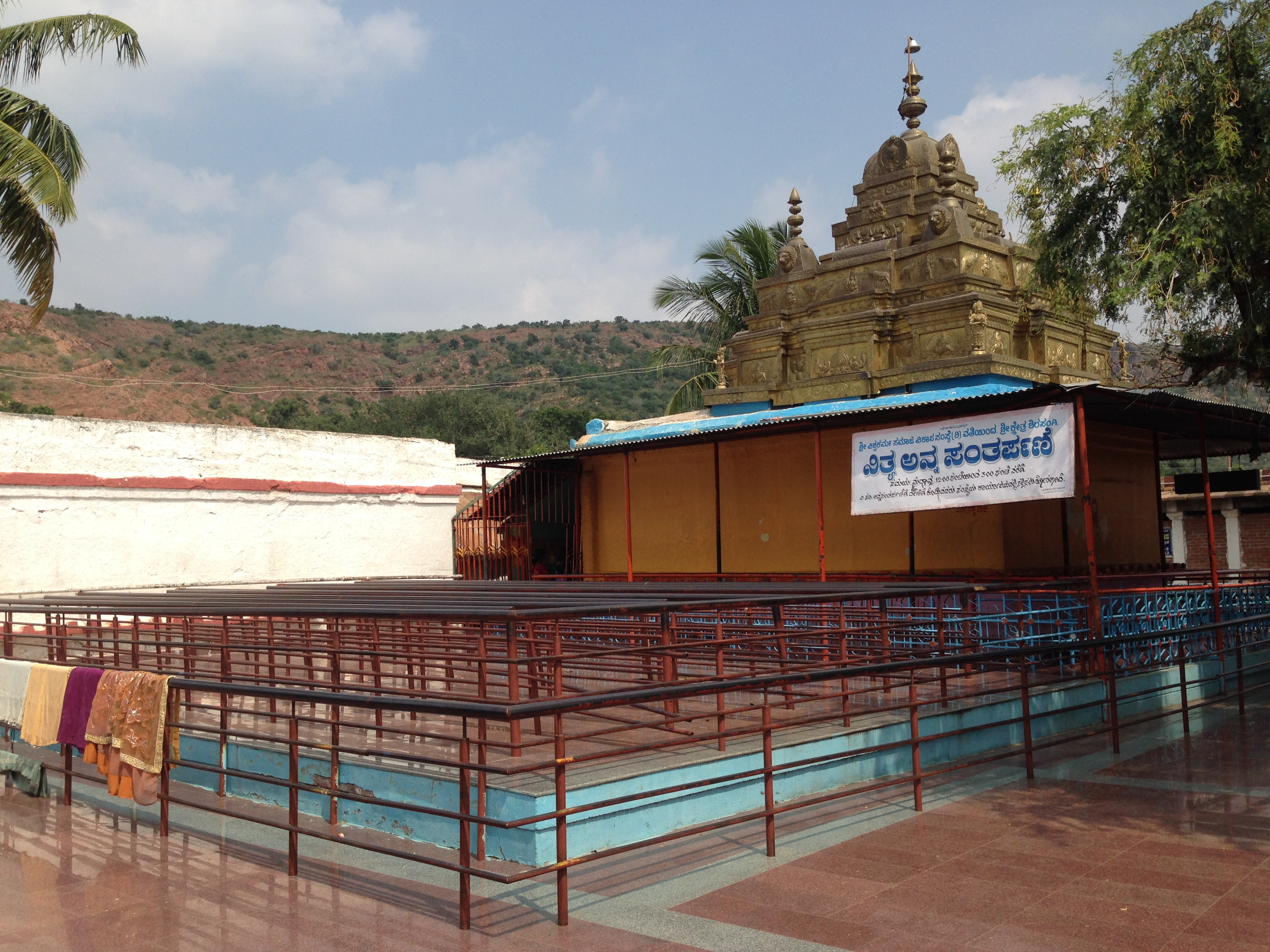
Inside View of Temple.

== Mythology ==
The temple of Shri Kalika Devi in Sirsangi is of mythological significance as its name is mentioned in many Hindu mythologies.

One such myth mentions that a saint by the name of Vrushya Shrunga was involved in penance in Vrushya Shrunga Tapovan, which is currently the place where the temple of Shri Kalika Devi is present. However, demons like Narundasur (Naragunda), Bettasura (Betasur) and Nalundasur (Navalagund) disturbed his meditation. Then the goddesses Chikkumbasura (Chikkumbi) and Hirekumbasura (Hirekumbi) killed these demons heeding the pleas of the ascetic Vrushya Shrunga. The goddesses later settled down here and hence the temple of Shri Kalika Devi was erected in Shirasangi.

== Geography ==
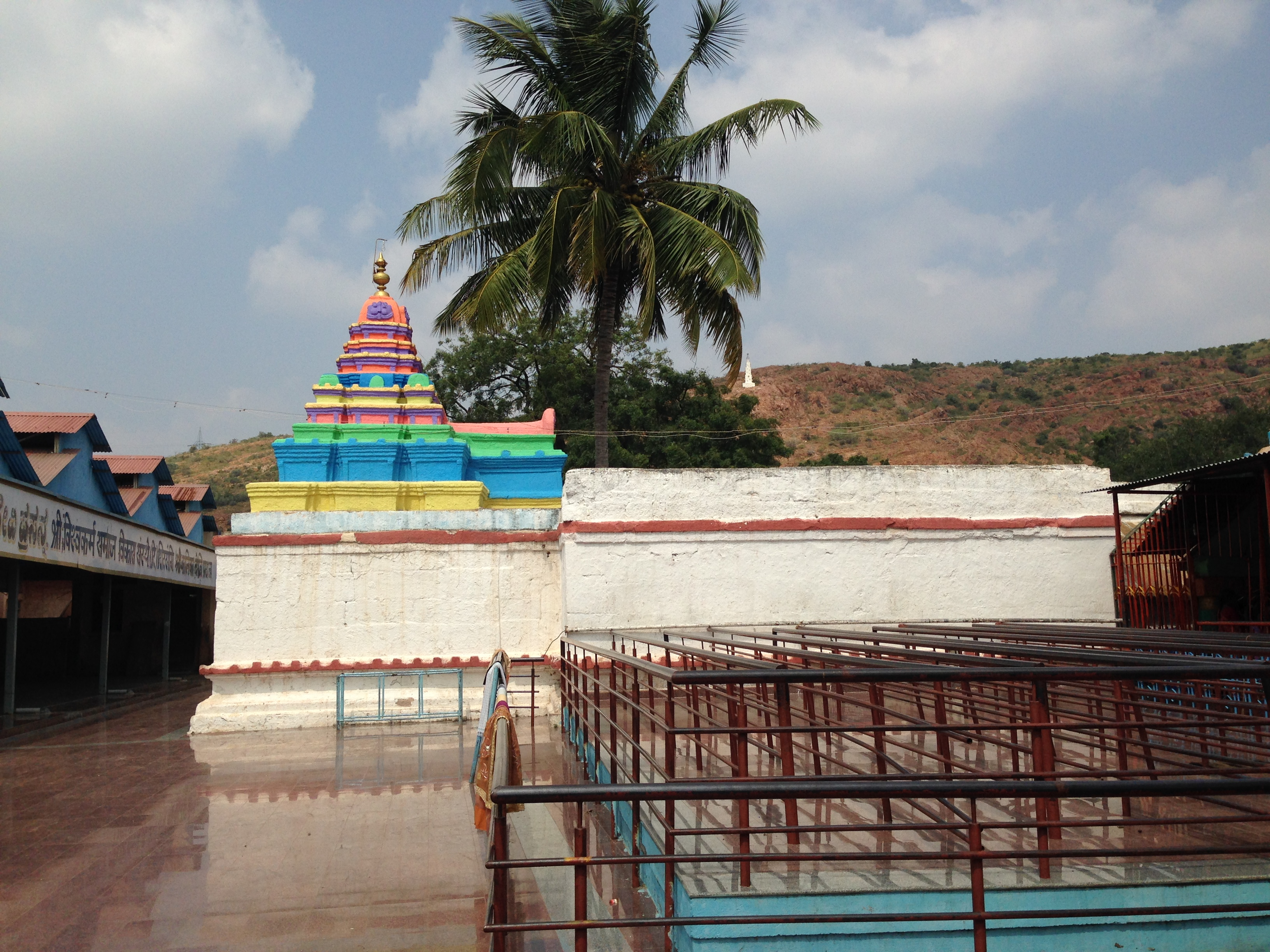
Inside View of Temple.

There are two small hillocks at the outskirts of the village, one having a cave locally called Maunappanagavi and the hillock is called Kalluru Gudda ("kallu" in Kannada language ಕಲ್ಲು means stone, Ooru ಊರು means town) . Inside the cave is a hill which can accommodate about 200 people; after this is a six-meter-long passage leading to a small pit having water. Another hillock near Kalika temple has a cave locally called Siddeshwaragavi, approachable by climbing nearly 200 steps and inside the cave there is a Shivalinga.

== Worship ==
Depending upon devotees' pledges, they put jaggery, wheat, coconuts, rice, edible oil, etc. equivalent to their weight in Tulaa Bhara Seva.

Anna Dasoha seva is also a part of worship.

== Temple activities ==
Many devotees, to complete their vows and pledges on their behalf or on behalf of their family members and also to follow traditional vows.

== Festivals ==
=== Ugadi ===
Ugadi is one of the major festivals celebrated by Vishwakarmas of this region. The Vishwakarma Samaj Vikas Samsthe organizes religious and cultural programmes on the Amavasya(Dark-moon Day). Devotees offer wheat grown in their fields to the goddess. The famous "Butti" ritual is performed during the early hours of the Padyami.

=== Halegodi Amavasya ===
Halegodi Amavasya is celebrated next to Ugadi Amavasya.

=== Vishwakarma Mahotsava ===
This is grandly celebrated on Chatti Amavasya every year.

== Transportation ==
=== Road ===
The Kalika Devi temple at Sirsangi is 62 km from Dharwad and is on the Dharwad–Bijapur route. It is around 2 km from the bus stand at Sirsangi.

=== Air ===
The nearest airport is Belgaum which is around 100 km and Hubli around 72 km from Shri Kalika Devi Temple at Sirsangi.

=== Rail ===
The nearest railway stations is located at Hubli and Belgaum. There are daily trains which connect other spots in Karnataka.
