= Lingayat Education Association =

- Dharwad, India, Karnataka

District information
- Established: 1883

Lingayat Education Association is an education institution that was established by Rao Bahadur Gurusiddappa V. Gilaganchi and Rao Bahadur Rudragouda Artal in 1883 at Dharwad.

== Colleges ==
- Lingayat Education Association's Homeopathic Medical College and Hospital, Dharwad
- Lingayat Education Association's Awwappanna Attigeri ITI, Dharwad
