= Ammanagi =

- Village
- Location in Karnataka, India Ammanagi (India)
- Coordinates: 16.29°N 74.60°E
- Country: India
- State: Karnataka
- District: Belgaum
- Talukas: Hukeri

Population (2001)
  - Total: 5,488

Languages
  - Official: Kannada
- Time zone: UTC+5:30 (IST)
- Postal code: 591236

Ammanagi is a village in the southern state of Karnataka, India. It is located in the Hukeri taluk of Belgaum district in Karnataka.

There is a Jain temple of Parshvanatha belonging to 10th or 11th century.

== Demographics ==
As of 2001 India census, Ammanagi had a population of 5488 with 2832 males and 2656 females.

== See also ==
- Belgaum
- Districts of Karnataka
