= Masonry dam =

Type of dam

A masonry dam is a dam made out of masonry – mainly stone and brick, sometimes joined with mortar. They are either the gravity or the arch-gravity type.

The largest masonry dam in the World is Nagarjuna Sagar Dam, Andhra Pradesh and Telangana, in India.

== Visual examples ==
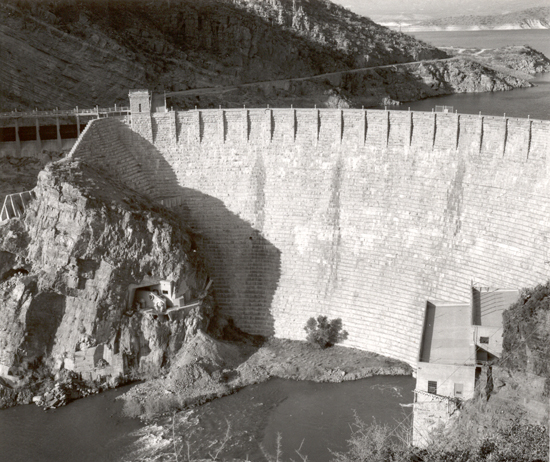
The original Theodore Roosevelt Dam in Arizona

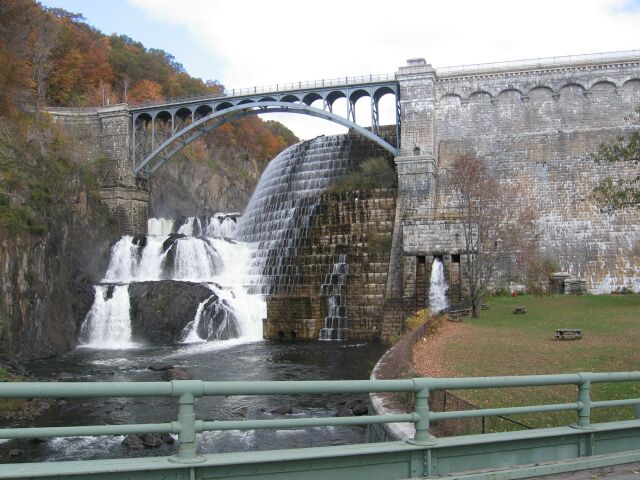
New Croton Dam in New York

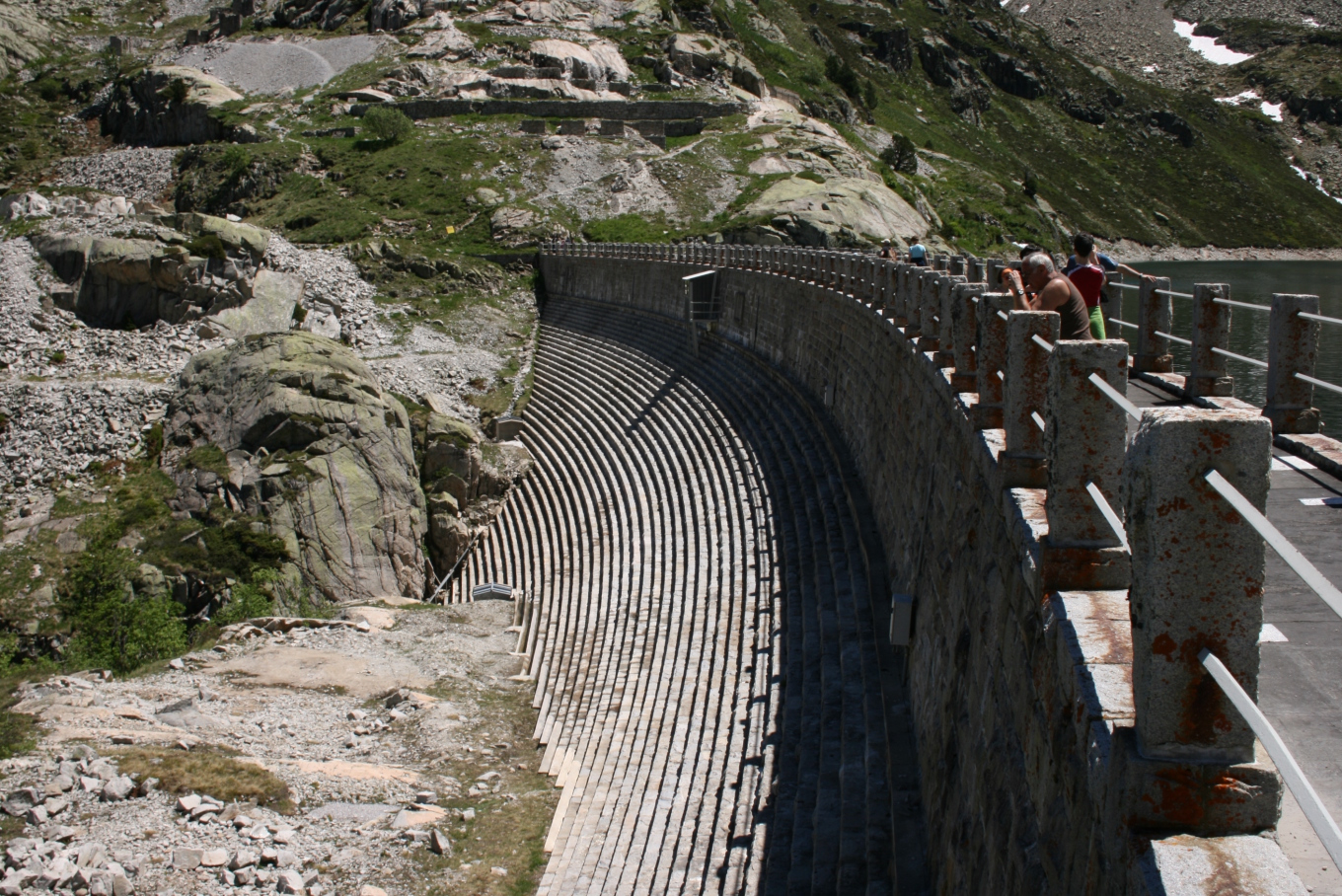
The Artouste Dam in France

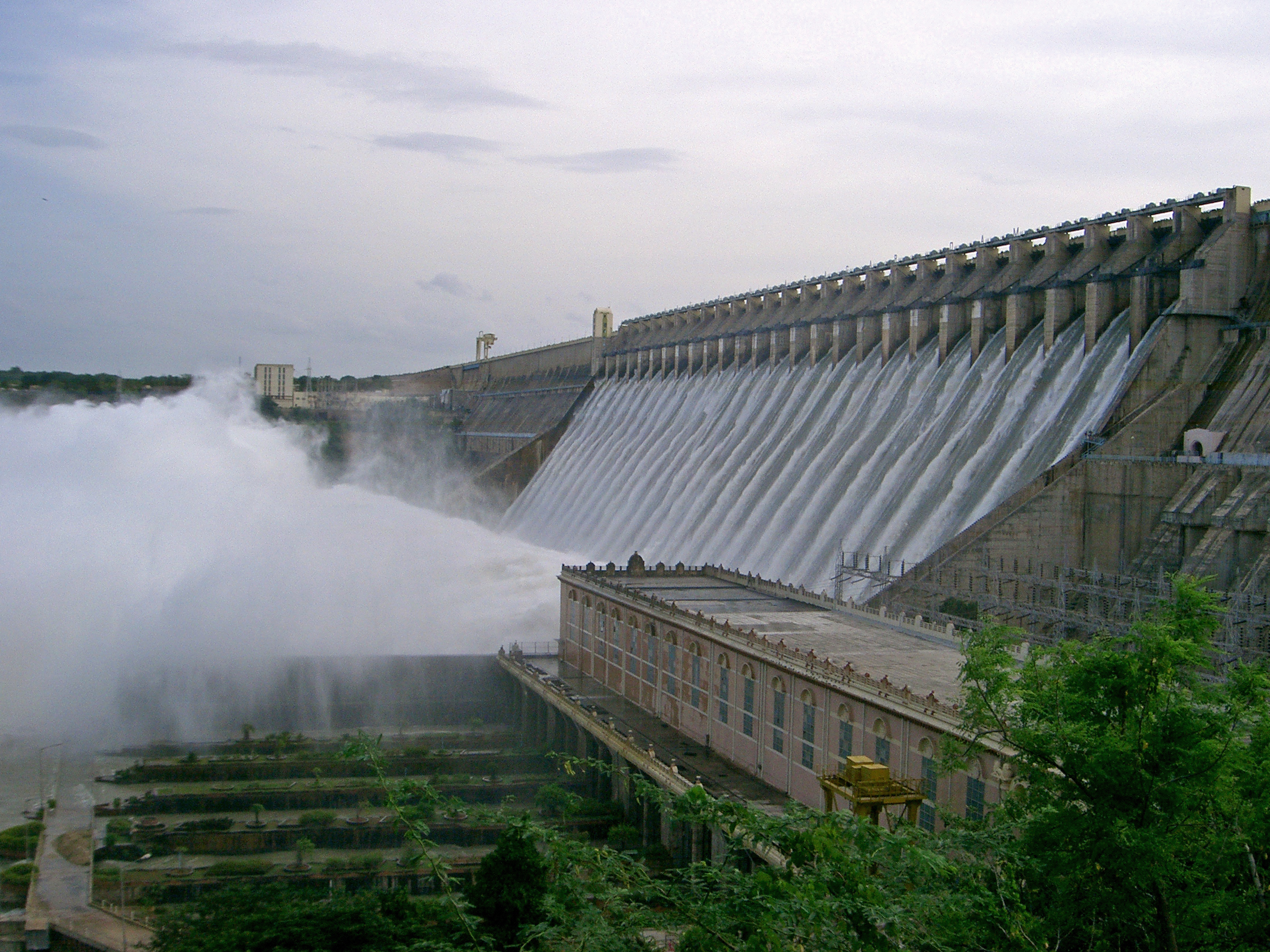
The Nagarjuna Sagar Dam in India is the largest masonry dam in the world

== See also ==
- Arch-gravity dam
- Causeway
- Dam
- Gravity dam
- Retaining wall
- Wicket dam
