= Wicket dam =

Type of dam

A wicket dam, Chanoine wicket movable dam, or barrage à hausse mobile is a movable barrier across the width of a river that is used to hold up water and allow navigation under low-water conditions. When the wickets are lowered during high-water conditions, the river flow is unimpeded. A navigation lock is usually constructed alongside the wicket dam. The wicket dam was invented in the 19th century by Jacques Henri Chanoine, an engineer in the French Corps des ponts et chaussées.

Construction of wicket dams primarily occurred in the late 19th and early 20th centuries. William Price Craighill completed the first of the moveable wicket dams built in the United States, after visiting France to study their use. A Chanoine wicket movable dam. was constructed by William Emery Merrill at Davis's Island, 5½ miles below Pittsburgh. From 1875 until the turn of the century, the United States Army Corps of Engineers constructed a series of 53 wicket dams to canalize the Ohio River to meet the demands of year-round navigation. In the 1950s, the Corps undertook the Ohio River Navigation Modernization Program to replace the obsolete system of wicket dams and small locks.

== Design ==
The wicket dam is constructed from numerous movable planks or wickets that can be raised when needed, and lowered to the stream bed when not in use. Wickets were usually constructed using wooden planks, but could also be constructed from entirely from concrete and steel

== Examples of wicket dams ==
- Olmsted Locks and Dam
- Peoria Lock and Dam
- La Grange Lock and Dam
