= Sogal =

Place in Belgaum district, Karnataka, India

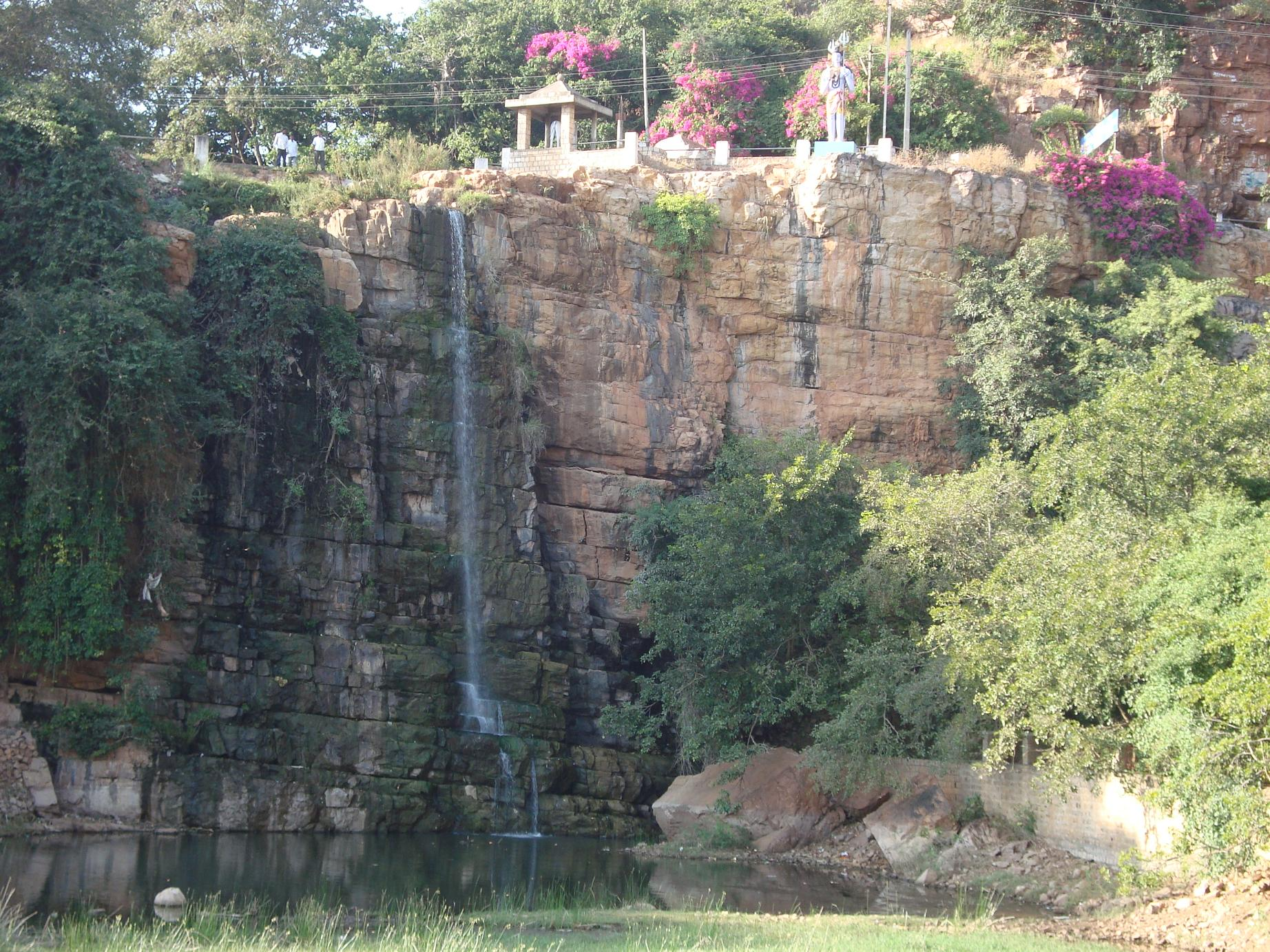
Sogal, near Munavalli and Saundatti, Karnataka

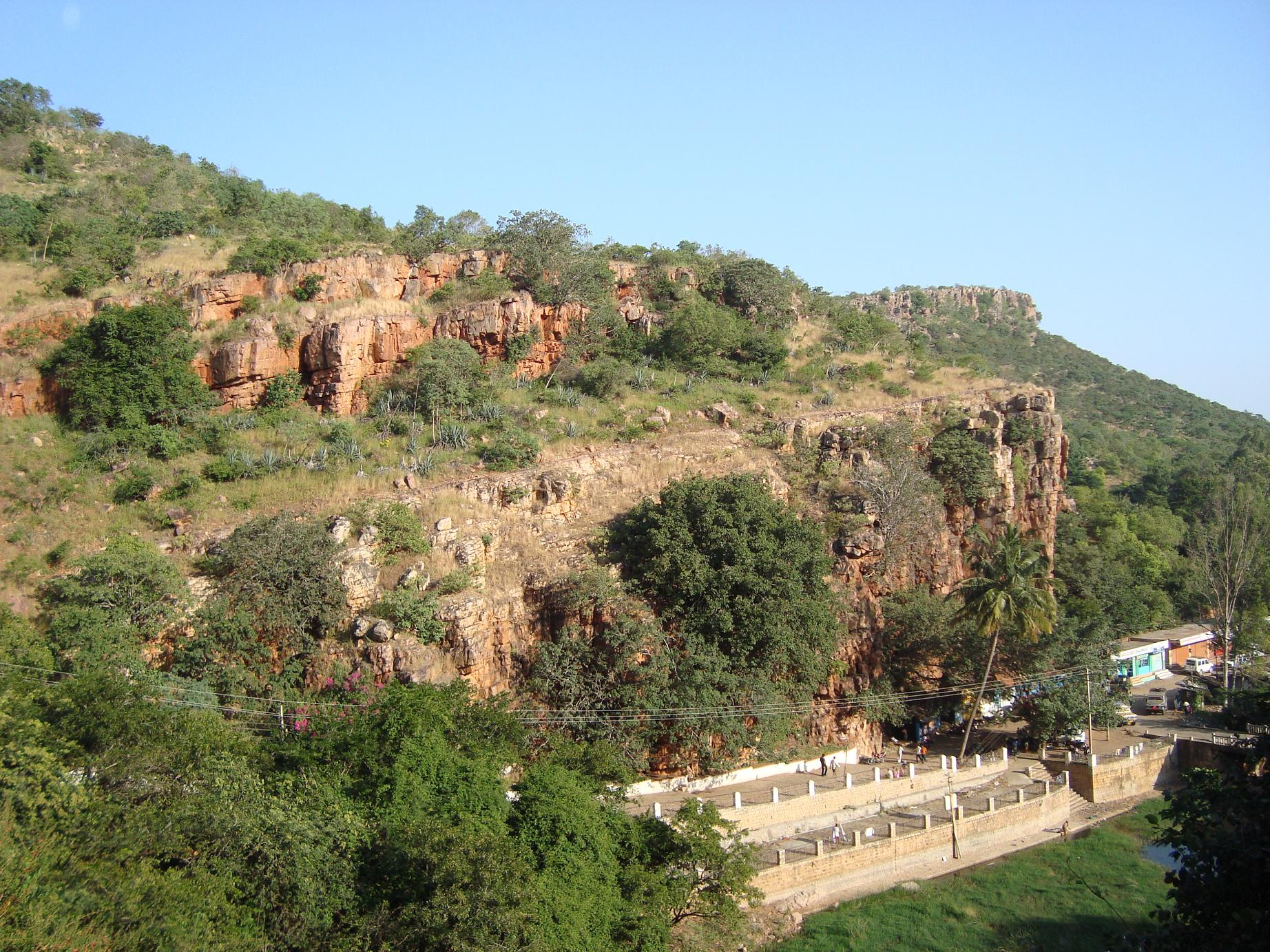
Sogal, near Munavalli and Saundatti, Karnataka

Sogal is a place in Belgaum district, Karnataka, India. Its name is ascribed to a sage, Sugola Muni, who is believed to have lived in the area, but one inscription speaks of "Sovala." Located on a hillside, Sogal has many temples, including the Someshwara temple, and is of great antiquarian interest.

Local folklore states that tigers came to Sogal to listen to the religious teachings. Other legends include a nearby Kalyanmantapa (temple), now renovated, where the marriage of Shiva and Parvati is said to have taken place. There is an old statue of Panchanana Shiva and Parvati, Shiva with basinga and other traditional ornaments. There are Ashtadikpalakas (statues of gods) in this area, such as Yama, Agni, Ishanya and Indra. These artifacts are examples of the artistic accomplishments of the period.

On the hill to the east of Sogal is an old fortification, now in ruins, locally referred to as Kadambarayan Kote — perhaps named after Kadamba King. To the east of this temple is the Ajjappana Gudi and a stone Surya-Chandra shrine. Near the Someshwara temple there is a small shrine called Girija Temple, but the building is in a dilapidated condition.

== See also ==
- North Karnataka
- Tourism in North Karnataka
- Saundatti
- Hooli
- Parasgad Fort
