= Hidkal =

- Village
- Location in Karnataka, India Hidkal (India)
- Coordinates: 16°08′11″N 74°39′17″E
- Country: India
- State: Karnataka
- District: Belgaum
- Taluku: Raybag

Languages
  - Official: Kannada
- Time zone: UTC+5:30 (IST)

Hidkal is a village in Belgaum district in the southern state of Karnataka, India.

Hidkal dam is built around the Dhupdal weir (a low dam built across a stream to raise its level or divert its flow), a 70 km-long-canal built by the British in 1897. The first phase of the irrigation project was intended to irrigate around 45,000 hectares of land.

The Hidkal reservoir across the Ghataprabha river in Hidkal village and 40 km of the canal length were built in the second phase. After the third phase, the project aims to irrigate 3.3 lakh hectares of land with a total capacity of 51.16 tmcft of water. Now, after a drought of three seasons, its total storage has been reduced to 6 tmcft, including dead storage of around 2 tmcft.

Every year, 2 tcmft of drinking water is released from Hidkal to Bagalkot.

Hidkal also beautiful gardens, nurseries. The Hunnur inspection Bungalow on bank of backwater and hunnur fort are attractions.

HDP High School is one of the schools located there.
