= Navilatirtha =

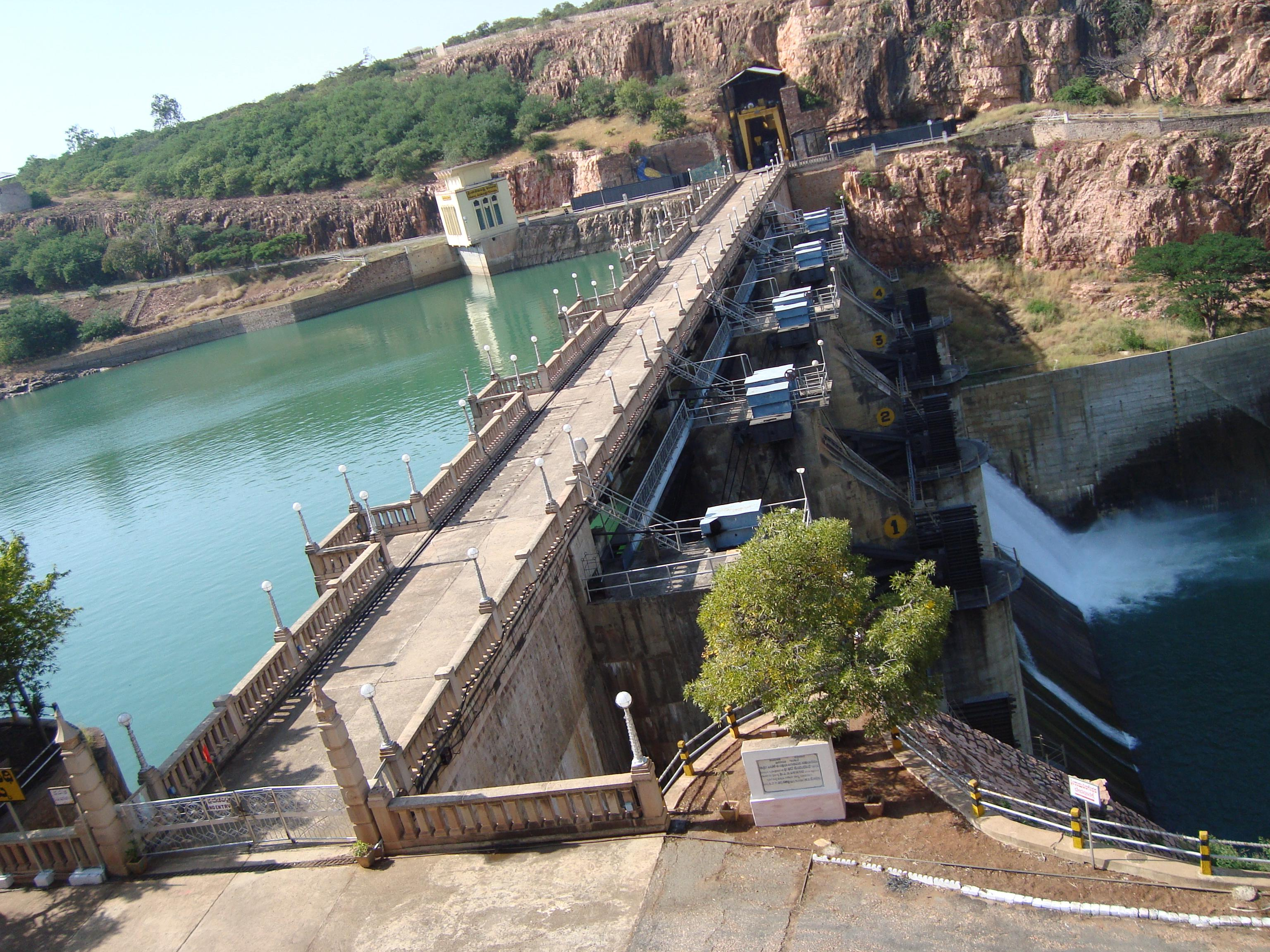
Navilateertha Dam, near Saundatti, Karnataka

Naviluteertha is a village in Savadatti taluk of Belagavi district, Karnataka, India. It is a well-known picnic spot. The place derives its name as so many peafowls are found here. It has a dam (called Renuka Sagara or Naviluteertha Dam or Malaprabha Dam) that was built in 1974 across Malaprabha river. This is the shortest dam in Karnataka with a height of 155 m and 41 m length with four gates.
