= Saundatti =

Savadatti Saundatti
- Town
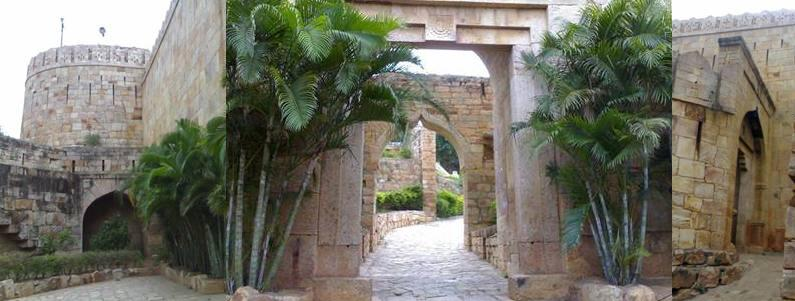
- Savadatti Fort

- Location in Karnataka, India
- Coordinates: 15.7833°N 75.1167°E
- Country: India
- State: Karnataka
- District: Belagavi

Government
  - Body: Town Municipal Council

Area
  - Town: 16 km^{2} (6.2 sq mi)
  - Rural: 1,555.27 km^{2} (600.49 sq mi)
- Elevation _at hilltop: 858 m (2,815 ft)

Population (2011)
  - Town: 41,215
  - Density: 2,600/km^{2} (6,700/sq mi)
  - Rural: 311,714

Language
  - Official: Kannada
- Time zone: UTC+5:30 (IST)
- PIN: 591 126
- Telephone code: 08330
- ISO 3166 code: IN-KA
- Vehicle registration: KA-24
- Website: www.saundattitown.mrc.gov.in

Savadatti is one of the oldest towns in Belagavi district in the Indian state of Karnataka. It is a Hindu pilgrimage centre, 78 kilometres from Belagavi and 41 kilometres from Dharwad. Savadatti is also the name of the taluk (sub-district), which was previously named Parasgad. There are several ancient temples in Savadatti.

== History of Rashtrakuta kings ==
The historical name of the Savadatti was Sugandavarti "Sougandipura". It was the capital of the Ratta dynasty (from 875-1230) and Ancient hub of Jainism.

- During the twelfth and thirteenth centuries, Belagavi was the capital of the Rattas, the chieftains of Savadatti. The fort at Belagavi was built by Bichiraja (Ratta Dynasty) in 1204.
- The Ratta clan was one of several names of the Rashtrakuta Dynasty.
- Rattas of Savadatti accepted the overlordship of Taila II (AD 973-977).
- Two of the pillars at Belagavi fort have Kannada inscriptions in Nagari script, one inscription from around 1199 is attributed to the Ratta king Kartaveerya IV.

=== Rattas (Rashtrakutas) ===
- In one of the inscriptions related to Rattas of Savadatti it is mentioned that Krishna III having appointed Prithvirama as a chief feudatory had dignified the Ratta dynasty of Savadatti.
- The Rattas of Savadatti, used to represent themselves as Lords of Lattaluru(present day Latur).

=== Inscriptions ===
- At Savadatti, Jain inscription slab written in Sanskrit and Kanarese (Kannada) of krishna III the king of Rashtrakuta, Shaka 797 (c. 875 AD), and Vikramaditya, Shaka 1017 (c. 1095 AD).
- At Savadatti, in front of the Western Chalukya-style Ankeshwara temple, there is an inscription carved into the wall by the Ratta Chief Ankarasa.

=== Jainism ===
- The Rattas of Savadatti were Jains and are descendants of the Rashtrakutas, who were also follower of Jainism.
- In the 11th century Rattas of Savadatti and their provincial governors were great patrons of Jainism.

== Renuka Saagara Reservoir ==
Renuka Sagara is a reservoir formed by damming the Malaprabha River adjacent to Savadatti.

== Gallery ==
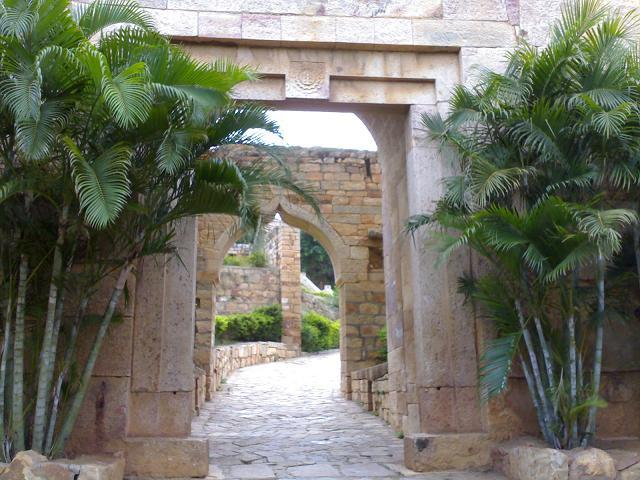
Savadatti Fort

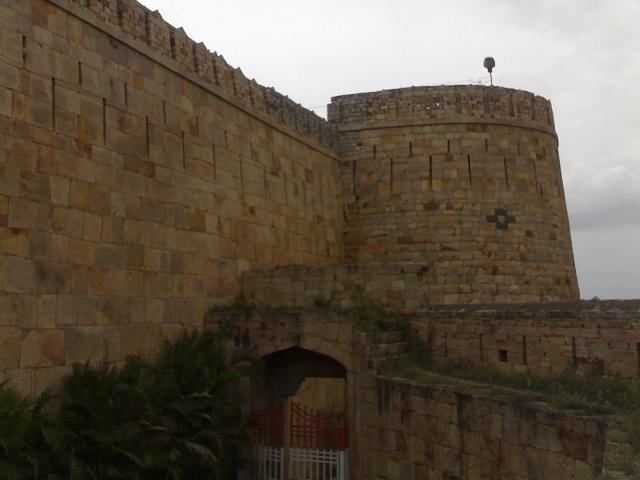
Savadatti Fort

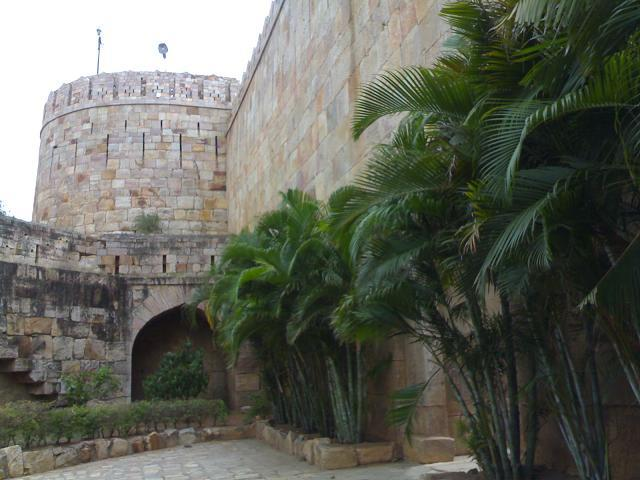
Savadatti Fort

== See also ==
- Marikamba Temple, Sirsi
- Chalukyas
- Rashtrakuta
- Branches of Rashtrakuta Dynasty
- Navilateertha
- Parasgad fort
- Sogal
- Hooli
- North Karnataka
- Tourism in North Karnataka
