= Nolamba dynasty =

Dynasty of India

The Nolamba dynasty were a dynasty of southern India. During the late 8th to early 11th centuries, they controlled parts of south-eastern Karnataka. At its height, their territory — called Nolamba-vadi — included the adjoining parts of Andhra Pradesh and Tamil Nadu. The Nolambas (often styled Nolamba or Nolamba-Pallavas) are known to us chiefly through local inscriptions — notably the Hemavathi (Hemavati) pillar inscription and several district inscriptions (Chitradurga, Madhugiri / Madakasira, etc.). These epigraphic records provide the genealogy, titles and a sequence of rulers. The Nolamba polity, called Nolambavadi, lies in parts of present-day Tumkur, Chitradurga, Kolar, Bangalore (rural), Chittoor, Anantapur and neighbouring districts. Because most knowledge comes from inscriptions, some dates and the precise territorial limits remain approximate and subject to scholarly interpretation.The area they held sway over is also referred to as Nolambasa-37 of Henjeru (Hemavathi) and Nolambalige (Nolambavadi-32000).

== Origin ==
R. Narasimhacharya states that the Nolambas were a native Kannada dynasty. An inscription says that the Nolamba dynasty claimed descent from the King Trinayana Pallava.

== List of Kings ==
=== Mangala Nolambadhiraja (c. 735 – 785 AD) ===
Mangala Nolambadhiraja is recorded in the Hemavathi inscription and is regarded as the first prominently attested Nolamba king. The inscription credits him with victories over the Kiratakas and praises his valor. Contemporary Chalukya records refer to him respectfully, indicating political recognition by the Badami Chalukya. There is no clear epigraphic evidence that precisely maps the full extent of his realm, so the size of the kingdom under Mangala remains uncertain.

=== Simhapota (c. 785 – 805 AD) ===
Simhapota is named as Mangala's son and successor. During Simhapota's reign the Nolambas were feudatories of the Western Ganga dynasty king Shivamara II. When Shivamara II was imprisoned by the Rashtrakutas, a power struggle ensued: Shivamara's brother Durgamara attempted to seize the Ganga throne. Simhapota intervened militarily against Durgamara and, in the shifting balance of power, accepted Govinda III of the Rastrakutas as his suzerain.

=== Charuponeru (c. 805 – 830 AD) ===
Charuponeru was the son of Simhapota. He initially remained loyal to Govinda III as his father had done. After Govinda III's death, when Amoghavarsha (Amoghavarsha Nrupathunga) ascended the Rashtrakuta throne (Amoghavarsha was young at accession), many feudatories asserted autonomy. Charuponeru was among those who began acting independently as central control loosened.

=== Pollalchora I (c. 830 – 875 AD) — alliances and expansion ===
Pollalchora was Charuponeru's son. During his reign South Indian politics were highly unstable. The Gangas and Nolambas allied in campaigns against the Banas; the conflict for the fertile tract of Gangavadi (described in records as 6,000 villages) was one focal point. Through military success against rival chieftains — and in later campaigns against the Pallavas — Pollalchora's forces expanded Nolambavadi; some accounts record Nolamba influence reaching as far as Kanchipuram during this period (though the exact limits are debated among historians). A strategic marital alliance strengthened Nolamba–Ganga ties: Jayabe, daughter of a Ganga ruler (descendant of Rachamalla I), was married into the Nolamba family (to a prince recorded in inscriptions as Pollalchora's son), cementing the two houses' cooperation.

=== Mahendra I and succession uncertainties (c. 875 – late 9th century) ===
Pollalchora's son Mahendra I (Mahendradhiraja) succeeded around 875 AD. The record after Mahendra becomes less clear. The Hemavathi inscription and others later name Nanniashraya Ayyappadeva (Ayyappadeva / Nanni Ayyappadeva) as a subsequent ruler, but the earliest epigraphic evidence for Ayyappadeva's regnal year appears later (the first recorded regnal date in an inscription is Saka 919 / c. 997 CE depending on interpretation), leaving a historiographical gap. Historians infer that a half-brother or collateral claimant — named Iriva Nolambadiraja Nolapaya in inscriptions (described as the son of Devbarasi) — may have held power for a time between Mahendra and Ayyappadeva. This inference is based on references in the Madugiri and Hemavathi inscriptions and the need to account for apparent gaps in dated records.

=== Ayyappadeva I(Nanniashraya)-( 897 – 934 AD) ===
Ayyappadeva (often equated with Nanniashraya Ayyappadeva / Ayyappadeva I) is recorded in the Madakasira inscriptions and other records. Mahendra is reported to have died fighting the Gangas, after which the Gangas captured parts of Nolambavadi. Ayyappadeva continued military efforts against the Gangas to recover territories. In his later years Ayyappadeva's alignment with the Rashtrakutas drew the attention of resurgent Chalukya forces; an invasion led by Chalukya king Bhima (of the later Chalukya phase) resulted in a battle in which Ayyappadeva was killed in 934 AD. Ayyappadeva left four sons — Ankayya, Maydha Nolippa, Bira Nolamba (Aniga Bira Nolamba), and Iriva Nolamba Dilipa (Diliparaja) — and after his death Nolambavadi fragmented among these heirs.

=== Fragmentation and later rulers (mid-10th century) ===
After Ayyappadeva's death the kingdom split among his sons and grandsons:

• Bira Nolamba (Aniga Bira Nolamba) — he is recorded ruling c. 934 – 940 AD; he married a Chalukya princess and launched campaigns against the Gangas but was defeated.

• Iriva Nolamba Diliparaja (Diliparaja / Dilipa) — ruled approximately 941 – 968 AD; he was a Rashtrakuta feudatory (at times allied under Govinda III's successor line). During Dilipa's time the Gangas and Banas were also allied with Rashtrakutas; the Nolambas and Gangas fought alongside Rashtrakutas in wars against the Cholas, and Dilipa had repeated border wars with Chola forces.

• Nanni Nolamba (son of Dilipa) — reigned c. 966 – 975 AD and bore the title "Challadhakkara", ruling principally from the Kolar region. During his reign conflicts with the Gangas resumed; the Ganga king Marasimha weakened Nolamba power. Although the Nolambas later regained some territory after Marasimha's death, they never returned to their former dominance.

During the late 10th century the Rashtrakuta decline, Ganga resurgence, Chola pressure and internal partitions led to the Nolambas' loss of consolidated authority. Over the next centuries the Nolamba lineage continued in lesser, local forms as the Madhugiri/Bijjavara polygars and other chieftains who claimed Nolamba descent. Eventually, a second local phase of Nolamba rule emerges under Raja Hiregowda, who established the Madhugiri Mahanada Prabhus branch, preserving Nolamba heritage at a regional level.

== Later Medieval Succession ==
After losing primary power as kings, the Nolambas shifted their focus and gradually moved towards Bellary in the north. Centuries later, chieftains who remained in the Nolambavadi region initiated a new regional phase of the dynasty, known as the Second Phase of the Nolambas Bijjavara-Madhugiri Polygars.

=== Origins & Founding ===
• This period is traditionally attributed to Raja Hiregowda, who ruled from the capital Tungavathi around 1130 AD.

• He had two queens:

- First Queen: Three sons — Raja Maregowda, Channappa Gowda, and Sangappa Gowda
- Second Queen: Four sons — Kalachikkappagowda, Ramappa Gowda, Chikkappagowda, and Chikaramappa Gowda

=== Branches & Chieftaincies ===
From these lines emerged multiple chieftaincies across present-day Tumkur, Karnataka:

- Channappa Gowda – Chieftain of Tereyuru
- Sangappa Gowda – Chieftain of Chelur
- Kalachikkappagowda – Chieftain of Gubbi Hosahalli
- Ramappa Gowda – Chieftain of Ennegere
- Chikkappagowda – Chieftain of Bidre
- Chikaramappa Gowda – Chieftain of Kora

These sub-branches represent the gradual decentralization of authority among regional Nolamba chieftains.

=== Later Medieval Succession ===
- Raja Maregowda's line continued as follows:

Raja Viregowda → Raja Doddegowda → Raja Hirechikkappa Gowda (ruled ~1524 AD, shifted the capital to Bijavara).

• His successors were:

- Raja Karithimachikkappa Gowda
- Raja Immadi Chikkappagowda (ruled ~1594 AD)
- Raja Mummudi Chikka Bhupala (ruled ~1614 – 1640 AD) — a devout follower of Lord Venkateshwara. Built temple for Lord Venkateshwara in Madhugiri.

Raja Mummudi Chikka Bhupala's sons became influential regional rulers:

- Sangappa Gowda – Chieftain of Madhugiri
- Hire Thontappa Gowda – Chieftain of Channarayanadurga
- Raja Kalla Chikkappa Gowda – Chieftain of Medigeshi, known for expanding his territory.

Raja Kalla Chikkappa Gowda had two sons: Raja Ramappa Gowda and Raja Thimappa Gowda.

=== Decline & Transition ===
In 1678, Chikka Devaraja Wodeyar II of Mysore launched a campaign against the Nolamba chieftains, capturing Raja Ramappa Gowda. Following this, the six primary Nolamba lineages descended from Raja Hiregowda's sons came under Mysore's control.

The chieftain families continued to live in the Tumkur northern region ( Kora, Chelur, Tereyuru, Gubbi Hosahalli, Ennegere, Bidre ) as respected local leaders.

Officers and kings belonging to the Nolamba dynasty include the following:

- Simhapota, a Nolamba chief, subordinate to the Ganga kings.
- Mahendra I, Ayyapadeva who probably ruled around the period of Krishna II of the Rastrakutas.
- Anniga or Annayya with the title Bira-Nolamba ruled in the period of Amoghavarsha of Rastrakutas.
- Dilipa or Iriva Nolamba around the period of Krishna III of the Rashtrakutas. According to an inscription from Aimangala, 56 Dilipa's son and successor was Nanni Nolamba.
- There are two other names after Nanni Nolamba, namely Polalchora II and Vira Mahendra or Mahendra II as per Kolar district inscriptions.

As long as the Rastrakutas were strong Nolamba flourished under their influence. But after their collapse Nolamba Dynasty lost its influence and power. Nolambas were overrun by the Ganga king Marasimha II (963-975 CE), who boasts of having destroyed the Nolamba family and had the title Nolambakulantaka. Nanni Nolamba was the king who was ruling in c. 970 CE. Ahavamalla Nolamba appears identical with Nanni Nolamba. Mahendra II was succeeded by his younger brother Iriva Nolamba II Ghateyankakara, who was too young to come to the throne. Hence, Mahendra's mother Divabbarasi was the queen regent during this period of interregnum after his death. Rajaraja I, the Chola emperor, invaded Nolambavadi and occupied most of its southern parts. Trailokyamalla Nanni Nolamba II Pallava Permanadi succeeded Jagadekamalla Irmadi Nolamba and was installed on the throne on 5 April 1044 CE.

Other Nolamba officers listed in various inscriptions are: Irivabe-danga Nolamba Ghateyankakara, who appears to have married Pampa Devi, a daughter of Satyashraya of Western chalukyas.

- The Nolamba vassal under Jayasimha of Western Chalukya was Udayaditya (about 1018–1035) also called as Vira-Nonamba Jagadekamalla Malladeva.
- Jagadekamalla Immadi Nolamba Pallava Permanadi, perhaps the successor of Udayaditya, was ruling over Kadambalige in 1037.
- Vijaya Pandya who ruled over Nolambavadi from Uchangi from about 1148 to about 1187.

== Temples attributed to the Nolambas ==
- Kalleshvara Temple, Aralaguppe, Tiptur taluk
- Kalleshwara Temple, Chikkahulikunte, Sira taluk
- Nolamba Narayaneshvara temple, Avani, Mulbagal Taluk
- Siddeshwara Temple, Madhapura, Honnali taluk (Also Known as Heggeri Siddeshwara)
- Shankara muth, Avani, Mulbagal Taluk
- Sri. Bhoga Nandeshwara, Nandi, Chikkaballapura Taluk
- Sri.Venugopala, Tondanur, Pandavapura Taluk
- Sri.Yoga Narasimha, Tondanur, Pandavapura Taluk
- Siddeswara (Henjerappa) and Doddeswara Temples built by Nolamba pallava kings in the 9th century, Hemavati, Anantapur district
- Sri Veeranjaneya Swamy Temple, Aragonda Village, Chittoor Dt. Andhra Pradesh
- Sri Siddeswara Temple, Siddeswarana Durga Kolapala Village, Challakere Taluk, Chitradurga Dt. Karnataka dated 834AD

== See also ==
- Religion in Western Ganga kingdom
- Ardhagiri
