= Byalya =

Coordinates: 13°39′N 77°18′E

Byalya is a village in Madhugiri Taluk, Tumkur district, Karnataka State in India.
