= Adavinagenahalli =

Coordinates: 13°46′N 77°21′E

Adavinagenahalli Nagenahalli
- village
- Interactive map of Adavinagenahalli
- Country: India
- State: Karnataka
- District: Tumkur
- Talukas: Madhugiri

Government
  - Body: Village Panchayat Singanahalli

Languages
  - Official: Kannada
- Time zone: UTC+5:30 (IST)
- Nearest city: Tumkur
- Civic agency: Village Panchayat

Adavinagenahalli is a village in the southern state of Karnataka, India. It is located in the Madhugiri taluk of Tumkur district in Karnataka.

== See also ==
- Tumkur
- Districts of Karnataka
