= Achenahalli =

Coordinates: 13°41′N 77°10′E

- village
- Interactive map of Achenahalli
- Country: India
- State: Karnataka
- District: Tumkur
- Talukas: Madhugiri

Government
  - Body: Village Panchayat

Languages
  - Official: Kannada
- Time zone: UTC+5:30 (IST)
- Nearest city: Tumkur
- Civic agency: Village Panchayat

Achenahalli is a village in the southern state of Karnataka, India. It is located in the Madhugiri taluk of Tumkur district in Karnataka.

== See also ==
- Tumkur
- Districts of Karnataka
