= Ramalingeshwara group of temples, Avani =

Ramalingeshwara group of temples
- Hindu temple
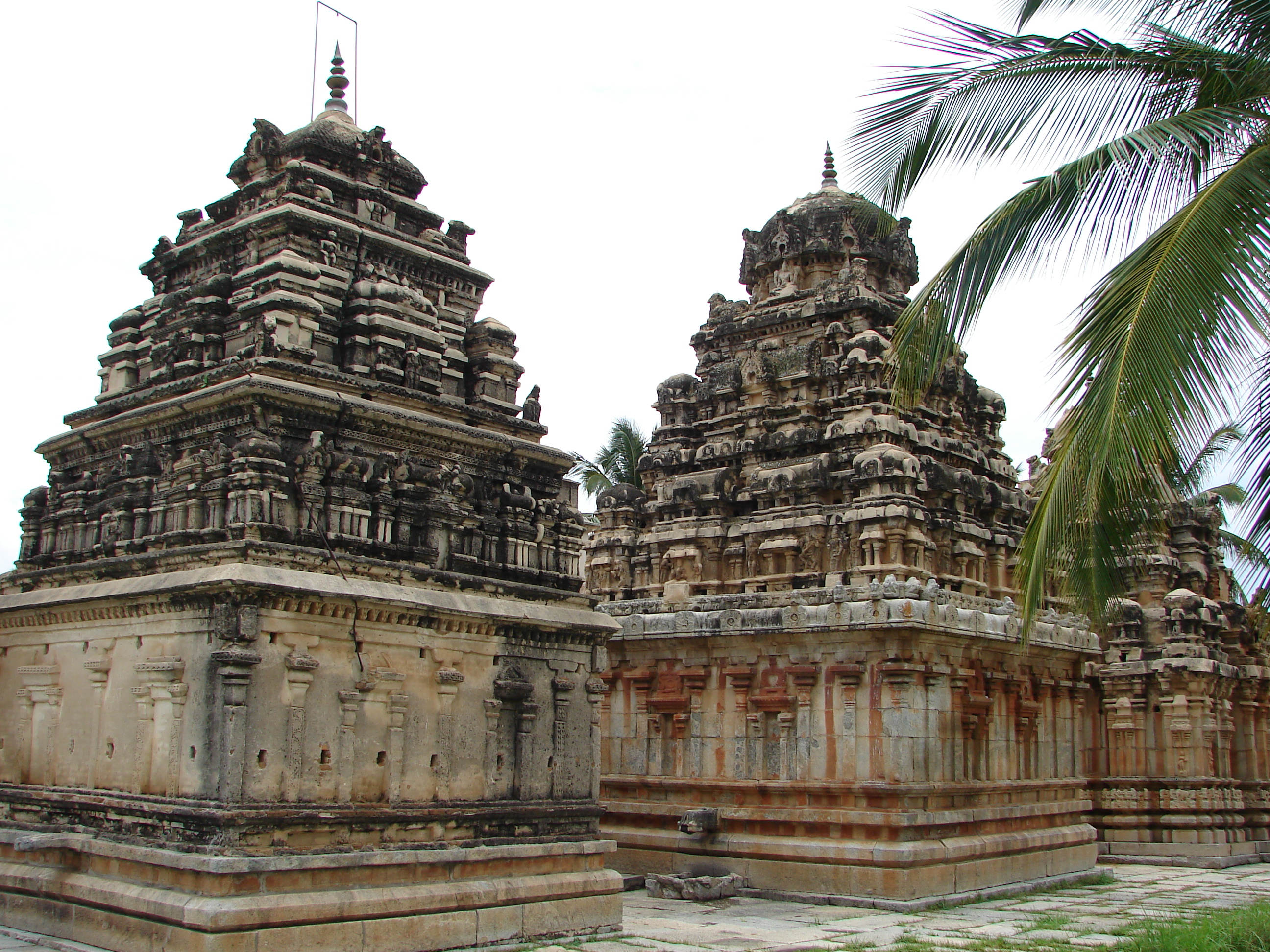
- Ramalingeshwara (Rameshvara) group in Kolar district
- Interactive map of Ramalingeshwara group of temples
- Country: India
- State: Karnataka
- District: Kolar District

Languages
  - Official: Kannada
- Time zone: UTC+5:30 (IST)

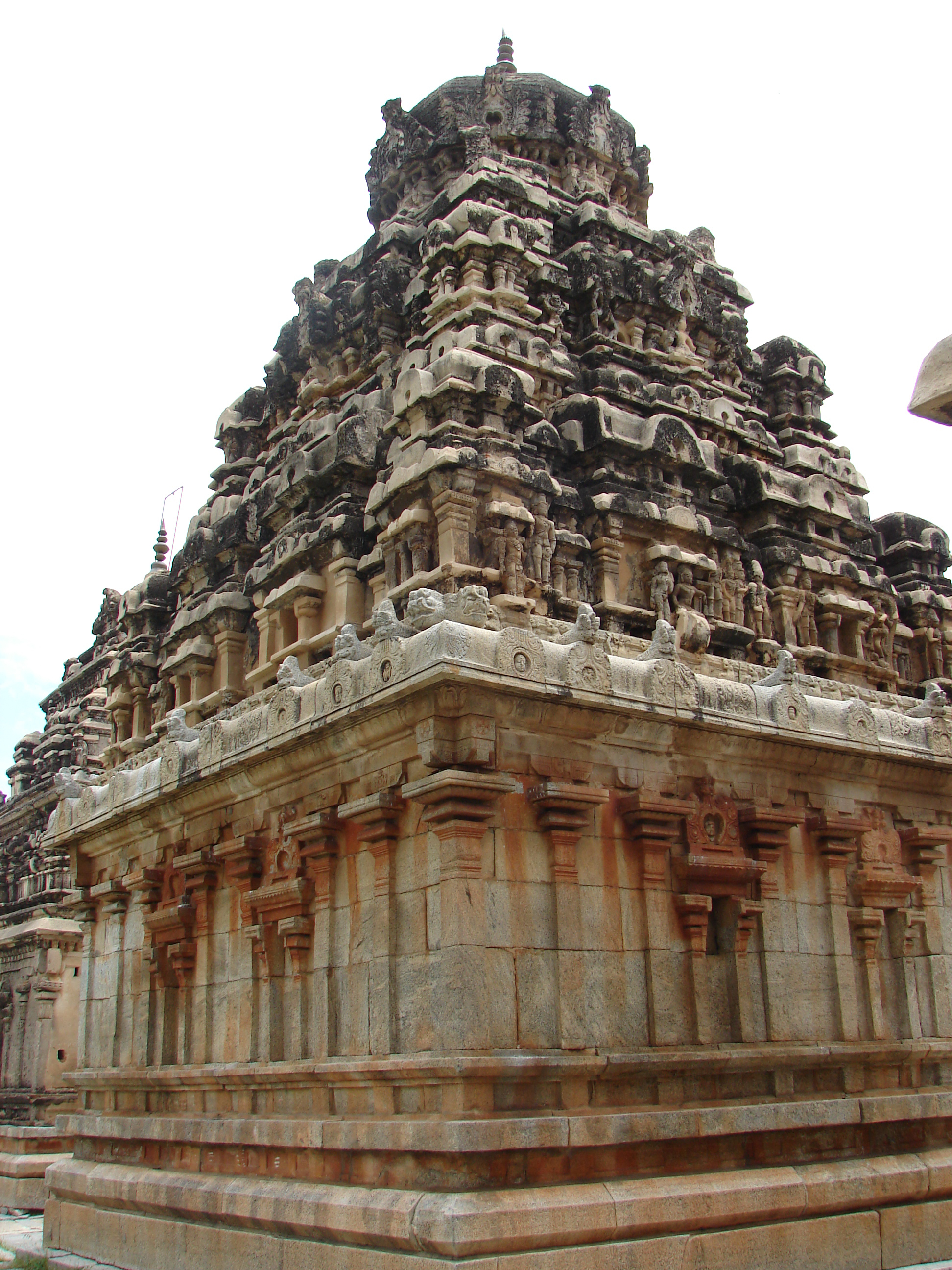
Dravidian superstructure (shikhara) at Ramalingeshwara group of temples, Avani

The Ramalingeshwara group of temples (also spelt Ramalingeshvara or Ramalingesvara and sometimes referred to as Rameshvara group), situated in Avani town of the Kolar district, Karnataka state, India, is constructed in the dravida style. According to the Archaeological Survey of India (ASI), the temple is an ornate 10th-century Nolamba dynasty construction which was partially renovated later by the Chola dynasty.The Vijayanagara kings built the main Mandapam and Rajagopuram. The temple is protected by the Archaeological Survey of India as a monument of national importance.

== History ==
Avani is a place of great antiquity. According to the ASI, an inscription here dated 399 A.D. refers to it. Later inscriptions call it the "Gaya of the south". Legend has it that Avani was the abode of the Hindu saint Valmiki (author of the epic Ramayana) and that the Hindu god Rama visited Avani during his return to Ayodhya from Lanka. According to the legend, Rama's sons Lava and Kusha were born here on an existing hill (called "Lava-Kusha betta" in native Kannada) a short distance from the temple complex.

According to the art historian Madhusudan Dhaky, Nolamba temple constructions exist in the region historically known as "Nolambavadi", a region to the east of Gangavadi (a region in south Karnataka) but west of Andhradesa (modern Andhra Pradesh). He dates the temple to the early 10th century. According to the art historian James Harle, the earliest structure within the walled enclosure (prakara) may actually be what is known as the Shatrugnalineshwara shrine (or "Shatrugneshvara") and was built by the Western Ganga dynasty of Talakad (based on an Ganga inscription on the premises). This was soon followed by the Lakshmanalingeshwara shrine. According to Harle, this is the earliest example of a group of shrines with an outer wall enclosure in the Karnataka state.

== Temple plan ==
The temple complex comprises four major shrines, one each for Rama, Lakshmana, Bharata and Shatrughna. There are other minor shrines, such as those for Vali and Sugriva. The Ramalingeshwara temple (or "Rameshvara") consists of a sanctum (garbhagriha), a vestibule (antarala) and a hall (navaranga) with decorative pillars. The base (adhishthana) of the temple comprises moldings articulated with Kirtimukha and lions in relief. The outer walls have pilasters surmounted by dravida towers (shikhara).

The Lakshmanalingeshwara temple (or "Lakshmaneshvara") which houses the largest linga (universal symbol of the god Shiva) has on a wall, a depiction of the noted 10th-century saint Tribhuvanakarta holding a rudraksha (sacred beads) necklace. The pillars in the hall (as well as in the Bharatalingeshwara or Bharateshvara shrine) have several relief sculptures and the ceiling has a fine sculpture of Uma-Mahesvara (Shiva with consort Parvati) surrounded by an ensemble of ashtadikpalas (ashta - "eight", dik - "directions", pala - "guardian"; guardians in eight directions).

There is a shrine for Parvati also in this group. The external decorative elements for all shrines include five moldings ornamented with friezes of elephants, lions, yali, makara (imaginary beast) above which are wall pilasters and reliefs of yakshas, dvarapalas(door or gate keepers), images of Shiva, Bhairava, Bhairavi, Vishnu and Ganesha.

== Gallery ==
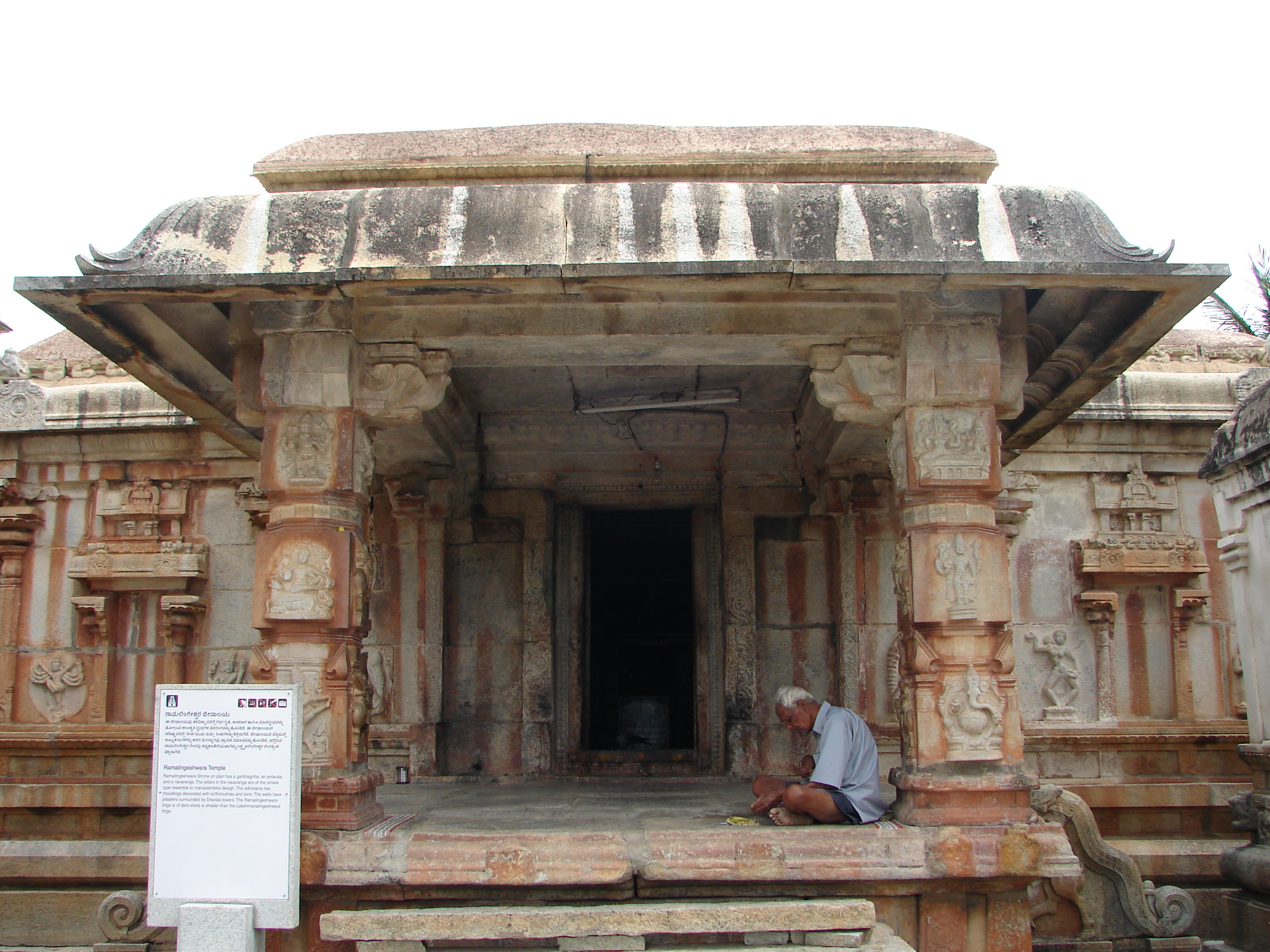
Entrance to the Ramalingeshwara shrine at Ramalingeshwara group of temples, Avani

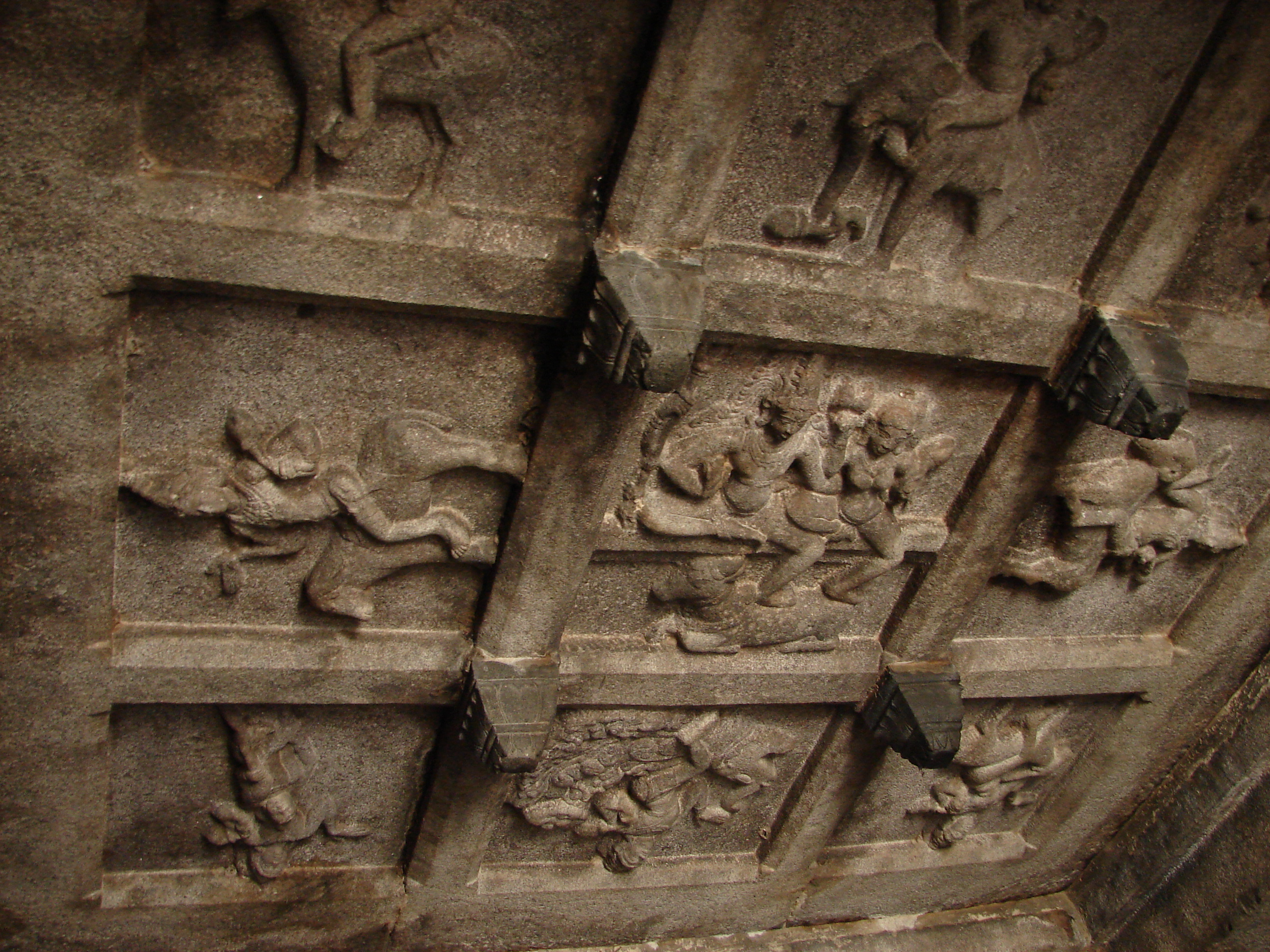
Ceiling sculptures at Ramalingeshwara group of temples, Avani

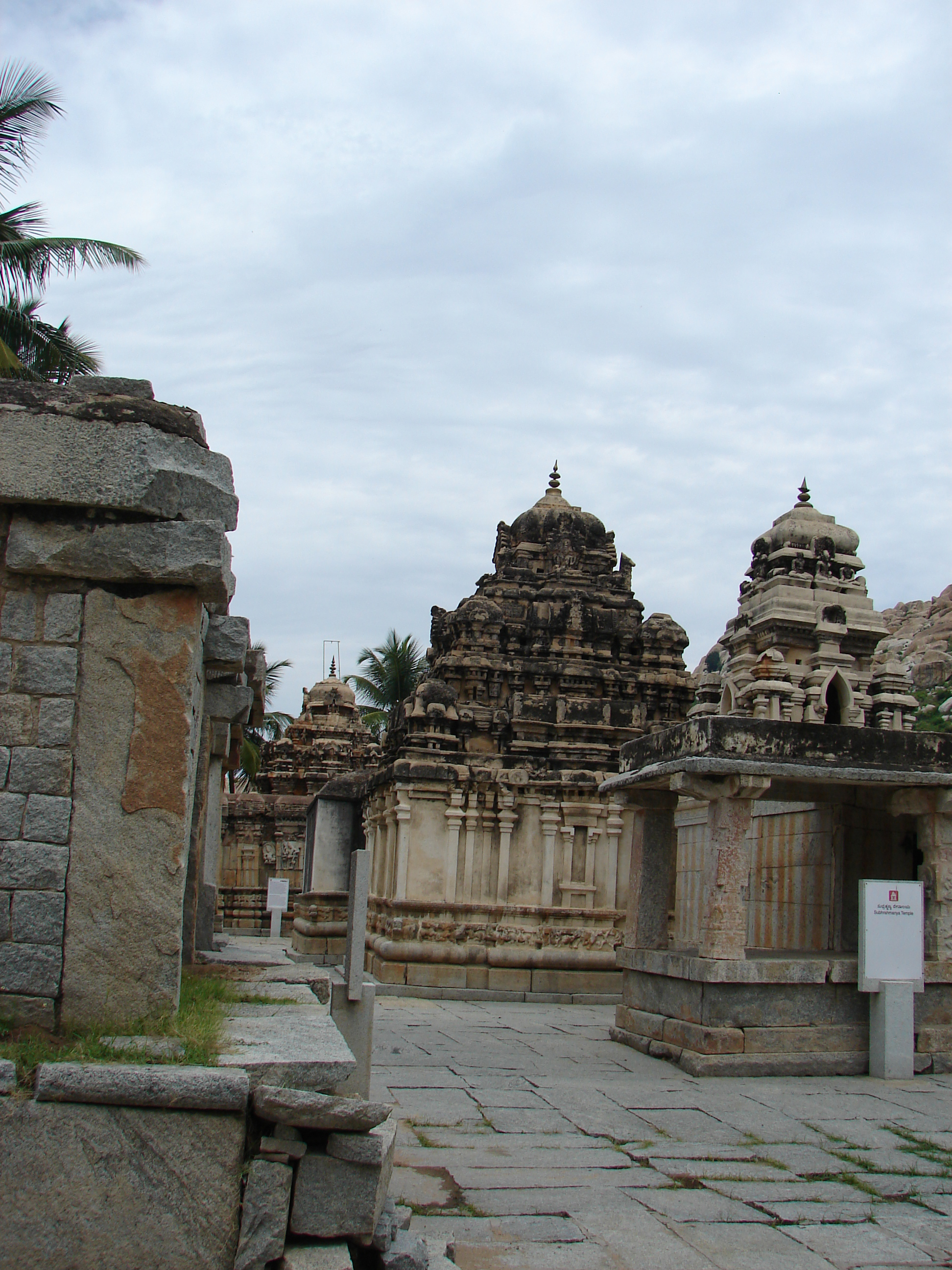
A view in the Ramalingeshwara group of temples, Avani

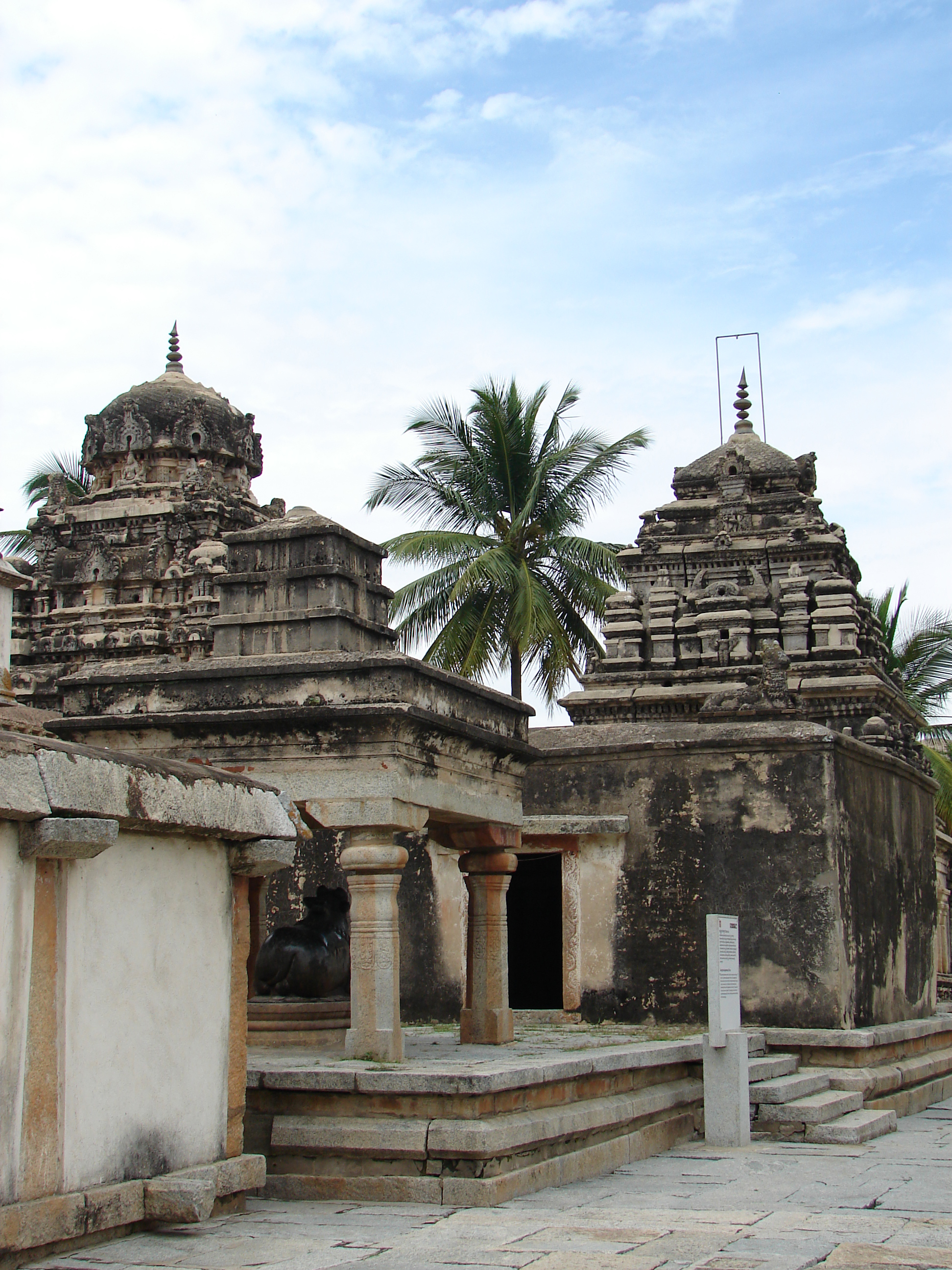
A view of the Ramalingeshwara group of temples, Avani

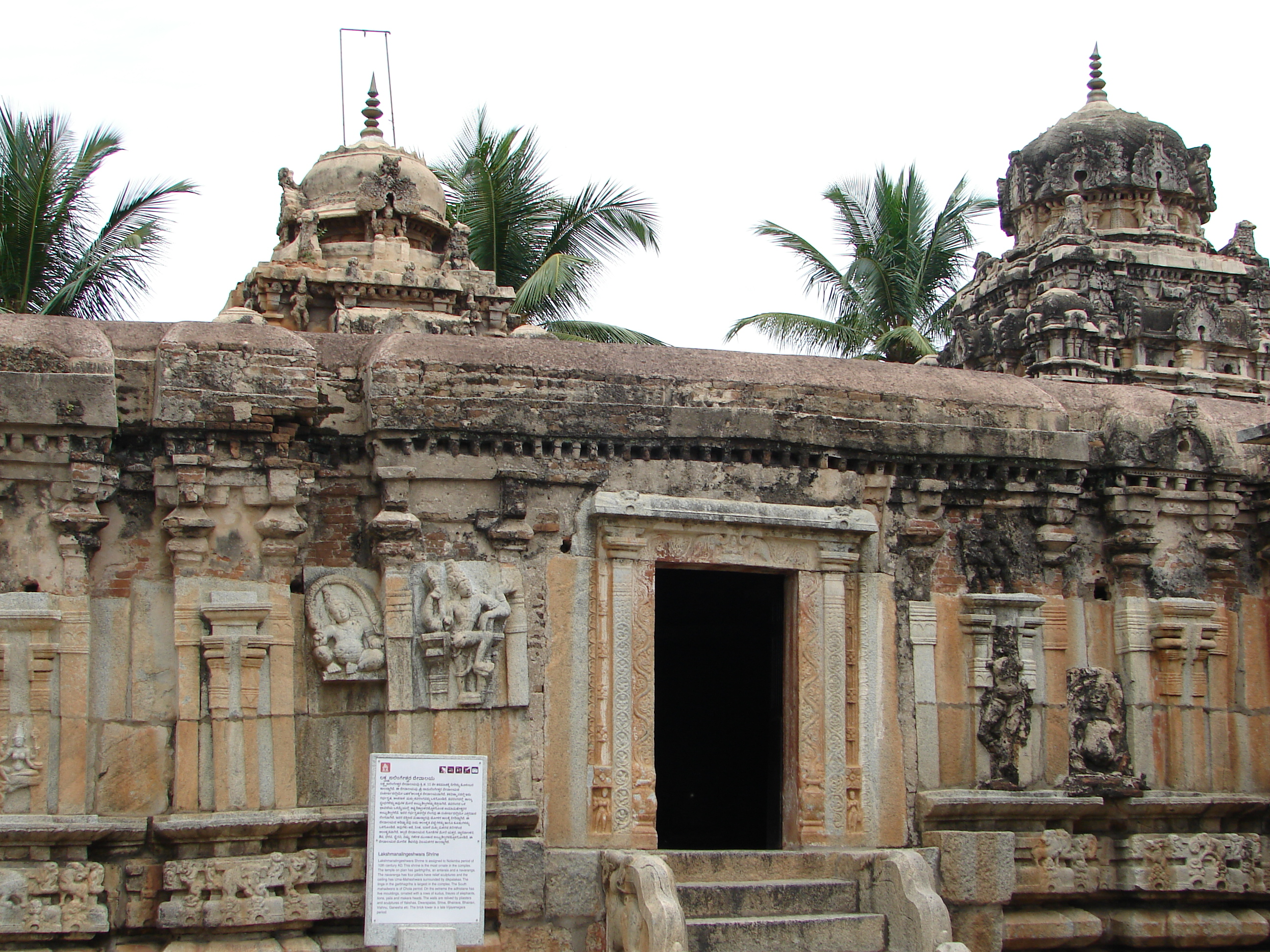
Entrance to Lakshmanalingeshwara temple in the Ramalingeshwara group of temples, Avani

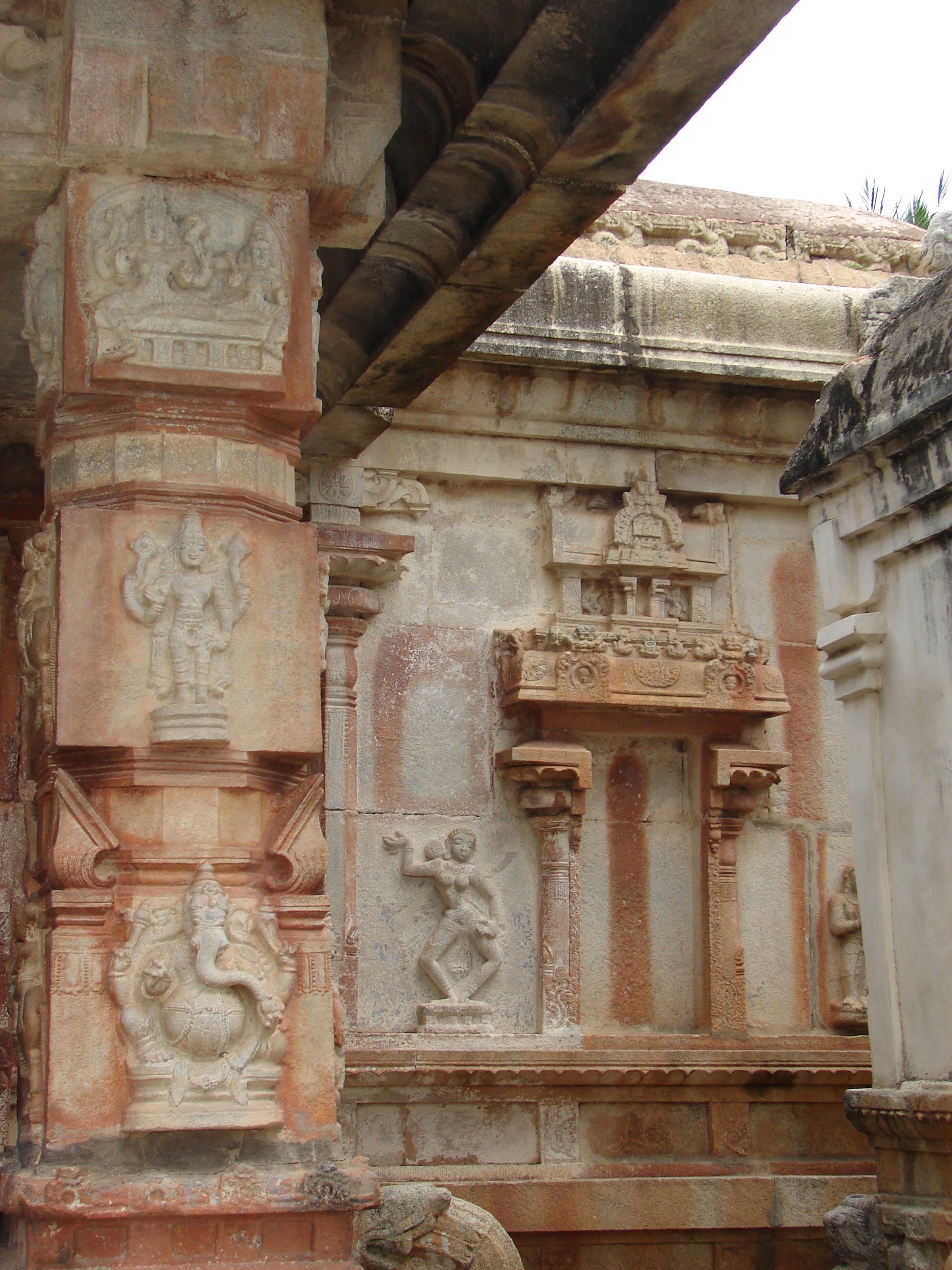
Wall and porch pillar relief in the Ramalingeshwara group of temples, Avani

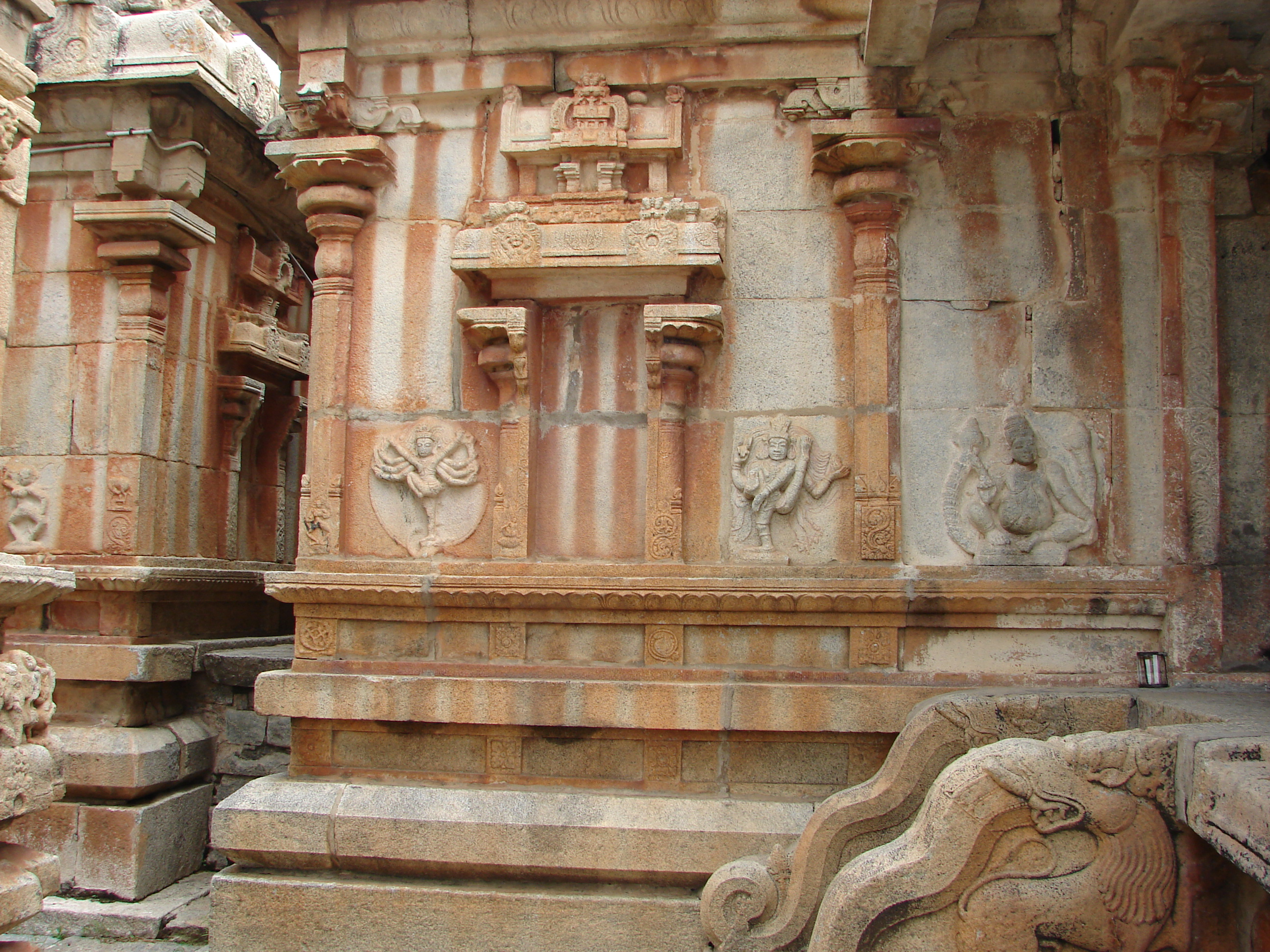
Wall relief and yali baluster entrance to shrine in the Ramalingeshwara group of temples, Avani

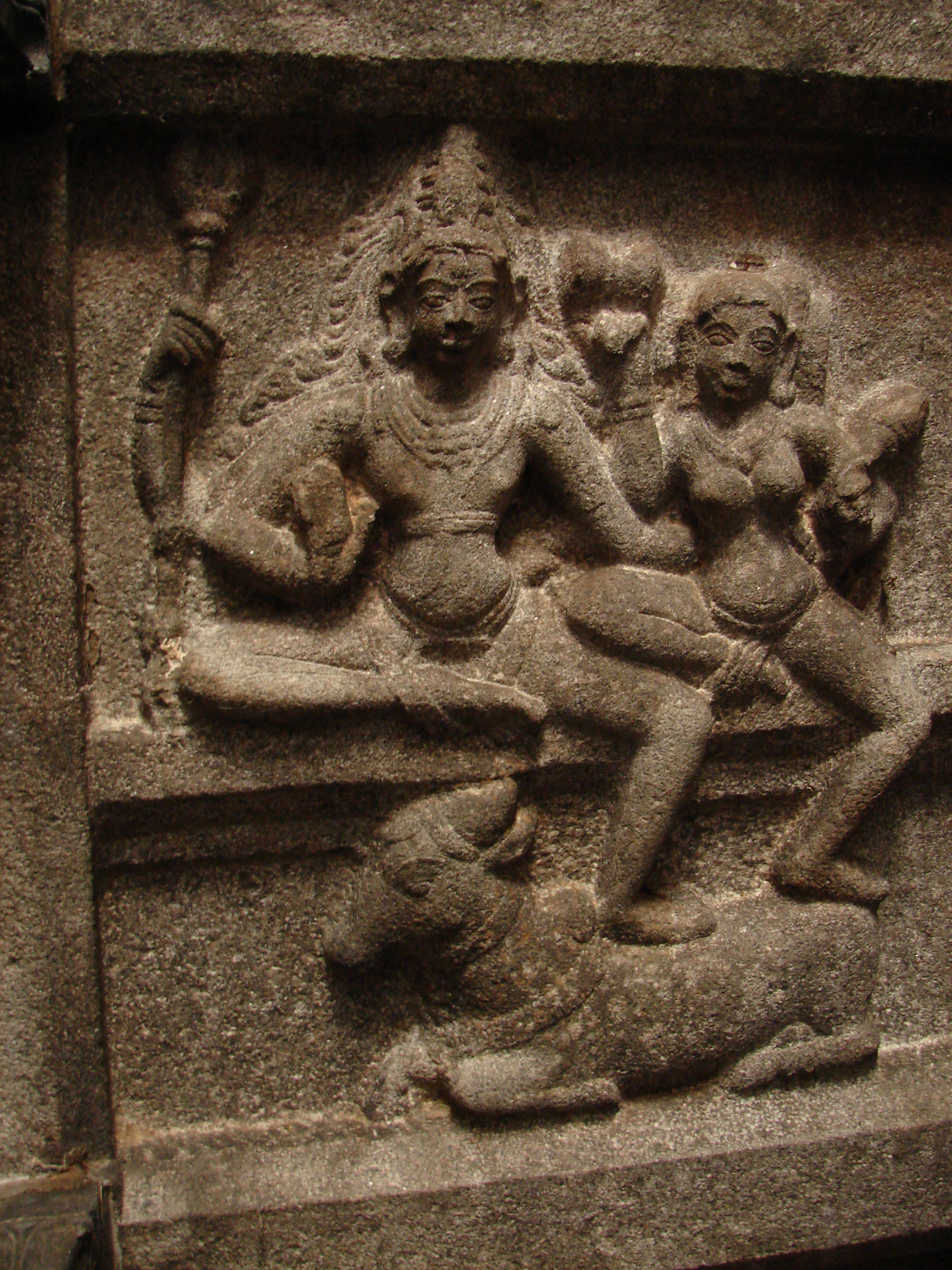
A ceiling relief of in the Ramalingeshwara group of temples, Avani

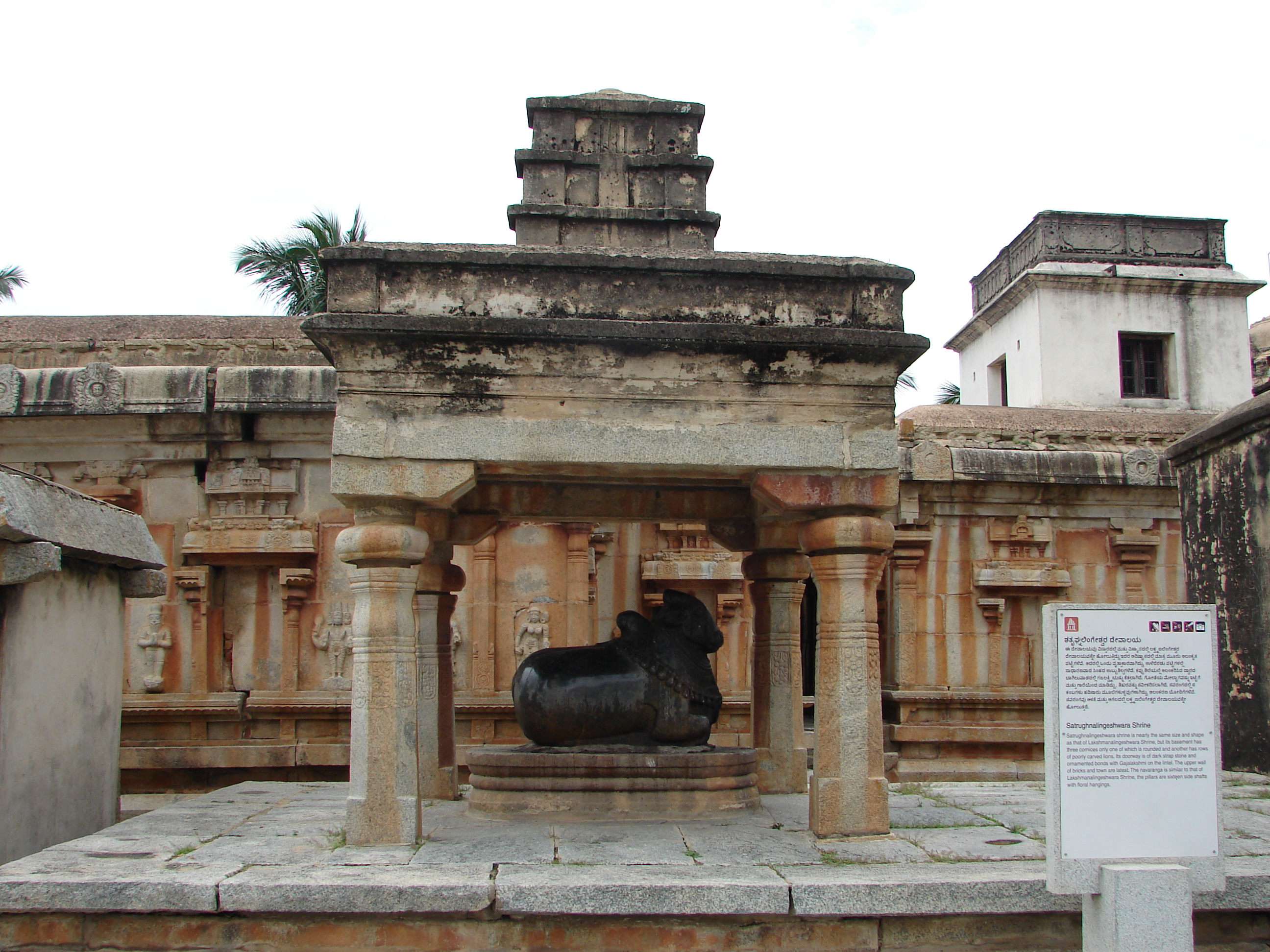
Nandi (bull) facing Shatrugnalingeshwara shrine in the Ramalingeshwara group of temples, Avani

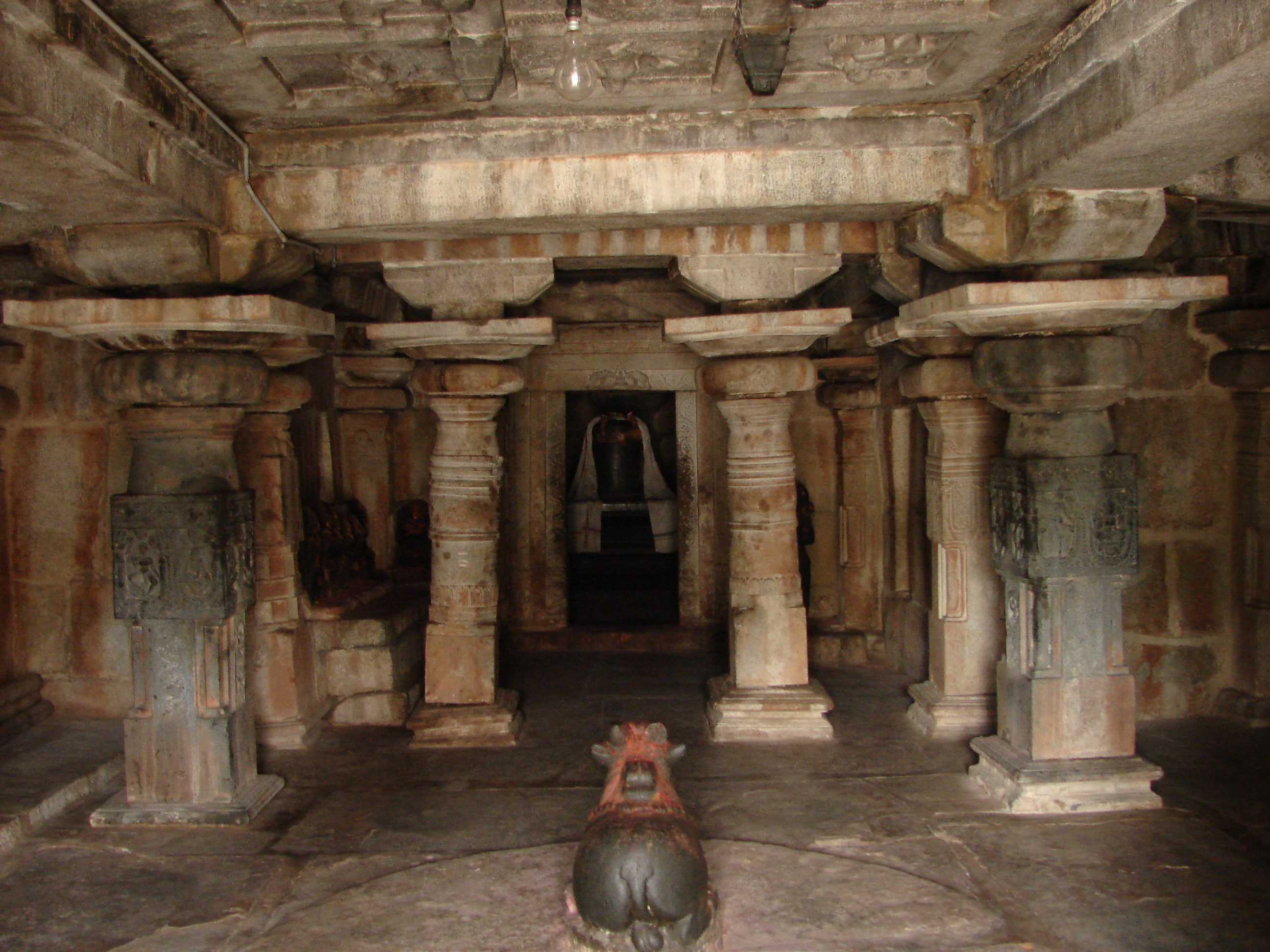
Pillared navaranga hall in the Ramalingeshwara group of temples, Avani

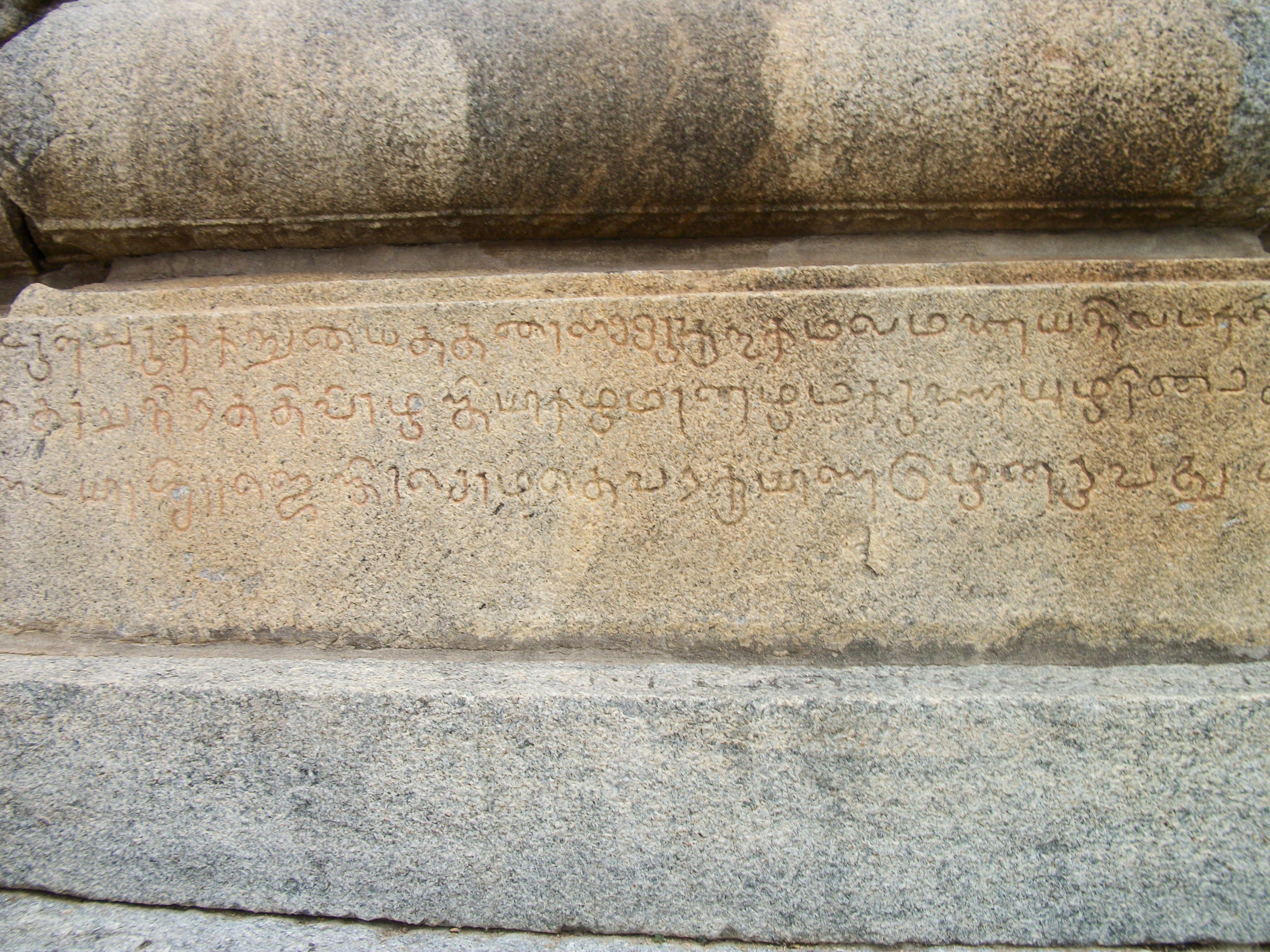
Stone inscriptions on the wall of Ramalingeshwara group of temples, Avani
