= Religion in Western Ganga kingdom =

The Western Ganga Dynasty (350 - 1000 CE) (Kannada: ಪಶ್ಚಿಮ ಗಂಗ ಸಂಸ್ಥಾನ) was an important ruling dynasty of ancient Karnataka. Its members are known as Western Gangas to distinguish them from the Eastern Gangas who in later centuries ruled over modern Orissa. The Western Gangas ruled as a sovereign power from the middle of fourth century to middle of sixth century, initially from Kolar, later moving their capital to Talakad on the banks of the Kaveri River in modern Mysore district. Though territorially a small kingdom, the Western Ganga contribution to polity, culture and literature of the modern south Karnataka region is considered noteworthy. The Ganga kings showed benevolent tolerance to all faiths but are most famous for their patronage towards Jainism resulting in the construction of fine monuments in such places as Shravanabelagola and Kambadahalli.

== Religion ==
The Western Gangas gave patronage to all the major religious faiths of the time; Jainism and different sects of Hinduism such as Shaivism, Vaishnavism and Mīmāṃsā school. However scholars have argued that not all Ganga kings may have given equal priority to all the faiths. Some historians believe the Gangas were ardent Jains, though inscriptional evidence is not conclusive since they mention kalamukhas (staunch Shaiva ascetics), pasupatas and lokayatas (followers of Pasupatha doctrine) who flourished in Gangavadi, indicating Shaivism was also popular. King Madhava and Harivarman were devoted of cows and Brahmins and King Vishnugopa was a devout Vaishnava. Madhava III's and Avinita's inscriptions describe lavish endowments to Jain orders and temples. There is also inscriptional evidence King Durvinita performed Vedic sacrifices prompting historians to claim he was a Hindu and was either a Vaishnavite or a Shaivite. However, Western Ganga records from the 8th century reveal a strong Jain influence evidenced by the many basadis they built and due to popularity of saints such as Pushpdanta, Pujyapada, Vajranandi, Srivaradhadeva, Ajitasena.

=== Jainism ===
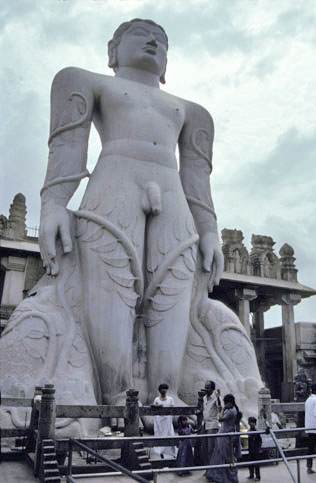
Gommateshwara at Shravanabelagola (982–983) C.E.

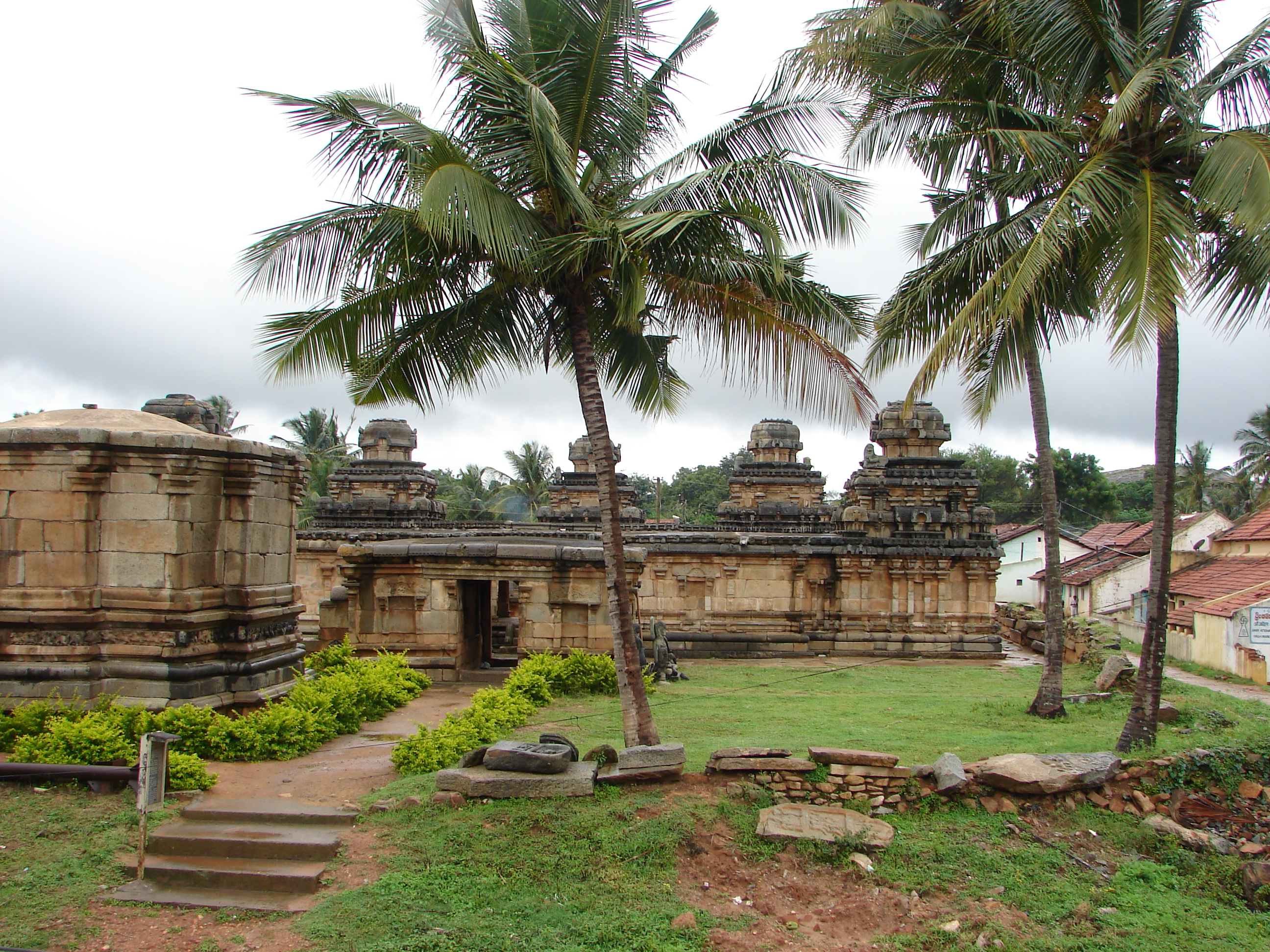
Panchakuta Basadi, Kambadahalli

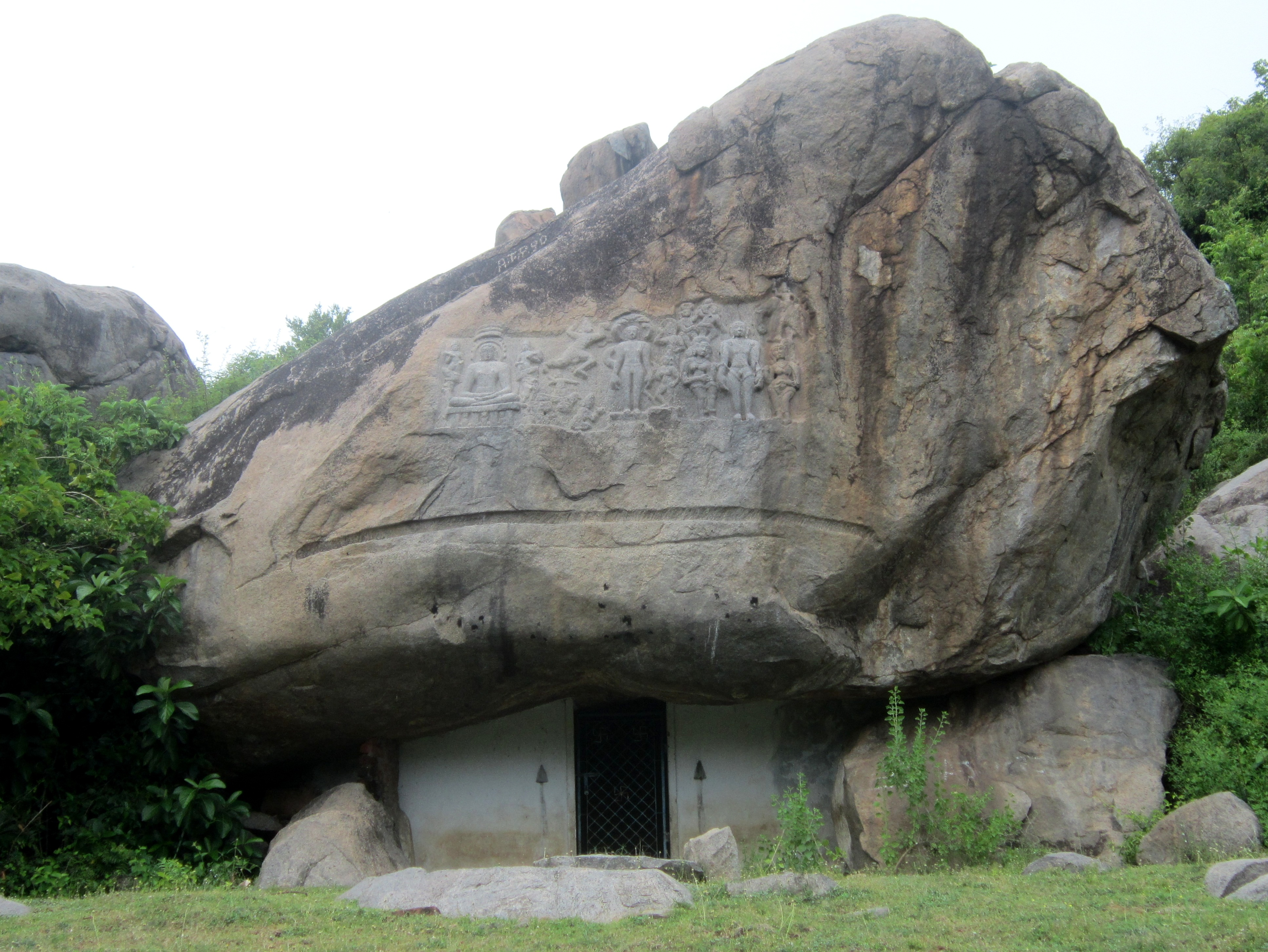
Seeyamangalam Mahavira Rock Cut Temple

Prior to the 8th century, Jain temples were called Chaitya, Cediya, Jainalaya, Jinageha or Jinabhavana, the term Basadi being used only later on. Jain popularity received a further boost from the Ganga overlords, the Rashtrakutas, from the time of Amoghavarsha I. However evidence shows a decline in its popularity among local leadership (landlords or gavundas) from the 10th century when they began to favour Shaivism . The true age of Jain popularity in the region was from the 8th century rule of King Shivamara I leading to the construction of numerous basadis. King Butuga II and minister Chavundaraya were staunch Jains which is evident from the construction of the Gomateshwara monolith. A historian has claimed that majority of those Jains seeking release from the material world (moksha) by inviting death through rituals and asceticism (sannyasa) were from the aristocratic and prosperous mercantile community, such rituals among people from lower social classes being a rarity. Women made endowments to Jain causes too, a royal concubine Nandavva and a wealthy feudal lady Attimabbe being examples.

Jains worshipped the twenty four Tirthankaras (Jinas), whose images were consecrated in their temples. Some scholars believe that Jain worship was not meant to gain boons or favours from the deity, rather to meditate and obtain perfection through detachment. However one historian claims a study of contemporary Jain literature reveals that spiritual and temporal benefits ware sought. The assignment of creative and destructive powers to tirthankars is considered a parallel to the beliefs of Hindus who assigned these powers to Brahma, Vishnu and Shiva, the holy trinity (Trimurti). The worship of the footprint of spiritual leaders such as those of Bhadrabahu in Shravanabelagola from the 10th century is considered a parallel to Buddhism. Some brahminical influences are seen in the consecration of the Gomateshwara monolith which is the statue of Bahubali, the son of tirthankar Adinatha (just as Hindus worshipped the sons of Shiva).

The worship of subordinate deities such as yakshas and yakshinis, earlier considered as mere attendants of the tirthankaras, was a development of the 7th century to 12th century. This is considered the beginning of devotional cults which elevated yakshi Jvalamalini Kalpa and Bhairava Padmavati Kalpa to deity status. Jvalamalini, depicted with flames issuing forth from her head and holding such attributes as a bow, shield, arrows, sword, discuss (cakra) etc., in her eight arms and riding a buffalo was the attendant of the eighth tirthankara, Chandraprabha. Padmavati was the yaksi of the twenty-third tirthankara, Parshva, and may have been derived from the Hindu namesake. Cult worship is considered consistent with the assimilation of forest and tribal dwellers into the Jain faith and a caste based society. While asceticism was upheld in the earlier period, an increased inflow of endowments from wealthy merchants and royalty made monks more settled in temples. Prayers, chantings, decoration and anointment of the deity in Digambara temples were carried out by upajjhayas or acharyas. In contrast, lay devotees in Śvetāmbara derasars undertook these activities and the temple staff merely did the cleaning. Ascetics did not indulge in any direct contact with the image of the deity, rather they spent time in penance and contemplation. A historian has proposed that Jain temples may have employed courtesans (Devadasi or Sule) though this may have been a post 10th century development.

=== Hinduism ===
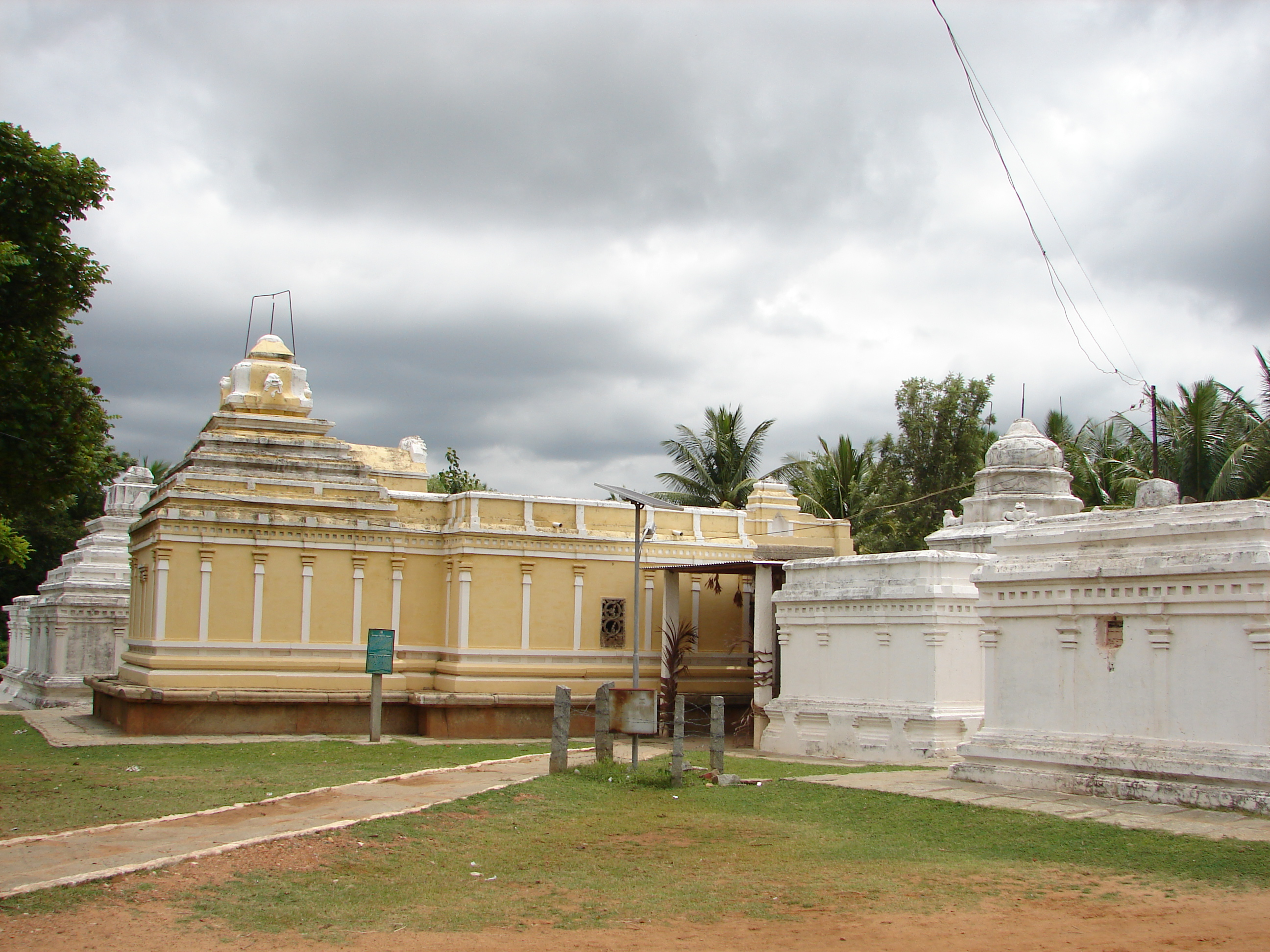
Kalleshwara Temple Complex, built in the 10th century by the Nolambas, a Western Ganga feudatory, at Aralaguppe in the Tumkur district

Vedic Brahminism was popular in the 6th and 7th centuries when inscriptions refer to grants made to Srotriya Brahmins. These inscriptions also describe the gotra (lineage) affiliation to royal families and their adherence of such Vedic rituals as ashvamedha (horse sacrifice) and hiranyagarbha. Brahmins and kings enjoyed a mutually beneficial relationship, rituals performed by the Brahmins gave legitimacy to kings and the land grants made by kings to Brahmins elevated them in society to the level of wealthy landowners who brought forest dwellers into the religious caste based society. During the later part of the Ganga rule, with the rise in Jain popularity, patronage to Brahmins reduced. The Brahmins now sought and occupied influential positions in the military and administration. Brahmins started to make donations to building memorials for fallen heroes and land grants to build temples. By the end of the 10th century, Brahmins resident in agraharas (schools of learning) were participating in puranic forms of worship in temples, constructing new ones or acting as trusties for devabhoga grants (temple grants). Vaishnavism, however, was in a low profile and not many inscriptions describe grants towards its cause. Some Vaishnava temples built by the Gangas were the Narayanaswami temples in Nanjangud, Sattur and Hangala in modern Mysore district, Kodandarama and Yoga Narasimha temples at modern Chikkamagaluru district and the Nolamba Narayaneshvara temple at Avani in modern Kolar district. The deity Vishnu was depicted with four arms holding a conch (Shanka), discus (chakra), mace (gada) and lotus (Padma).

From the beginning of the 8th century, patronage to Shaivism increased from every section of society; from the landed elite, the landlords, the assemblies (samaya) and the schools of learning (aghraharas). Hereditary ruling families such as the Bana, Nolamba and Chalukya clans gave patronage to the Shaivism. Among minor Chalukya kings in Gangavadi region, Narasinga Chalukya of Mysore constructed the Narasingeshwara temple and Kings Goggi and Durga build the Buteshvara temple at Varuna in modern Mysore region. Shaivism received patronage from local landlords, particularly from the 9th century onwards when temple priests and ascetics played an active role in temple construction.

Unlike the Jainism where strict doctrines prevented ascetics and monks from being involved in temple based activities, such regulations did not hamper the Shaiva preceptors who dedicated their energies towards gathering devotee support for monastic activities. The Shaiva temples enshrined a Shiva linga (phallus) in the sanctum sanctorum along with images of the mother goddess and Surya (Sun god) for worship. Sometimes Vaishnava deity images were included asserting the all encompassing nature of Shiva. Nandi (a bull and attendant of Shiva) was normally enshrined in a separate pavilion facing the sanctum. The linga was man made and on occasion had etchings of Ganapati (son of Shiva) and Parvati (consort and wife of Shiva) on it. Due to the vigorous efforts of priests and ascetics, Shaiva monastic orders flourished in many places including modern Nandi Hills, Avani and Hebbata in Kolar district, Baragur and Hemavati in Tumkur district, Pemjeru, Mysore and Shimoga. Apart from these monasteries, seats of kalamukha orders existed in modern Kolar, Mysore and Tumkur districts. These orders were less visible in modern Hassan and Chikkamagaluru regions where Jainism was popular.
