= Shravandanahalli =

Coordinates: 13.6860°N 77.4254°E

- Village
- Location in Karnataka, India Shravandanahalli (India)
- Country: India
- State: Karnataka
- Region: Bayaluseeme
- District: Tumkur

Languages
  - Official: Kannada
- Time zone: UTC+5:30 (IST)
- PIN: 572127
- Telephone code: 08137
- Vehicle registration: KA-64

Shravandanahalli is a remote village in Madhugiri taluk, Tumkur district of Karnataka, India. The village is geographically linked to the Chikkaballapur district through another village called Chandanadur.
