= Avani, Kolar =

ಆವನಿ, Avani
- village
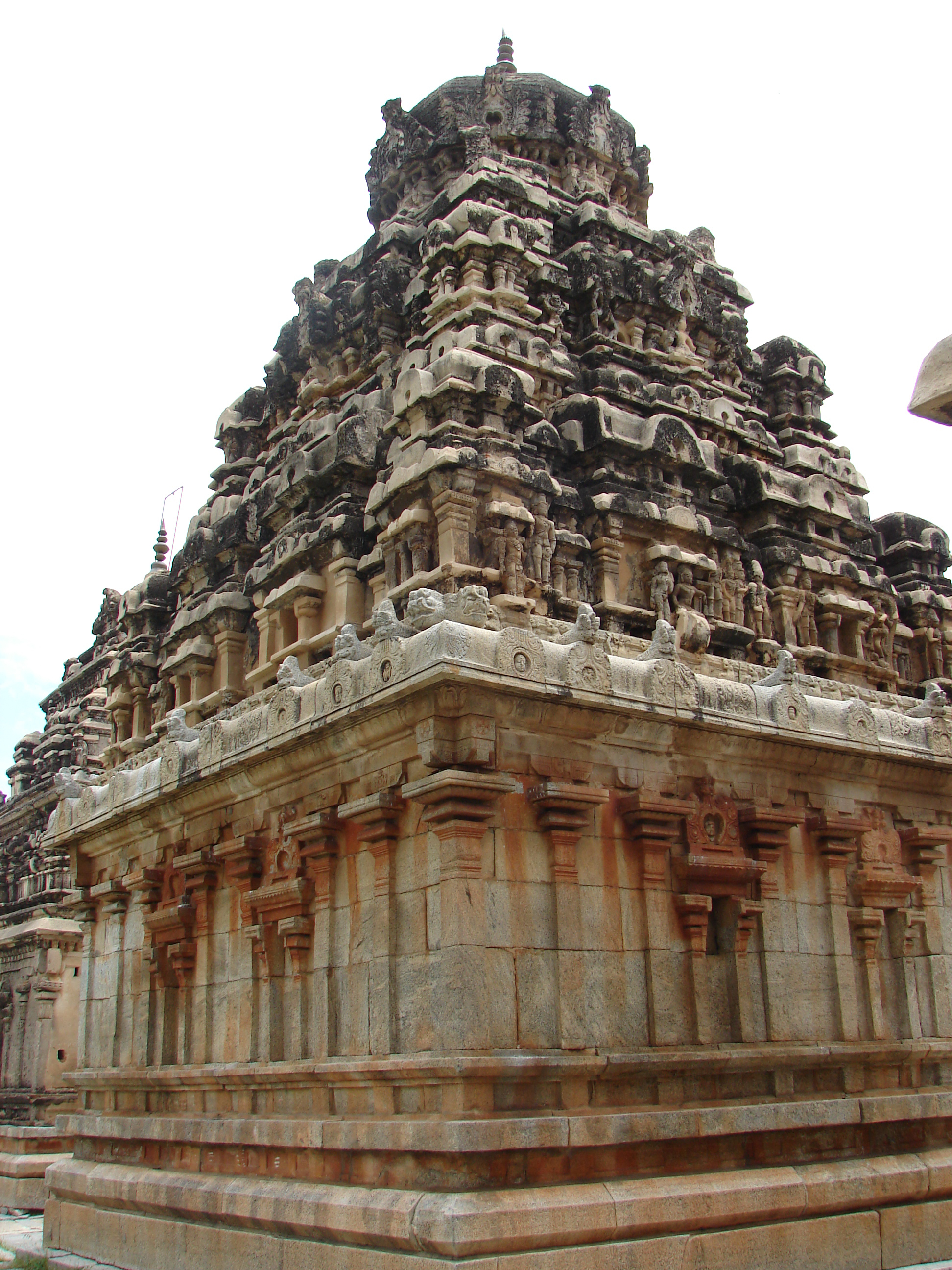
- Ramalingeshwara group of temples, Avani

- Location in Karnataka, India ಆವನಿ, Avani (India)
- Coordinates: 13.109060°N 78.3295800°E
- Country: India
- State: Karnataka
- District: ಕೋಲಾರ(Kolara) (Taluk: ಮುಳಬಾಗಿಲು Mulabaagilu)

Languages
  - Official: Kannada
- Time zone: UTC+5:30 (IST)
- Nearest city: Kolara
- Lok Sabha constituency: Kolara

Avani is a small village in Mulabaagilu taluk, Kolara district in Karnataka, India, about ten miles from Kolar Gold Fields. The village is located at 32 km from Kolara, the district centre and 13 km from Mulabaagilu, the Taluk headquarters. It is a popular location for rock climbing.

== Legend ==
Avani is known for the Sita temple situated on a hill. This temple is one of the few temples dedicated to Sitadevi in India. There is a belief that the sage Valmiki, the author of the epic Ramayana, was residing here during the period of Ramayana. Sitadevi lived here in his ashram while in exile. Sitadevi gave birth to her twin children Lava-Kusha here. Even today the room where Sita gave birth to her children exists. The war between Sri Rama and his sons Lava and Kusha happened in this village.

The Temple is also visited by a lot of childless couple. It is believed that the childless women has to take a bath in the lakshmana thirtha, then in her wet clothes she has go to the temple with a coconut and pooja ingredients. Inside the temple, she has to sleep and during her sleep she would dream about the goddess, indicating the blessings to fulfill her desires.

This hill also has the temple of 'Hari Shresta Maharshi Adi Jambava'. Avani Ramalingeshwara Jatre begins after Adi Jambava Jatre which is celebrated annually on Magha Krishna Navami before Mahashivaratri festival by Adi Jambava Community of this region. Adi Jambava is attributed to Agra Archana at this place as he is considered as Kshetra Adhipati of Avani. Jambavan is also regarded as Maharshi Jambhava, Jambu Maharshi or Jambhava Mahamuni. Jambavan gave Syamantaka to Lord Krishna. On the same occasion Lord Krishna marries Jambavati the daughter of Adi Jambav. Jambava along with his army constructed Ramsethu. Jambavan is also been associated with Jamthun village in Ratlam tahsil of Madhya Pradesh and Jambuvan Cave of Ranavav Taluk of Porbandar, Gujarat state.

Avani has ancient temples known as the Ramalingeshwara, Lakshmaneshwara, Bharateshwara and Shatrugneshwara, dating back to the period of the Nolamba Dynasty.

When Sri Narasimha Bharati IV of the Sringeri Sharada Peetham was on his sancharas, he camped here for a few days. During his stay here, in Avani, he found an idol of Goddess Sharada, in standing posture flanked by Srimajjagadguru Adi Shankaracharya and the Sri Chakra. He consecrated this idol here and established a new Matha and installed one of his shisyas as the head of the new Matha. This matha is now known as Avani Sringeri Jagadguru Shankaracharya Sharada Peetham. There is a branch of this matha in Basaveshwaranagar in Bangalore.

Avani Hills also has many attractions, such as Urulu Bande, A big bolder of rock with a little gap. It is believed that a person suffering from stomach pain or back pain can roll under this rock to get cured of the pain

There is also a Valmiki cave, where the mud inside the cave is considered to be sacred and having medical properties. You also find lock on carvings on the rocks which are considered as utensils used by Goddess sita to cook food. You can also find a spot which is believed to be the place where lava -kusha tied the horse of Ashwamedha Yajna

Source : Mysore State Gazetteer 1968

But from the actual literature history (mysore state gazetteer 1968), The Mahavalis or Brihadbanas who ruled the present Kolar and Chikkaballapur districts of Karnataka are the descendants of King Banasura or King Bana, son of Asura King Mahabali. King Brihadbana was the grandson of Mahabali. Last known ruling king of this generation was King Sambayya under Nolamba Lordship.They were in constant conflicts with Nolambas and Western Gangas of the Kolar region. They had Vaidumbas as their allies. They had the present day Avani region (a small village in Kolar District) as their capital.

They had a black flag and a bull crest as their emblem. An inscription of the period 339 CE found in Mulbagal Taluk describes all in Sanskrit and begins with the praise of Shiva whose throne is said to be on the lofty peak of the mountain called Nandi, obviously the present Nandidurga, a hill considered to be the personification of Nandi, the bull of Shiva. The inscription records the grant of the village Mudiyanur (also called Chudagrama, a Sanskritised form of Mudiyanur) to 25 Brahmins by Vadhuvallabha-Malladeva- Nandivarma, son of Vijayaditya Deva and grandson of Nandivarma, a promoter of Mahabali's dynasty. The king, who was in the town of Avanya (Avani), is said to have made the Bana dynasty prosperous and has been compared with Bodhisatva.

== Etymology ==
The name Avani means "earth". Hindu goddess Sita was also called Avanisuthe meaning 'Daughter of Earth'. The legend goes that she was found while ploughing the earth. Sutha --> Puthra, Son and Suthe --> Puthri, Daughter
