= Channarayana Durga =

Hill fort in Karnataka, India

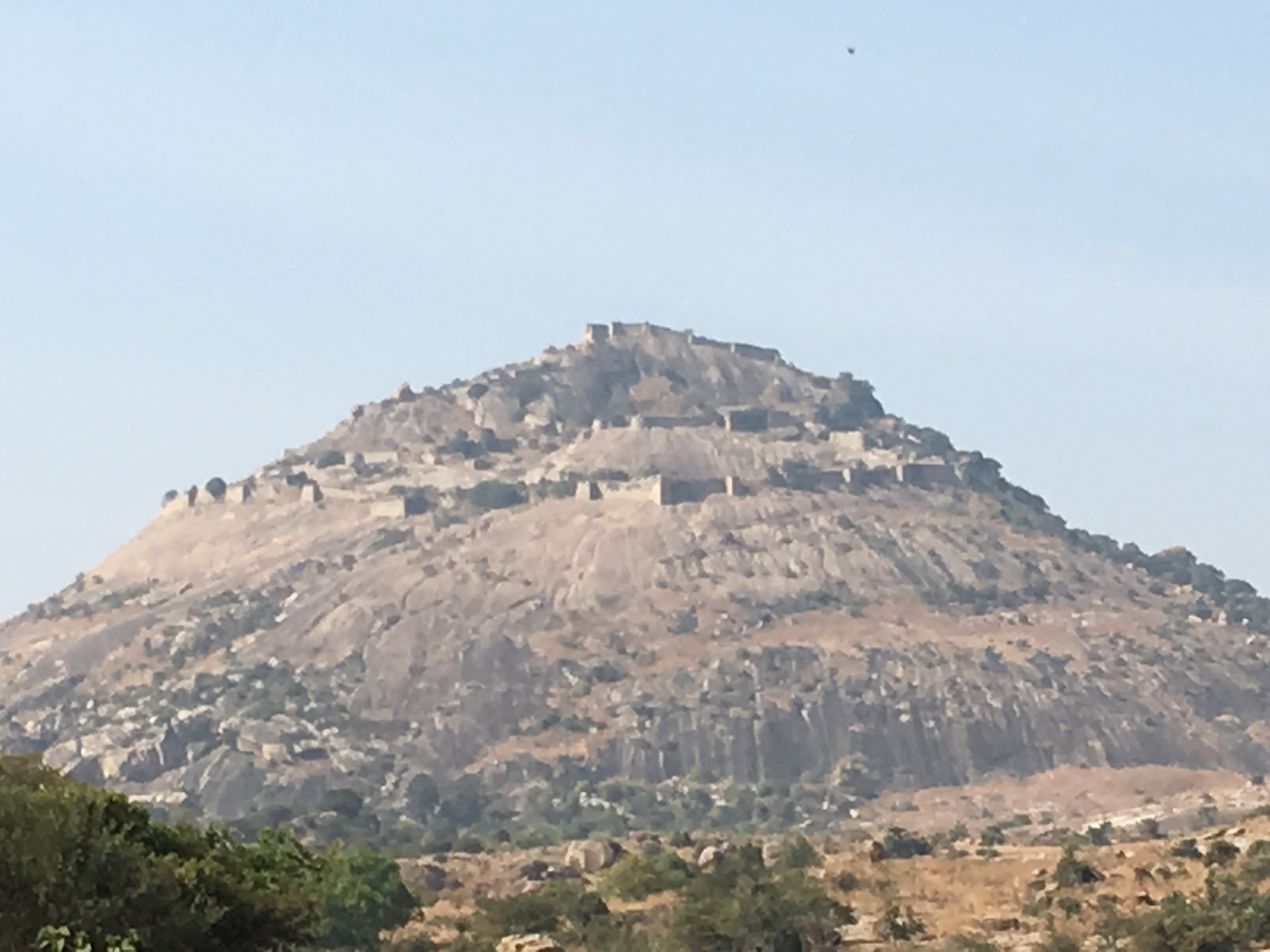
View of Channarayana Durga hill fort from a distance

Channarayana Durga is a hill fort near Madhugiri, Tumakuru district, in the Indian state of Karnataka. It is approximately 100 km from Bengaluru.

== History ==
The fort was constructed by King Paalegaara Chikkappa Gowda, the ruler of Madhugiri and surrounding areas. It is a hilltop fort near Madhugiri in Tumkur district of Karnataka. A few temples and old structures inside the fort. This is one of the ideal trekking destinations around Bangalore. Channarayana Durga was a strategic fortress during medieval times and many battles were fought to possess it. The fort was originally built by Channapa Gouda in the 17th-century, a feudal lord from Madhugiri. Later the fort fell into the hands of the Marathas, but continued to pass back and forth between Marathas and Mysore Wodeyars. The British took over the fort during third Mysore war and then abandoned it.

== Trek ==
The Channarayana Durga trek is classified as moderate. During monsoon, this trek is difficult. The trek to Channarayana Durga is quite interesting and few tourists visit. The trek takes about a half day and reaches. The elevation is 3,730 feet

== Image gallery ==
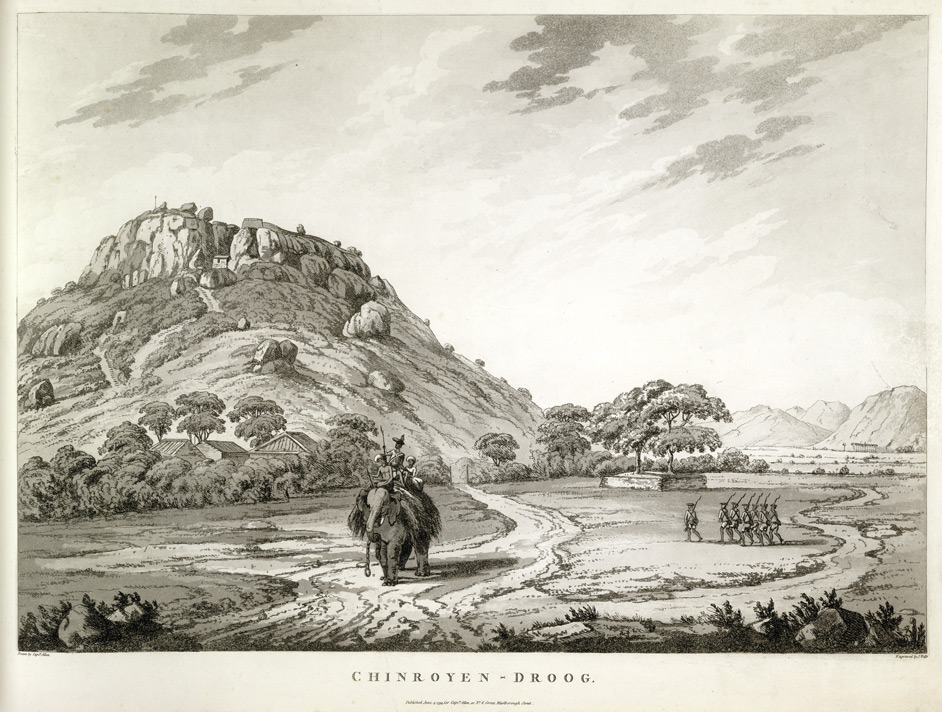
Chinroyen-Droog, as drawn by Alexander Allan ca. 1792

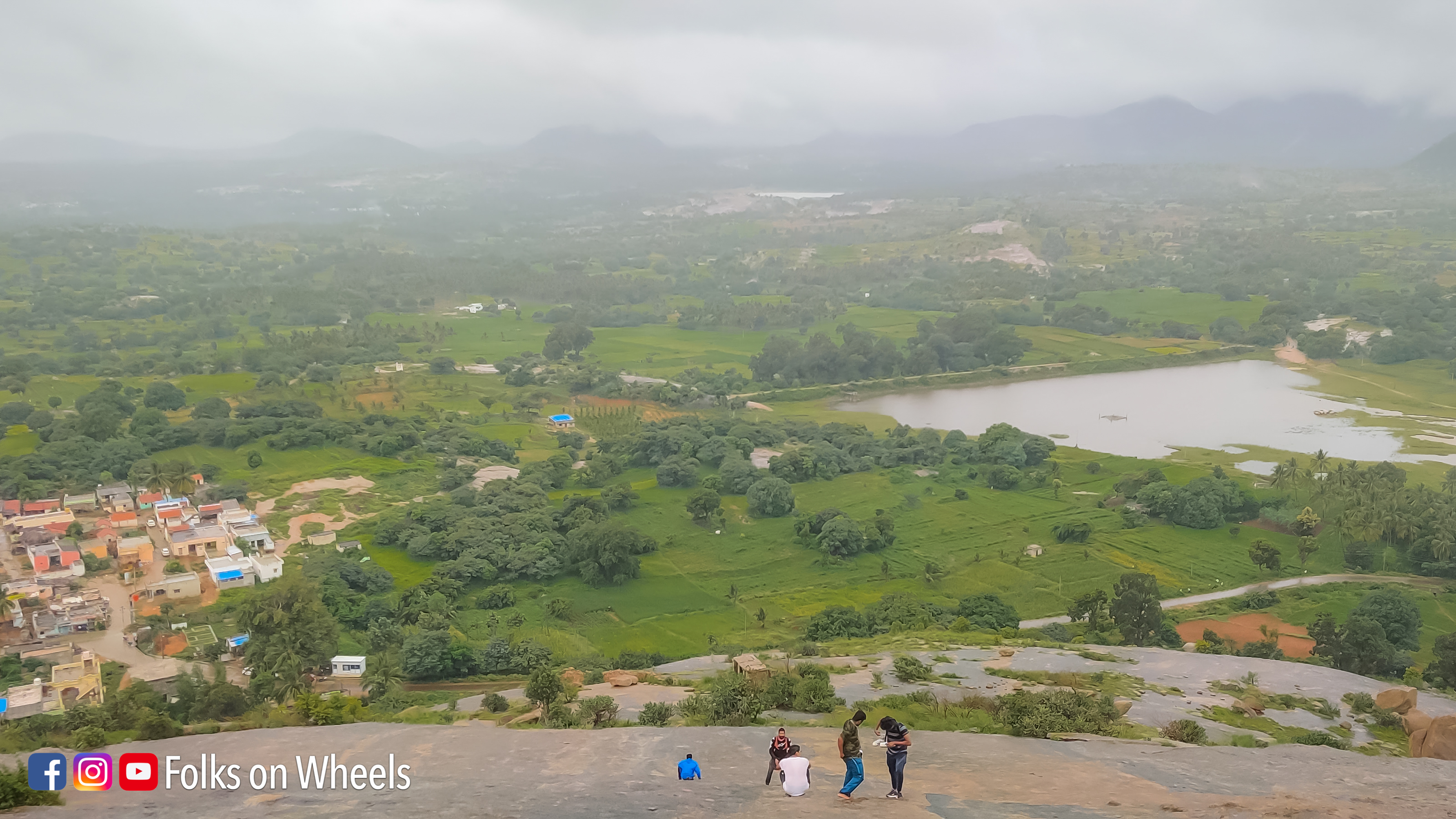
View from the summit

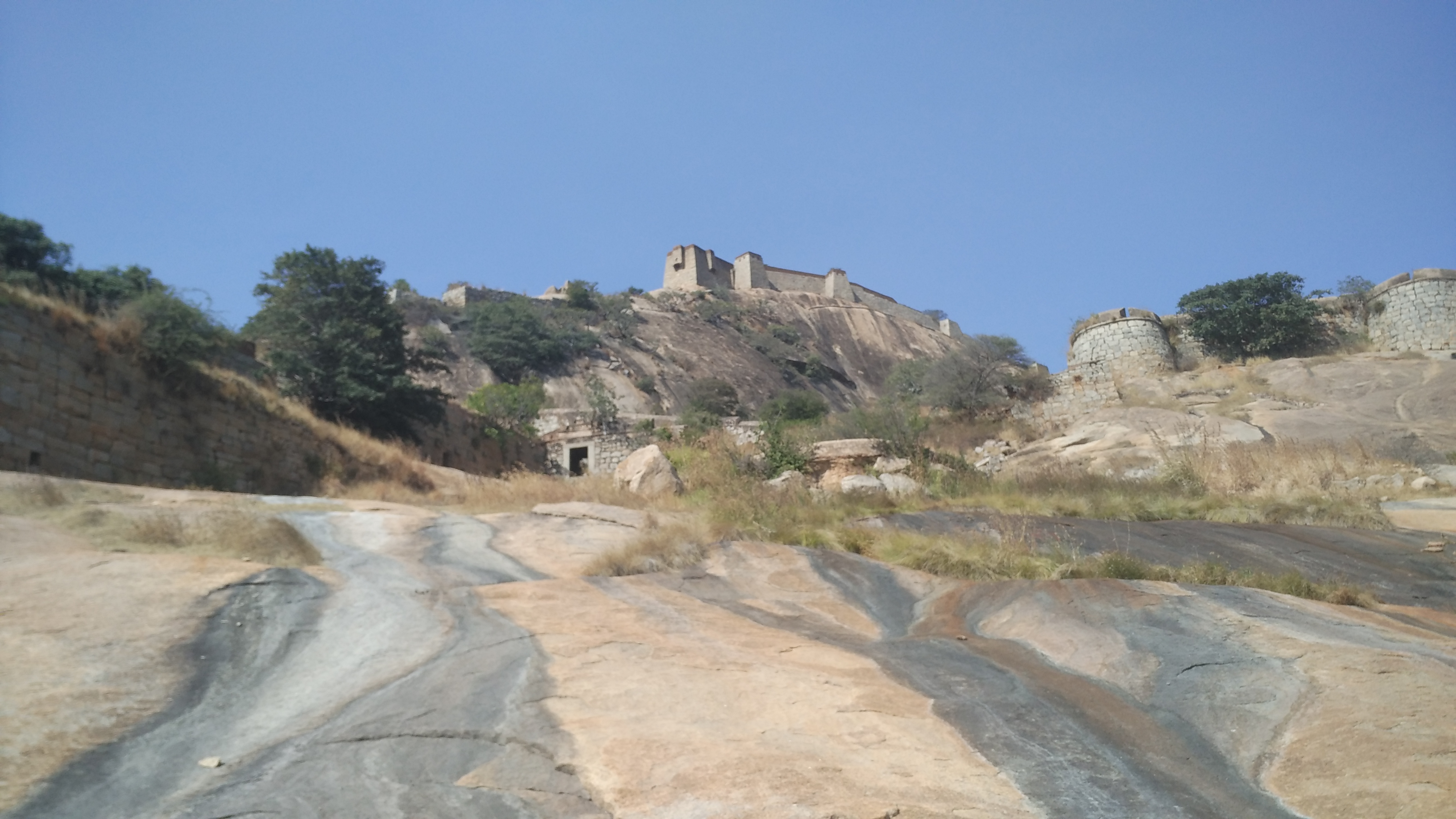
Channarayanadurga hill fort

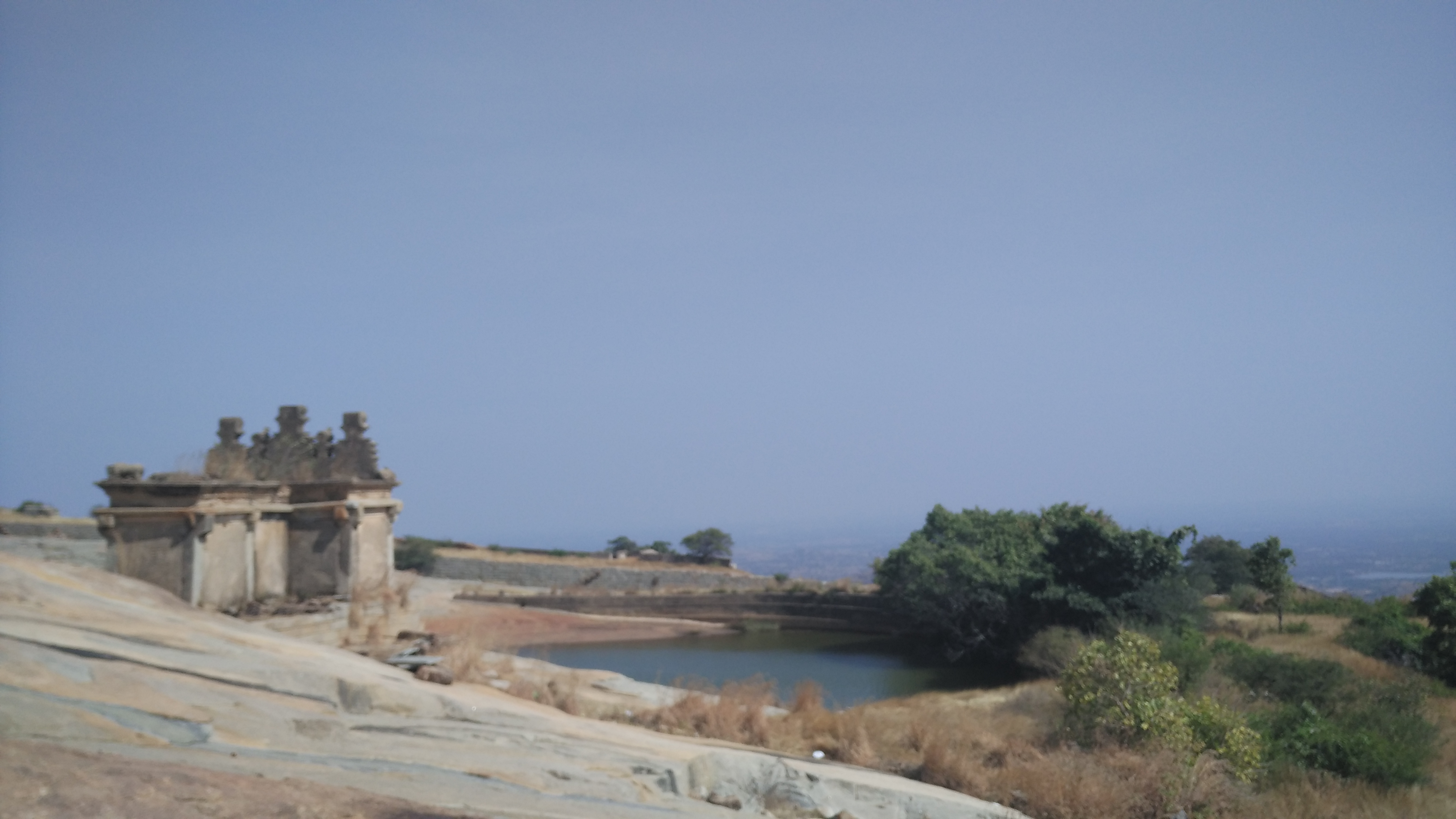

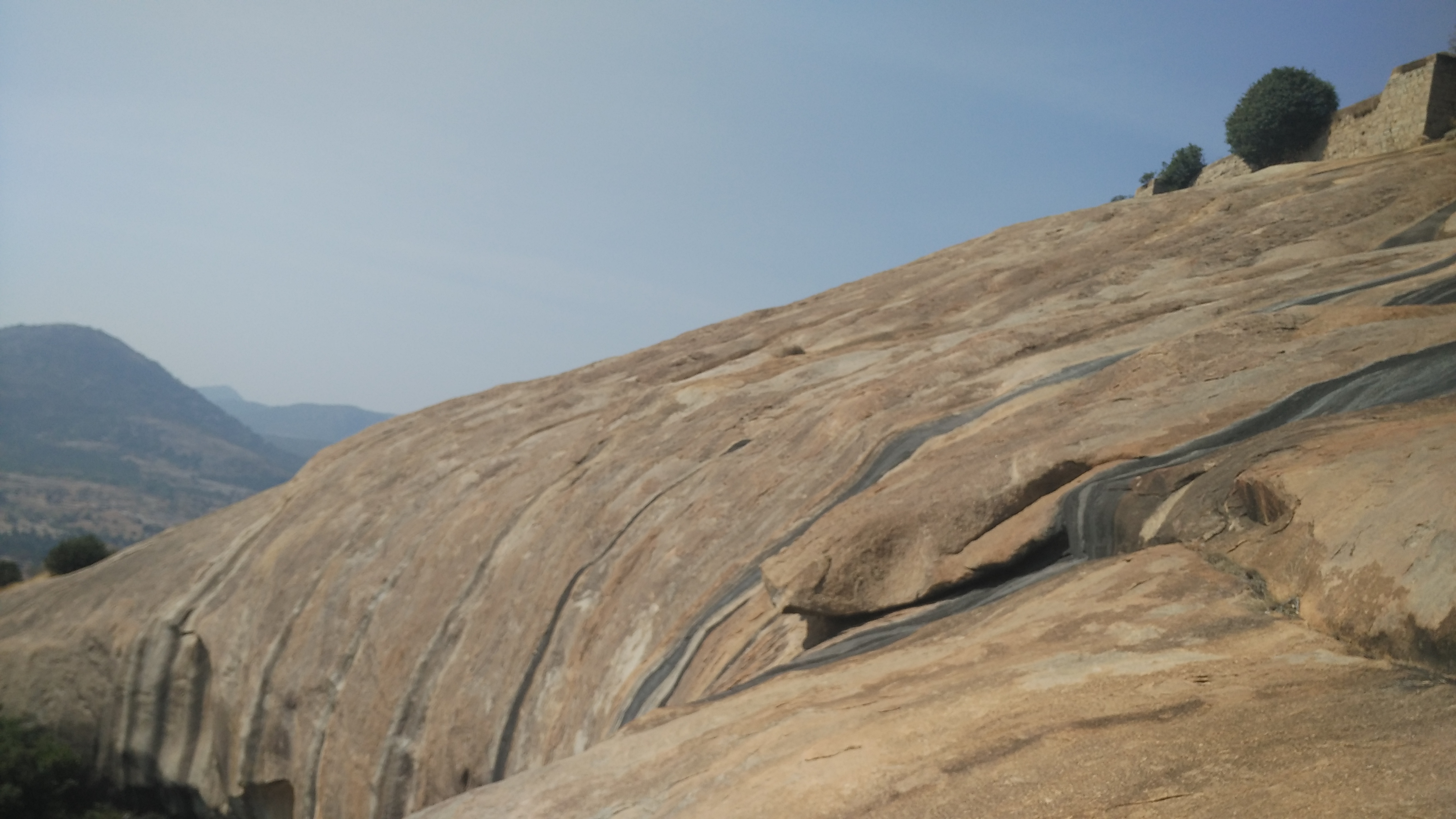

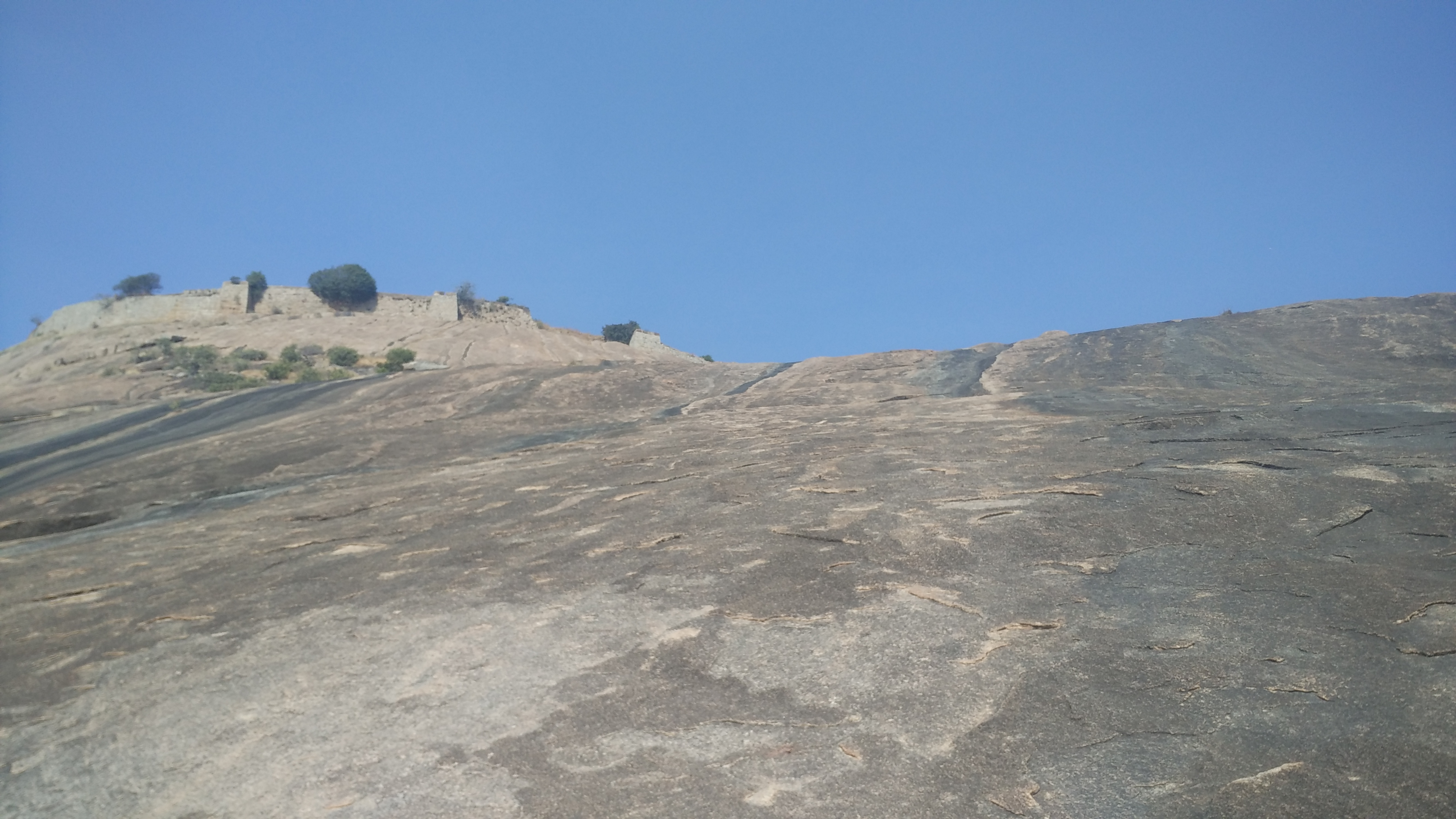

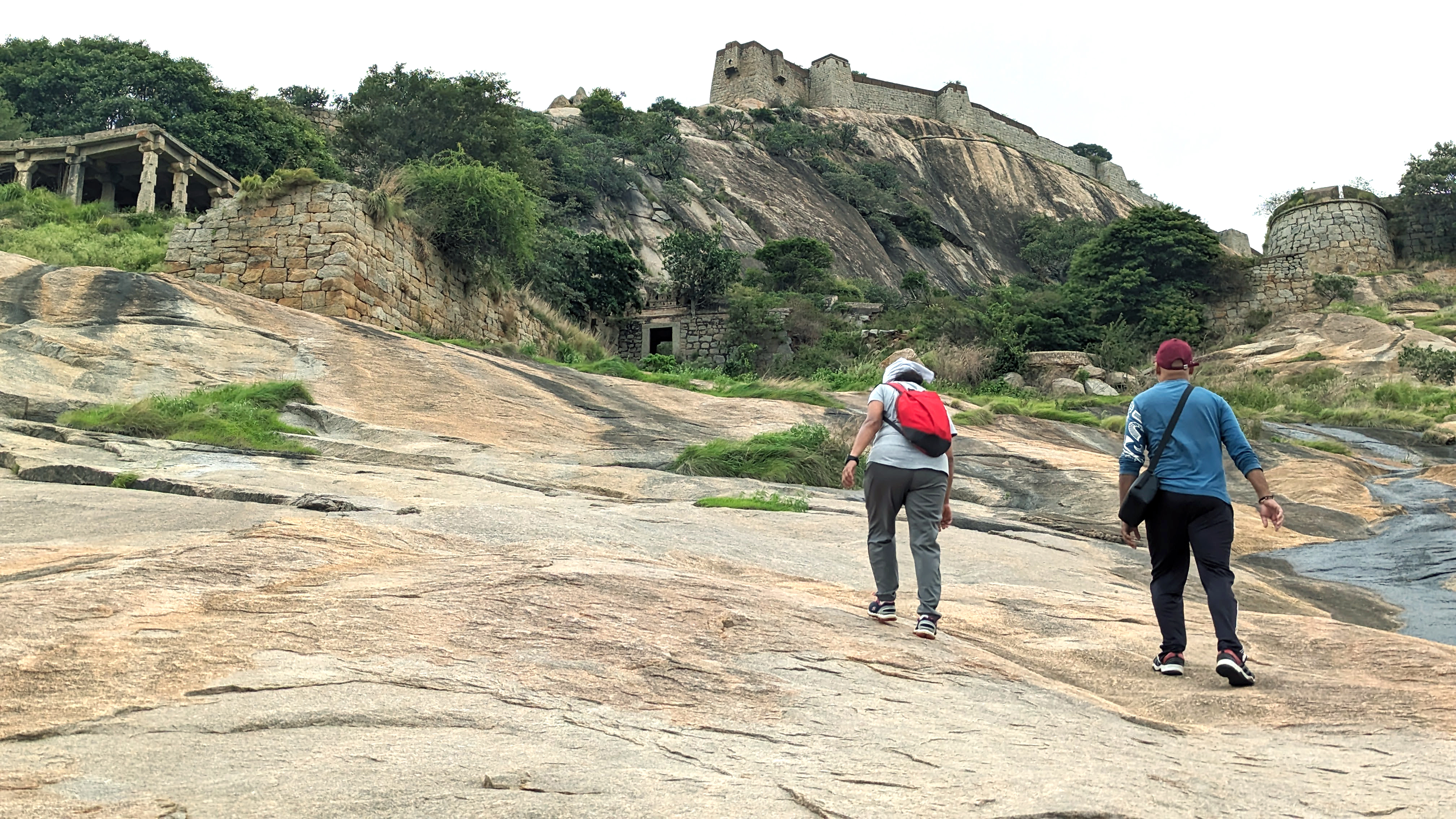
Channarayana Durga Fort

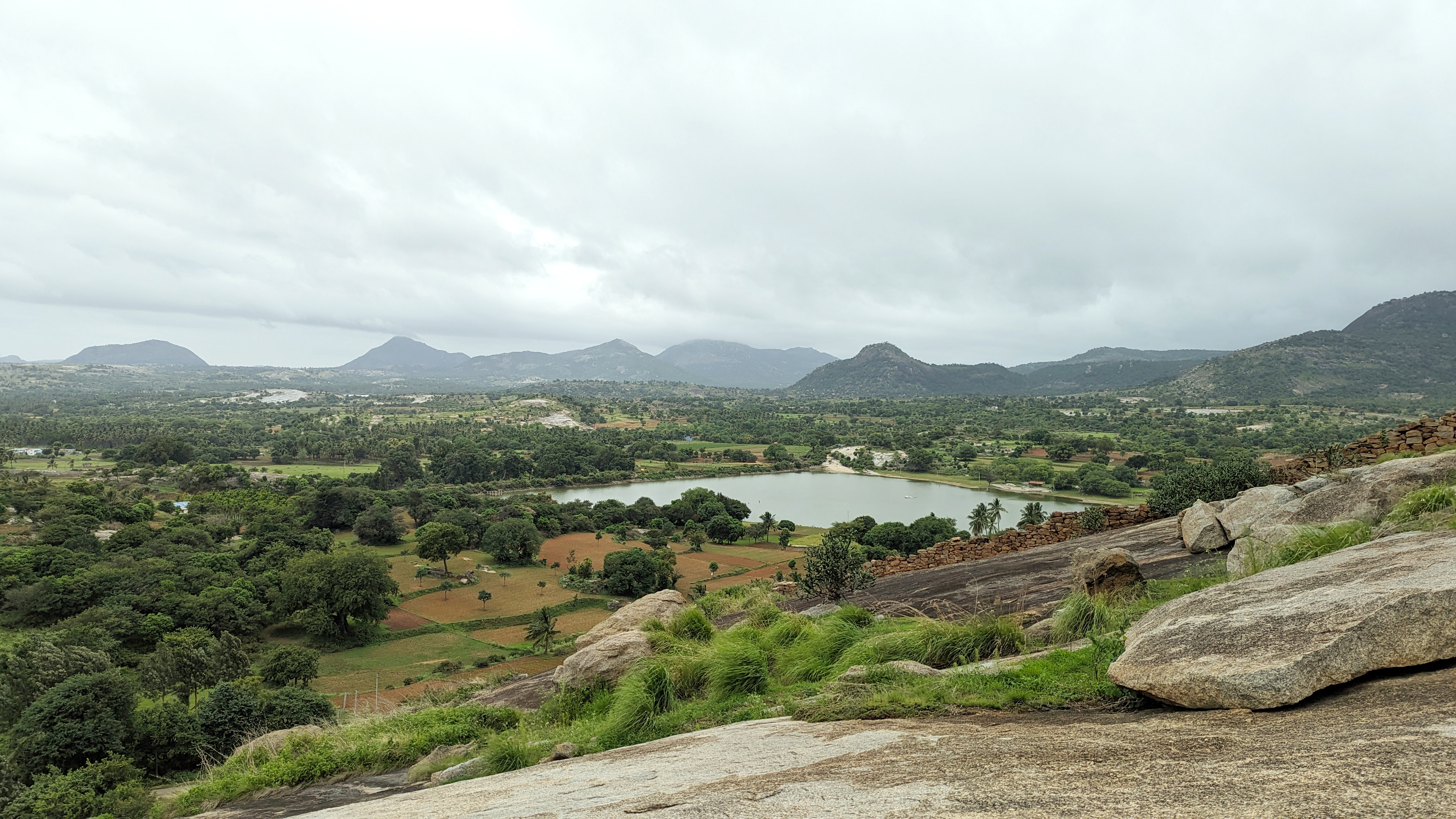
Channarayana Durga fort summit view

== Sources ==
1. https://www.deccanherald.com/content/242468/legends-midigeshi-durga.html
