= Ardhagiri =

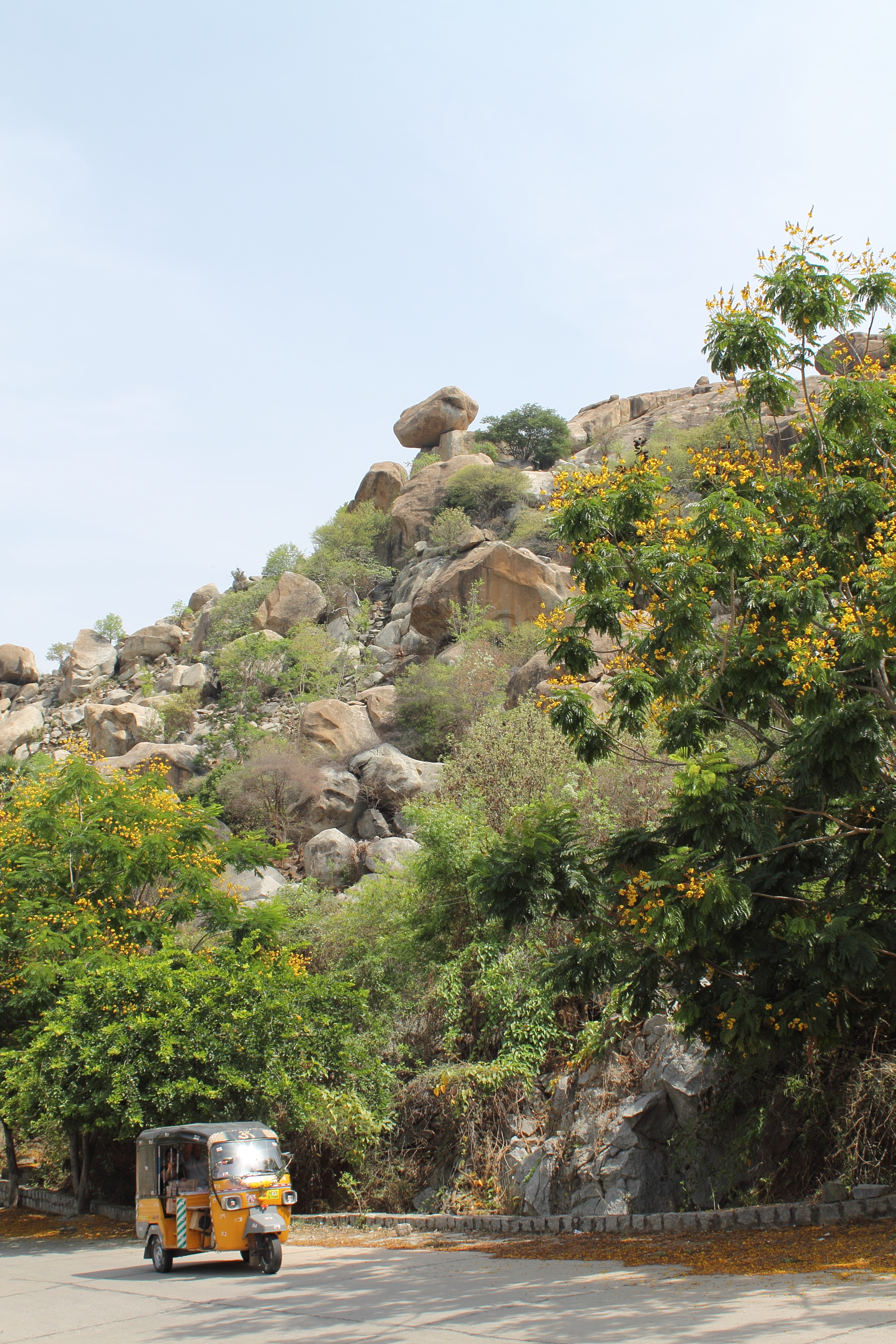
- Ardhagiri Hill

Highest point
- Coordinates: 13°17′41″N 78°57′05″E

Geography
- Location within Andhra Pradesh
- Location: Aragonda, Chittoor district, Andhra Pradesh, India

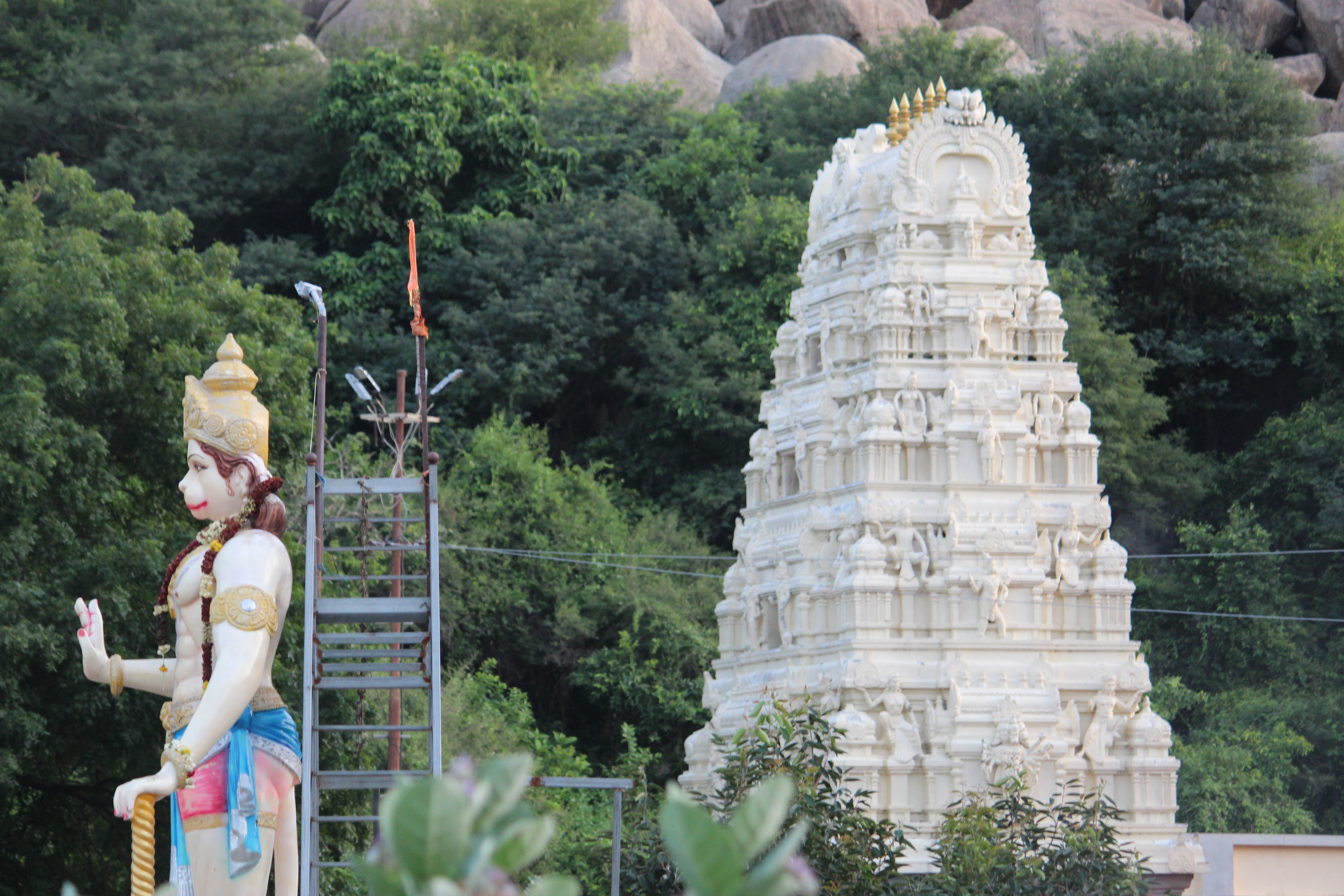
Ardhagiri Hanuman Temple

Ardhagiri is a hill where Hanuman temple is located. The hill is situated in Aragonda village of Chittoor district in the Indian state of Andhra Pradesh.

== History of the temple ==
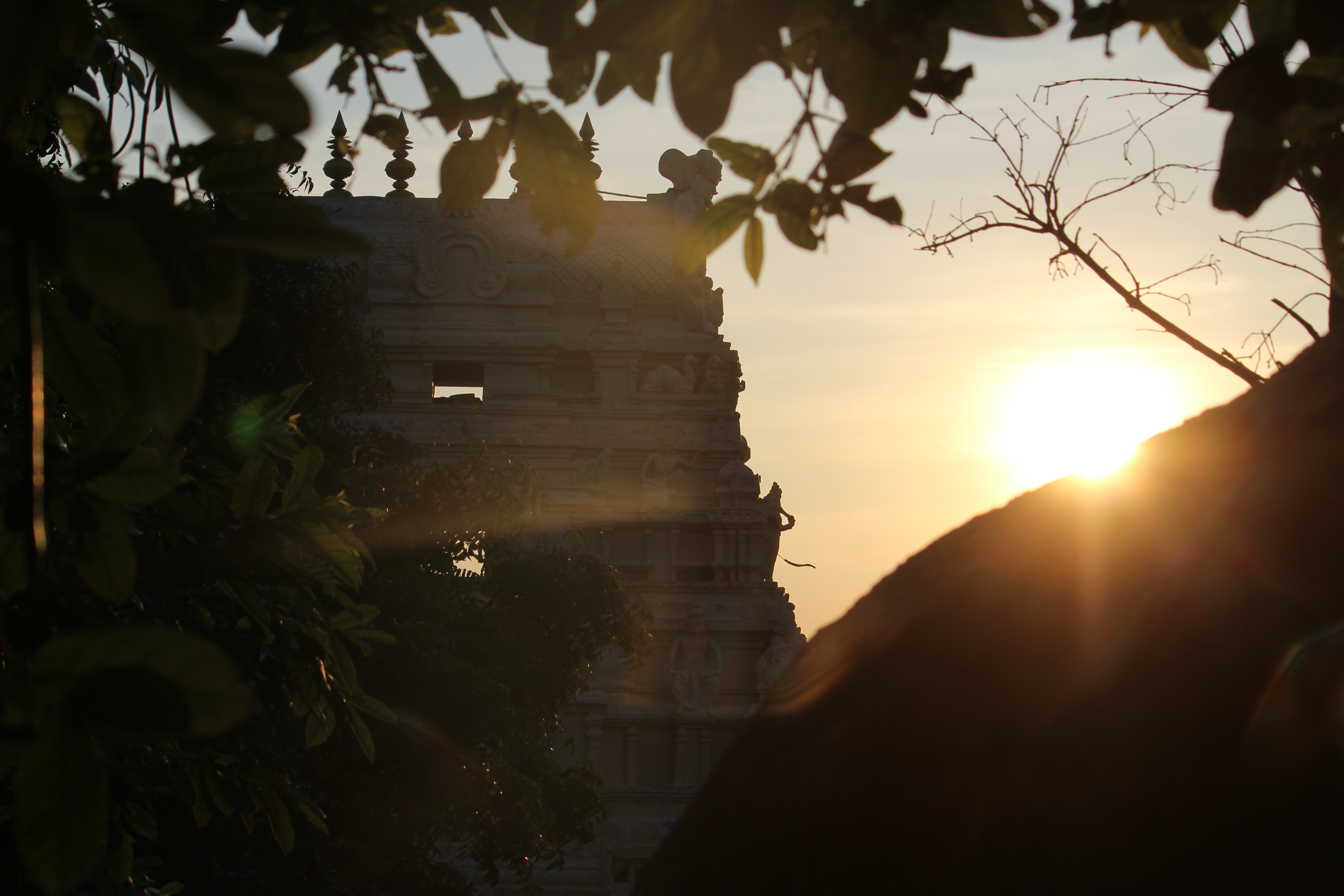
Ardhagiri Temple Gopuram

The name Ardhagiri came from an incident related to Treta Yuga, when Lord Hanuman was transporting dronagiri Mountain (mountain that consists of herbs for life), in night time bharat brother of lord ram thought that some mountain is going to hurt; immediately he shot an arrow on hanuman. Due to its effect, half of the mountain fell down at this place and hence, the name Ardhagiri. In the local language, it means Half Mountain (Ardha=half, giri=mountain). From then, people started worshipping hanuman in the name of veera anjaneya swamy. Many people, till today, come from all the world to collect the medicated water in the pond, besides to the temple. The clay in the mountain contains many medicinal properties and has a power to cure many types of skin problems. The water in the pond comes from different place from the mountain, touching many roots of medicinal plants.
