= Madhugiri =

- City
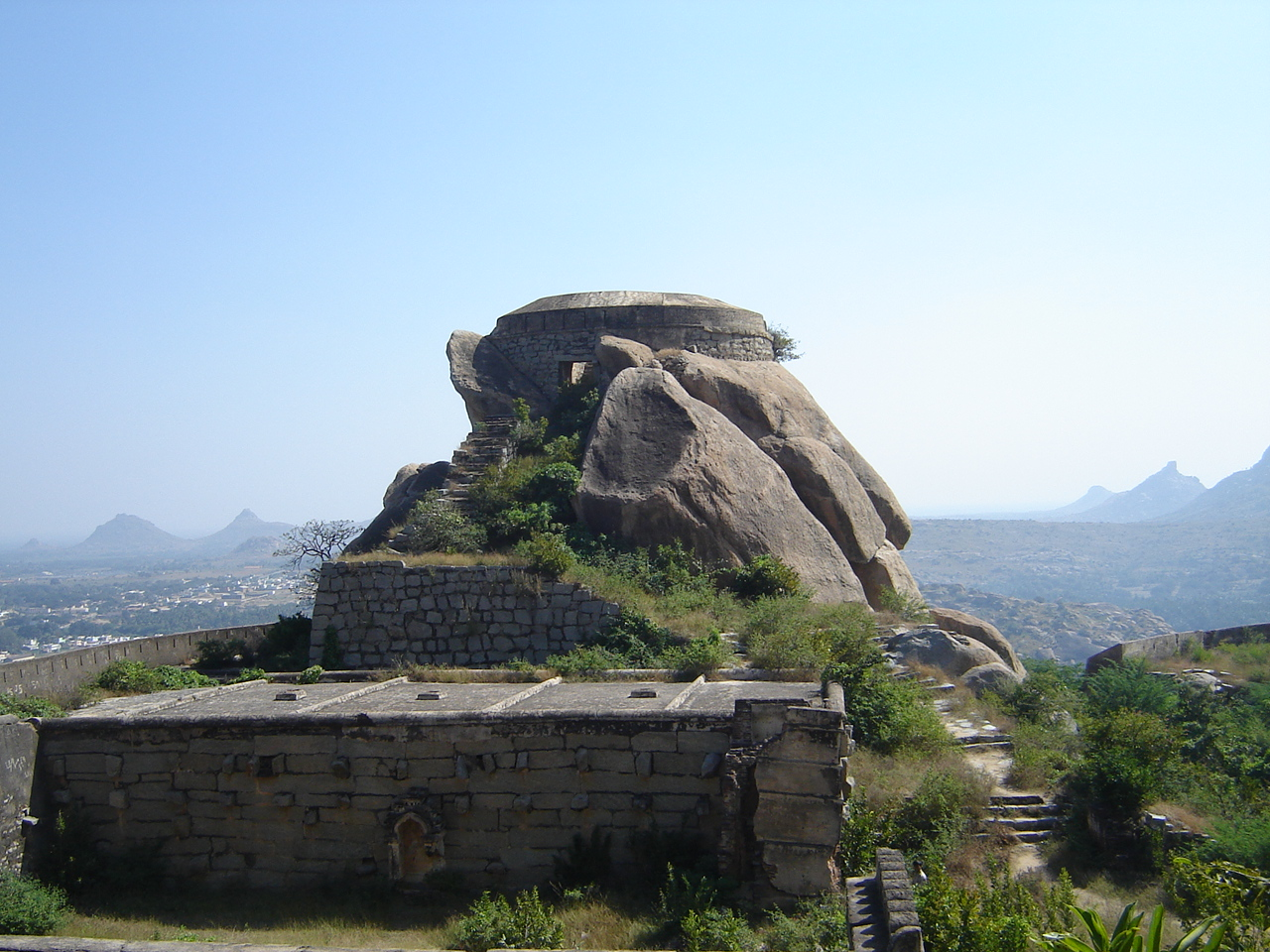
- Madhugiri Fort

- Location in Karnataka, India
- Coordinates: 13.66°N 77.21°E
- Country: India
- State: Karnataka
- District: Tumakuru

Government
  - Type: municipal council
- Elevation: 787 m (2,582 ft)

Population (2001)
  - Total: 29,215

Languages
  - Official: Kannada
- Time zone: UTC+5:30 (IST)
- PIN: 572132
- Vehicle registration: KA-64
- Website: http://www.madhugiritown.mrc.gov.in/en

Madhugiri is a city in Tumkur district in the Indian state of Karnataka. The city derives its name from a hillock, Madhu-giri (honey-hill) which lies to its south. Madhugiri is one of the 34 educational districts of the Karnataka state.

== Geography ==
Madhugiri is located at 13.66°N 77.21°E. It has an average elevation of 787 metres (2582 feet).

Madhugiri Fort lies in Madhugiri which is in the Tumkur district in the State of Karnataka. Madhu-giri is a single hill and the second largest monolith in entire Asia. The city is at a distance of 110 kilometres (68 mi) from Bengaluru and is famous for its fort and temples. Many tourists go to Madhugiri to visit the fort, which is famous for its architecture. The fort, perched atop the steep slope of a hill, was built by the Vijayanagar Dynasty.

== Demographics ==
As of 2001 India census, Madhugiri had a population of 29,215. Males constitute 52% of the population and females 48%. Madhugiri has an average literacy rate of 72%, higher than the national average of 59.5%: male literacy is 77%, and female literacy is 67%. In Madhugiri, 11% of the population is under 6 years of age.

=== Notable People born here ===
- M. S. Ramaiah - Philanthropist, Educationist and Industrialist (b. 1922; d. 1997)
- Arjun Sarja - Film actor working mainly in Kannada & Tamil films (b. 1962)
- Doddarangegowda an Indian poet and lyricist working in Kannada cinema (b. 1946) [2]

== Dandina Maramma Temple ==
Dandina Maramma Temple is a prominent Shakti shrine situated at the southern entrance of Madhugiri town in Tumakuru district. The temple is dedicated to goddess Dandina Maramma, who is regarded locally as a protective mother-deity of the region. In January 2025, the temple’s traditional teppotsava (boat festival) was revived after nearly five decades, drawing large crowds from surrounding towns and villages. The temple is also noted for its ornate entrance carvings and traditional sculptures, including depictions of Chandikeshwari and the demon Mahishasura.

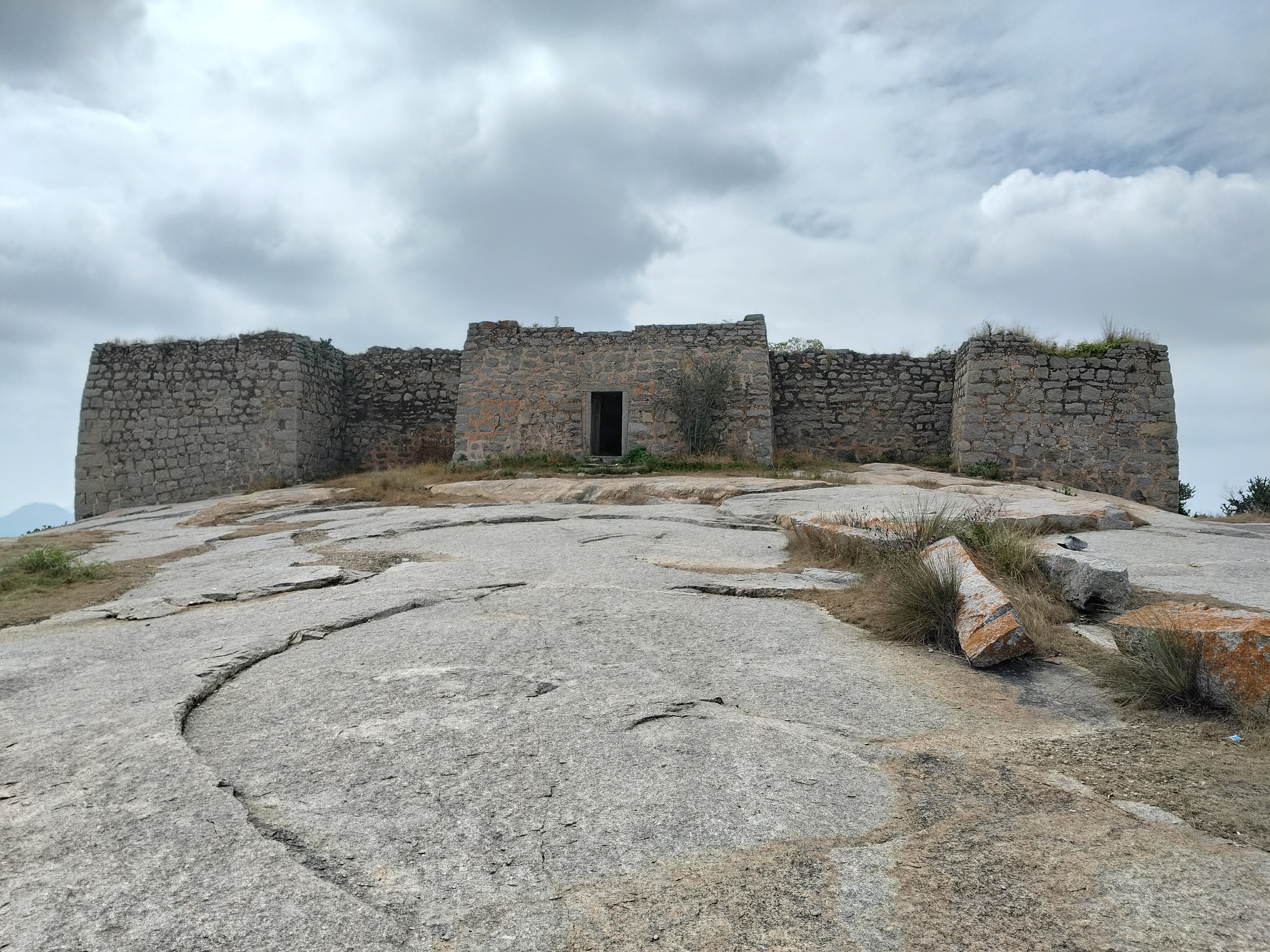
Entrance gateway of Madhugiri Fort at the summit of Madhugiri hill, Karnataka, India.

== See also ==
- Channarayana Durga
- Tumkur District
- Taluks of Karnataka
- Shravandanahalli
