= Srivikrama =

- King of the Western Ganga Dynasty
- Reign: c. 629–654 CE
- Predecessor: Polavira
- Successor: Bhuvikrama
- Dynasty: Ganga Dynasty
- Father: Mushkara
- Religion: Jainism

Srivikrama (reigned c. 629–654 CE) was a king of the Western Ganga dynasty of southern India. He ascended the throne after his brother or predecessor Polavira and continued the dynasty's tradition of Jain patronage. Historical records describe him as learned in all fourteen vidyās (branches of knowledge) and skilled in political administration.

== Reign ==
Srivikrama ruled during a period of stability under the suzerainty of the Badami Chalukyas. His reign is less well documented than earlier rulers, but inscriptions and later chronicles emphasize his scholarly abilities and support for Jain learning.

== Religion and Patronage ==
Like his predecessors, Srivikrama was a patron of Jainism. Chroniclers note that he was deeply versed in all fourteen traditional branches of learning, reflecting Jain scholastic values. Although specific inscriptions from his reign have not yet surfaced, the uninterrupted pattern of land grants and temple support under Mushkara and Polavira strongly suggests that Srivikrama continued the dynasty's religious patronage.

== Succession ==
Srivikrama was succeeded by his son Bhuvikarma, also known as "Monovinita" or "Srivallabha". Bhuvikarma's rule marked continued greater independence for the Gangas.

== See also ==
• Western Ganga dynasty

• Polavira

== Bibliography ==
• “Western Ganga dynasty template 2023.” Wikipedia. Accessed 2025.

• Story of Kannada (2015). Legends of Ganga Dynasty Origin.

• Threadreader (2021). “Part 7: The Gangas.” Little Deccan Series.
