= Bhuvikrama =

Bhuvikrama (Monovinita / Śrī‑Vallabha)
- Maharaja of the Western Ganga Dynasty
- Reign: c. 604 – 635 CE
- Predecessor: Srivikrama
- Successor: Shivamara I
- Dynasty: Ganga dynasty
- Religion: Jainism

Bhuvikrama (also known as Monovinita or Śrī‑Vallabha) was a king of the Western Ganga dynasty ruling parts of southern Karnataka in the early 7th century CE. He succeeded his father Mushkara and was succeeded by his son Shivamara I.

== Reign ==
Few inscriptions from Bhuvikrama's time survive, but he is listed in later Ganga genealogies and epigraphy. His reign likely covered Talakad and surrounding regions, continuing the dynasty's Jain patronage and support for temple building. Alternate spellings like *Bhuvikarma* appear in some records and are treated as scribal variants.

== Legacy ==
Bhuvikrama's rule marked continuity in the early Western Ganga line. His descendants such as Srivikrama and Shivamara I furthered Jain religious and administrative traditions in Karnataka.

== Bibliography ==
• Nagarajaiah, Hampa. (2019). "Jainism in Early Kannada Literature." International Journal of Economic Perspectives, Vol. 13(4), pp. 32–43.

• Settar, S. (1989). Jaina Art and Architecture, Vol. 2. Delhi: Agam Kala Prakashan.

• Derrett, J. Duncan M. (1999). Religion, Law and the State in India. Delhi: Oxford University Press.
