= Polavira =

- King of the Western Ganga Dynasty
- Reign: c. 604 – c. 630 CE
- Predecessor: Mushkara
- Successor: Shivamara I
- Dynasty: Ganga Dynasty
- Father: Mushkara
- Religion: Jainism

Polavira (r. c. 604 – c. 630 CE) was a ruler of the Western Ganga dynasty of ancient Karnataka. He succeeded his father Mushkara and continued the dynasty's consolidation of power in the southern Deccan region. Although not as well documented as his predecessors, inscriptions confirm that Polavira maintained the dynasty's political stability and supported religious institutions, particularly Jainism.

== Reign ==
Polavira's reign followed that of his father Mushkara, who had successfully defended Ganga autonomy after the decline of Kadamba dominance. During Polavira's rule, the Gangas continued to act as feudatories to the early Chalukyas of Badami. Some epigraphic evidence indicates that Polavira issued land grants and maintained a close relationship with Jain monastic orders.

== Religious Affiliation ==
Like his predecessors, Polavira is believed to have been a patron of Jainism. Inscriptions from this period suggest continued endowments to Jain temples and support for Jain acharyas. His reign contributed to the cultural flourishing of Jain art and architecture in early medieval Karnataka.

== Succession ==
Polavira was succeeded by Srivikrama, under whom the Western Gangas began to play a more assertive role in regional politics. Shivamara I's rule marks the transition toward greater independence, even as the dynasty remained loosely aligned with the Badami Chalukyas.

== See also ==
• Western Ganga dynasty

• Mushkara

== Bibliography ==
• Settar, S. (1989). Jaina Art and Architecture, Vol. 2. Delhi: Agam Kala Prakashan. p. 94. ISBN 9788170770214.

• Epigraphia Carnatica, Vol. II. Mysore: Department of Archaeology. pp. 154, 160.
