= Simhanandi =

Digambar Jain monk and spiritual teacher

Acharya Simhanandi

Personal life
- Born: Unknown Karnataka (traditional accounts)
- Died: Unknown Karnataka
- Known for: Establishing and guiding the Western Ganga dynasty

Religious life
- Religion: Jainism
- Order: Jain monk

Simhanandi or Acharya Simhanandi was a Digambar Jain monk and spiritual teacher traditionally credited with establishing and guiding the Western Ganga dynasty in southern India during the 4th century CE. He is remembered for his role in shaping the dynasty's administration and religious patronage, particularly in the spread of Jainism in the region.

== Role in the Ganga dynasty ==
According to Jain tradition, Simhanandi initiated two brothers, Adhava and Dadiga, into the responsibilities of kingship and encouraged them to establish a new ruling line, which became the Western Ganga dynasty. He is said to have blessed them with a sword and a flag marked with the figure of a lion, symbolizing courage and dharma.

Simhanandi's influence ensured that the early Ganga rulers maintained strong ties with Jainism, granting patronage to Jain monks, temples, and scholars. Several later inscriptions credit him with laying the foundation for the dynasty's religious orientation.

== Legacy ==
Simhanandi is regarded as one of the most important Jain ācāryas of early medieval Karnataka. His role in the establishment of the Gangas is frequently cited in Jain literary sources and regional histories. The dynasty he helped guide became notable patrons of Jainism, commissioning monuments, temples, and supporting Jain scholars for centuries.
