= Mushkara =

- Maharaja
- Reign: c. 579–604 CE
- Predecessor: Durvinita
- Successor: Shivamara I
- Dynasty: Western Ganga Dynasty
- Religion: Jainism

Mushkara (IAST: Muṣkara) was a ruler of the Western Ganga dynasty who reigned from approximately 579 to 604 CE. He succeeded his father, Durvinita, and continued the dynasty's policies of regional consolidation, religious patronage, and literary encouragement.

== Reign ==
Mushkara ascended the throne after Durvinita's long and culturally vibrant reign. While less is known about his rule compared to his predecessor, inscriptions suggest a period of political continuity and administrative stability in the Gangavadi region (southern Karnataka).

He is mentioned in several inscriptions as a Maharaja who maintained the family's territorial integrity and supported Jain institutions. The Ganga inscriptions during this period also hint at ongoing conflicts and diplomacy with neighboring powers, including the Pallavas and Kadambas.

== Religious Patronage ==
Like many of his Ganga predecessors, Mushkara was a patron of Jainism. Contemporary inscriptions refer to land grants and support extended to Jain monks and temples during his reign. The continuity of Jain influence from Durvinita’s era into Mushkara's reign is considered a key feature of Ganga court life in the late 6th century.

According to scholar S. Settar, Jain values significantly shaped courtly culture, including notions of ahimsa (non-violence) and asceticism, which were particularly encouraged by Ganga kings such as Mushkara.

== Legacy ==
Although overshadowed by his father Durvinita and his successor Shivamara I, Mushkara helped preserve the stability of the Western Ganga realm during a formative transitional period. His reign is often seen as a bridge between two notable phases of Ganga history—Durvinita’s cultural expansion and Shivamara's assertion against the growing powers of the Badami Chalukyas.

== See also ==
- Durvinita
- Western Ganga Dynasty
- Jainism in Karnataka
