= Adhava and Dadiga =

Legendary ancestral figures in India

Adhava and Dadiga (also spelled Madhāva and Dādiga by modern scholars) are legendary ancestral figures associated with the foundation of the Western Ganga dynasty, which ruled parts of southern India—particularly the Gangavadi region (modern southern Karnataka)—between the 4th and 10th centuries CE. They are frequently mentioned in later Ganga inscriptions and genealogical traditions as the progenitors or symbolic founders of the dynasty.

== Traditional account ==
According to legend, Adhava and Dadiga were noble brothers who migrated from northern India to the south and established themselves in the Gangavadi region. The dynasty claimed descent from the Ikshvaku dynasty of Ayodhya, linking their lineage to the ancient Solar dynasty. The brothers are said to have founded the Western Ganga dynasty under the guidance and blessings of the Digambar Jain monk Simhanandi (also spelled Simhanandi Acharya), who ordained them and provided a sword to establish righteous Jain rule in the region.

Their migration is sometimes symbolically associated with the southern journey of Jain monk Bhadrabahu and Emperor Chandragupta Maurya to Shravanabelagola in the 3rd century BCE. Although not chronologically accurate, this tradition emphasizes the dynasty's deep Jain connections from its inception.

== Historiographical perspective ==
Modern historians regard Adhava and Dadiga as mythological or symbolic figures representing dynastic origin myths rather than historical rulers. The first historically attested Ganga king is Kongunivarma Madhava I, who ruled around c. 350 CE, as confirmed by the Talagunda pillar inscription.

Notably, Dadiga is also the name of a 10th-century Ganga ruler—Rachamalla IV Dadiga, who ruled under Rashtrakuta overlordship—but this later Dadiga is not to be confused with the legendary figure from the dynasty’s origin traditions.

== Legacy ==
Although not mentioned in early epigraphs, Adhava and Dadiga appear in later inscriptions and literary traditions as noble founders. Their association with the Jain monk Simhanandi and the Ikshvaku dynasty reflects religious and political strategies of royal legitimization, especially through Jain traditions prevalent in early medieval Karnataka.

== See also ==
- Western Ganga dynasty
- Simhanandi
- Shravanabelagola
- Bhadrabahu
- Chandragupta Maurya
