= Rameshvara Temple, Narasamangala =

Rameshvara Temple
- Hindu temple
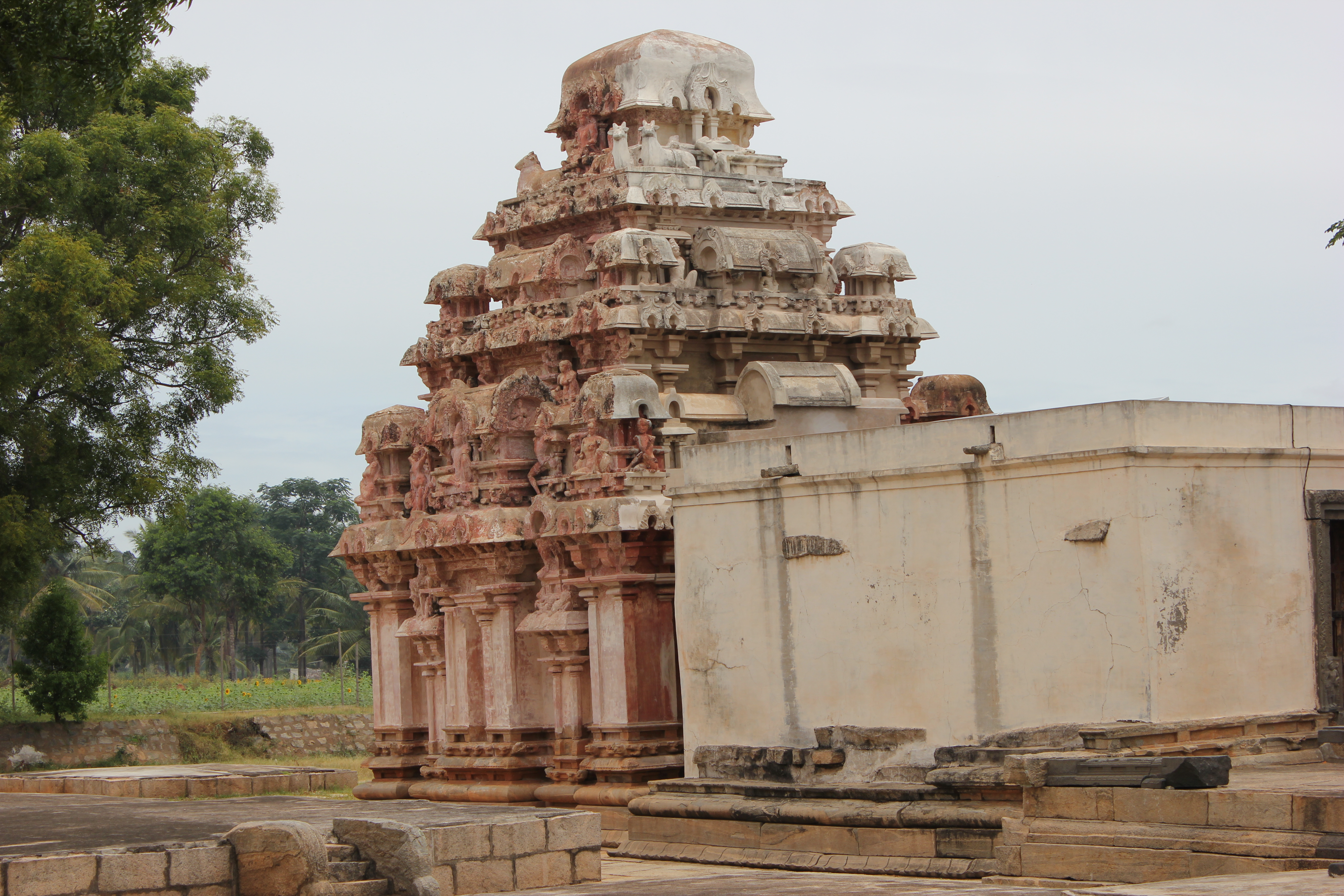
- View of Rameshvara temple (9th century A.D.)
- Country: India
- State: Karnataka
- District: Chamarajanagar District

Languages
  - Official: Kannada
- Time zone: UTC+5:30 (IST)

The Rameshvara Temple (also spelt Rameshwara or Ramesvara) is located in the town of Narasamangala of Chamarajanagar district, Karnataka state, India. The temple was constructed during the 9th century rule of the Western Ganga Dynasty of Talakad.

== Temple plan ==
The temple plan is simple, yet it has a unique superstructure (tower or shikara) that is made of brick and stucco. The vimana (shrine with tower) is eleven meters tall and stands on a platform of moldings (called adhishthana) that is two meters high. It has a sanctum (garbhagriha), a narrow closed hall (ardhamantapa or just inner mantapa), a large closed hall (mahamantapa). The architecture is fundamentally dravidian in style. Some of the remarkable sculptures in the temple include that of Nataraj (a form of the Hindu god Shiva), saptamatrikas (the seven Hindu goddesses) and the Ganga king seated in state with his queen by his side.

The temple received patronage from the later day Hoysala Empire kings as well. This is attested to by the two Kannada language inscriptions tablets (1291-1343 A.D) on the site that describes grants made by King Veera Ballala III to the local deity Ramanathadeva of Narasamangala.

== Gallery ==
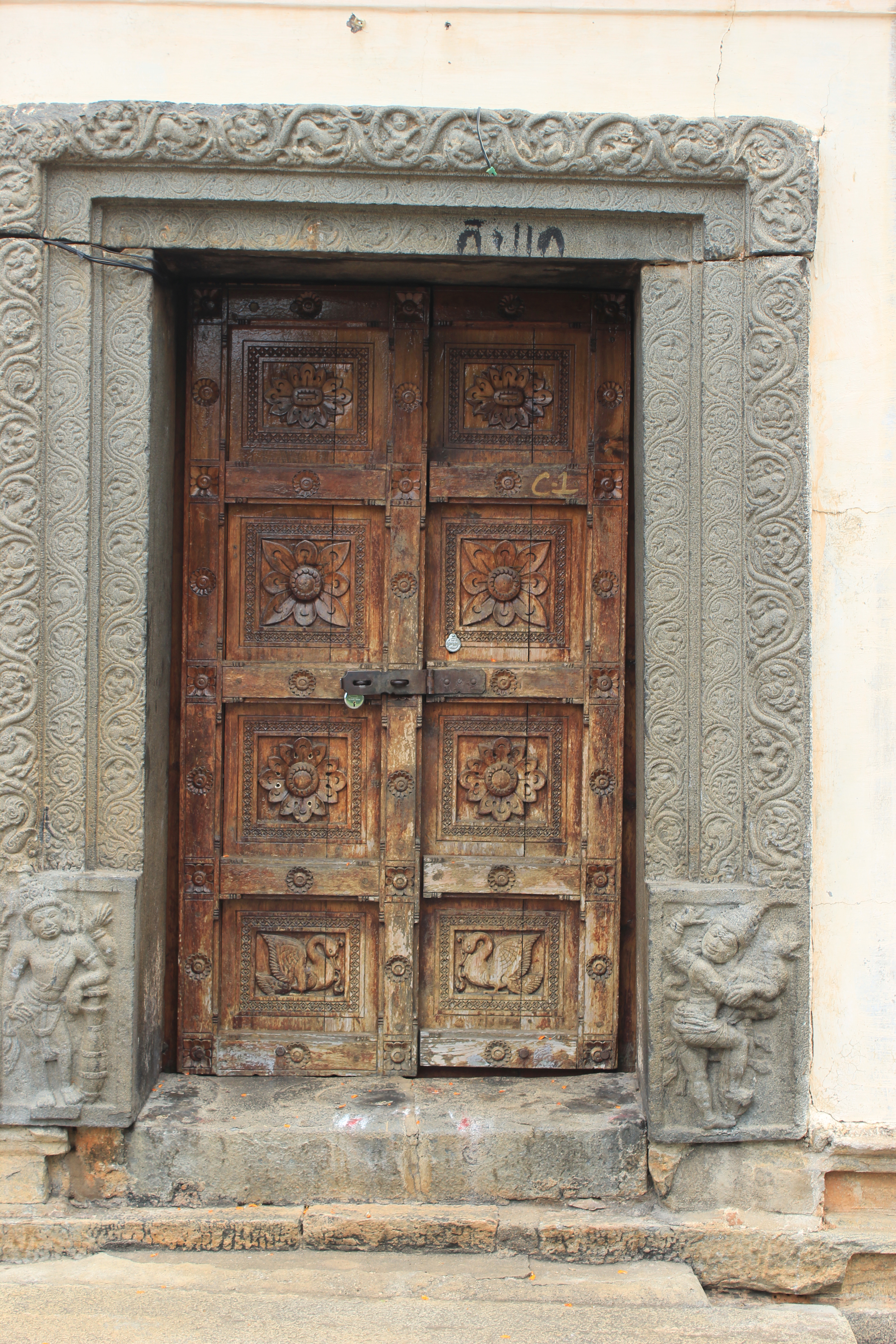
Lintel and doorjamb decoration at entrance to mahamantapa

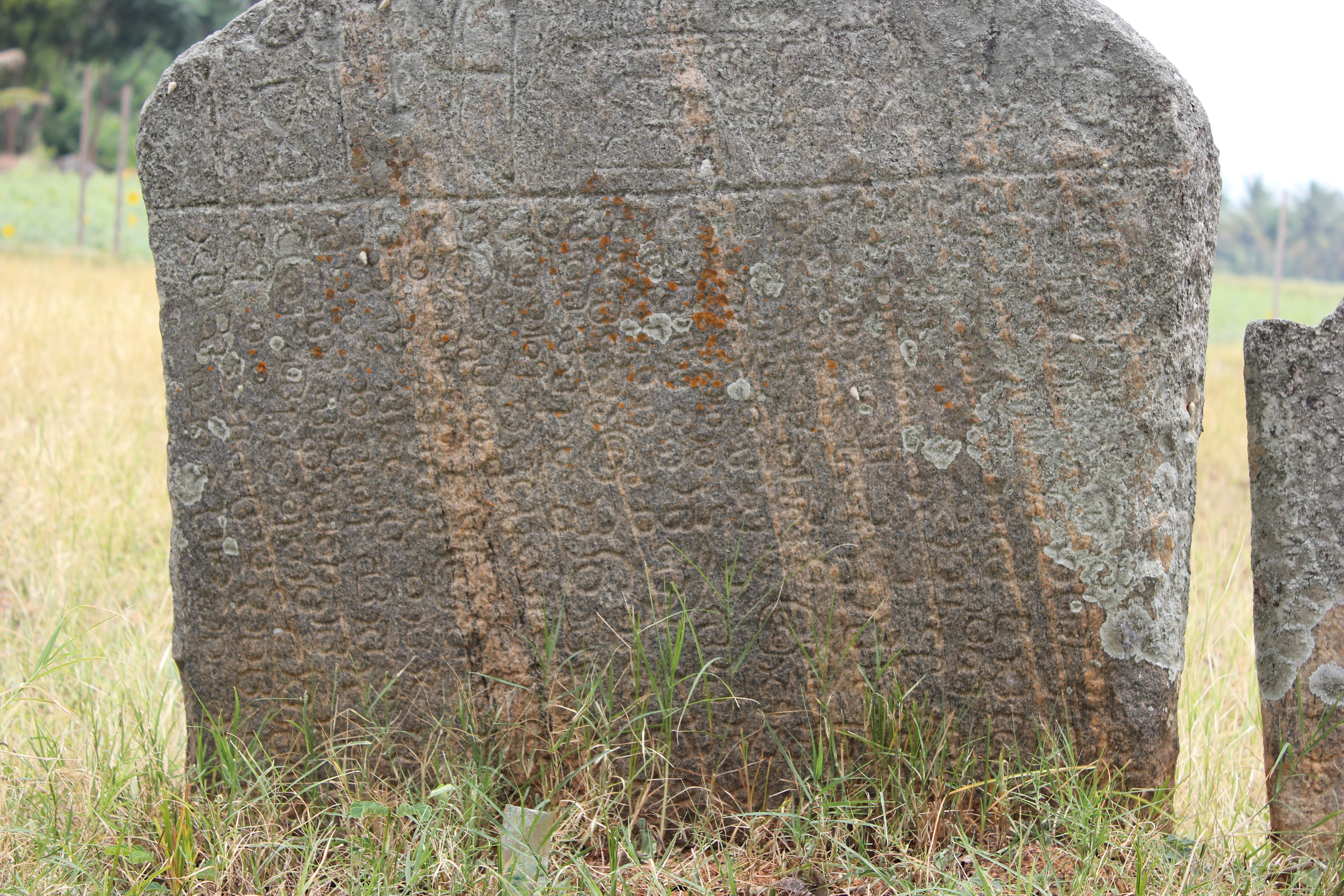
Old Kannada inscription (1291-1343 A.D.) of Hoysala King Veera Ballala III

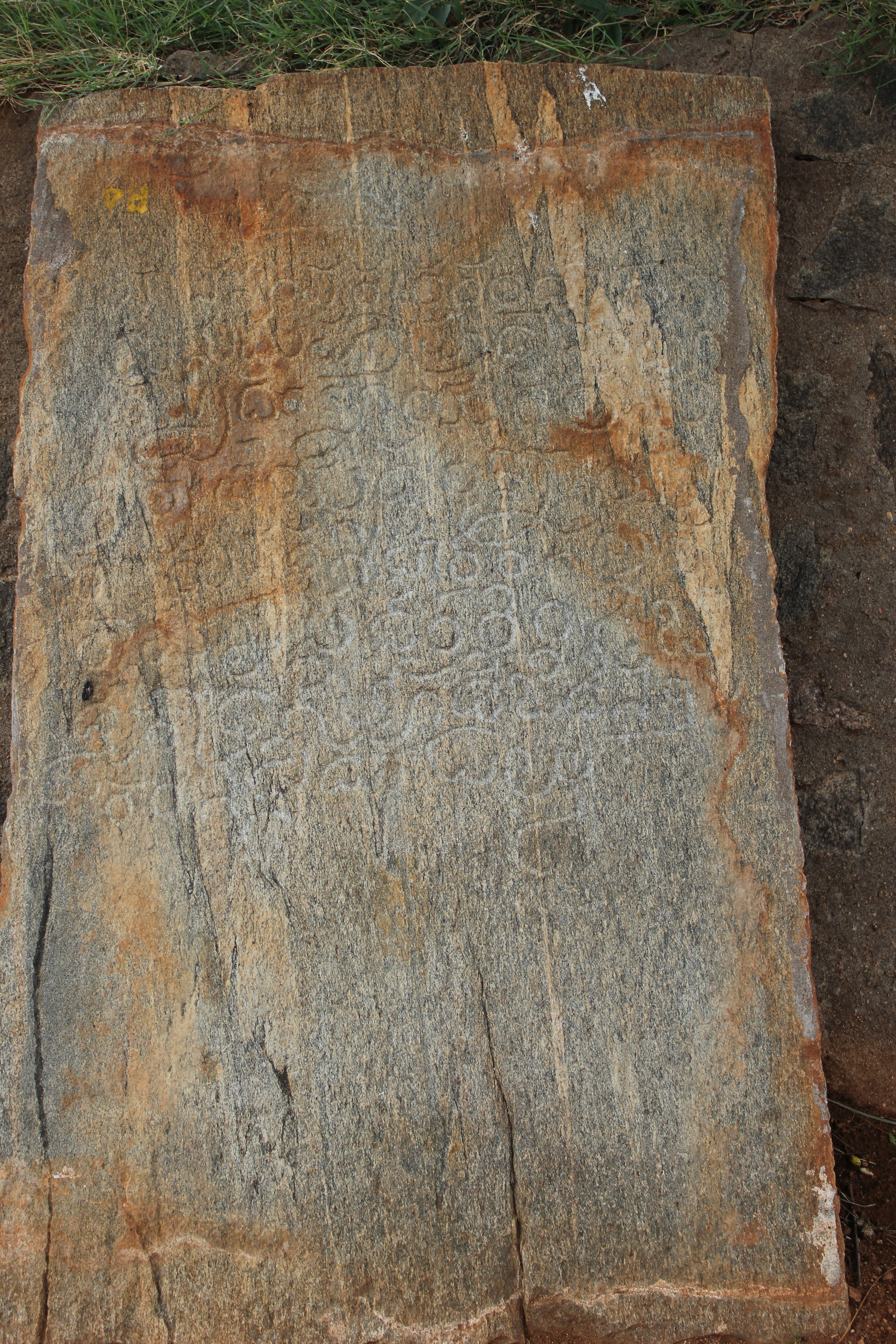
Old Kannada inscription (1291-1343 A.D.) of Hoysala King Veera Ballala III
