= Kalleshvara Temple, Aralaguppe =

Kalleshvara Temple
- Hindu temple
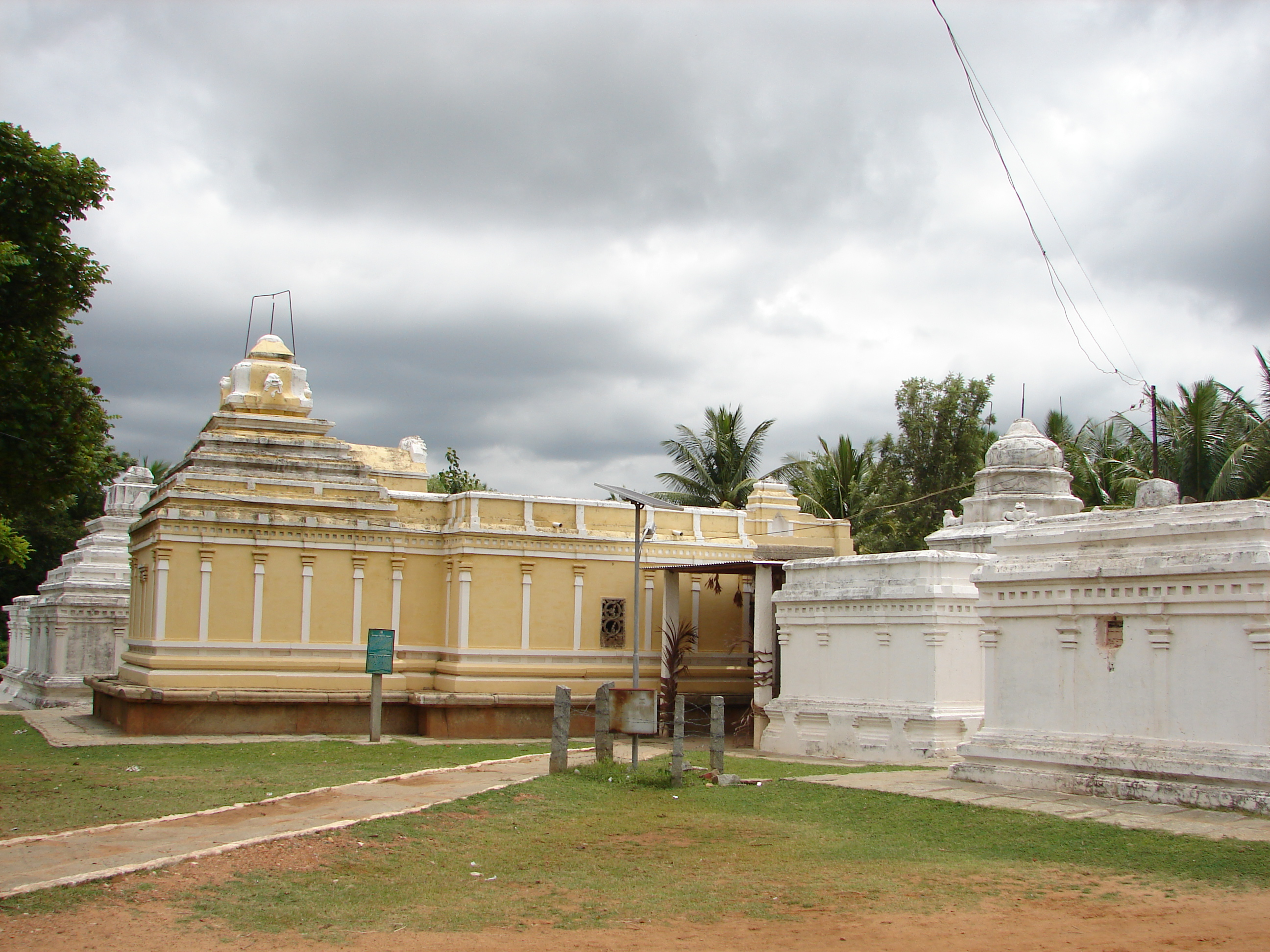
- Kalleshvara temple (900 AD) at Aralaguppe in Tumkur district
- Country: India
- State: Karnataka
- District: Tumkur District

Languages
  - Official: Kannada
- Time zone: UTC+5:30 (IST)

The Kalleshvara temple (also spelt "Kallesvara" or "Kalleshwara") is located in Aralaguppe, a village in the Tiptur taluk of Tumkur district, in the Indian state of Karnataka.

== History ==
According to historian I. K. Sarma, the temple is a fine example of native Western Ganga art of the 9th century, with influences from the Badami Chalukya and Nolamba architectural idioms. It is dedicated to the Hindu god Shiva (also called "Ishvara") and was commissioned by a vassal king of the Nolamba dynasty. Historians I.K. Sarma, B.S. Ali and K.V. Soundara Rajan date the temple to the late 9th century to early 10th-century period. B.S. Ali calls this temple one of the finest examples of Western Ganga art while Aschwin Lippe and Soundara Rajan feel the temple is more consistent with contemporary Nolamba style. The dating of the temple is confirmed by two inscriptions. One inscription in the temple dated 895 C.E. (saka 817) describes the commissioning of the temple by a Nolamba king under his overlord, the Western Ganga King Rachamalla II (r. 870–907 CE). The inscription also records the grant made by King Rachamalla II himself to the construction of this temple (called Kalla-degula in the inscription). The other inscription, a Hero stone in the temple tank (pushkarni), confirms that this region was under the overall control of the Western Ganga Dynasty during this period. Historian Sarma argues that the Western Gangas and Nolambas had close links with regards to "cultural art" and they would have, in their commission, common guilds of architects (sthapatis) and sculptors (silpis). According to Sarma, the three lateral shrines with an enclosure for Nandi the bull (Nandi-sala), the vehicle (vahana) of the god Shiva, was added during the later Hoysala period and this is confirmed by art critic Takeo Kamiya.

== Temple plan and sculptures ==
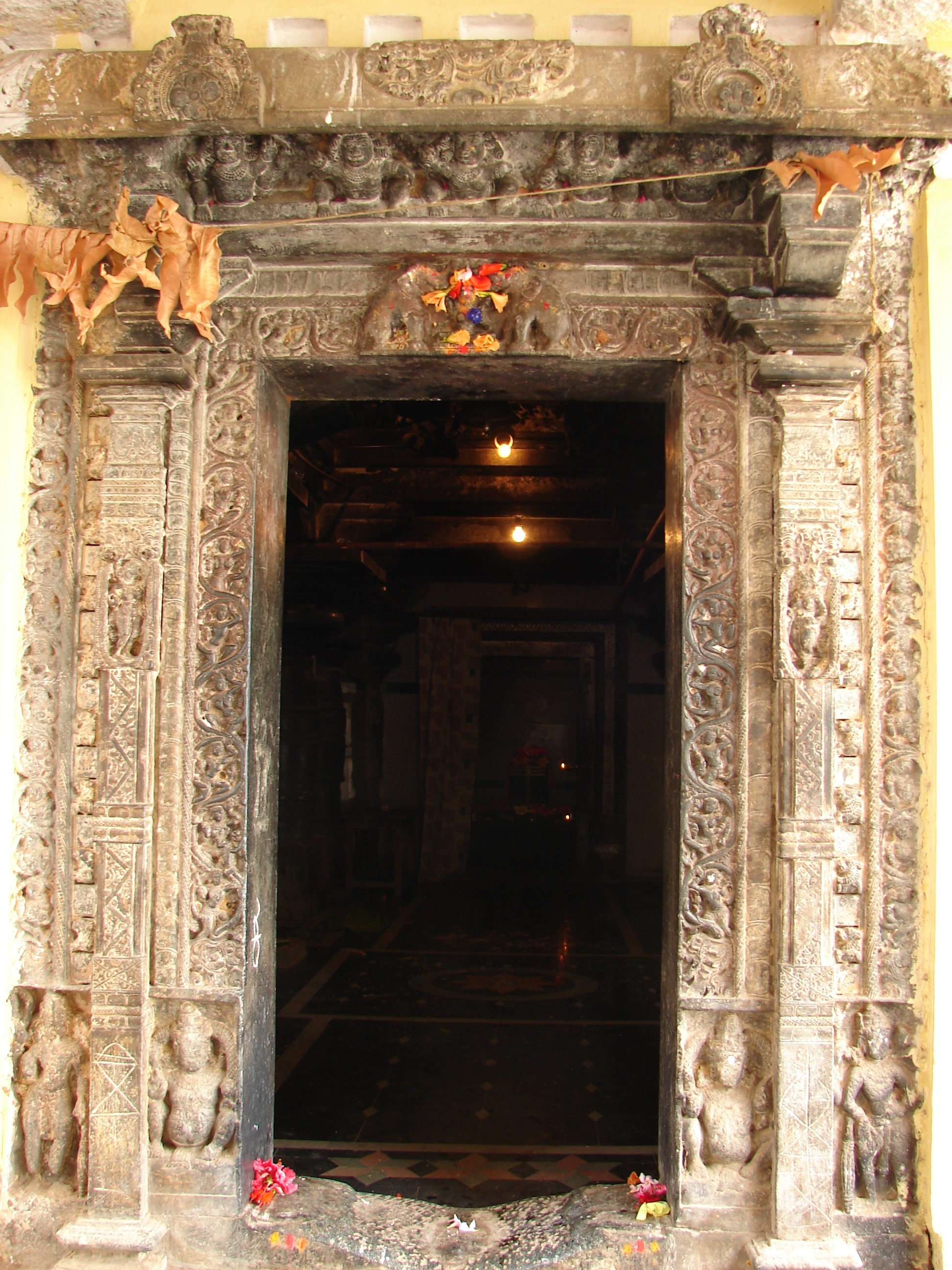
Doorjamb and lintel carvings at Kalleshvara temple

The plan of the sanctum (garbhagriha) is a square pyramidal one, with a plain exterior with simple pilasters, a vestibule (antarala) separating the sanctum from a closed hall (mantapa) with an exceptionally well sculptured section called the mahamantapa or navaranga. The superstructure over the shrine (shikhara) and vestibule (sukanasi) have been renovated at a later period but the base on which the temple stands (Adhiṣṭhāna) is original in construction. The doorjamb (sakha) and the lintel above the main door have exceptional art. The doorjamb exhibits seated door keepers (dwarapalas) at the base, bold scrolls of decorative creepers that run along the sides of the main door and contain Yaksha (benevolent spirits from Hindu mythology) and Yakshis (or Yakshinis, their female counterparts). Above the door, forming the lintel (lalata) is a sculpture of Gajalakshmi (a version of the goddess Lakshmi) with elephants showering her from either side. Sarma feels this sculpture may have inspired the monolithic carving at the main entrance (called akhanda bagilu) on the Vindyagiri hill in the famous Jain heritage town of Shravanabelagola. The ceiling panel grid (ashta-dik-pala grid) of images in the mahamantapa (a section of the mantapa) needs special mention and speaks of the good taste of the Ganga-Nolamba architects. The panel images include a four handed dancing and well ornamented Shiva, and a four tusked elephant (gaja) carrying on its back the god Indra and his consort Sachi.

== Gallery ==
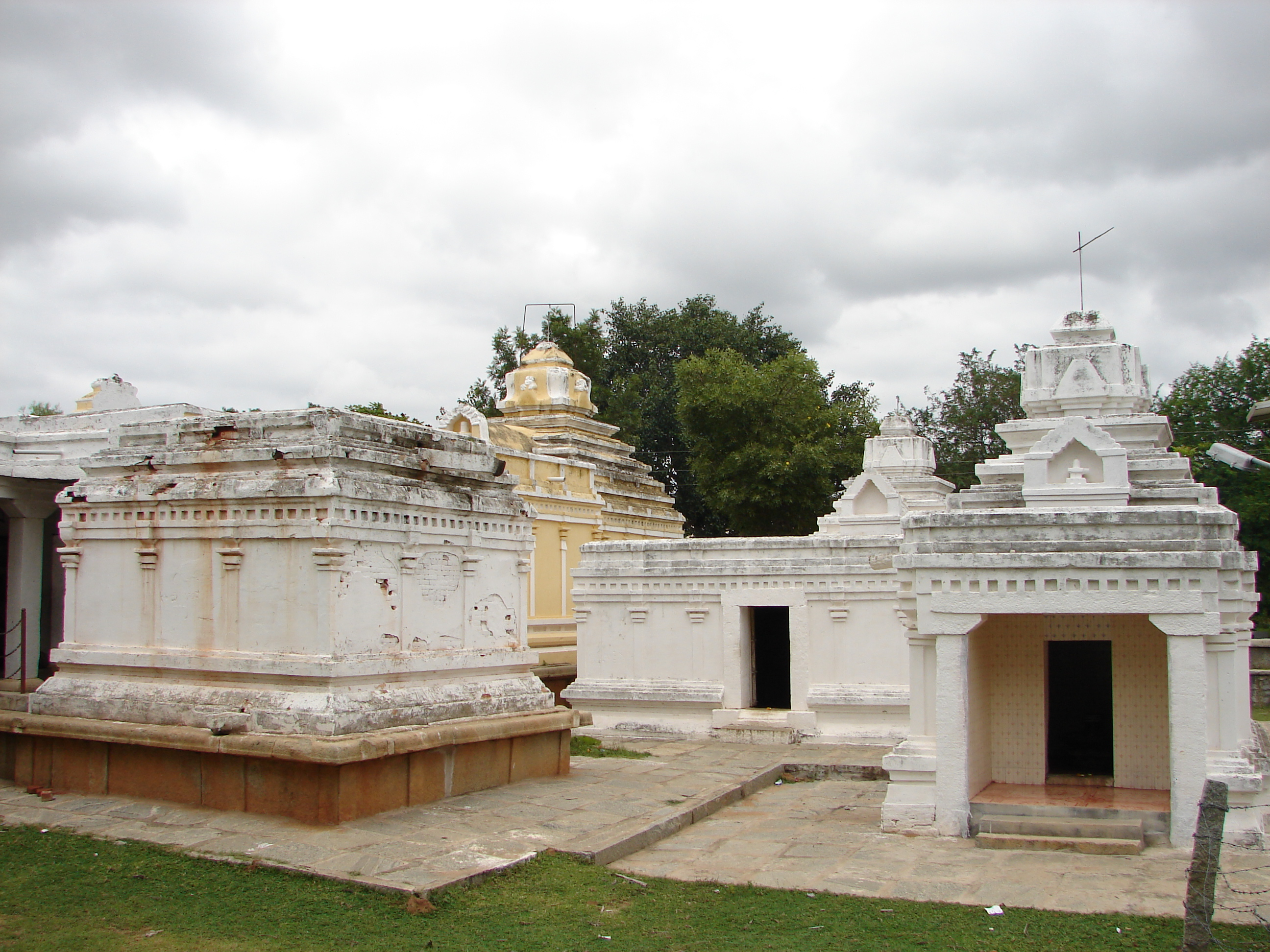
Rear view of Kalleshvara temple complex

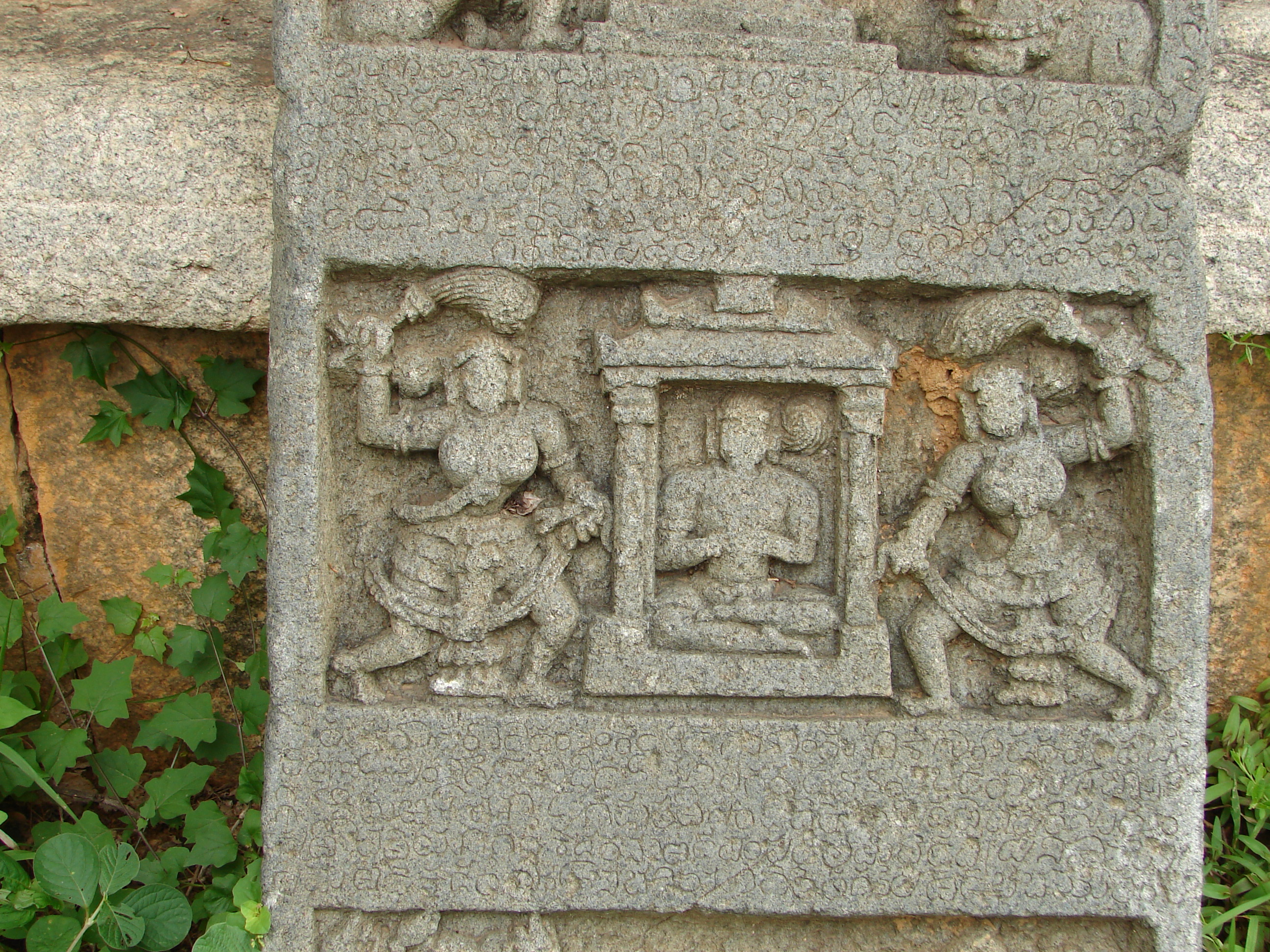
Hero stone with old Kannada inscription (870-906 A.D.) at Kalleshvara temple

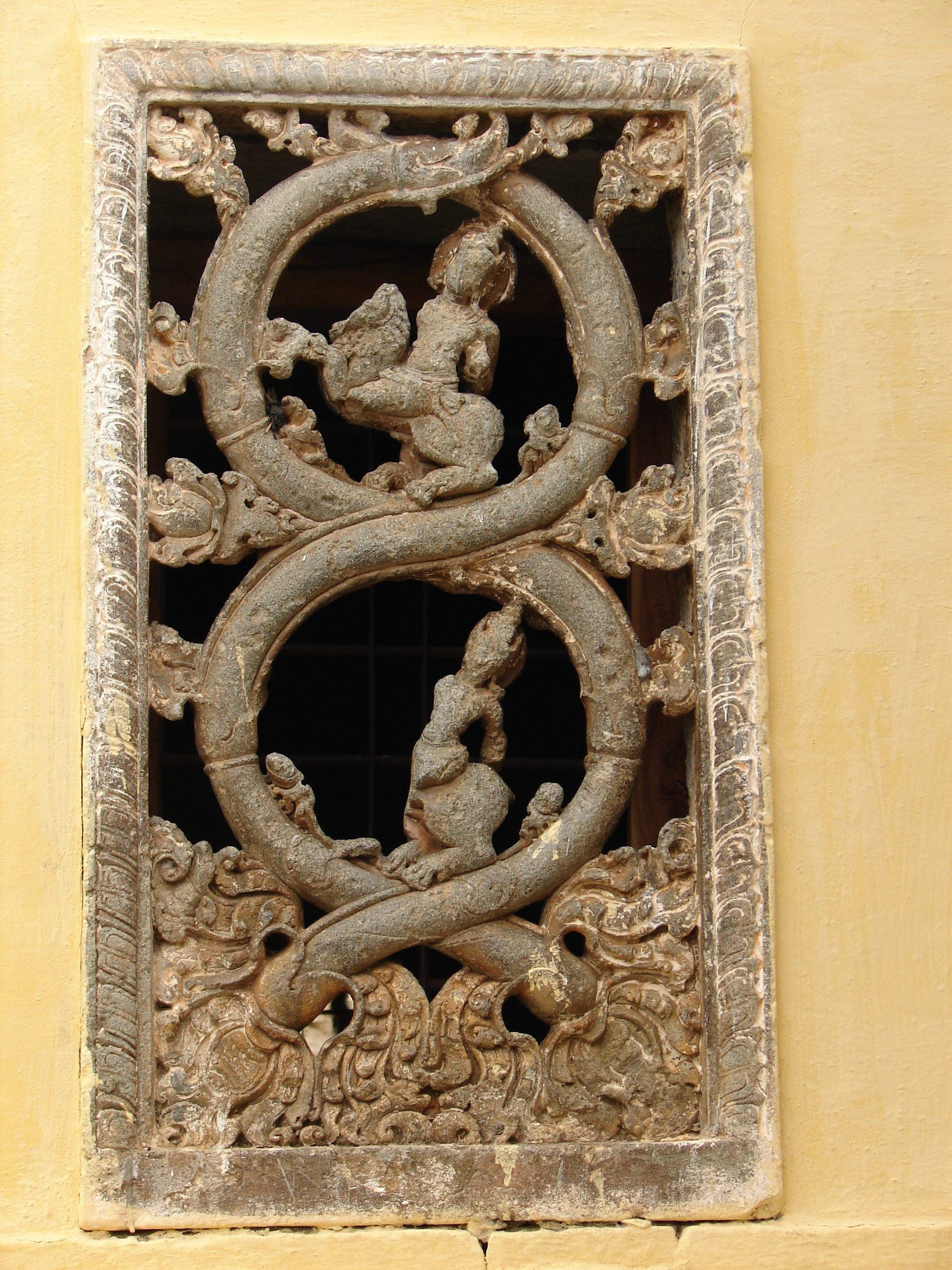
Window art at one of the shrines in the Kalleshvara temple complex
