= Avinita =

Western Ganga King from 469 to 529 CE

- King of the Western Ganga Dynasty
- Reign: 469–529 CE
- Predecessor: Madhava II
- Successor: Durvinita
- Born: Gangavadi region, South India
- Issue: Durvinita
- Dynasty: Western Ganga Dynasty
- Father: Madhava II
- Religion: Jainism

Avinita (reigned c. 469–529 CE) was the sixth king of the Western Ganga dynasty, ruling the region roughly corresponding to modern-day Karnataka. He was a devout Jain and renowned for his courage, administrative acumen, religious tolerance, and literary patronage. Jain Acharya "Vijaykirti" was his teacher and advisor, His reign laid the foundation for the flourishing Ganga state under his son, King Durvinita.

== Early life and accession ==
Avinita was born to Madhava II and a Kadamba princess, who was the sister of the Kadamba king Krishnavarma II. According to tradition, he ascended the throne at a very young age, possibly in infancy, after his father's death. Historical inscriptions laud him as a prodigy of valor, especially skilled in horsemanship, archery, and managing elephants.

He married Jyesthadevi of the Punnata kingdom (present-day Coorg region), through which the Ganga kingdom acquired Punnata territory. He ruled for about sixty years before being succeeded by his son Durvinita.

== Religion ==
Avinita was an ardent follower of Jainism. Epigraphical records document his generous land grants to Jain basadis and temples at Uranur and Perur, often made on the advice of his Jain teacher, Vijayakirti. He is also celebrated in Jain tradition for carrying an image of a Jina across the flooded Kaveri River during his youth, demonstrating his devotion and divine faith.

== Madikeri Tamra Shasana ==
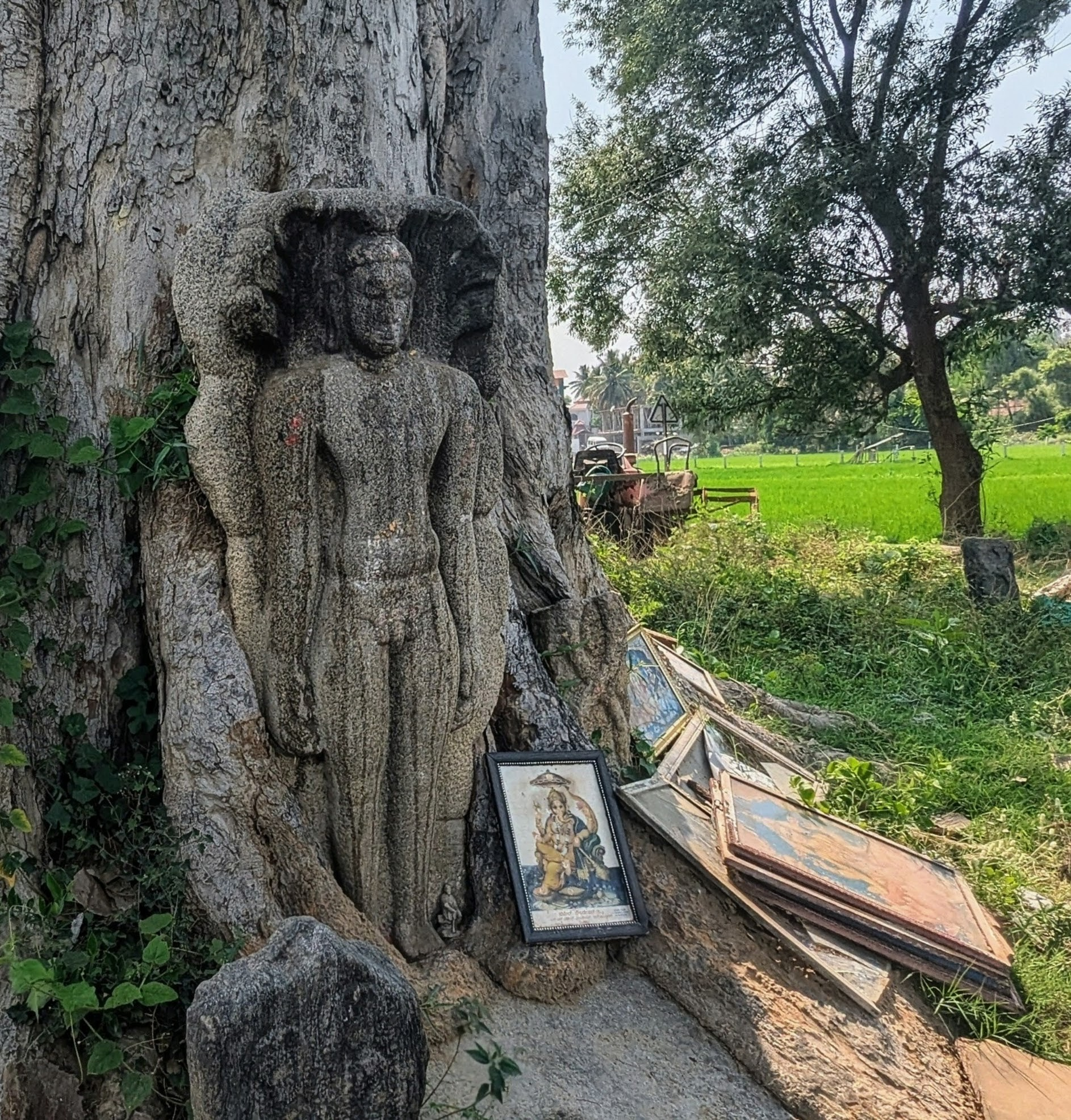
Parshwanatha Statue, Talakadu (Ganga Era Jain Monuments)

The Madikeri copper plate inscription records a significant donation and Jain acharya lineage during the reign of Akalavarsha-Prithvivallabha. It begins by listing the spiritual lineage of Jain monks:

Chandanandi Bhattara, disciple of Gunanandi Bhattara, disciple of Jayanandi Bhattara, who in turn was the disciple of Shilabhadra Bhattara—himself the disciple of Abhayanandi Bhattara, disciple of the illustrious Gunachandra Bhattara of the Desiga-Gana and Kundakunda tradition.

In the Saka year 388 (466 CE), on the fifth day of the bright fortnight (Shukla Paksha) of the month of Magha, on a Monday, under the Swati nakshatra, during the rule of Akalavarsha-Prithvivallabha, the minister of the king, with financial support from the righteous emperor Avinita Mahādhirāja, acquired a charming village named Badaneguppe, situated within the Eddenadu-Eppattu (Eddenadu-70) territory in the Punnadu Six Thousand division. The village was donated to the Shri Vijaya Jina Basadi (Parshvanatha Basadi) at Talavanagara (modern Talakadu), along with twelve kanduga units of land, to support the religious activities of the Jain sangha.

This inscription confirms the presence of a Jain basadi at Talakadu during the reign of King Avinita. Further evidence of Jain heritage in Talakadu emerged during the 2006 ASI-led excavations, where remains of a Jain temple were unearthed but subsequently damaged. Historical accounts and local tradition also state that many Jain temples in Talakadu were destroyed or converted into shaiva temples during the prolonged conflicts between the Gangas and the Cholas.

== Administration and legacy ==
Under Avinita, the Ganga kingdom expanded through political alliances and strengthened state administration. Inscriptions praise his governance style, including reforms in land grants and revenue systems.

== Cultural and literary contributions ==
Avinita ruled in a period marked by early Kannada literary growth. Though no texts are attributed directly to him, Buddhist and Jain scholars, including Udaya-vikrama, composed works at his court. His son Durvinita later became a recognized literary patron and author in Sanskrit and Kannada.
