= Shivamara I =

- King of the Western Ganga Dynasty
- Reign: c. 670 – 725 CE
- Predecessor: Durvinita
- Successor: Sripurusha
- Dynasty: Ganga dynasty
- Religion: Jainism

Shivamara I (r. c. 670–725 CE) was an early king of the Western Ganga dynasty, credited with substantially boosting Jain influence through temple-building and basadi patronage. His rule helped establish Shravanabelagola and Talakadu as key centers of Jain worship in Karnataka.

== Reign and Political Context ==
Shivamara I succeeded the well-known king Durvinita and ruled under the suzerainty of the Badami Chalukyas. Inscriptions from Dharmapuri and Krishnagiri confirm his control over regions formerly known as Kongu and Gangavadi.

== Religion and Patronage ==
Jainism gained broader popularity during his reign; he is known to have constructed numerous Jain basadis, especially at Shravanabelagola. This period marks the beginning of sustained Jain royal patronage in the region, a legacy later exemplified by Butuga II and minister Chavundaraya.

== Legacy ==
Shivamara I helped solidify the dynasty's Jain identity. While his nephew and descendants like Sripurusha would face Rashtrakuta challenges, Shivamara's era laid the foundation for the monastic and temple networks that endured through his successors.

== Bibliography ==
• Settar, S. (1989). Jaina Art and Architecture, Vol. 2. Delhi: Agam Kala Prakashan. ISBN 9788170770214.

• “Religion in Western Ganga kingdom.” Wikipedia, accessed July 2025.

• Jain Quantum (2008). “History of Early Ganga Monarchy and Jainism,” pp. 68–69.
