= Durvinita =

Western Ganga King from 529 to 579 CE

7th Western Ganga King
- Reign: c. 529 – c. 579 CE
- Predecessor: Avinita
- Successor: Mushkara
- Dynasty: Western Ganga
- Father: Avinita
- Religion: Jainism

Durvinita (r. 529 – 579 CE) is seen as the most successful ruler of the Western Ganga dynasty. He is remembered for his military prowess, literary achievements, and strong patronage of Jainism. He was a son of the preceding king Avinita.

Durvinita's accession to the throne was disputed by his brother, who had gained the support of the Pallavas and Kadambas. There are Nallala and Kadagattur inscriptions that refer to this dispute. However, Durvinita managed to grab the throne by virtue of his valour.

== Life ==
During Durvinita's rule, the Pallava and Ganga kingdoms fought several battles. Durvinita defeated the Pallavas in the battle of Anderi. Though the Pallavas sought the assistance of the Kadambas to the north to tame Durvinita, the Gummareddipura inscription hails that Durvinita overcame his enemies at Alattur, Porulare and Pernagra. It is possible that these victories enabled him to extend his power over Kongudesa and Tondaimandalam regions of Tamil country.

Durvinita was a clever king. In order to keep the Pallavas at bay, he gave his daughter to Chalukya Vijayaditya or from the Nagara record to Pulakesi II, though the latter is unlikely owing to the difference in their eras. The Chalukyas were an emerging power at this time. When the Pallavas attacked the Chalukyas, he fought on the Chalukya side and cemented a long lasting friendship with the Chalukyas that lasted through the rule of both the Badami Chalukyas, Rashtrakutas and Kalyani Chalukyas, covering a period of over 600 years. The Gummareddipura and the Uttanur plates describe Durvinita as the Lord of Punnata.

== Religion ==
Durvinita was a devout follower of Jainism. Inscriptions suggest he patronized Jain monks of the Desiga-gana and Kundakunda traditions. Several Jain temples were established or supported under his reign. His religious generosity is attested in records like the Madikeri copper plate inscription, where a Jain lineage tracing back to Gunachandra Bhattara is honored.

Durvinita was a disciple of the Jain Pujyapada, and his court had several Jain scholars. Such tolerance was common among later Ganga kings, who were Jains from the beginning

A 977 CE inscription states that Durvinita commissioned the construction of a Jain temple (basadi); the inscription records a grant by Indrakirti Munindra to this temple.

== Works ==
Durvinita was a scholar and patronized several learned men, including his tutor Pujyapada. According to Avanti-sundari-katha-sara, a work attributed to Dandin, Durvinita's court hosted the Sanskrit poet Bharavi for some time. The Nallala grant inscription, issued during the 40th year of his reign, states that he was an expert at composing poetry, stories, dramas, and commentaries.

=== Debates ===
During his reign, Durvinita is said to have engaged in public philosophical debates, where he reportedly defeated Buddhist scholars, reaffirming Jain philosophical dominance in the region. According to epigraphic sources, Durvinita’s court upheld Jain doctrines and he is the disciple of Pujyapada, who is believed to have led these debates. His victories in religious disputations further strengthened the status of Jainism in the Western Ganga kingdom and contributed to the gradual decline of Buddhist influence in parts of Karnataka.

=== Works in Kannada ===
Durvinita was well-versed in Sanskrit and Kannada languages. Amoghavarsha's Kannada-language text Kavirajamarga hails Durvinita as one of the early writers in Kannada prose, though no Kannada works by him survive. According to multiple Ganga grant inscriptions, such as the Gummareddipura inscription, Durvinita wrote a Kannada-language commentary on Canto 15 of Bharavi's Kirātārjunīya.

=== Works in Sanskrit ===
The Gummareddipura inscription and other Ganga inscriptions also suggest that he composed a Sanskrit version of Brihatkatha (Vadda-katha). These inscriptions also describe him as Shabdavatara-kara, suggesting that he composed the Shabdavatara (a work on grammar). However, Shabdavatara is a work of his tutor Pujyapada. He also translated Gunadhya's Brihatkatha into Sanskrit.

Preceded by Avinita	Western Ganga dynasty 529–579	Succeeded by Mushkara
