= Western Ganga dynasty =

Ruling dynasty of ancient Karnataka in India

- 350–1004
- Core Western Ganga Territory
- Status: Kingdom (Subordinate to Pallava until 350)
- Capital: Kolar; Talakad; Channapatna; Manne
- Common languages: Kannada; Sanskrit
- Religion: Jainism; Hinduism
- Government: Monarchy
- Maharaja
  - 350–370: Dadiga Madhava
  - 986–999: Rachamalla V
- History
  - Earliest Ganga records: 350
  - Established: 350
  - Disestablished: 1004
- Today part of: India

Western Ganga was an important ruling dynasty of ancient Karnataka in India which lasted from about 350 to 1004 CE. They are known as "Western Gangas" to distinguish them from the Eastern Gangas who in later centuries ruled over Kalinga (modern Odisha and northern Andhra Pradesh). The general belief is that the Western Gangas began their rule during a time when multiple native clans asserted their freedom due to the weakening of the Pallava empire in South India, a geo-political event sometimes attributed to the southern conquests of Samudra Gupta. The Western Ganga sovereignty lasted from about 350 to 550 CE, initially ruling from Kolar and later moving their capital to Talakadu on the banks of the Kaveri River in modern Mysore district.

After the rise of the imperial Chalukyas of Badami, the Gangas accepted Chalukya overlordship and fought for the cause of their overlords against the Pallavas of Kanchi. The Chalukyas were replaced by the Rashtrakutas of Manyakheta in 753 CE as the dominant power in the Deccan. After a century of struggle for autonomy, the Western Gangas finally accepted Rashtrakuta overlordship and successfully fought alongside them against their foes, the Chola Dynasty of Tanjavur. In the late 10th century, north of Tungabhadra river, the Rashtrakutas were replaced by the emerging Western Chalukya Empire and the Chola Dynasty saw renewed power south of the Kaveri river. The defeat of the Western Gangas by Cholas around 1000 resulted in the end of the Ganga influence over the region.

The Western Gangas contribution to the culture and literature of the modern south Karnataka region is considered important. The Western Ganga kings showed benevolent tolerance to all faiths but are most famous for their patronage toward Jainism resulting in the construction of monuments in places such as Shravanabelagola and Kambadahalli. The kings of this dynasty encouraged the fine arts due to which literature in Kannada and Sanskrit flourished. Chavundaraya's writing, Chavundaraya Purana of 978 CE, is an important work in Kannada prose. Many classics were written on various subjects ranging from religion to elephant management.

== History ==
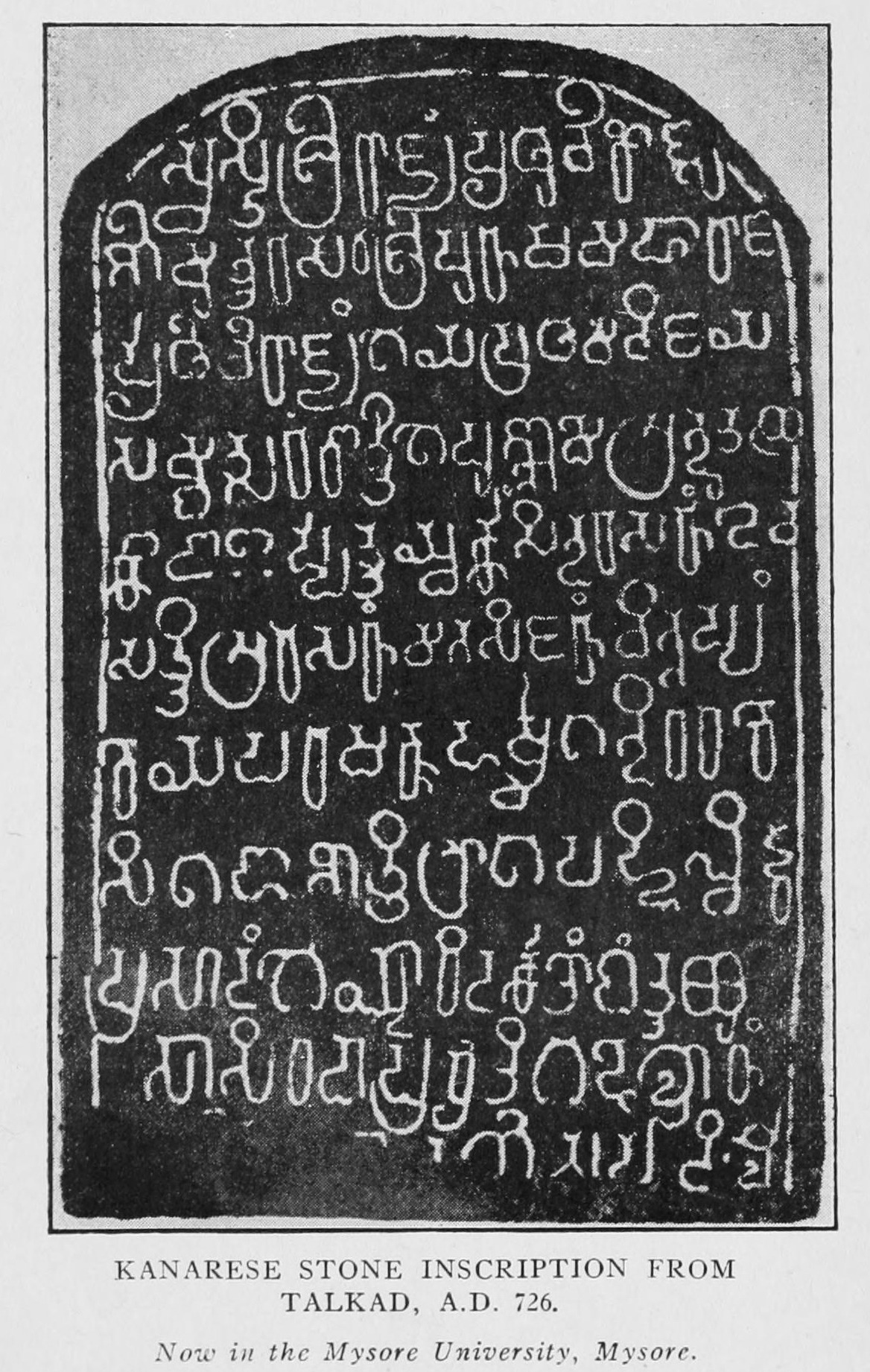
Old Kannada inscription of c. 726 CE, discovered in Talakad, from the rule of King Shivamara I or Sripurusha

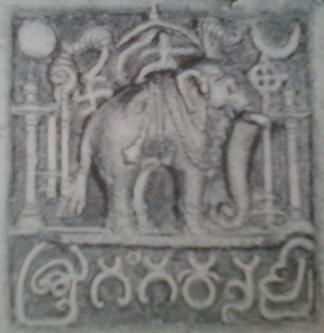
Ganga Dynasty emblem on a 10th-century copper plate

Multiple theories have been proposed regarding the ancestry of the founders of the Western Ganga dynasty (prior to the 4th century). Some mythical accounts point to a northern origin, while theories based on epigraphy suggest a southern origin. According to some records, the Western Gangas were of the Kanvayana gotra and traced their lineage to the Ikshvakus of the solar dynasty. Historians who propose the southern origin have further debated whether the early petty chieftains of the clan (prior to their rise to power) were natives of the southern districts of modern Karnataka, the Kongu Nadu region in modern Tamil Nadu or of the southern districts of modern Andhra Pradesh. These regions encompass an area of the southern Deccan where the three modern states merge geographically. It is theorised that the Gangas may have taken advantage of the confusion caused by the invasion of southern India by the northern king Samudra Gupta prior to 350, and carved out a kingdom for themselves. The area they controlled was called Gangavadi and included regions of the modern districts of Mysore, Hassan, Mandya, Ramanagara, Chamarajanagar, Tumkur, Kolar, and Bangalore in Karnataka state. At times, they also controlled some areas in modern Tamil Nadu (Kongu region starting from the 6th century rule of King Avinita) and Andhra Pradesh (Ananthpur region starting from the middle of the 5th century). The founding king of the dynasty was Konganivarma Madhava who made Kolar his capital around 350 and ruled for about twenty years.

By the time of Harivarma in 390, the Gangas had consolidated their kingdom with Talakad as their capital. Their move from the early capital Kolar may have been a strategic one with the intention of containing the growing Kadamba power. By 430 they had consolidated their eastern territories comprising modern Bangalore, Kolar and Tumkur districts and by 470 they had gained control over Kongu region in modern Tamil Nadu, Sendraka (modern Chikkamagaluru and Belur), Punnata and Pannada regions (comprising modern Heggadadevanakote and Nanjangud) in modern Karnataka. In 529, King Durvinita ascended the throne after waging a war with his younger brother who was favoured by his father, King Avinita. Some accounts suggest that in this power struggle, the Pallavas of Kanchi supported Avinita's choice of heir and the Badami Chalukya King Vijayaditya supported his father-in-law, Durvinita. From the inscriptions it is known that these battles were fought in Tondaimandalam and Kongu regions (northern Tamil Nadu) prompting historians to suggest that Durvinita fought the Pallavas successfully. Considered the most successful of the Ganga kings, Durvinita was well versed in arts such as music, dance, ayurveda and taming wild elephants. Some inscriptions sing paeans to him by comparing him to Yudhishthira and Manu – figures from Hindu mythology known for their wisdom and fairness.

Politically, the Gangas were feudatories and close allies who also shared matrimonial relations with the Chalukyas. This is attested by inscriptions which describe their joint campaigns against their arch enemy, the Pallavas of Kanchi. From the year 725 onwards, the Gangavadi territories came to be called as the "Gangavadi-96000" (Shannavati Sahasra Vishaya) comprising the eastern and western provinces of modern south Karnataka. King Sripurusha fought the Pallava King Nandivarman Pallavamalla successfully, bringing Penkulikottai in north Arcot under his control temporarily for which he earned the title Permanadi. A contest with the Pandyas of Madurai over control of Kongu region ended in a Ganga defeat, but a matrimony between a Ganga princess and Rajasimha Pandya's son brought peace helping the Gangas retain control over the contested region.

In 753, when the Rashtrakutas replaced the Badami Chalukyas as the dominant force in the Deccan, the Gangas offered stiff resistance for about a century. King Shivamara II is mostly known for his wars with the Rashtrakuta Dhruva Dharavarsha, his subsequent defeat and imprisonment, his release from prison and eventually his death on the battle field. The Ganga resistance continued through the reign of Rashtrakuta Govinda III and by 819, a Ganga resurgence gained them partial control over Gangavadi under King Rachamalla. Seeing the futility of waging war with the Western Ganga, Rashtrakuta Amoghavarsha I gave his daughter Chandrabbalabbe in marriage to Ganga prince Butuga I, son of King Ereganga Neetimarga. The Gangas thereafter became staunch allies of the Rashtrakutas, a position they maintained till the end of the Rashtrakuta dynasty of Manyakheta.

After an uneventful period, Butuga II ascended the throne in 938 with the help of Rashtrakuta Amoghavarsha III (whose daughter he married). He helped the Rashtrakutas win decisive victories in Tamilakam in the battle of Takkolam against the Chola Dynasty. With this victory, the Rashtrakutas took control of modern northern Tamil Nadu. In return for their valour, the Gangas were awarded extensive territories in the Tungabhadra river valley. King Marasimha II who came to power in 963 aided the Rashtrakutas in victories against the Gurjara Pratihara King Lalla and the Paramara kings of Malwa in Central India. Chavundaraya, a minister in the Western Ganga court was a valiant commander, able administrator and an accomplished poet in Kannada and Sanskrit. He served King Marasimha II and his successors ably and helped King Rachamalla IV suppress a civil war in 975. Towards the end of the 10th century, the Rashtrakutas had been supplanted by the Western Chalukya Empire in Manyakheta. In the south, the Chola Dynasty who were seeing a resurgence of power under Rajaraja Chola I conquered Gangavadi around the year 1000, bringing the Western Ganga dynasty to an end. Thereafter, large areas of south Karnataka region came under Chola control for about a century.

== Administration ==
The Western Ganga administration was influenced by principles stated in the ancient text arthashastra. The praje gavundas mentioned in the Ganga records held responsibilities similar to those of the village elders (gramavriddhas) mentioned by Kautilya. Succession to the throne was hereditary but there were instances when this was overlooked. The kingdom was divided into Rashtra (district) and further into Visaya (consisting of possibly 1000 villages) and Desa. From the 8th century, the Sanskrit term Visaya was replaced by the Kannada term Nadu. Examples of this change are Sindanadu-8000 and Punnadu-6000, with scholars differing about the significance of the numerical suffix. They opine that it was either the revenue yield of the division computed in cash terms or the number of fighting men in that division or the number of revenue paying hamlets in that division or the number of villages included in that territory.

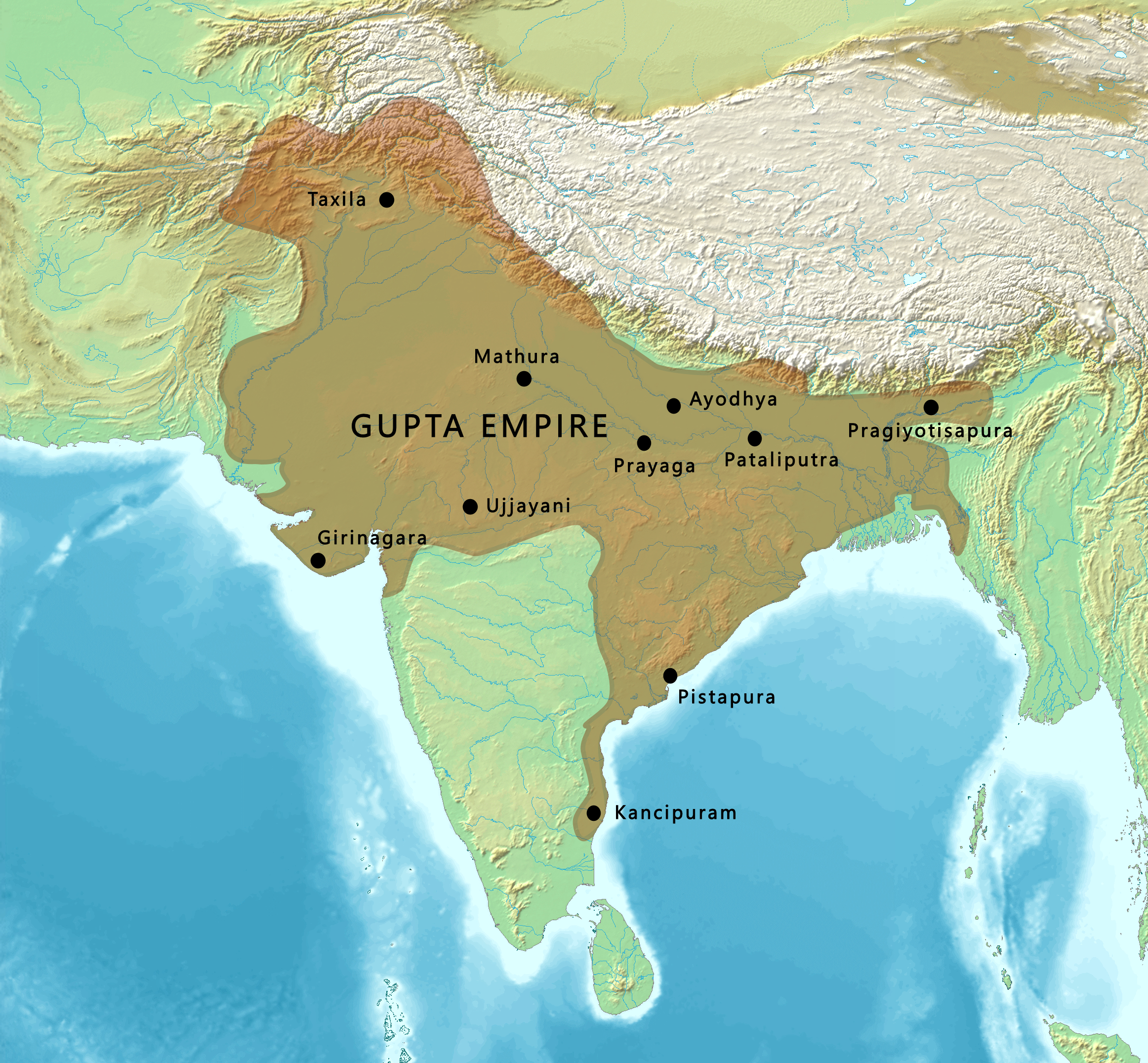
Location of the Western Gangas and neighbouring polities circa 400-450 CE.

Inscriptions have revealed several important administrative designations such as prime minister (sarvadhikari), treasurer (shribhandari), foreign minister (sandhivirgrahi) and chief minister (mahapradhana). All of these positions came with an additional title of commander (dandanayaka). Other designations were royal steward (manevergade), master of robes (mahapasayita), commander of elephant corps (gajasahani), commander of cavalry (thuragasahani) etc. In the royal house, Niyogis oversaw palace administration, royal clothing and jewellery etc. and the Padiyara were responsible for court ceremonies including door keeping and protocol.

Officials at the local level were the pergade, nadabova, nalagamiga, prabhu and gavunda. The pergades were superintendents from all social classes such as artisans, gold smiths, black smiths etc. The pergades dealing with the royal household were called manepergade (house superintendent) and those who collected tolls were called Sunka vergades. The nadabovas were accountants and tax collectors at the Nadu level and sometimes functioned as scribes. The nalagamigas were officers who organized and maintained defence at the Nadu level. The prabhu constituted a group of elite people drawn together to witness land grants and demarcation of land boundaries. The gavundas who appear most often in inscriptions were the backbone of medieval polity of the southern Karnataka region. They were landlords and local elite whom the state utilized their services to collect taxes, maintain records of landownership, bear witness to grants and transactions and even raise militia when required.

Inscriptions that specify land grants, rights and ownership were descriptive of the boundaries of demarcation using natural features such as rivers, streams, water channels, hillocks, large boulders, layout of the village, location of forts (kote) if any in the proximity, irrigation canals, temples, tanks and even shrubs and large trees. Also included was the type of soil, the crops meant to be grown and tanks or wells to be excavated for irrigation. Inscriptions mention wet land, cultivable land, forest and waste land. There are numerous references to hamlets (palli) belonging to the hunter communities who resided in them (bedapalli). From the 6th century onwards, the inscriptions refer to feudal lords by the title arasa. The arasas were either brahmins or from tribal background who controlled hereditary territories paying periodic tribute to the king. The velavali who were loyal bodyguards of the royalty were fierce warriors under oath (vele). They moved with the royal family and were expected to fight for the master and be willing to lay down their lives in the process. If the king died, the velavali were required to self immolate on the funeral pyre of the master.

== Economy ==
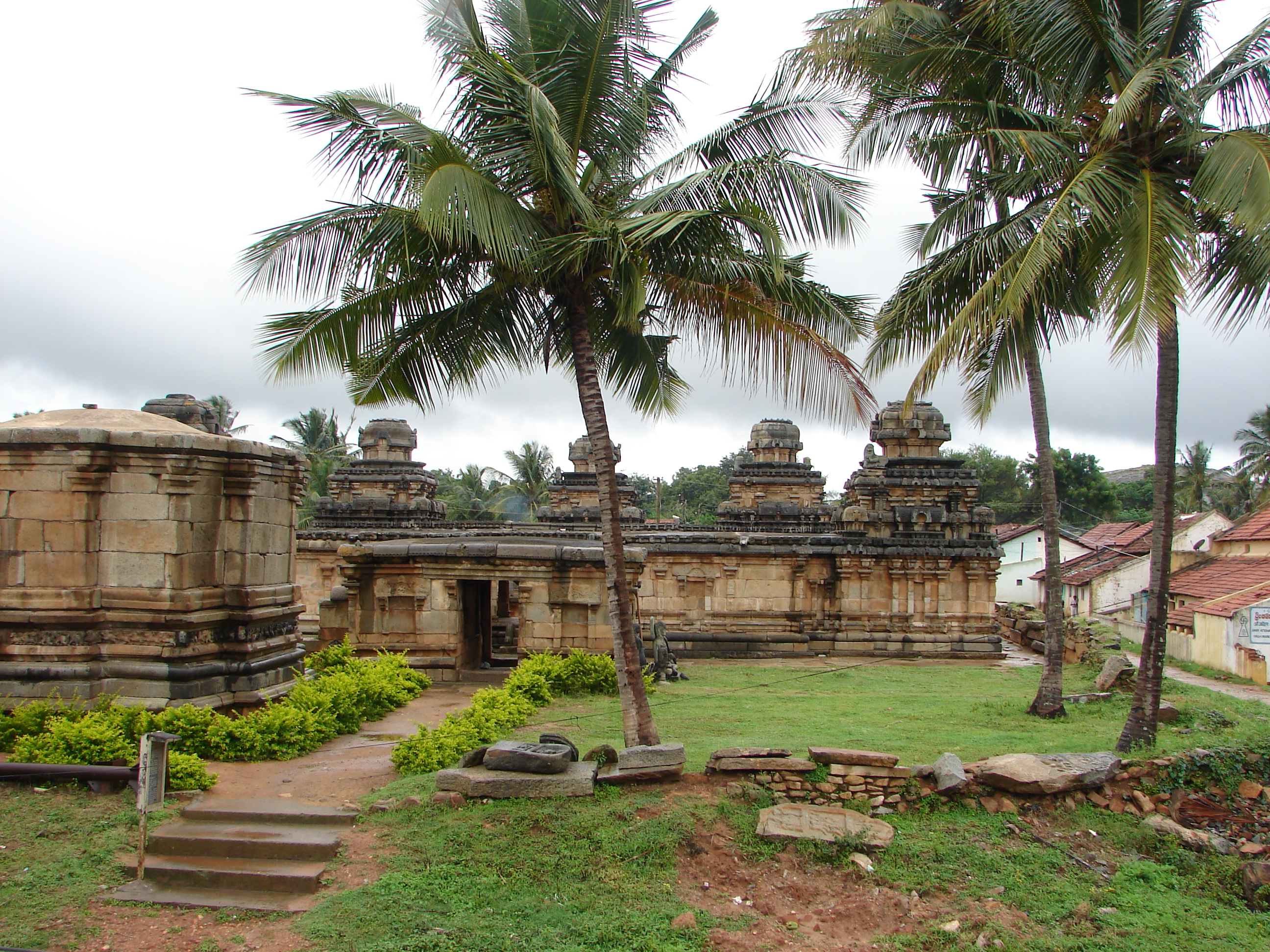
The Panchakuta Basadi, Kambadahalli was an important center of Jainism during the Ganga period.

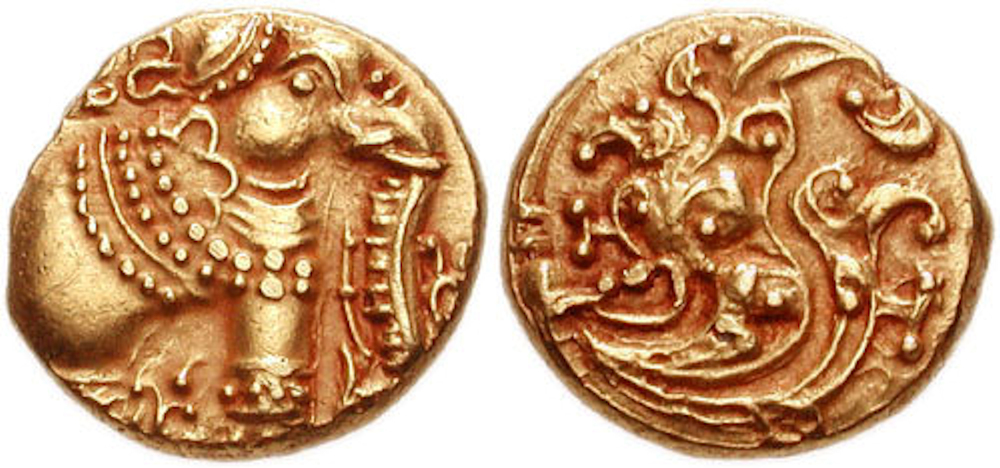
Gangas of Talakad (Western Gangas). Circa 1080-1138 AD

The Gangavadi region consisted of the malnad region, the plains (Bayaluseemae) and the semi-malnad with lower elevation and rolling hills. The main crops of the malnad region were paddy, betel leaves, cardamom and pepper and the semi-malnad region with its lower altitude produced rice, millets such as ragi and corn, pulses, oilseeds and it was also the base for cattle farming. The plains to the east were the flat lands fed by Kaveri, Tungabhadra and Vedavati rivers where cultivations of sugarcane, paddy, coconut, areca nut (adeka totta), betel leaves, plantain and flowers (vara vana) were common. Sources of irrigation were excavated tanks, wells, natural ponds and water bodies in the catchment area of dams (Katta). Inscriptions attesting to irrigation of previously uncultivated lands seem to indicate an expanding agrarian community.

Soil types mentioned in records are black soil (Karimaniya) in the Sinda-8000 territory and to red soil (Kebbayya mannu) Cultivated land was of three types; wet land, dry land and to a lesser extent garden land with paddy being the dominant crop of the region. Wet lands were called kalani, galde, nir mannu or nir panya and was specifically used to denote paddy land requiring standing water. The fact that pastoral economies were spread throughout Gangavadi region comes from references to cowherds in many inscriptions. The terms gosahasra (a thousand cows), gasara (owner of cows), gosasi (donor of cows), goyiti (cowherdess), gosasa (protector of cows) attest to this. Inscriptions indicate ownership of cows may have been as important as cultivable land and that there may have existed a social hierarchy based on this. Inscriptions mention cattle raids attesting to the importance of the pastoral economy, destructive raids, assaults on women (pendir-udeyulcal), abduction of women by bedas (hunter tribes); all of which indicate the existing militarism of the age.

Lands that were exempt from taxes were called manya and sometimes consisted of several villages. They were granted by local chieftains without any reference to the overlord, indicating a de-centralised economy. These lands, often given to heroes who perished in the line of duty were called bilavritti or kalnad. When such a grant was made for the maintenance of temples at the time of consecration, it was called Talavritti. Some types of taxes on income were kara or anthakara (internal taxes), utkota (gifts due to the king), hiranya (cash payments) and sulika (tolls and duties on imported items). Taxes were collected from those who held the right to cultivate land; even if the land was not actually cultivated.

Siddhaya was a local tax levied on agriculture and pottondi was a tax levied on merchandise by the local feudal ruler. Based on context, pottondi also meant 1/10, aydalavi meant 1/5 and elalavi meant 1/7. Mannadare literally meant land tax and was levied together with shepherds tax (Kurimbadere) payable to the chief of shepherds. Bhaga meant a portion or share of the produce from land or the land area itself. Minor taxes such as Kirudere (due to the landlords) and samathadere (raised by the army officers or samantha) are mentioned. In addition to taxes for maintenance of the local officer's retinue, villages were obligated to feed armies on the march to and from battles. Bittuvatta or niravari taxes comprised usually of a percentage of the produce and was collected for constructing irrigation tanks.

== Culture ==
=== Religion ===
The Western Gangas gave patronage to all the major religions of the time; Jainism and the Hindu sects of Shaivism, Vedic Brahmanism and Vaishnavism. However scholars have argued that not all Gangas kings may have given equal priority to all the faiths. Some historians believe that the Gangas were ardent Jains. However, inscriptions contradict this by providing references to kalamukhas (staunch Shaiva ascetics), pasupatas and lokayatas (followers of Pasupatha doctrine) who flourished in Gangavadi, indicating that Shaivism was also popular. King Madhava and Harivarma were devoted to cows and brahmins, King Vishnugopa was a devout Vaishnava, Madhava III's and Avinita's inscriptions describe lavish endowments to Jain orders and temples and King Durvinita performed Vedic sacrifices prompting historians to claim he was a Hindu.

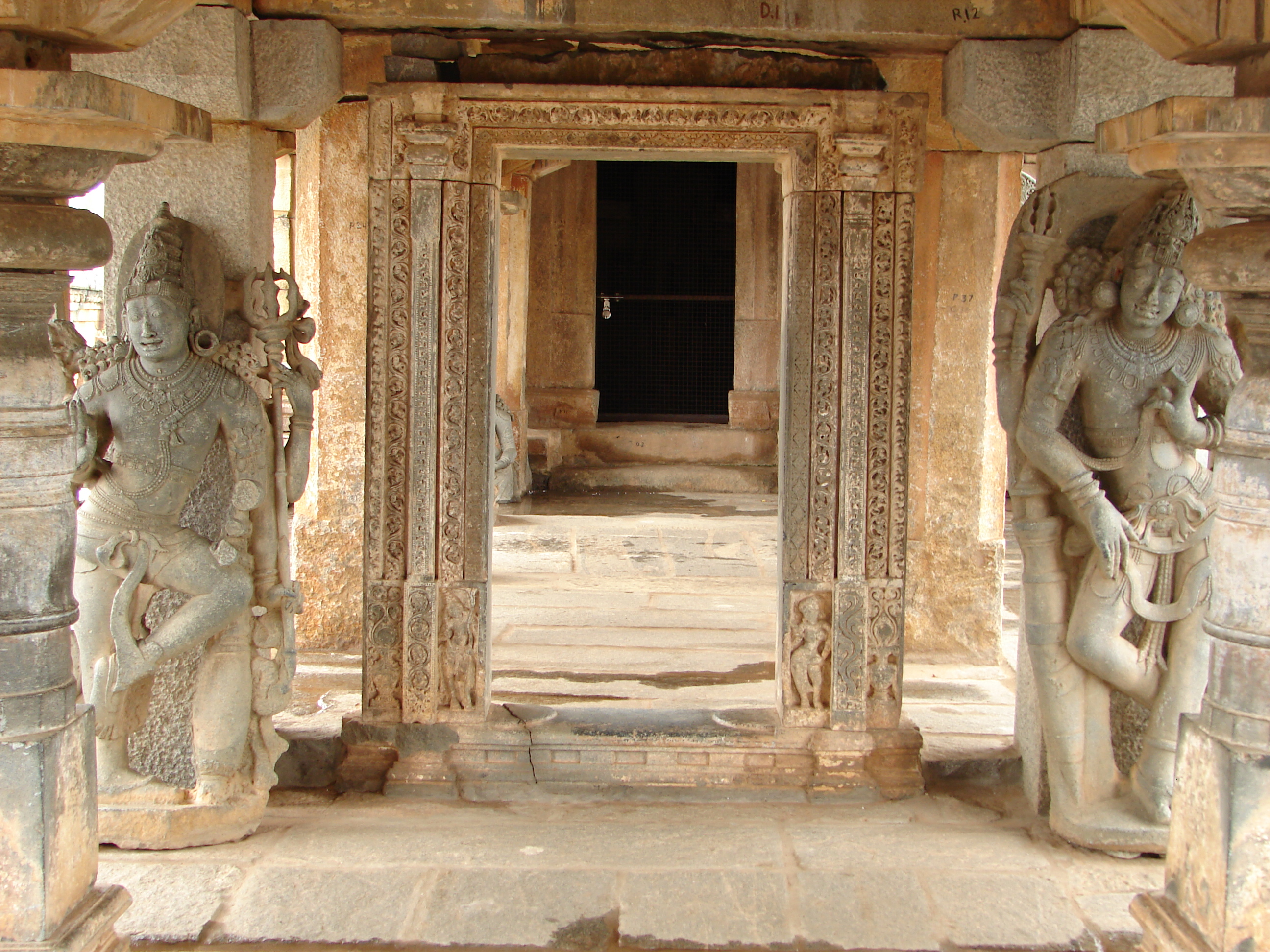
A mantapa (hall) at the Jain Panchakuta basadi of 9th–10th century at Kambadahalli

Jainism became popular in the dynasty in the 8th century when the ruler King Shivamara I constructed numerous Jain basadis. King Butuga II and minister Chavundaraya were staunch Jains which is evident from the construction of the Gommateshwara monolithic statue. Jains worshipped the twenty four tirthankars (Jinas) whose images were consecrated in their temples. The worship of the footprint of spiritual leaders such as those of Bhadrabahu in Shravanabelagola from the 10th century is considered a parallel to Buddhism. Some brahminical influences are seen in the consecration of the Gomateshwara monolith which is the statue of Bahubali, the son of Tirthankar Adinatha (just as Hindus worshipped the sons of Shiva). The worship of subordinate deities such as yaksa and yaksi, earlier considered as mere attendants of the tirthankars was seen from the 7th century to the 12th century.

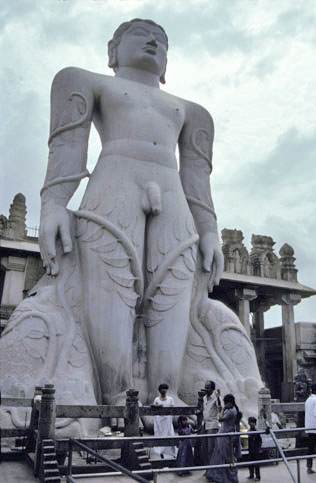
Gommateshwara at Shravanabelagola (982–983) C.E.

Vedic Brahminism was popular in the 6th and 7th centuries when inscriptions refer to grants made to Srotriya Brahmins. These inscriptions also describe the gotra (lineage) affiliation to royal families and their adherence of such Vedic rituals as asvamedha (horse sacrifice) and hiranyagarbha. Brahmins and kings enjoyed a mutually beneficial relationship; rituals performed by the brahmins gave legitimacy to kings and the land grants made by kings to brahmins elevated them in society to the level of wealthy landowners. Vaishnavism however maintained a low profile and not many inscriptions describe grants towards its cause. Some Vaishnava temples were built by the Gangas such as the Narayanaswami temples at Nanjangud, Sattur and Hangala in modern Mysore district. The deity Vishnu was depicted with four arms holding a conch (sanka), discus (cakra), mace (gada) and lotus (padma).

From the beginning of the 8th century, patronage to Shaivism increased in every section of the society; the landed elite, landlords, assemblies (samaya), schools of learning (aghraharas) and minor ruling families such as the Bana, Nolamba and Chalukya clans. The Shaiva temples contained a Shiva linga in the sanctum sanctorum along with images of the mother goddess, Surya (Sun god) and Nandi (a bull and attendant of Shiva) which was normally enshrined in a separate pavilion facing the sanctum. The linga was man made and in some cases had etchings of Ganapati (son of Shiva) and Parvati (consort and wife of Shiva) on it. Due to the vigorous efforts of priests and ascetics, Shaiva monastic orders flourished in many places such as Nandi Hills, Avani and Hebbata in modern Kolar district.

=== Society ===
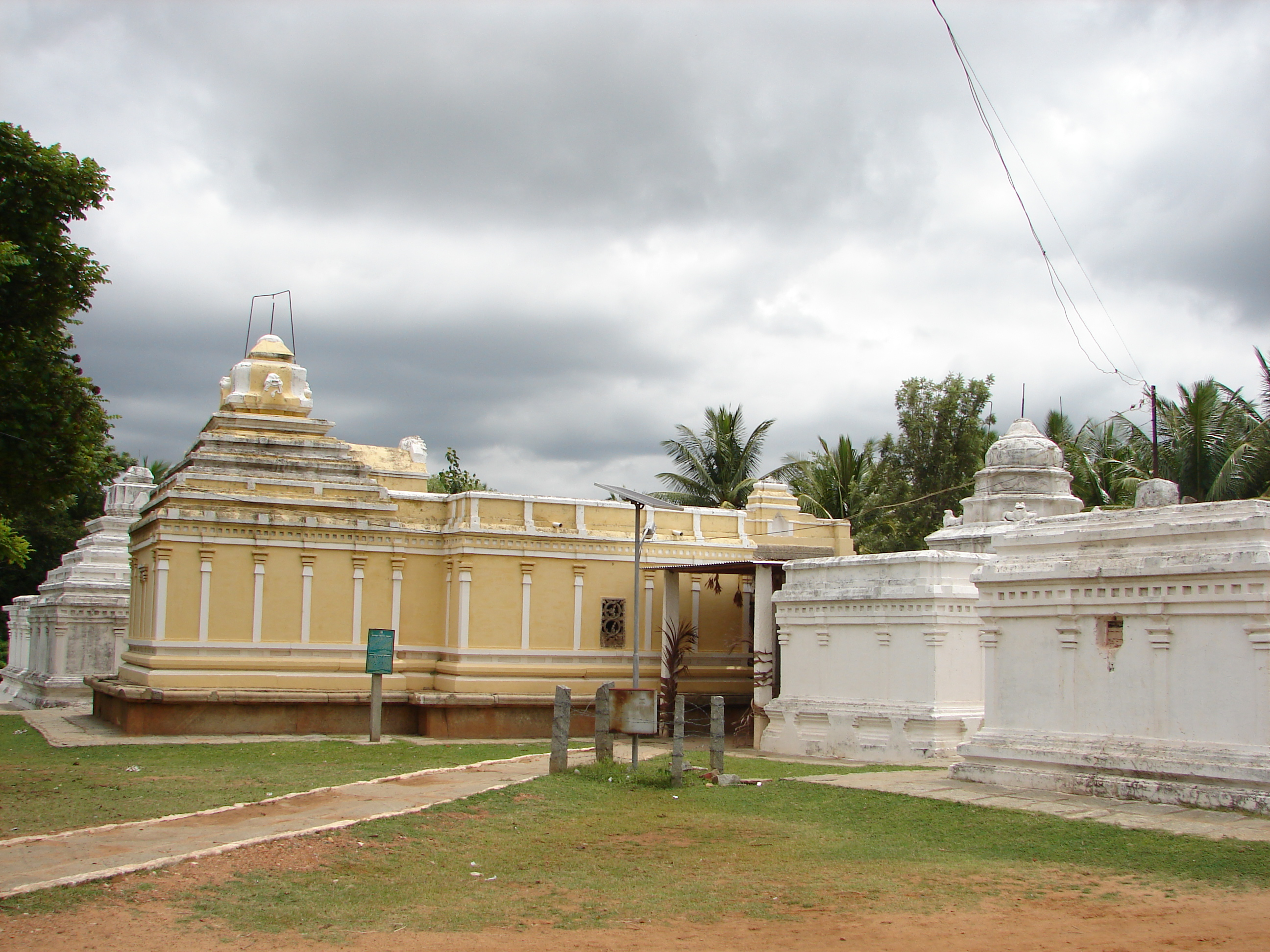
Kalleshwara Temple Complex, built in the 10th century by the Nolambas, a Western Ganga feudatory, at Aralaguppe in the Tumkur district

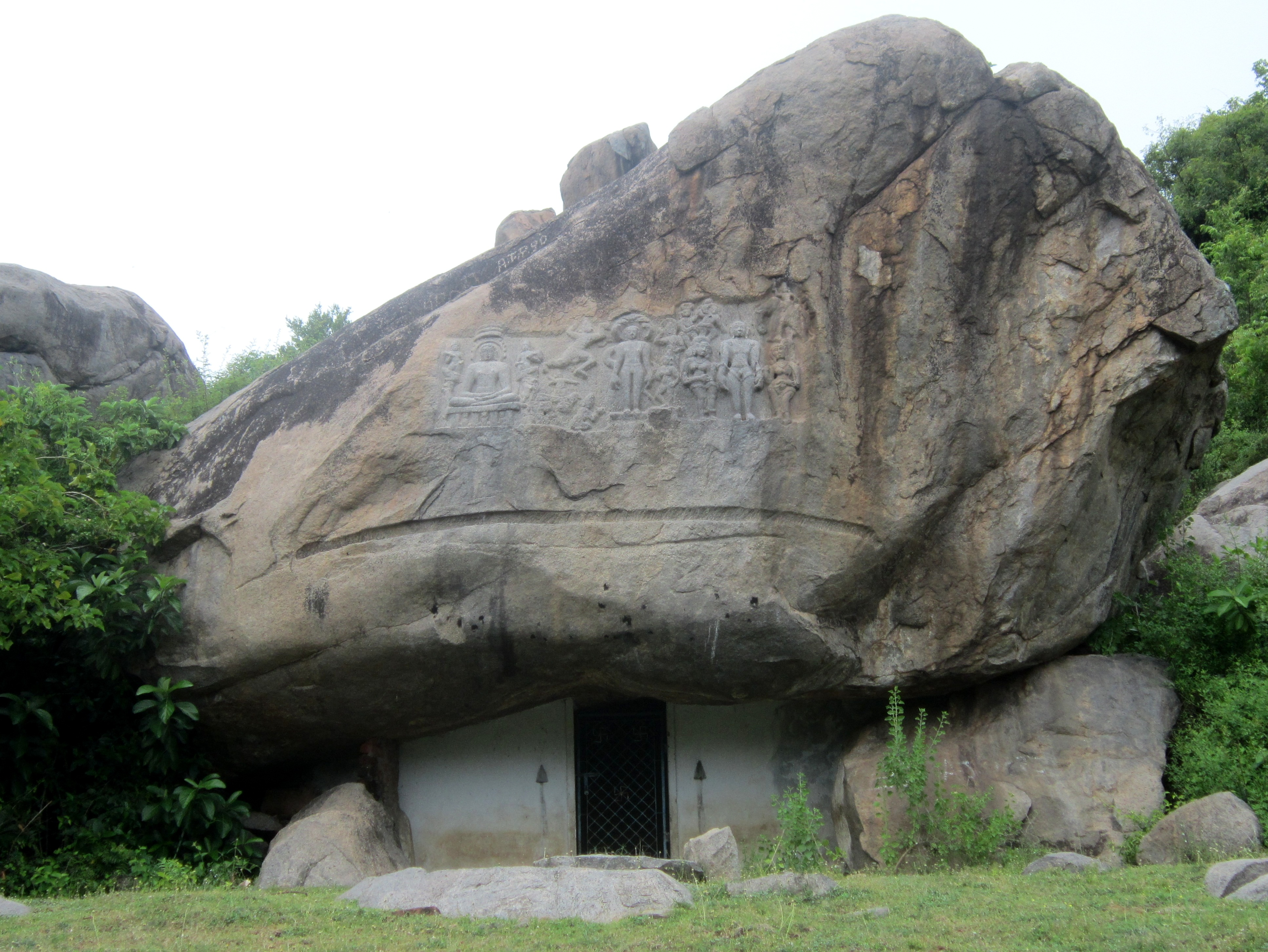
Seeyamangalam Mahavira Rock Cut Temple

The Western Ganga society in many ways reflected the emerging religious, political and cultural developments of those times. Women became active in local administration because Ganga kings distributed territorial responsibility to their queens such as the feudal queen Parabbaya-arasi of Kundattur and the queens of King Sripurusha, Butuga II and feudal king Permadi. Inheritance of fiscal and administrative responsibility by the son-in-law, the wife or by the daughter is evident. The position of prime minister of King Ereganga II and position of nalgavunda (local landlord) bestowed upon Jakkiabbe, the wife of a fallen hero are examples. When Jakkiabbe took to asceticism, her daughter inherited the position.

The devadasi system (sule or courtesan) in temples was prevalent and was modelled after the structures in the royal palace. Contemporaneous literature such a Vaddaradhane makes a mention of the chief queen (Dharani Mahadevi) accompanied by lower ranking queens (arasiyargal) and courtesans of the women's royal quarter (pendarasada suleyargal). Some of the courtesans and concubines employed in the harem of the kings and chieftains were well respected, examples being Nandavva at whose instance a local chief made land grant to a Jain temple. Education in the royal family was closely supervised and included such subjects as political science, elephant and horse riding, archery, medicine, poetry, grammar, drama, literature, dance, singing and use of musical instruments. Brahmins enjoyed an influential position in society and were exempt from certain taxes and customs due on land. In turn they managed public affairs such as teaching, local judiciary, functioned as trustees and bankers, managed schools, temples, irrigation tanks, rest houses, collected taxes due from villages and raised money from public subscriptions.

By virtue of a Hindu belief that killing of a brahmin (Bramhatya) was a sin, capital punishment was not applicable to them. Upper caste kshatriyas (satkshatriya) were also exempt from capital punishment due to their higher position in the caste system. Severe crimes committed were punishable by the severing of a foot or hand. Contemporary literary sources reveal up to ten castes in the Hindu caste system; three among kshatriya, three among brahmin, two among vaishya and two among shudras. Family laws permitted a wife or daughter or surviving relatives of a deceased person to claim properties such as his home, land, grain, money etc. if there were no male heirs. If no claimants to the property existed, the state took possession of these properties as Dharmadeya (charitable asset). Intercaste marriage, child marriage, marriage of a boy to maternal uncles daughter, Svayamvara marriage (where the bride garlands her choice of a groom from among many aspirants) were all in vogue. Memorials containing hero stones (Viragallu) were erected for fallen heroes and the concerned family received monetary aid for maintenance of the memorial.

The presence of numerous Mahasatikals (or Mastikal – hero stones for a woman who accepted ritual death upon the demise of her husband) indicates the popularity of Sati among royalty. Ritual death by sallekhana and by jalasamadhi (drowning in water) were also practiced. Popular clothing among men was the use of two unrestricted garments, a Dhoti as a lower garment and a plain cloth as upper garment while women wore Saris with stitched petticoats. Turbans were popular with men of higher standing and people used umbrellas made with bamboo or reeds. Ornaments were popular among men and women and even elephants and horses were decorated. Men wore finger rings, necklaces (honnasara and honnagala sara), bracelets (Kaduga) and wristlets (Kaftkina). Women wore a nose jewel (bottu), nose ring (mugutti), bangles (bale or kankana) and various types of necklaces (honna gante sara and kati sutra). During leisure, men amused themselves with horse riding, watching wrestling bouts, cock fights and ram fights. There existed a large and well organised network of schools for imparting higher education and these schools were known by various names such as agraharas, ghatikas, brahmapura or matha. Inscriptions mention schools of higher education at Salotgi, Balligavi, Talagunda, Aihole, Arasikere and other places.

=== Literature ===
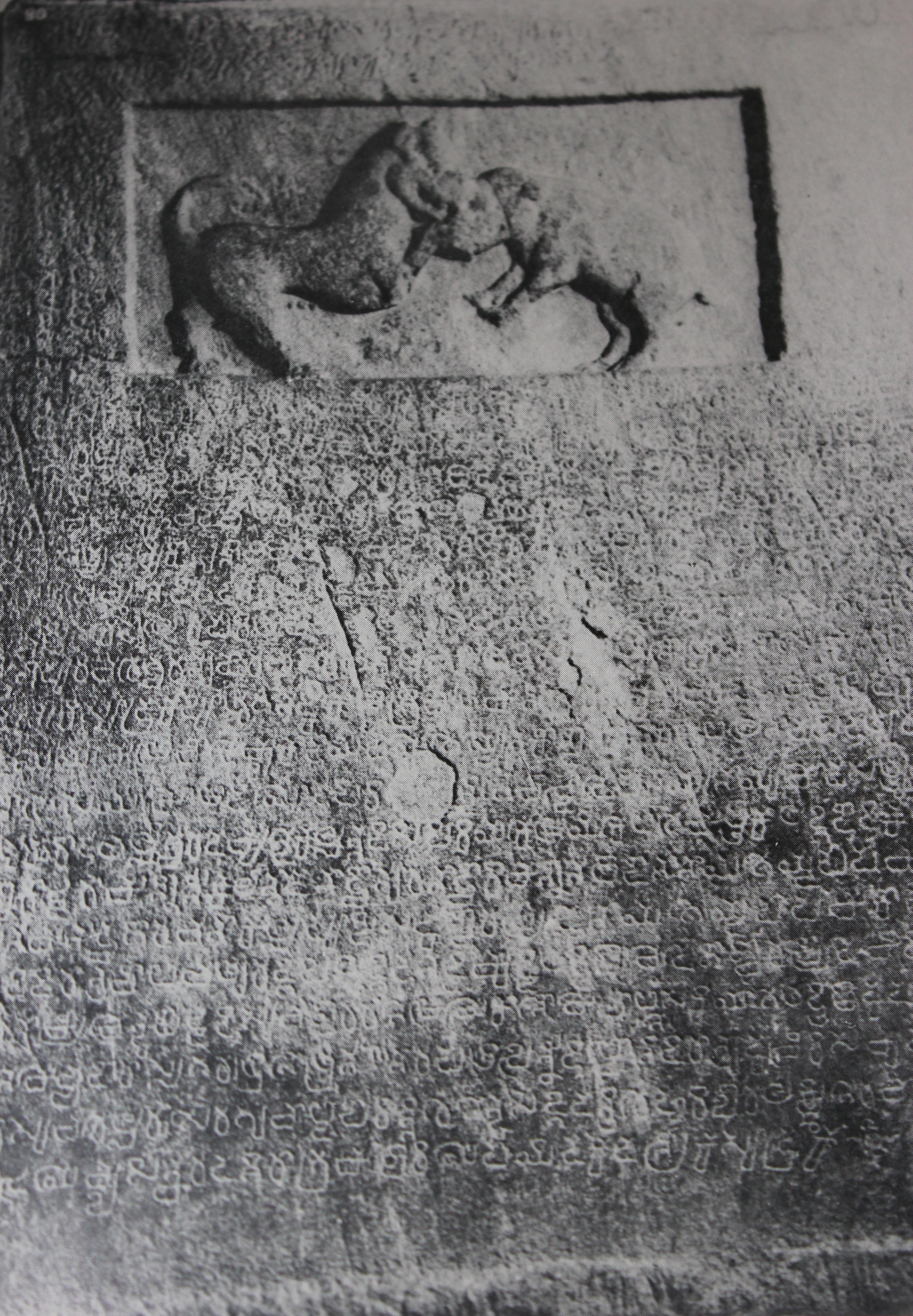
The famous Atakur inscription (949 C.E.), a classical Kannada composition pertaining to the Western Ganga-Rashtrakuta victory over the Chola dynasty of Tanjore in the famous battle of Takkolam

The Western Ganga rule was a period of brisk literary activity in Sanskrit and Kannada, though many of the writings are now considered extinct and are known only from references made to them. Chavundaraya's writing, Chavundaraya Purana (or Trishashtilakshana mahapurana) of 978 CE, is an early existing work in prose style in Kannada and contains a summary of the Sanskrit writings, Adipurana and Uttarapurana which were written a century earlier by Jinasena and Gunabhadra during the rule of Rashtrakuta Amoghavarsha I. The prose, composed in lucid Kannada, was mainly meant for the common man and avoided any reference to complicated elements of Jain doctrines and philosophy. His writings seem to be influenced by the writings of his predecessor Adikavi Pampa and contemporary Ranna. The work narrates the legends of a total of 63 Jain proponents including twenty-four Jain Tirthankar, twelve Chakravartis, nine Balabhadras, nine Narayanas and nine Pratinarayanas.

The earliest postulated Kannada writer from this dynasty is King Durvinita of the 6th century. Kavirajamarga of 850 CE, refers to a Durvinita as an early writer of Kannada prose. Around 900 CE, Gunavarma I authored the Kannada works, Shudraka and Harivamsha. His writings are considered extinct but references to these writings are found in later years. He is known to have been patronised by King Ereganga Neetimarga II. In Shudraka, he has favourably compared his patron to King Shudraka of ancient times. The great Kannada poet Ranna was patronised by Chavundaraya in his early literary days. Ranna's classic Parashurama charite is considered a eulogy of his patron who held such titles as Samara Parashurama.

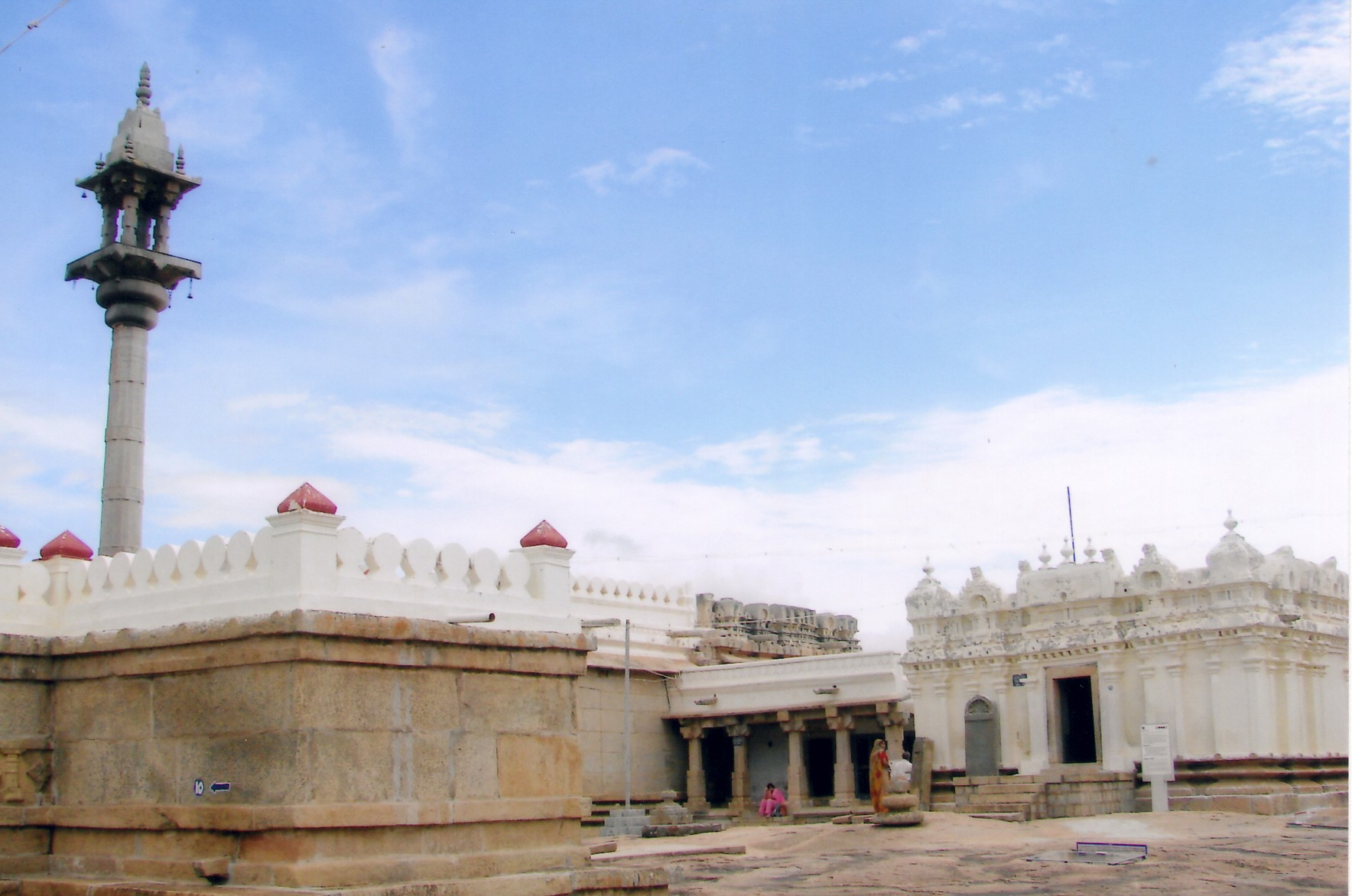
Mahasthambha (pillar) and Chandragupta Basadi at Chandragiri Hill in Shravanabelagola

Nagavarma I, a brahmin scholar who came from Vengi in modern Andhra Pradesh (late 10th century) was also patronised by Chavundaraya. He wrote Chandombudhi (ocean of prosody) addressed to his wife. This is considered the earliest available Kannada writing in prosody. He also wrote one of the earliest available romance classics in Kannada called Karnataka Kadambari in sweet and flowing champu (mixed verse and prose) style. It is based on an earlier romantic work in Sanskrit by poet Bana and is popular among critics. Gajashtaka (hundred verses on elephants), a rare Kannada work on elephant management was written by King Shivamara II around 800 CE but this work is now considered extinct. Other writers such as Manasiga and Chandrabhatta were known to be popular in the 10th century.

In an age of classical Sanskrit literature, Madhava II (brother of King Vishnugopa) wrote a treatise Dattaka Sutravritti which was based on an earlier work on erotics by a writer called Dattaka. A Sanskrit version of Vaddakatha, a commentary on Pāṇini's grammar called Sabdavathara and a commentary on the 15th chapter of a Sanskrit work called Kiratarjunneya by poet Bharavi (who was in Durvinita's court) are ascribed to Durvinita. King Shivamara II is known to have written Gajamata Kalpana. Hemasena, also known as Vidya Dhananjaya authored Raghavapandaviya, a narration of the stories of Rama and the Pandavas simultaneously through puns. Gayachintamani and Kshatrachudamini which were based on poet Bana's work Kadambari were written by Hemasena's pupil Vadeebhasimha in prose style. and Chavundaraya wrote Charitarasara.

=== Architecture ===
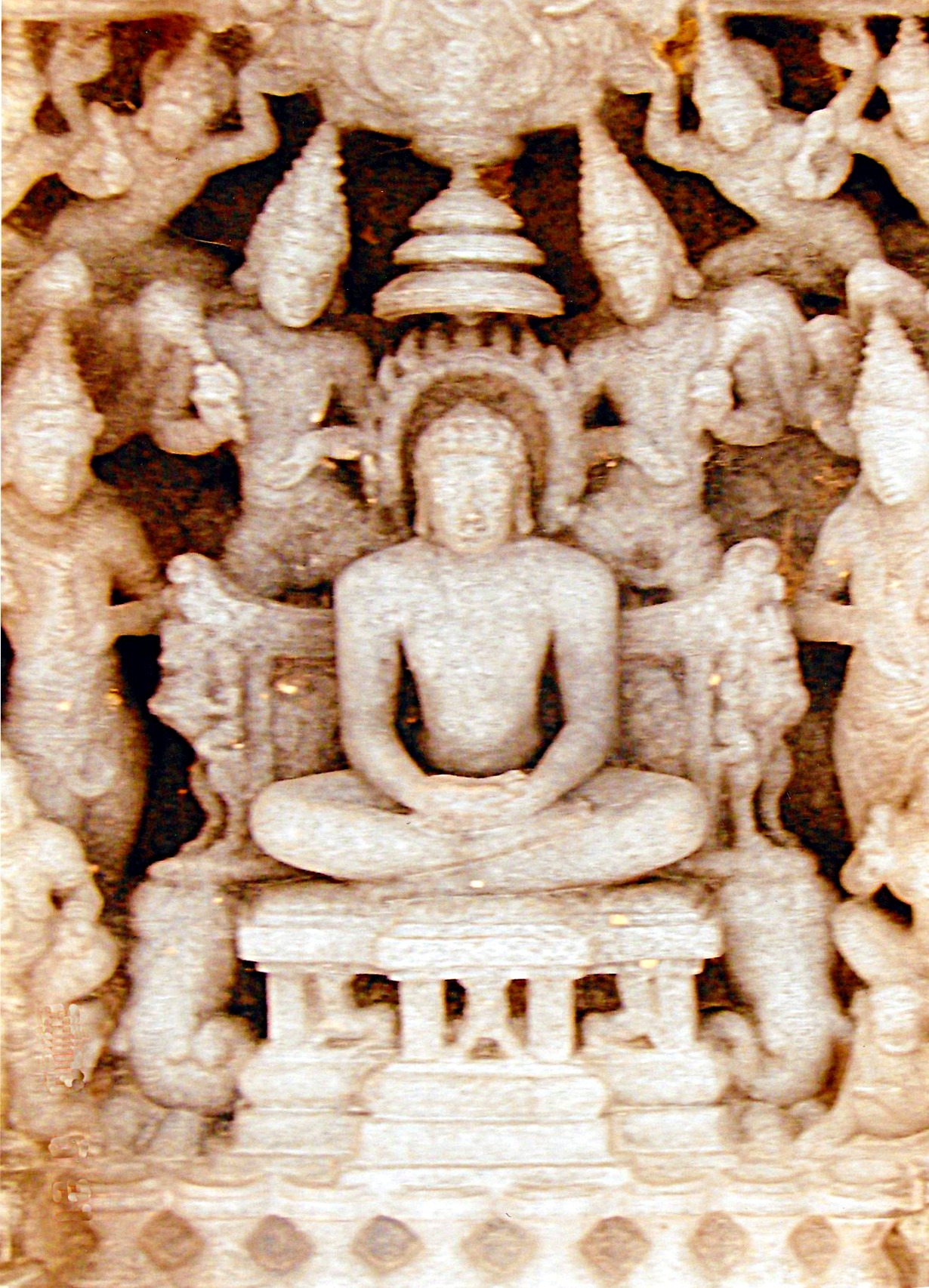
Ceiling sculpture, Panchakuta Basadi, Kambadahalli

The Western Ganga style of architecture was influenced by the Pallava and Badami Chalukya architectural features, in addition to indigenous Jain features. The Ganga pillars with a conventional lion at the base and a circular shaft of the pillar on its head, the stepped Vimana of the shrine with horizontal mouldings and square pillars were features inherited from the Pallavas. These features are also found in structures built by their subordinates, the Banas and Nolambas.

The monolith of Gomateshwara commissioned by Chavundaraya is considered the high point of the Ganga sculptural contribution in ancient Karnataka. Carved from fine-grained white granite, the image stands on a lotus. It has no support up to the thighs and is 60 feet (18 m) tall with the face measuring 6.5 feet (2.0 m). With the serene expression on the face of the image, its curled hair with graceful locks, its proportional anatomy, the monolith size, and the combination of its artistry and craftsmanship have led it to be called the mightiest achievement in sculptural art in medieval Karnataka. It is the largest monolithic statue in the world. Their free standing pillars called Mahasthambha or Bhrahmasthambha are also considered unique, examples of which are the Brahmadeva pillar and Tyagada Brahmadeva Pillar. At the top of the pillar whose shaft (cylindrical or octagonal) is decorated with creepers and other floral motifs is the seated Brahma and the base of the pillar normally has engravings of important Jain personalities and inscriptions.

Other important contributions are the Jain basadis' whose towers have gradually receding stories (talas) ornamented with small models of temples. These tiny shrines have in them engravings of tirthankars (Jain saints). Semicircular windows connect the shrines and decorative Kirtimukha (demon faces) are used at the top. The Chavundaraya basadi built in the 10th or 11th century, Chandragupta basadi built in the 6th century and the monolithic of Gomateshwara of 982 are the most important monuments at Shravanabelagola. Some features were added to the Chandragupta basadi by famous Hoysala sculptor Dasoja in the 12th century. The decorative doorjambs and perforated screen windows which depict scenes from the life of King Chandragupta Maurya are known to be his creation. The Panchakuta Basadi at Kambadahalli (five towered Jan temple) of about 900 with a Brahmadeva pillar is an excellent example of Dravidian art. The wall niches here are surmounted by torana (lintel) with carvings of floral motifs, flying divine creatures (gandharva) and imaginary monsters (makara) ridden by Yaksas (attendants of saints) while the niches are occupied by images of tirthankars themselves. Other notable constructions were the Vallimalai Jain caves and the Seeyamangalam Jain temple during the reign of Rachamalla II, and the 5th or 6th century Parshvanatha temple at the Kanakagiri Jain tirth.

The Gangas built many Hindu temples with impressive Dravidian gopuras containing stucco figures from the Hindu pantheon, decorated pierced screen windows which are featured in the mantapa (hall) along with saptamatrika carvings (seven heavenly mothers). Some well known examples are the Arakeshvara Temple at Hole Alur, Kapileswara temple at Manne, Kolaramma temple at Kolar, Rameshvara temple at Narasamangala, Nagareshvara temple at Begur and the Kallesvara temple at Aralaguppe. At Talakad they built the Maralesvara temple, the Arakesvara temple and the Patalesvara temple. Unlike the Jain temples where floral frieze decoration is common, Hindu temples were distinguished by friezes (slab of stone with decorative sculptures) illustrating episodes from the epics and puranas. Another unique legacy of the Gangas are the number of Viragallu (hero stones) they have left behind; memorials containing sculptural details in relief of war scenes, Hindu deities, saptamatrikas, Jain tirthankars and ritual death (such as the Doddahundi hero stone).

==== List of notable temples from the Western Ganga era ====
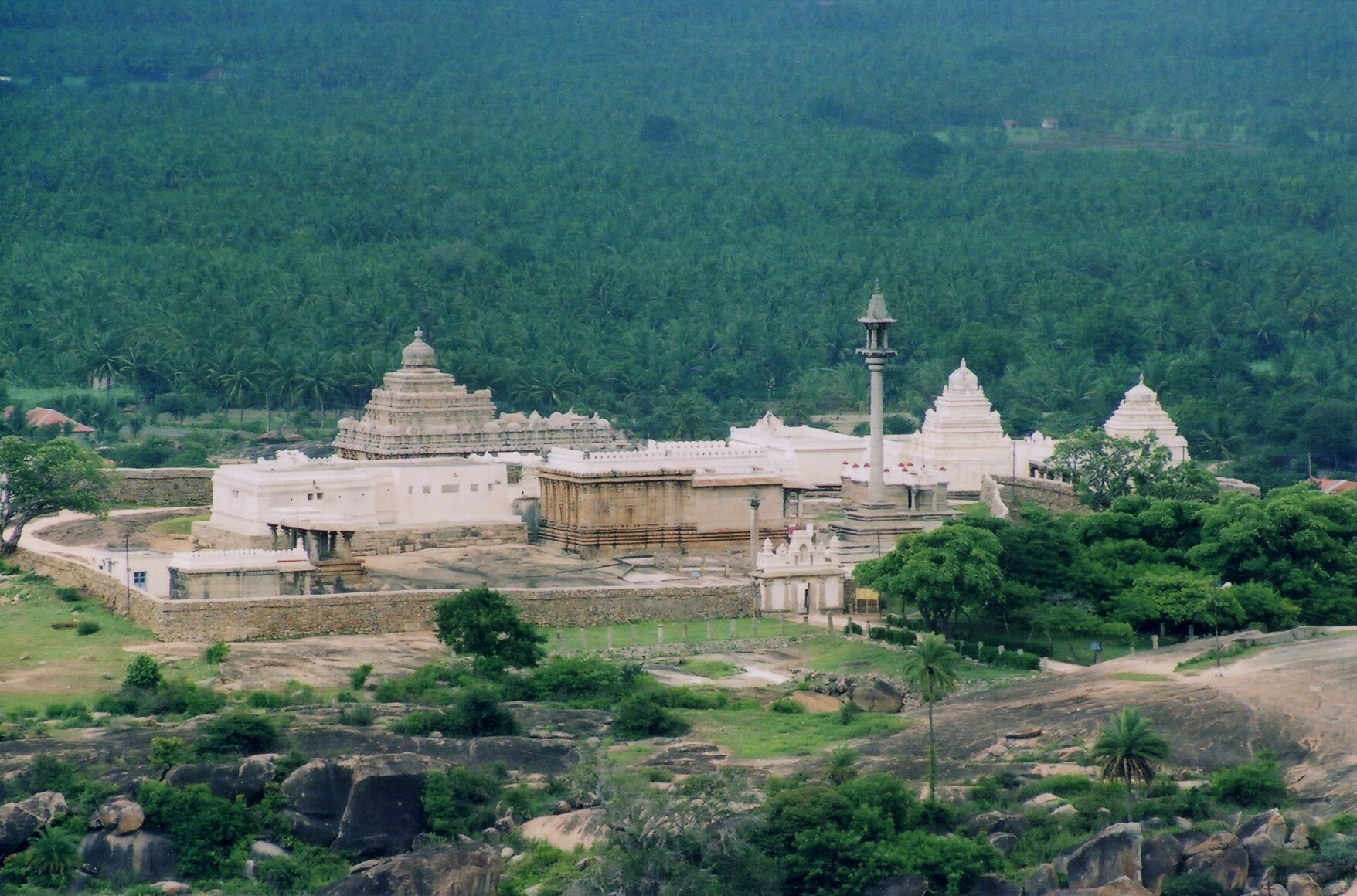
Chandragiri hill temple complex at Shravanabelagola

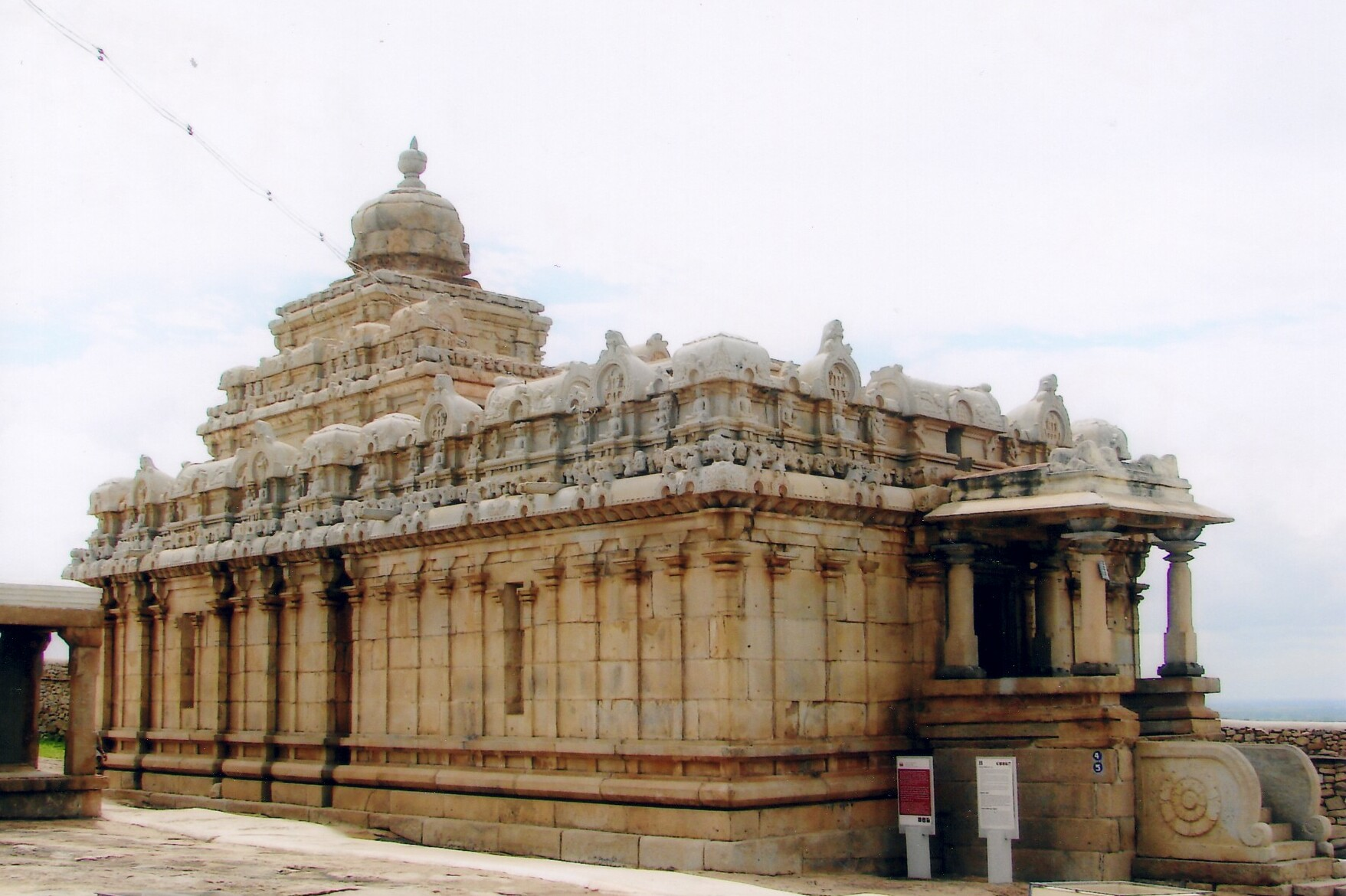
Chavundaraya basadi on Chandragiri hill in Shravanabelagola temple complex

Name	Location	Period	Deity
Kanakagiri Jain tirth	Kanakagiri	5th-6th century AD	Pārśvanātha
Panchakuta Basadi	Kambadahalli	8th-10th century AD	Rishabhanatha
Vallimalai Jain caves	Vallimalai	870 CE	Tirthankara
Seeyamangalam cave temple	Seeyamangalam	9th century AD	Mahavira
Nageshvara Temple, Begur	Begur	9th century	Shiva
Rameshvara Temple, Narasamangala	Narasamangala	9th century AD	Shiva
Kalleshvara Temple, Aralaguppe	Aralaguppe	9th century AD	Shiva
Gommateshwara Temple	Shravanbelagola	981 CE	Bahubali
Chavundaraya Basadi	Shravanbelagola	982 CE	Neminatha
Chandragupta basadi	Shravanbelagola	9th-10th century AD	Pārśvanātha
Parshvanatha basadi	Shravanbelagola	10th century AD	Pārśvanātha
Kattale Basadi	Shravanbelagola	10th century AD	Rishabhanatha
Arakeshvara Temple	Hole Alur	10th century AD	Shiva

=== Language ===
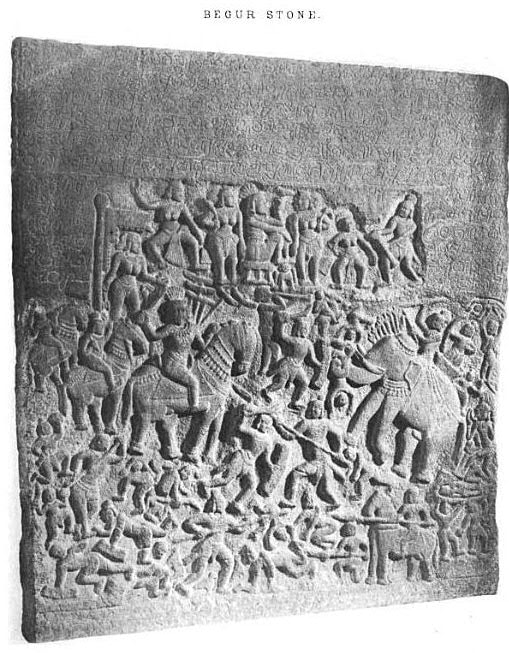
The famous Begur inscription in old Kannada, dated to c. 908–938 CE, from the rule of Western Ganga dynasty King Ereyappa.

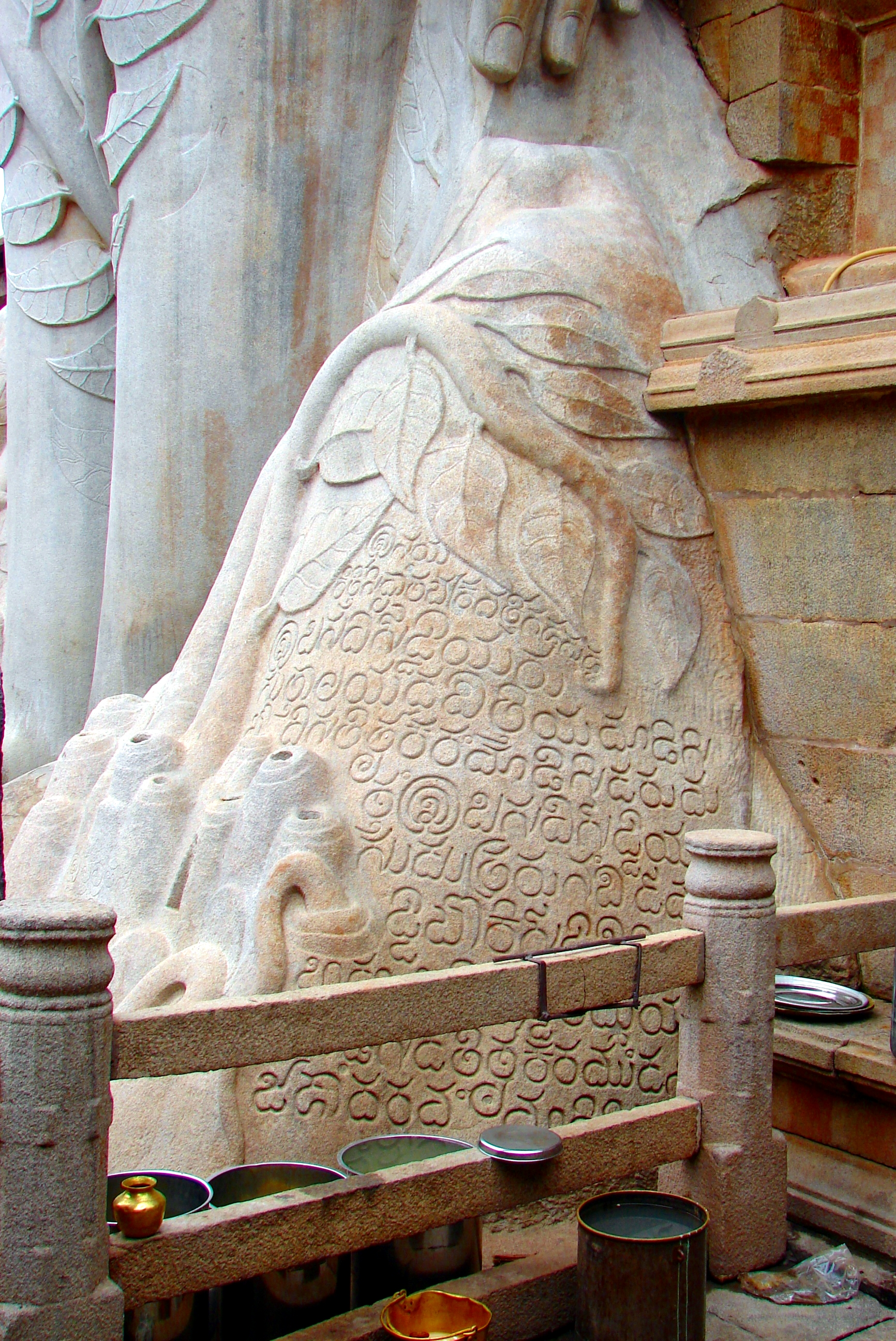
Old Kannada inscription at the base of Gomateshwara monolith in Shravanabelagola (981 CE.)

The Western Gangas used Kannada and Sanskrit extensively as their language of administration. Some of their inscriptions are also bilingual in these languages. In bilingual inscriptions the formulaic passages stating origin myths, genealogies, titles of Kings and benedictions tended to be in Sanskrit, while the actual terms of the grant such as information on the land or village granted, its boundaries, participation of local authorities, rights and obligations of the grantee, taxes and dues and other local concerns were in the local language. The usage of these two languages showed important changes over the centuries. During the first phase (350–725), Sanskrit copper plates dominated, indicating the initial ascendancy of the local language as a language of administration and the fact that majority of the records from this phase were brahmadeya grants (grants to Brahmin temples). In the second phase (725–1000), lithic inscriptions in Kannada outnumbered Sanskrit copper plates, consistent with the patronage Kannada received from rich and literate Jains who used Kannada as their medium to spread the Jain faith. Recent excavations at Tumbula near Mysore have revealed a set of early copper plate bilingual inscriptions dated 444. The genealogy of the kings of the dynasty is described in Sanskrit while Kannada was used to describe the boundary of the village.

An interesting inscription discovered at Beguru near modern Bangalore that deserves mention is the epigraph dated 890 that refers to a Bengaluru war. This is in Hale Kannada (old Kannada) language and is the earliest mention of the name of Bangalore city. The Western Gangas minted coins with Kannada and Nagari legends, the most common feature on their coins was the image of an elephant on the obverse and floral petal symbols on the reverse. The Kannada legend Bhadr, a royal umbrella or a conch shell appeared on top of the elephant image. The denominations are the pagoda (weighing 52 grains), the fanam weighting one tenth or one half of the pagoda and the quarter fanams.

== Timeline ==
The template below shows the Timeline of Karnataka. Note the extent of time (around 701 years) the Ganga kingdom flourished.

== See also ==
- History of India
- History of South India
- Kongu Chera dynasty

Timeline and cultural period	Indus plain (Punjab-Sapta Sindhu-Gujarat)	Gangetic Plain			Central India	Southern India
Timeline and cultural period	Indus plain (Punjab-Sapta Sindhu-Gujarat)	Upper Gangetic Plain (Ganga-Yamuna doab)	Middle Gangetic Plain	Lower Gangetic Plain	Central India	Southern India
IRON AGE
Culture	Late Vedic Period	Late Vedic Period; Painted Grey Ware culture	Late Vedic Period; Northern Black Polished Ware		Pre-history	
6th century BCE	Gandhara	Kuru-Panchala	Magadha		Adivasi (tribes)	Assaka
Culture	Persian-Greek influences	"Second Urbanisation"; Rise of Shramana movements Jainism - Buddhism - Ājīvika - Yoga			Pre-history	
5th century BCE	(Persian conquests)		Shaishunaga dynasty		Adivasi (tribes)	Assaka
4th century BCE	(Greek conquests)	Nanda empire				
HISTORICAL AGE
Culture	Spread of Buddhism				Pre-history	
3rd century BCE	Maurya Empire					Satavahana dynasty Sangam period (300 BCE – 200 CE); Early Cholas; Early Pandyan kingdom Cheras
Culture	Preclassical Hinduism (Note: Michaels (2004) p.39) - "Hindu Synthesis" (Note: Hiltebeitel (2002)) (ca. 200 BCE - 300 CE) (Note: Michaels (2004) p.39) (Note: Hiltebeitel (2002)); Epics - Puranas - Ramayana - Mahabharata - Bhagavad Gita - Brahma Sutras - Smarta Tradition; Mahayana Buddhism					
2nd century BCE	Indo-Greek Kingdom		Shunga Empire; Maha-Meghavahana Dynasty			Satavahana dynasty Sangam period (300 BCE – 200 CE); Early Cholas; Early Pandyan kingdom Cheras
1st century BCE	Indo-Greek Kingdom		Shunga Empire; Maha-Meghavahana Dynasty			Satavahana dynasty Sangam period (300 BCE – 200 CE); Early Cholas; Early Pandyan kingdom Cheras
1st century CE	Indo-Scythians; Indo-Parthians		Kuninda Kingdom			Satavahana dynasty Sangam period (300 BCE – 200 CE); Early Cholas; Early Pandyan kingdom Cheras
2nd century	Kushan Empire					Satavahana dynasty Sangam period (300 BCE – 200 CE); Early Cholas; Early Pandyan kingdom Cheras
3rd century	Kushano-Sasanian Kingdom; Western Satraps	Kushan Empire		Kamarupa kingdom	Adivasi (tribes)	Satavahana dynasty Sangam period (300 BCE – 200 CE); Early Cholas; Early Pandyan kingdom Cheras
Culture	"Golden Age of Hinduism"(ca. CE 320-650) (Note: Michaels (2004) p.40); Puranas - Kural; Co-existence of Hinduism and Buddhism					
4th century	Kidarites	Gupta Empire; Varman dynasty				Andhra Ikshvakus; Kalabhra dynasty Kadamba Dynasty; Western Ganga Dynasty
5th century	Hephthalite Empire	Alchon Huns				Vishnukundina; Kalabhra dynasty
6th century	Nezak Huns; Kabul Shahi; Maitraka				Adivasi (tribes)	Vishnukundina; Badami Chalukyas; Kalabhra dynasty
Culture	Late-Classical Hinduism (ca. CE 650-1100) (Note: Michaels (2004) p.41); Advaita Vedanta - Tantra; Decline of Buddhism in India					
7th century	Indo-Sassanids		Vakataka dynasty Empire of Harsha	Mlechchha dynasty	Adivasi (tribes)	Badami Chalukyas; Eastern Chalukyas; Pandyan kingdom (revival); Pallava
7th century	Karkota dynasty				Adivasi (tribes)	
8th century	Kabul Shahi	Pala Empire			Adivasi (tribes)	Eastern Chalukyas; Pandyan kingdom Kalachuri
9th century	Gurjara-Pratihara				Adivasi (tribes)	Rashtrakuta Empire; Eastern Chalukyas; Pandyan kingdom Medieval Cholas; Chera Perumals of Makkotai
10th century	Ghaznavids			Pala dynasty Kamboja-Pala dynasty	Adivasi (tribes)	Kalyani Chalukyas; Eastern Chalukyas; Medieval Cholas; Chera Perumals of Makkotai; Rashtrakuta
References and sources for table References Sources: Flood, Gavin D. (1996), An Introduction to Hinduism, Cambridge University Press; Hiltebeitel, Alf (2002), Hinduism. In: Joseph Kitagawa, "The Religious Traditions of Asia: Religion, History, and Culture", Routledge; Michaels, Axel (2004), Hinduism. Past and present, Princeton, New Jersey: Princeton University Press

== Bibliography ==
Books

- Adiga, Malini (2006) [2006]. The Making of Southern Karnataka: Society, Polity and Culture in the early medieval period, AD 400–1030. Chennai: Orient Longman. ISBN 81-250-2912-5.
- Altekar, Anant Sadashiv (1934) [1934]. The Rashtrakutas And Their Times; being a political, administrative, religious, social, economic and literary history of the Deccan during C. 750 A.D. to C. 1000 A.D. Poona: Oriental Book Agency. OCLC 3793499.
- Chopra, Ravindran, Subrahmanian, P.N., T.K., N. (2003) [2003]. History of South India (Ancient, Medieval and Modern) Part I. New Delhi: Chand publications. ISBN 81-219-0153-7.
- Kamath, Suryanath U. (2001) [1980]. A concise history of Karnataka : from pre-historic times to the present. Bangalore: Jupiter books. LCCN 80905179. OCLC 7796041.
- Karmarkar, A.P. (1947) [1947]. Cultural history of Karnataka : ancient and medieval. Dharwar: Karnataka Vidyavardhaka Sangha. OCLC 8221605.
- Keay, John (2000) [2000]. India: A History. New York: Grove Publications. ISBN 0-8021-3797-0.
- Narasimhacharya, R (1988) [1988]. History of Kannada Literature. New Delhi, Madras: Asian Educational Services. ISBN 81-206-0303-6.
- Prabhu, Govindaraya S (2009). The Nolambas Coinage and History. Govindraya Prabhu S. ISBN 978-81-8465-141-6.
- Ramesh, K.V. (1984) [1984]. Chalukyas of Vatapi. Delhi: Agam Kala Prakashan. ASIN B0006EHSP0. LCCN 84900575. OCLC 13869730. OL 3007052M.
- Sarma, I.K. (1992) [1992]. Temples of the Gangas of Karnataka. New Delhi: Archaeological Survey of India. ISBN 0-19-560686-8.
- Sastri, Nilakanta K.A. (2002) [1955]. A history of South India from prehistoric times to the fall of Vijayanagar. New Delhi: Indian Branch, Oxford University Press. ISBN 0-19-560686-8.
- Thapar, Romila (2003) [2003]. Penguin History of Early India: From origins to AD 1300. New Delhi: Penguin. ISBN 0-14-302989-4.

Web

- "Gangas of Talakad" Archived 14 May 2013 at the Wayback Machine by S. Srikanta Sastri
- Arthikaje. "History of Karnataka: The Gangas of Talakad". OurKarnataka.Com. Archived from the original on 15 December 2006.
- Havalaiah, N (January 2004). "Ancient inscriptions". The Hindu. Chennai, India. Archived from the original on 18 February 2004.
- Kamat, Jyotsna. "The Ganga Dynasty". Kamat's Potpourri. Archived from the original on 30 March 2017.
- Khajane, Muralidhara (February 2006). "An ancient site connected with Jainism". The Hindu. Chennai, India. Archived from the original on 21 August 2008.
- Prabhu, Govindaraya S. "Coins of Gangas". Indian Coins. Prabhu's web page on Indian coinage. Archived from the original on 10 July 2007.
- Staff Reporter (20 August 2004). "Inscription reveals Bangalore is over 1,000 years old". The Hindu. Chennai, India. Archived from the original on 12 September 2004.
- "ICONOGRAPHY OF THE JAIN IMAGES IN THE GOVERNMENT MUSEUM". Government Museum, Chennai. Archived from the original on 30 October 2020.
- Murthi, V Narayana (5 August 2014). "'Ahimsa Walks' to Save Jain Monuments at Vallimalai". The New Indian Express.
- Jaganathan, Rijutha. "Jain heritage at Kanakagiri". Deccan Herald. Archived from the original on 3 February 2021.
- Aravamuthan, T. G. (1992), Portrait Sculpture in South India, Asian Educational Services, ISBN 9788120608009, archived from the original on 18 May 2021
- Charya, S V Upendra (2019), The Issues That Made Newsi, Notion Press, ISBN 9781684667529, archived from the original on 18 May 2021
- Jain, Vijay K. (2018), Ācārya Umāsvāmī's Tattvārthasūtra – With Explanation in English from Ācārya Pūjyapāda's Sarvārthasiddhi, Vikalp Printers, ISBN 9788193272626, archived from the original on 18 May 2021
