= Panchalinga Darshana =

Panchalinga Darshana is a holy festival held once every twelve years in the ancient temple town of Talakad on the banks of the Kaveri river in Karnataka, India.

The five temples of Kshethra Sri Vaidyanatheshwara, Sri Pathaleshwara, Sri Maruleshwara, Sri Arakeshwara, Sri Mudukuthore Mallikarjuneshwara are believed to be Panchalingas and thus have become famous. The festival takes place simultaneously at these five temples of Shiva which are decorated with plantain stalks and flowers. Here the pilgrims of Panchalinga Darshana offer their Pooja to the Gods.

The festival takes elaborate preparation as millions of pilgrims attend to participate in the ceremonies, spread over a period of five days. It was last held in 2009. The uniqueness of this festival is that the five temple poojas begin at the same time following the ancient tradition for obtaining blessings for devotees and rulers of the country.

== Pooja niyama (traditional procedure of worship) ==
The date and time for the special pooja and abhisheka are decided after consulting the Panchangam (Stellar almanac of Hindu tradition) to begin at the auspicious movement of Kuhumahuratha, which falls on Vishaka Nakshtra during the Krishnapaksha amavasaya of Karthika Somavara (Monday). This movement usually comes once seven years. The last Panchalinga Darshana was held from 20—25 November 2007 and the previous one was held 13 years earlier

Before the beginning the special pooja, the head priest accompanied by more than 10 priests, takes holy dip at the Gokarna Pushkarni (holy lake), adjacent to the lord Vadyanatheswara temple at the appointed time and brings the agrodaka (Water from the Pushkarani) to perform Ganga Pooja to the Gods.

On this occasion poojas would be performed to Lord Shakthi Ganpathi, Manonmani Devi, Chandikeshwara and Veerabhadraswamy. Later poojas shall be performed to Arakeshwara, Pathalaeswara, Maraleshwara and Mallikarjuneswara.

After the Panchalinga Darshana culminates, it would be followed by Gajaraohana, Sridivya Brahama Rathotsava (Chariot procession) will be held and Sri Shyanotsava the following day.

Theppotsava (Utsav on a Boat) is scheduled on third day and poorvaka Kailsavanahana on fourth day and the next day the event would conclude with Nandi Vahanotsava.

== Brief history of Talakadu ==
The temple town Talakadu, located on the banks of the river Cauvery, was an ancient town earlier ruled by the Kadambaas, Cholas, Chalukyas and Rastrakutas. It is about 45 km from the Mysore. An archaeologists delight, this town has come of the earliest known temples including five.

== Notes ==
Talakadu last time panchalinga Darshana was held on NOV 2013.
