= Group of temples at Talakadu, Karnataka =

Coordinates: 12.1946782°N 77.030539°E

Vaidyeshvara and others
- Hindu temples
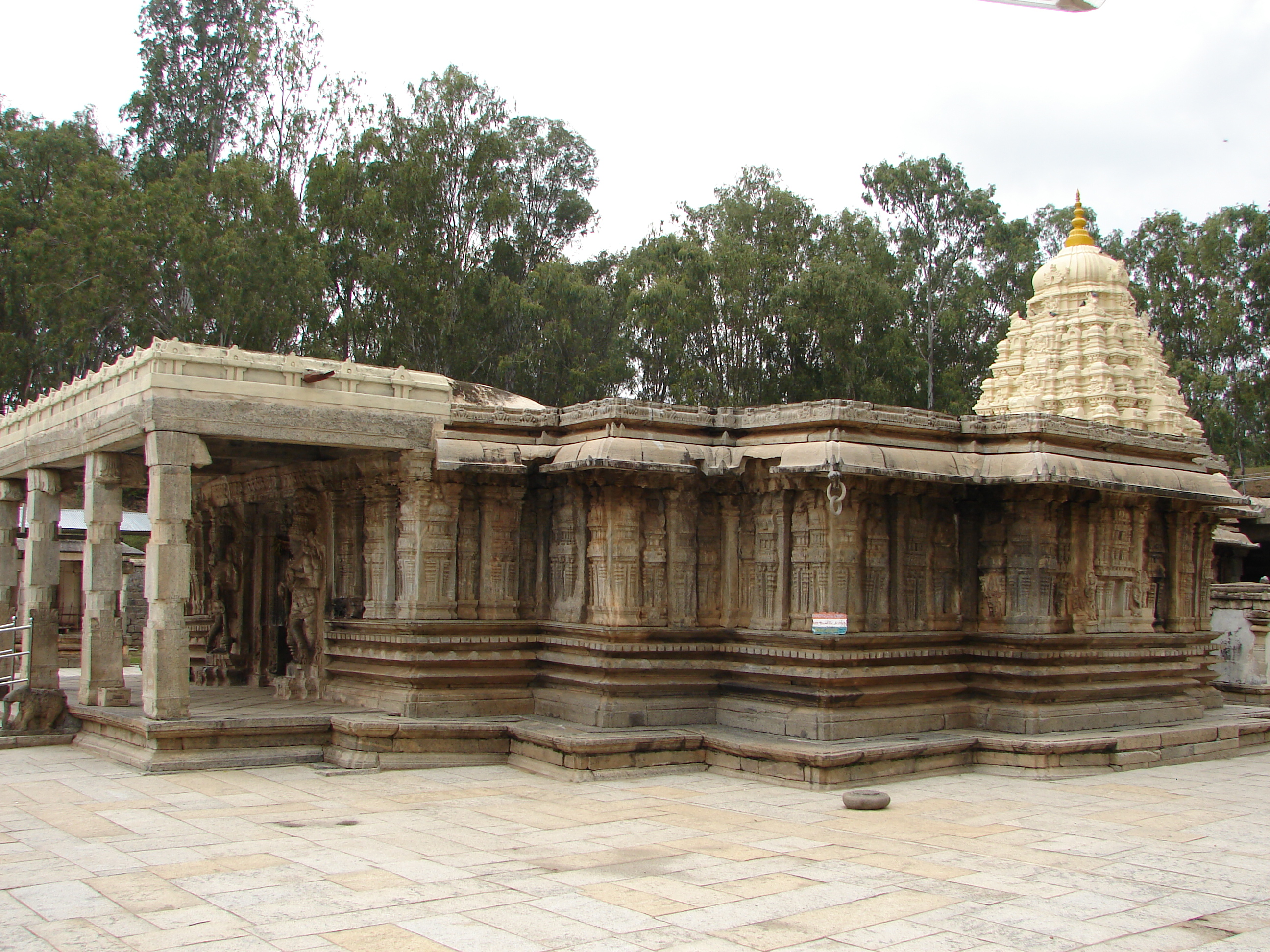
- Group of temples at Talakadu Mysore district
- Interactive map of Vaidyeshvara and others
- Country: India
- State: Karnataka
- District: Mysore District

Languages
  - Official: Kannada
- Time zone: UTC+5:30 (IST)

The Group of temples at Talakadu, located about 45 km south-east of the culturally important city of Mysore in the Karnataka state of India are ancient Hindu temples built by multiple South Indian dynasties. Archaeological excavations of the sand dunes at Talakad (or Talakadu) have shown the existence of several ruined temples built during the rule of the Western Ganga dynasty (c.345-999). However, according to historian I. K. Sarma, only two temples, the Pataleshvara (also spelt Patalesvara) and Maraleshvara (also spelt Maralesvara), built during the reign of King Rachamalla Satyavakya IV (r.975-986) are intact. According to the Archaeological Survey of India (ASI), the Vaidyeshvara temple (also spelt Vaidyesvara), the largest, the most intact and ornate of the group bears Ganga-Chola-Hoysala architectural features. Its consecration is assignable to the 10th century with improvements made up to the 14th century. According to the art historian Adam Hardy, the Kirtinarayana temple (also spelt Keertinarayana) was built in 1117 A.D. by the famous Hoysala King Vishnuvardhana to celebrate his victory over the Cholas in the battle of Talakad. It has currently been dismantled by the ASI for renovation. Only its mahadwara ("grand entrance") is intact. The Sand dunes of Talakad are protected by the Karnataka state division of the ASI. The Vaidyeshvara and Kirtinarayana temples are protected as monuments of national importance by the central Archaeological Survey of India.

== Plan of the temple ==
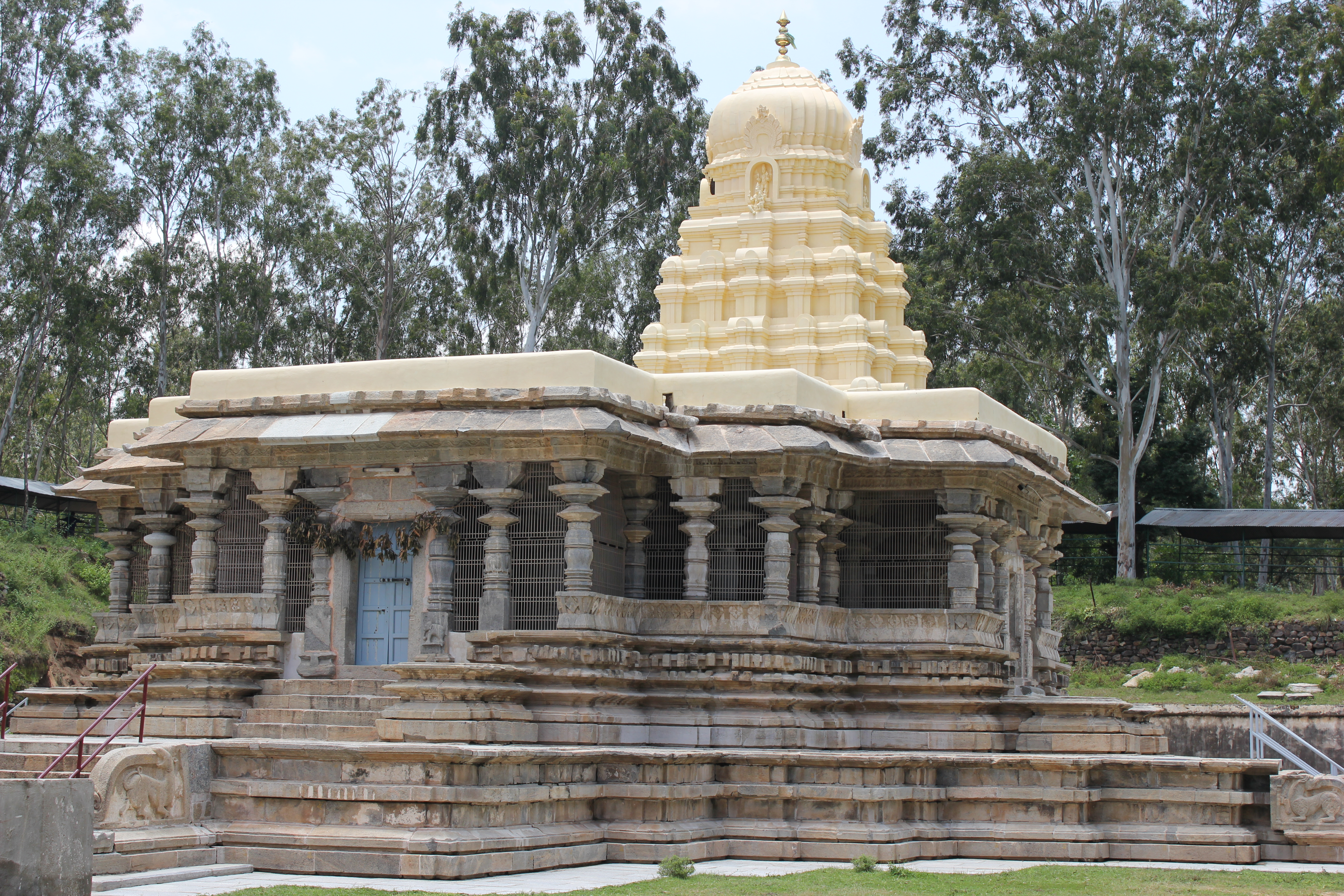
The Kirtinarayana temple at Talakad, 1117 A.D.

Both the Pataleshvara and Maraleshvara temples have on their original base (adhishsthana) a sanctum (garbhagriha) and a vestibule (ardha mantapa) from the Ganga period. The tower over the shrine may be a Chola period renovation. The pillars and the pilasters in the main hall (maha-mantapa) are similar to those in the Rameshvara Temple, Narasamangala. High quality Ganga workmanship with late Pallava influences is seen in the images of Hindu gods in these temples. These images include the four handed Mahavishnu, Durga standing on the horned head of the demon king (Asura) Mahisha and Kartikeya in the Maraleshvara temple; and the images of Dakshinamurthy (a form of Shiva), Trimurti Brahma (three faced Brahma), Simhavahini Durga (Durga riding a lion) and Shiva at the Pataleshvara temple.

The Vaidyeshvara temple comprises a sanctum with a Vesara tower (a shikhara which is a fusion of south and north Indian styles) in stucco, a vestibule that connects the sanctum to a short hall (ardhamanadapa, lit, "half-hall"), a six-pillared hall (mahamandapa or navaranga) and two entrance porchs (mukhamandapa) facing east–west and southern directions. To the north, within the temple is another large hall (mahamantapa) with shrines for deities. The entire complex is built on a platform (jagati). The outer walls of the temple are articulated with pilasters, deities from the Shaiva faith and aedicula in relief. The ornate doorjamb and lintel over the entrance doorway to the pillared hall, with the 2 m tall reliefs of door-keepers (dwarapala) on either side is typically Hoysala in workmanship. At the rear of the complex is a large bounding wall (prakara) that houses independent sculptures from the Ganga, Hoysala and Vijayanagara periods.

According to Adam Hardy, The Kirtinarayana temple is a granite, single vimana plan (tower over shrine), an ekakuta (single shrine) construction, with an open mantapa (hall). The temple is similar in plan to the famous Chennakesava Temple at Belur. The temple has a typical stellate (star-shaped) plan with the sanctum, vestibule and open hall (navaranga or just mantapa) mounted on a platform called jagati. These features are, according to historian Suryanath Kamath, standard to Hoysala architecture. The platform serves a dual purpose: improves visual effect as well as provides a path for ritual Circumambulation (Parikrama or Pradakshina) around the temple for devotees. The sanctum has an image of Narayana (another name for Vishnu). The decorative features in the temple are notable. At the entrance to the sanctum, the doorjamb and lintel are ornate, and the lathe turned pillars in the spacious hall support a ceiling that is decorated with floral designs.

Mallikarjuna temple at Mudukuthore and Sri Arkeshwaraswamy Temple are located little far from the main Talakadu village.

== Gallery ==
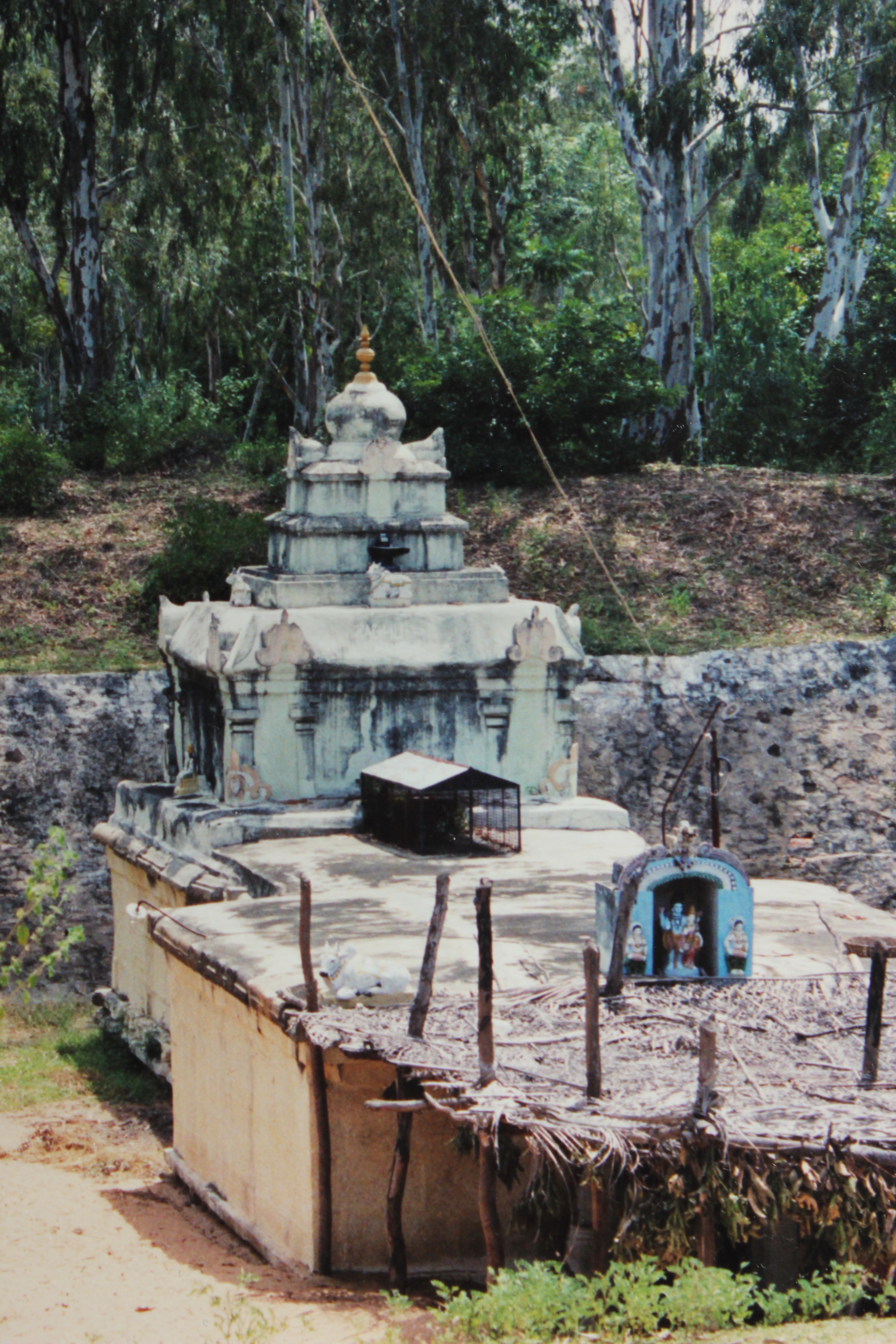
The 10th century Pataleshvara temple at Talakad has been excavated from the sand dunes.

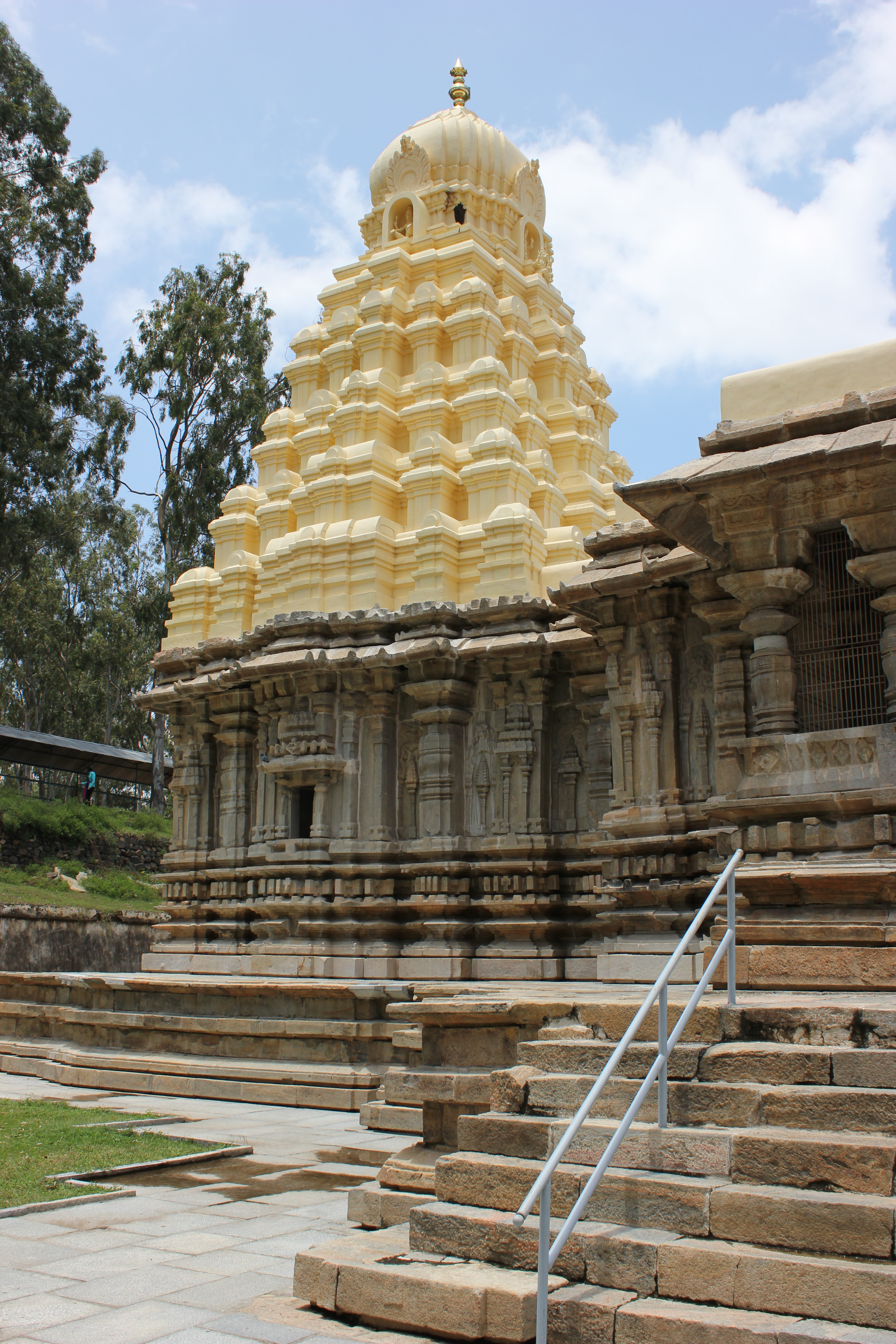
profile of the renovated Keertinarayana temple, Talakad

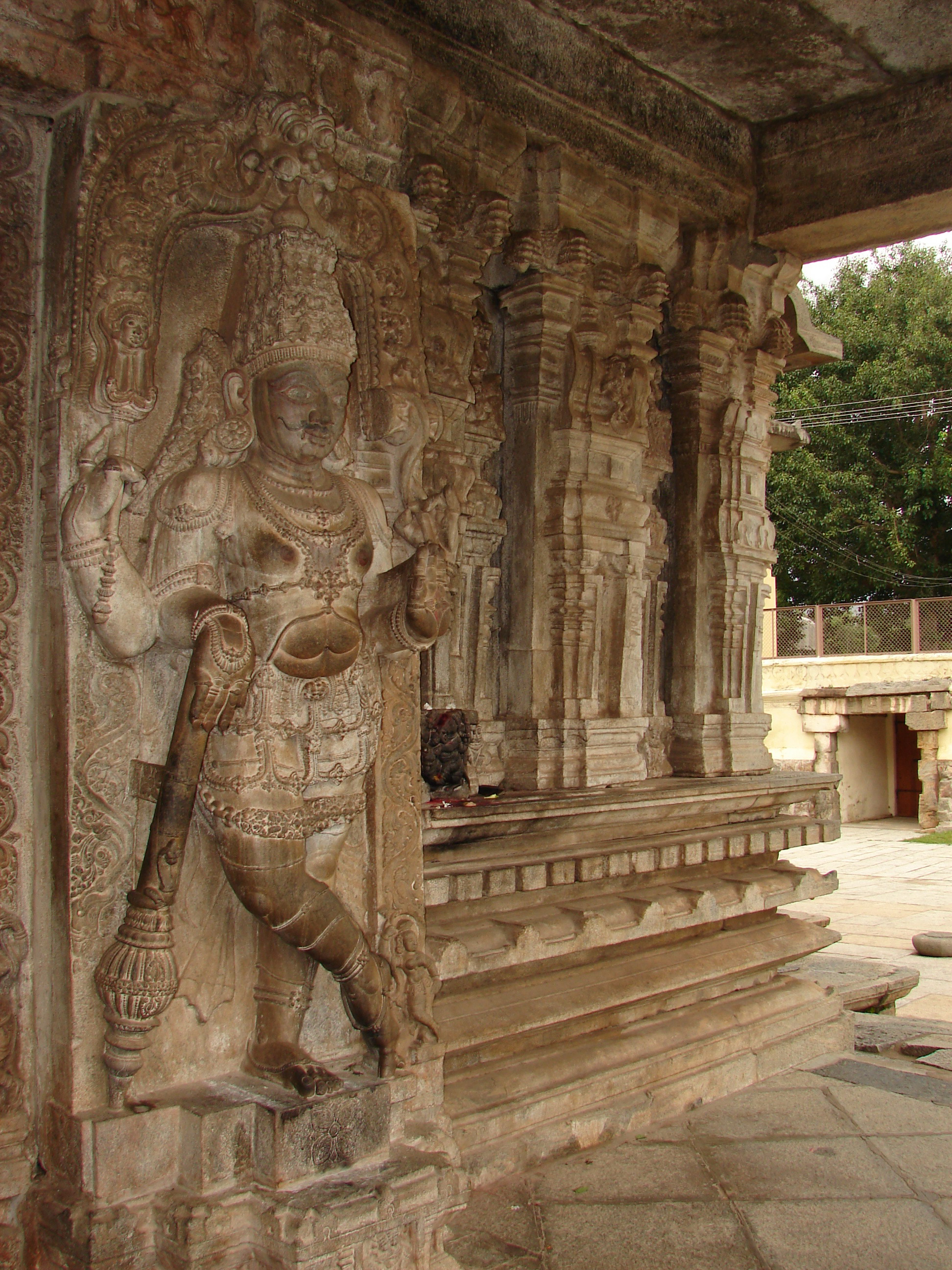
Dwarapalaka (door keeper) and a profile of the mantapa at the Vaidyeshvara temple, Talakad

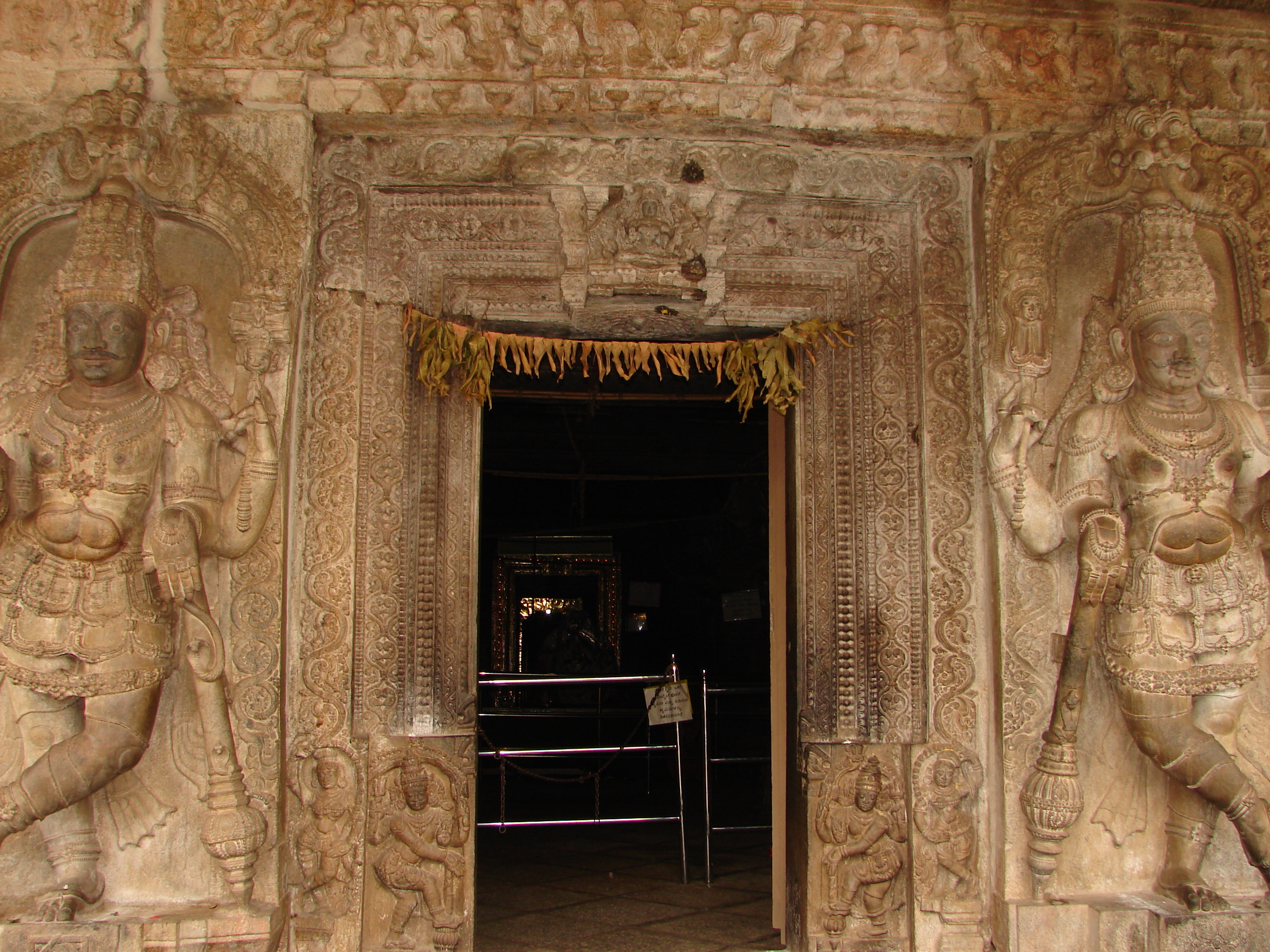
Ornate doorjamb at the Vaidyeshvara temple, Talakad

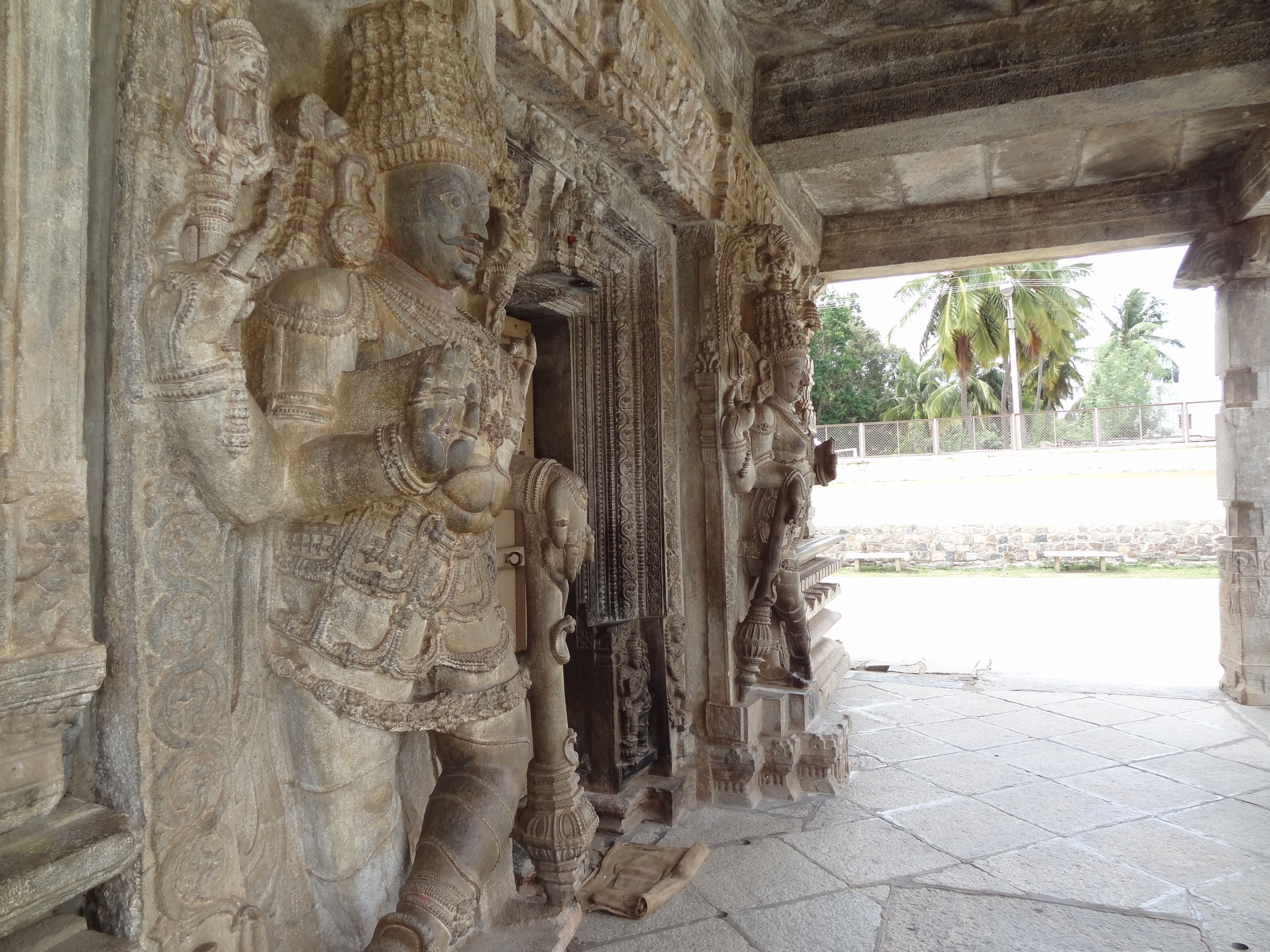
Profile of Dwarapalakas (door keepers) at the Vaidyeshvara temple, Talakad

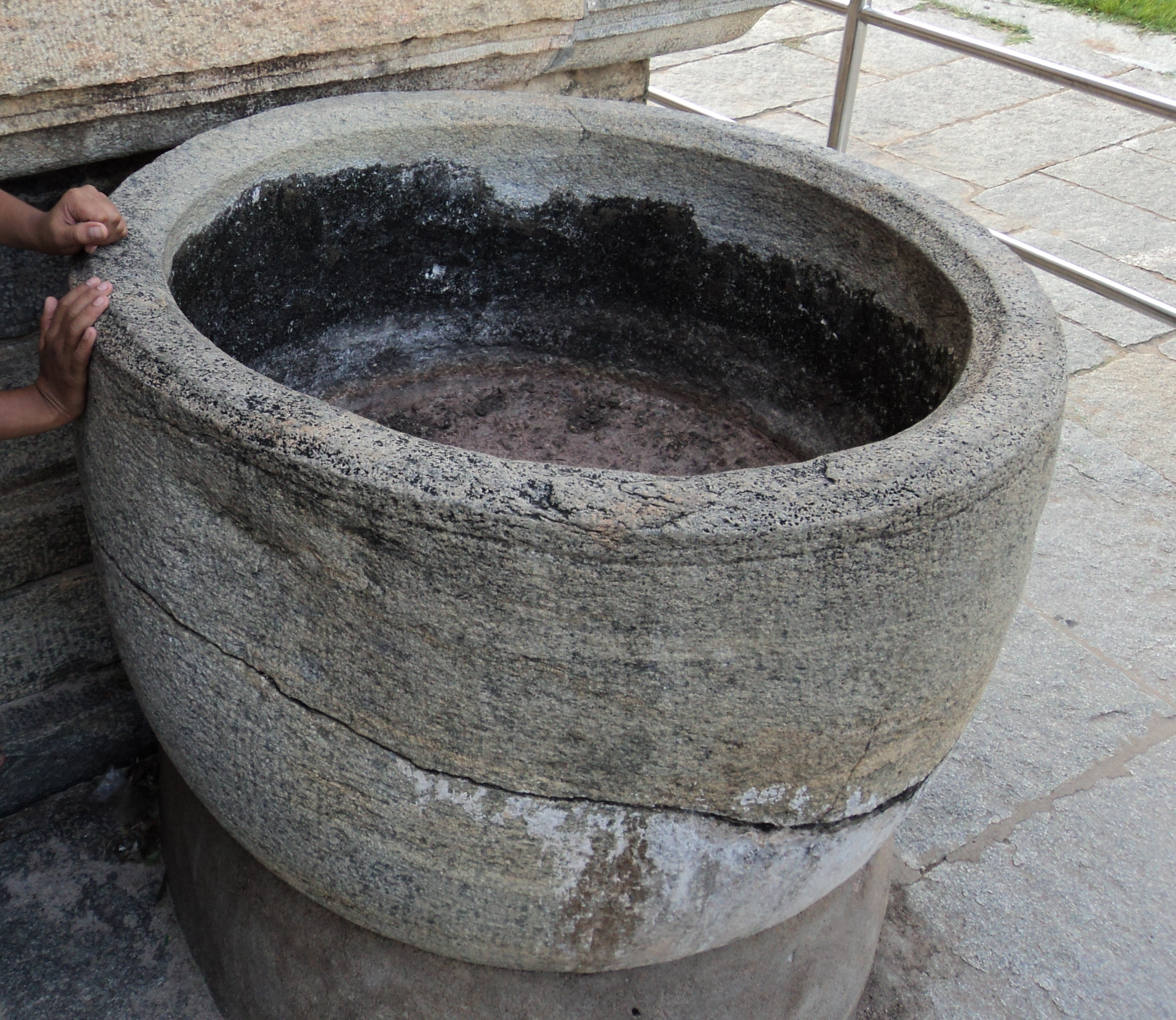
Stone vessel at the Vaidyeshvara temple, Talakad

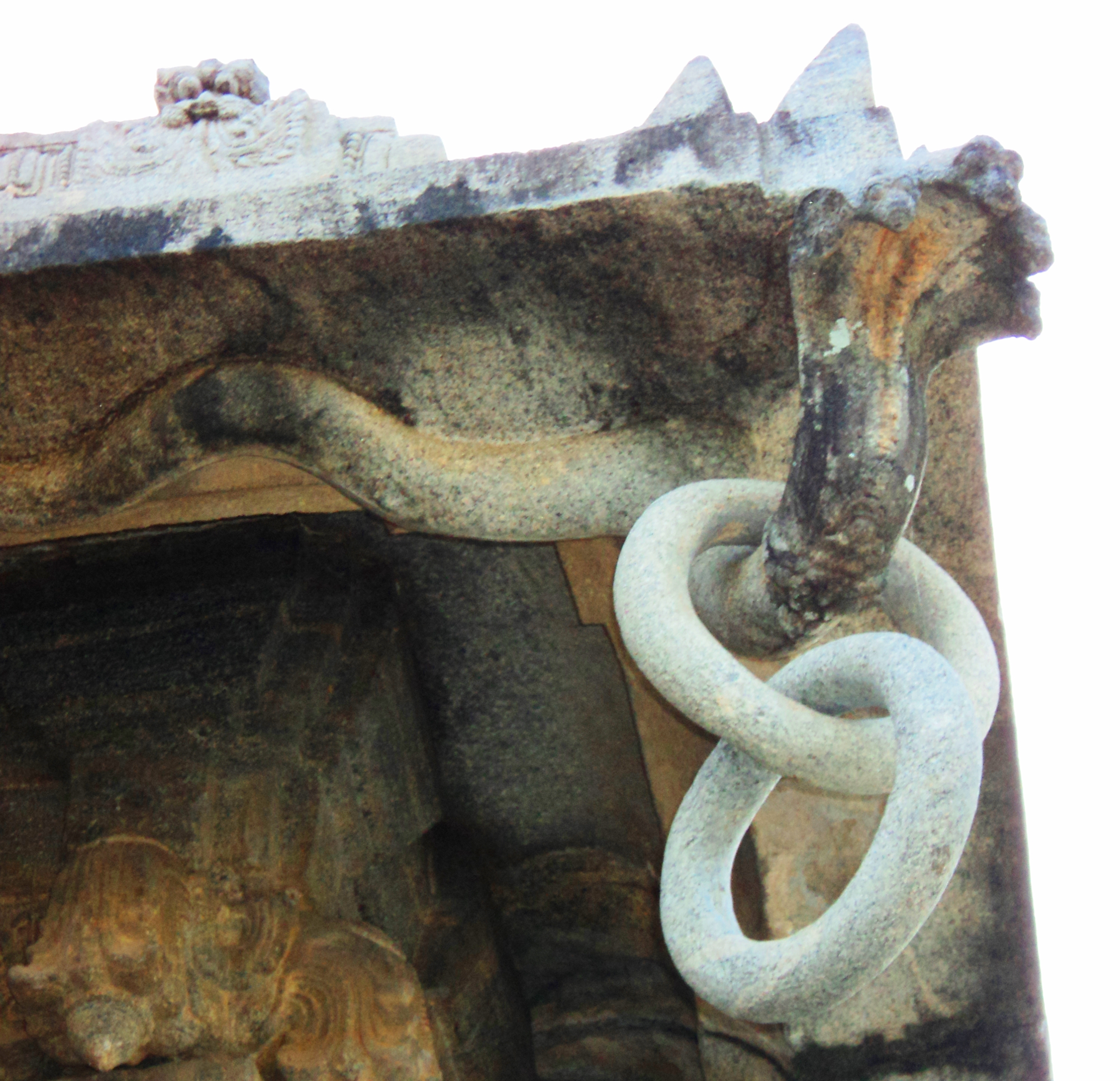
Five headed snake and monolithic stone chain at the Vaidyeshvara temple, Talakad

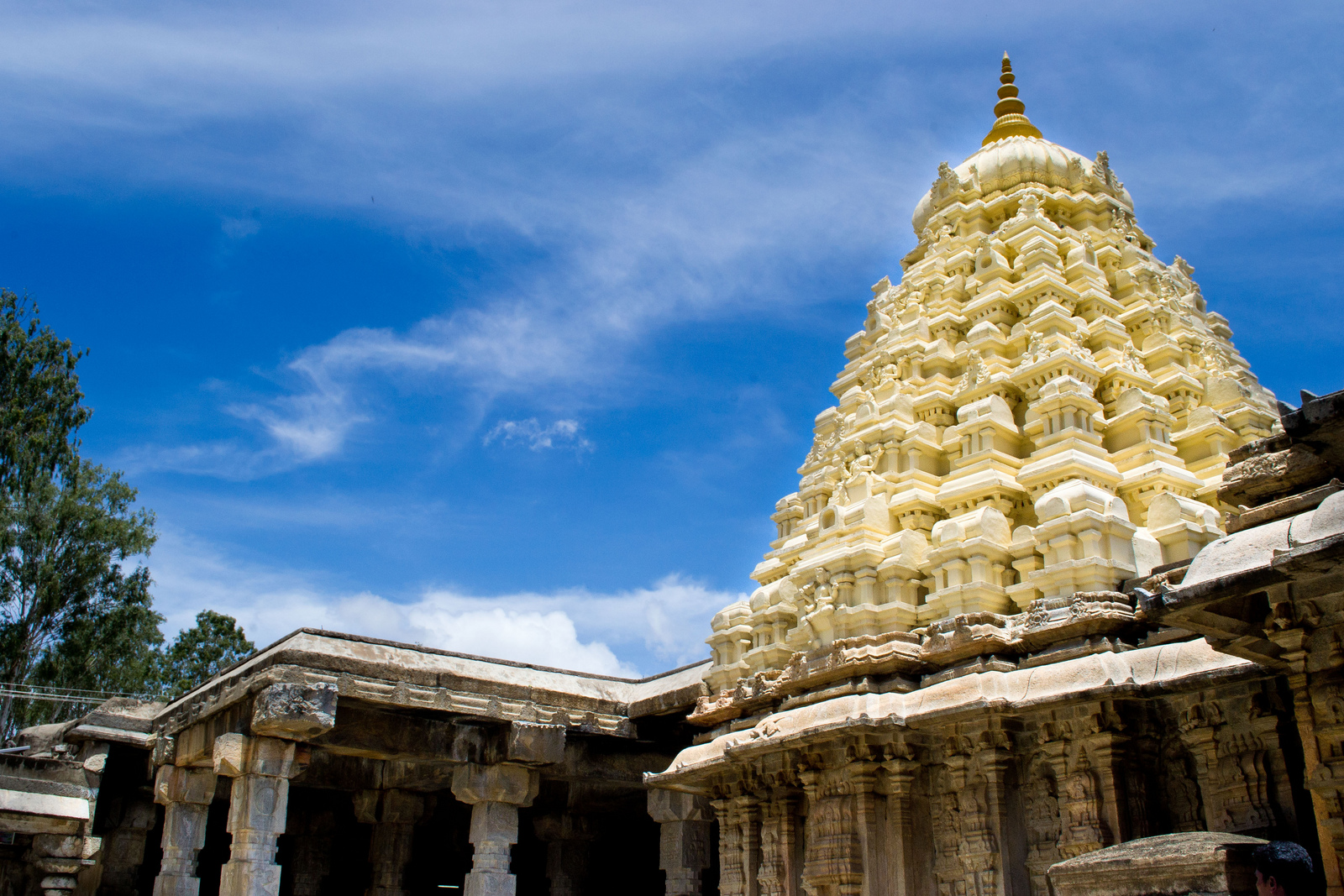
Close up view of Vesara shrine tower (vimana) made of stucco at the Vaidyeshvara temple, Talakad

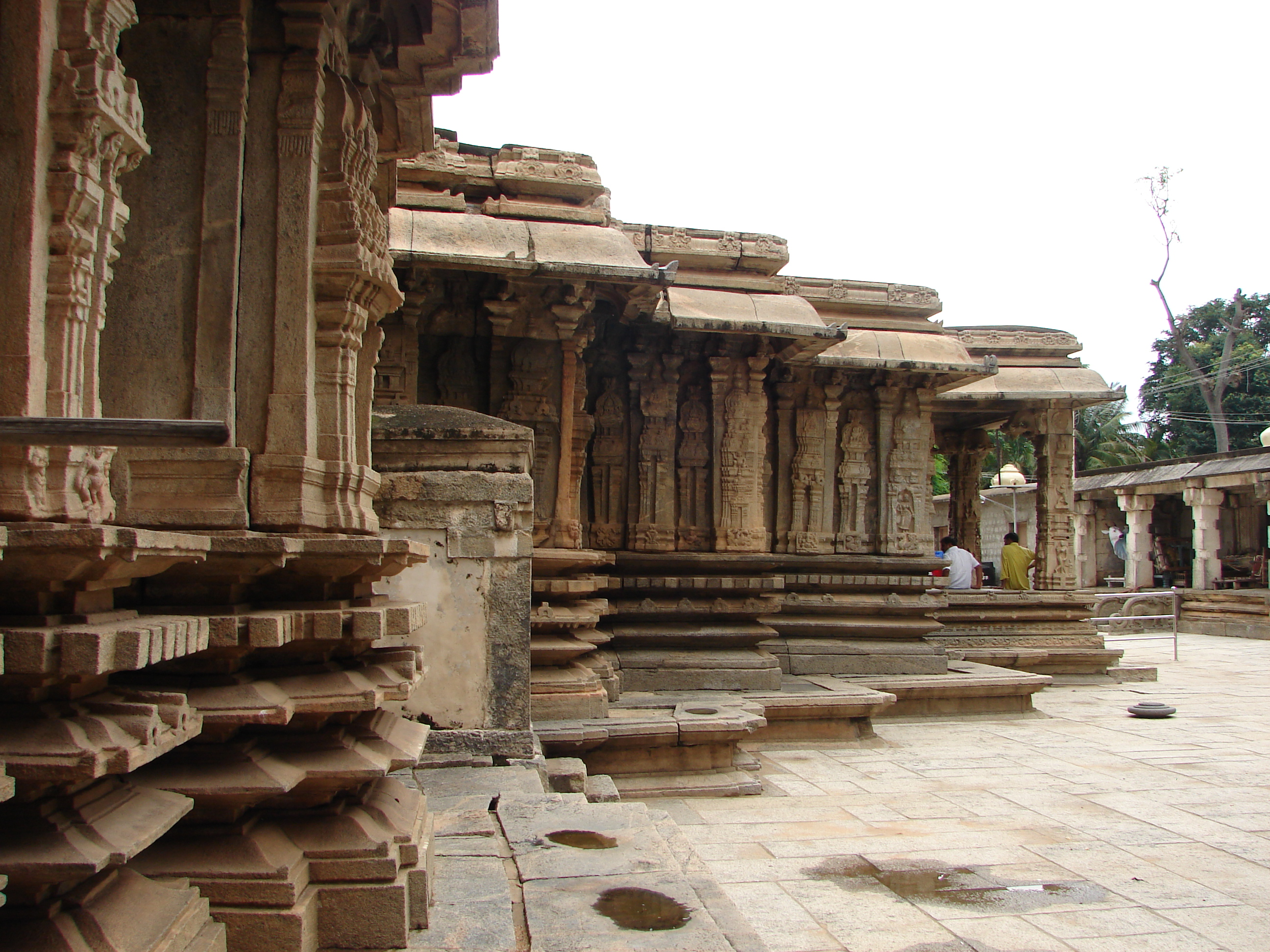
A profile of the outer wall of the mantapa at the Vaidyeshvara temple, Talakad

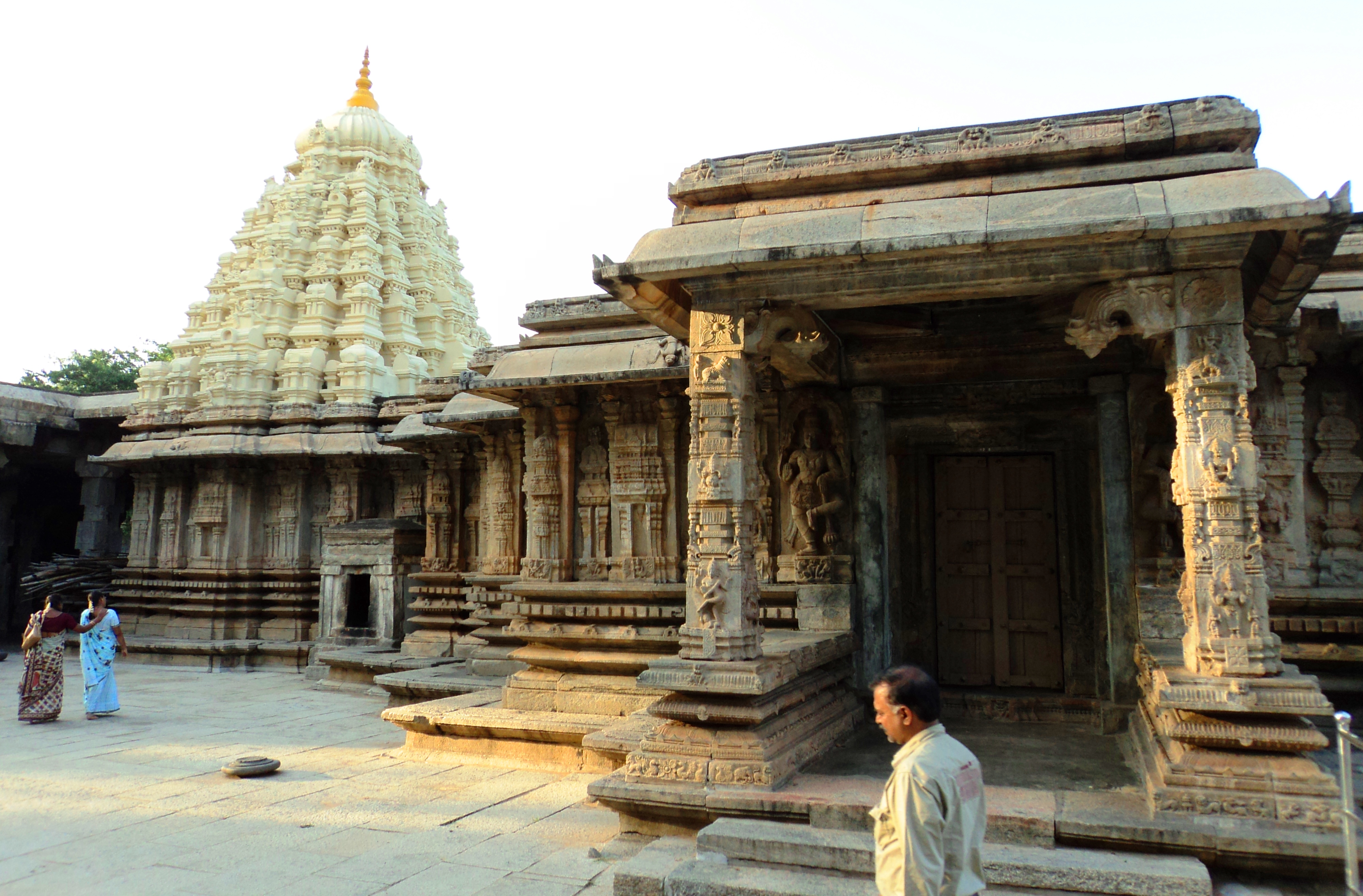
A view of the Vaidyeshvara temple, Talakad

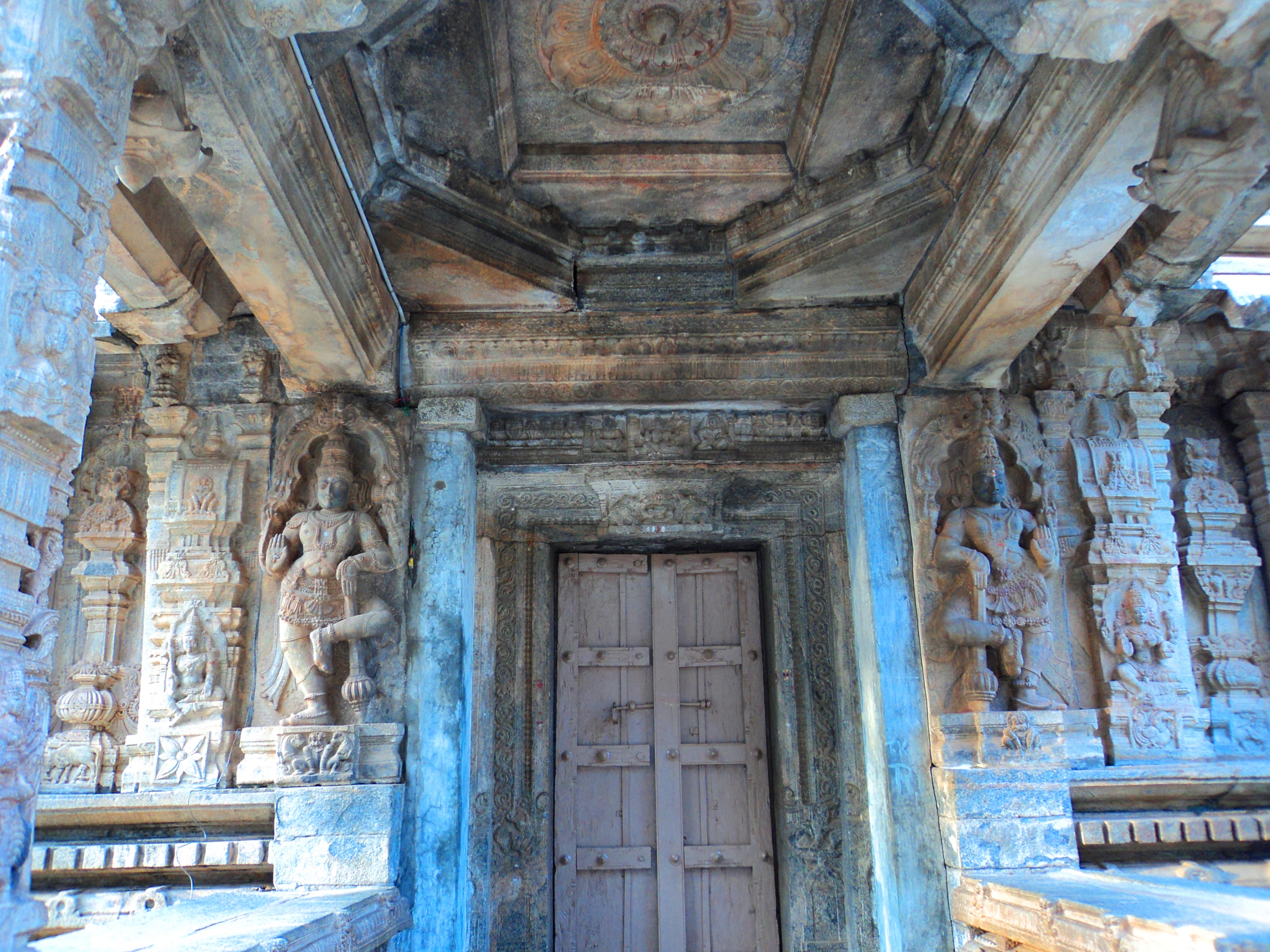
Ornate porch (south) entrance to Vaidyeshvara temple, Talakad

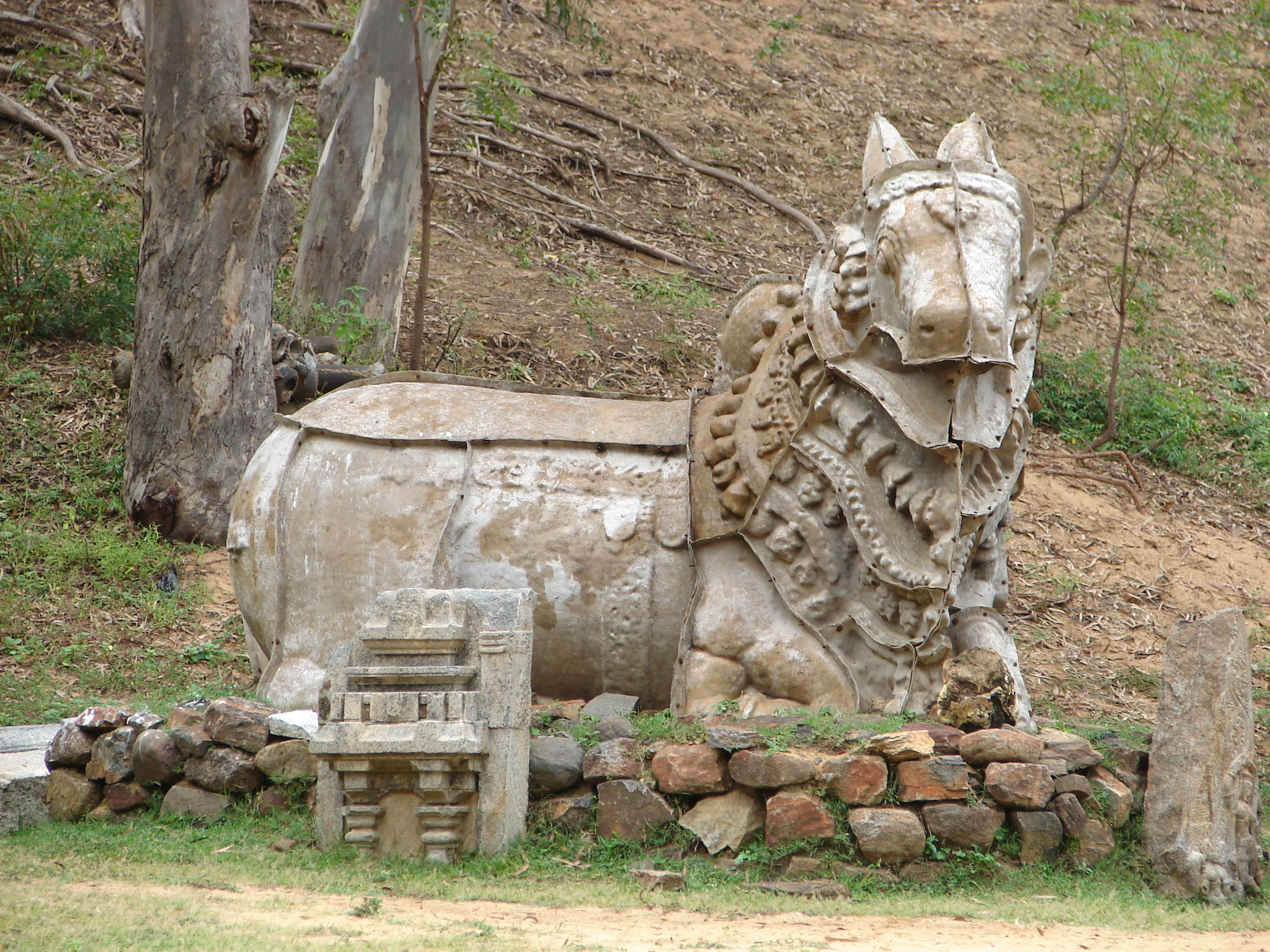
Nandi (bull) near the Kirtinarayana temple at Talakad
