= Mudukuthore =

Mudukuthore ( T Bettahalli) Thirumalakudu Bettahalli ( T Bettahalli)
- town
- Nickname: Thirumalakudu Bettahalli ( T Bettahalli)
- Interactive map of Mudukuthore ( T Bettahalli)
- Country: India
- State: Karnataka

Government
  - Type: Muzarai

Languages
  - Official: Kannada
- Time zone: UTC+5:30 (IST)
- Postal code: 571122

Mudukuthore (Thirumalakudu Bettahalli / T Bettahalli) is a pilgrim centre situated on the banks of the river Kaveri. The village is called T. Bettahalli, as per the government revenue documents, whereas Mudukuthore is a mythological name. T. Bettahalli is a quiet village with a backdrop of a hillock called Somagiri. T Bettahalli is located at a distance of 48 km from Mysore, 25 km from Somanathapura, 18 km from T.Narsipur, and is close to Talakad.

== History ==
The town gets its name "Mudukuthore" from the river Cauvery as it gets a turn and flows forward. Muduku means 'diversion' and thore means 'flow forward'.

The town is home to the Lord Mallikarjuna temple. In Hindu mythology, during Mahabharatha period, Arjuna, one of the Pandavas stayed at the hill where this temple is located and carved an idol of Shiva and did pooja with "Mallika pushpa" (a kind of flower), giving rise to the title 'Mallikarjuna' for Shiva.

Sri T Bettahalli Marikambha Temple popularly known as Bettahalli Maramma Temple is a six hundred-year-old temple site. In 2004, thieves demolished its central Idol, requiring the temple to later be rebuilt.
