= Mahisha kingdom =

Ancient Hindu kingdom of India

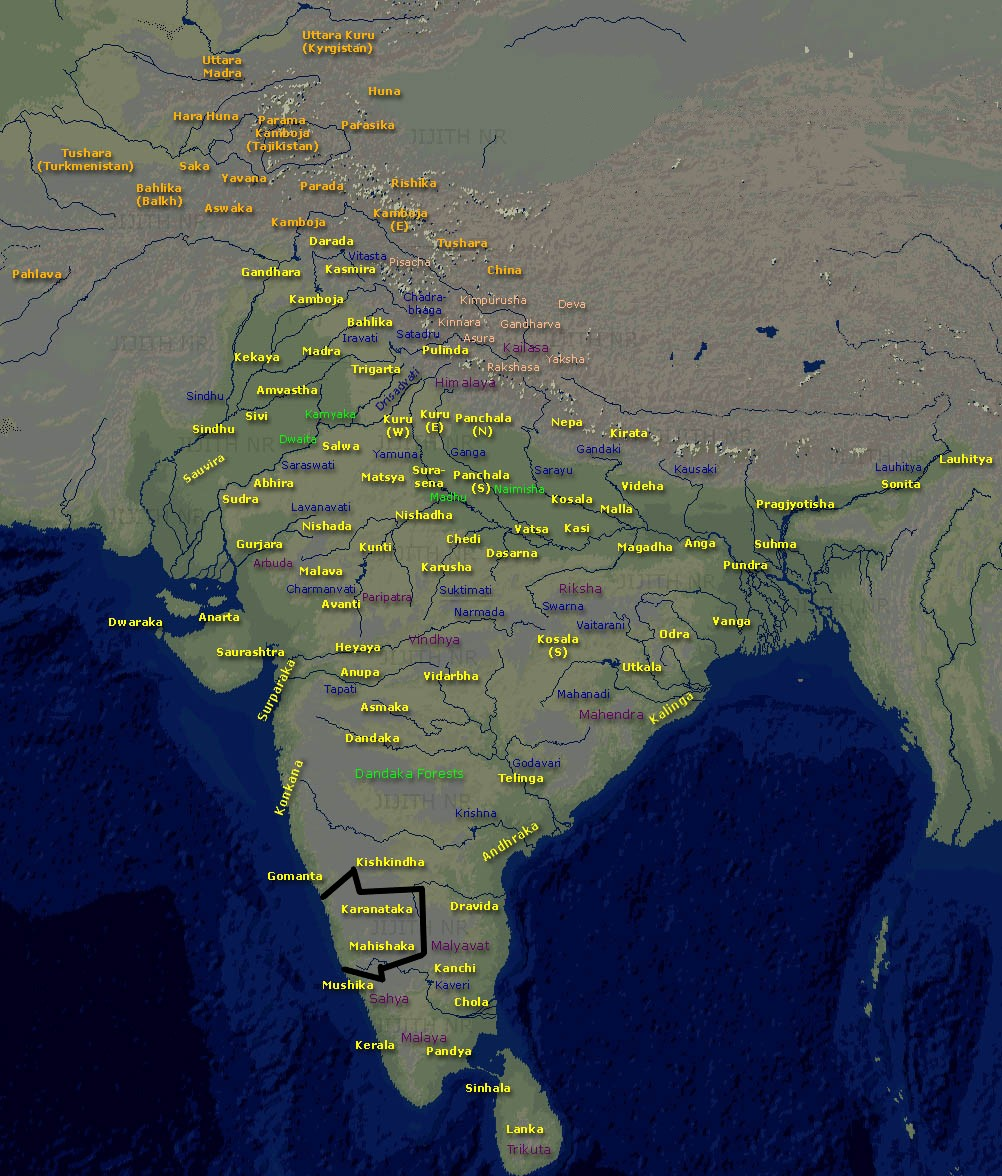
Mahishaka kingdom (black outline) shown in the south along with other kingdoms mentioned in Indian epic literature

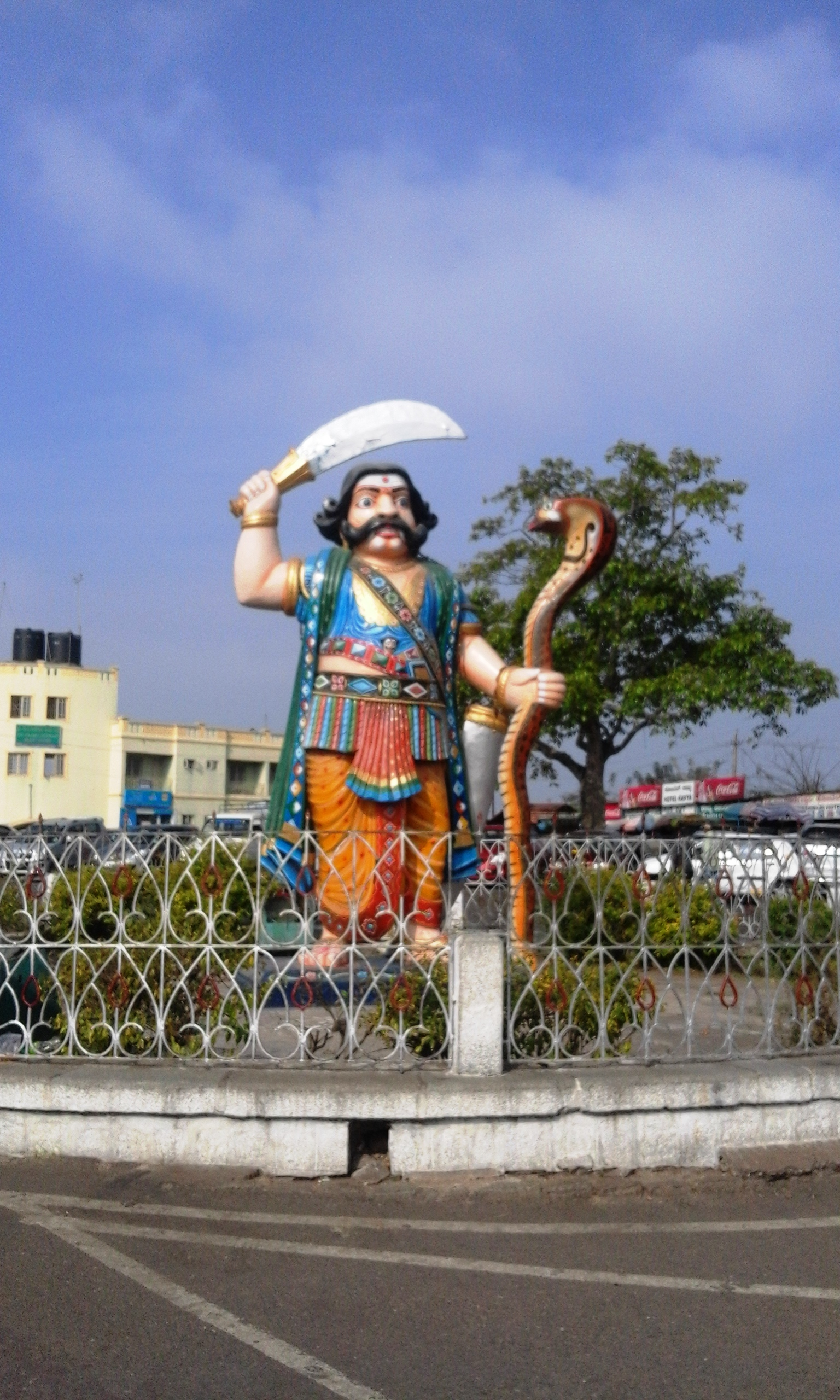
Mahisha at Chamundi Hills

Mahisha or Mahishaka was a kingdom in ancient India. The capital, Mahishuru, is currently known as Mysore, a city in Karnataka. This kingdom is mentioned in Mahabharata, but Puranas (especially Markandeya Purana) give more information. The name Mahisha (Sanskrit: महिष) means great, powerful.

== History ==
King Mahisha built a vast kingdom with Mahishuru at its center, which was the Mahisha kingdom. The name of "Mysore", came from its ruler Mahisha.

=== In the Mahabharata ===
Bhisma Parva, Mahabharata, Book VI, Chapter 10 describes geography and provinces of ancient India. Mahisha is mentioned in Mahabharata- "There are other kingdoms in the south. They are the Dravidas, the Keralas, the Prachyas, the Mushikas, and the Vanavashikas; the Mahishakas, the Vikalpas, the Mushakas ..."

Karna Parva, Mahabharata Book VIII, Chapter 30 mentions the people who are not righious: "The Karasakaras, the Mahishakas, the Kalingas, the Kikatas, the Atavis, the Karkotakas, the Virakas, and other peoples of no religion, one should always avoid."

==== Yudhishthira's Rajasuya sacrifice ====
Yudhishthira, the Kuru king, performed a Rajasuya sacrifice in order to again imperial sovereignty. All his brothers went on extensive military campaigns to extract tribute from all the kingdoms and subjugate those who refused to do so.

"A battle took place between Arjuna and the Dravidas and Andhras and the fierce Mahishakas and the hillmen of Kolwa. Subjugating those tribes without having to accomplish any fierce feats, Arjuna proceeded to the country of the Surashtras, his footsteps guided by the horse." (14,83)

== See also ==
- Kingdoms of Ancient India
- Mushika Kingdom

== Sources ==
- Journal of Indian History. University of Kerala. 1949-01-01.
- Mahabharata of Krishna Dwaipayana Vyasa, translated to English by Kisari Mohan Ganguli
- Datta, Manmathanatha (1897-01-01). A Prose English Translation of the Mahabharata: (tr. Literally from the Original Sanskrit Text). H.C. Dass.
- Umashankar, H. D. (October 8, 2019). "Mahisha Dusshera – Rediscovering of the forgotten history". Gauri Lankesh news. Gauri Lankesh news.
- "Mysuru name". mysore.org.uk.
