= Talakadu =

Talakadu Talakad, Talkad
- Town
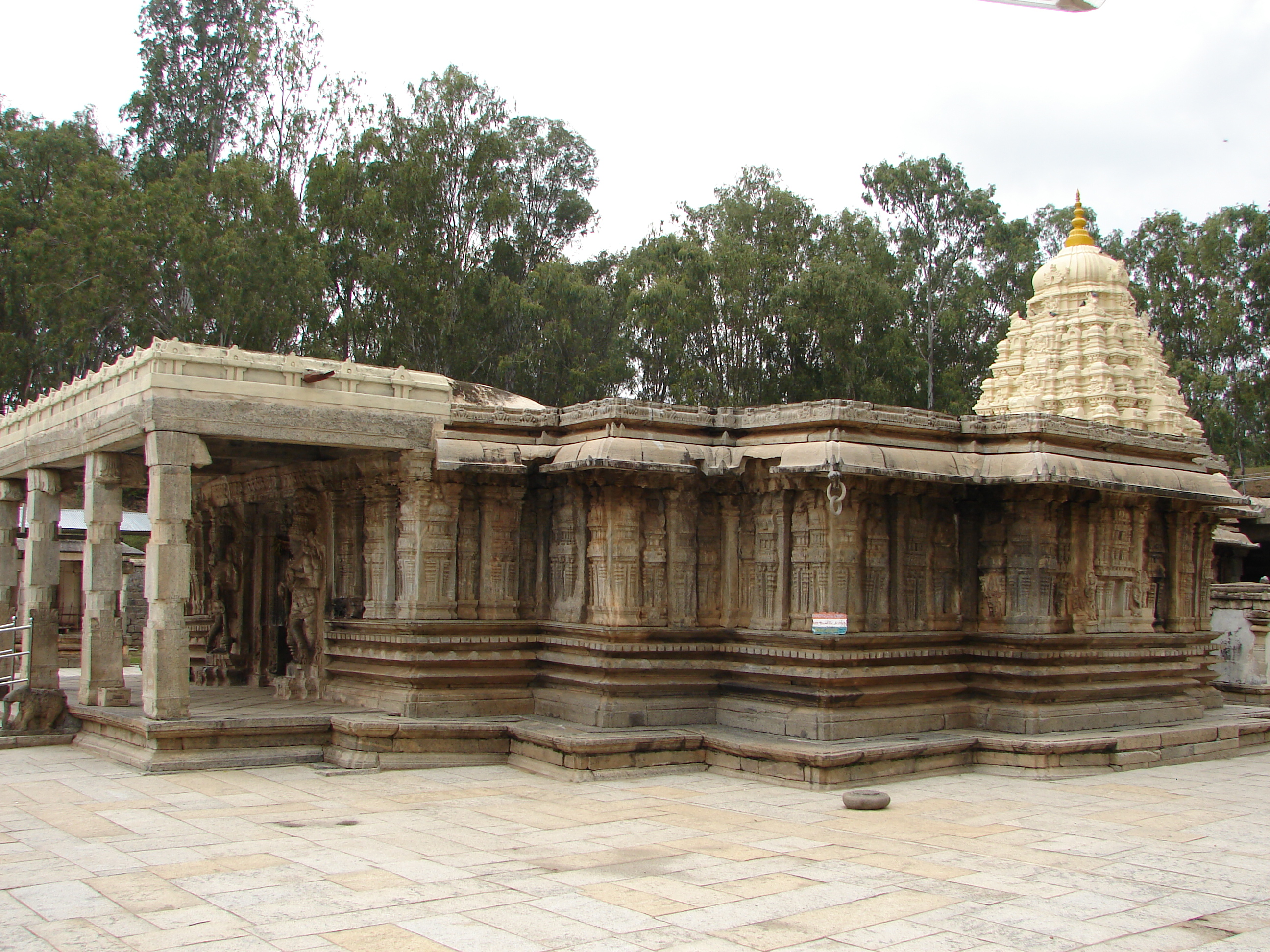
- Vaidyeshvara temple, Talakadu

- Location in Karnataka, India Talakadu (India)
- Coordinates: 12.22°N 77.03°E
- Country: India
- State: Karnataka
- District: Mysore district
- Elevation: 700 m (2,300 ft)

Population (2011)
  - Total: 8,539

Languages
  - Official: Kannada
- Time zone: UTC+5:30 (IST)

Talakādu is a town on the left bank of the Kaveri river 45 km (28 miles) from Mysore and 133 km (82 miles) from Bangalore in Karnataka, India. Latinizations of the towns name vary, but include Talkād, Talakadu, Talakkadu, or Thalakadu. It had over 30 temples, most of which now lay buried in sand. The extant group of temples, where the eastward flowing Kāveri river changes course as the sand on its banks spreads over a wide area, is a popular pilgrimage site for Hindus.

== History ==
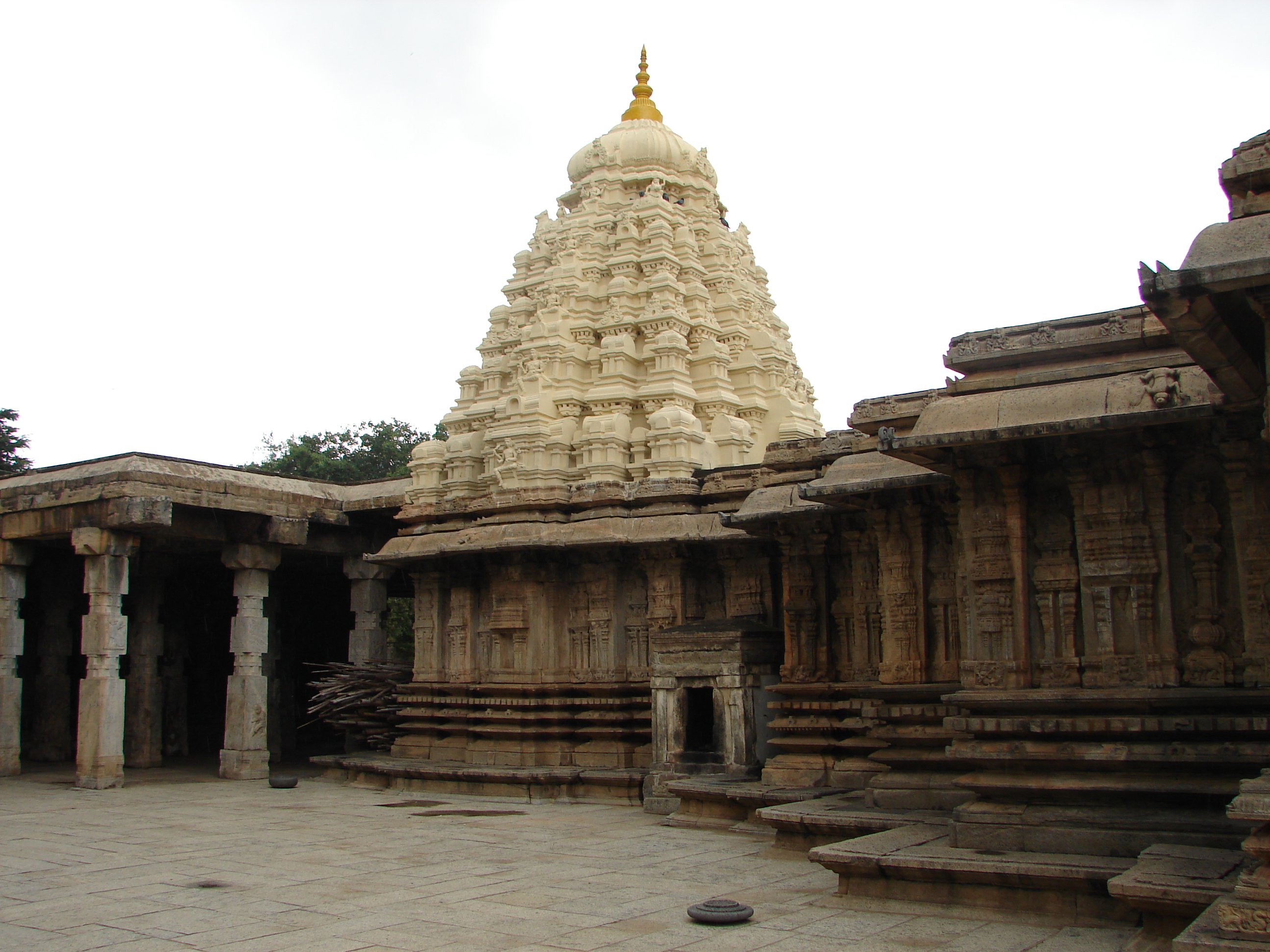
Close up view of the shrine and mantapa (hall) outer wall at Vaidyeshvara temple

The origin of the town is lost in antiquity, but one tradition is that its name was derived from two Kirāta twin brothers, Tala and Kādu. The brothers cut down a tree after seeing wild elephants worship it and discovered it contained an image of Shiva and that the elephants were rishis transformed. The tree being miraculously restored, all obtained mōksha and the place was named Tala-kādu, which was translated into Sanskrit as Dala-vana. Two stone images declared to represent the brothers are pointed out in front of the temple Veerabadra swamy. In a later age, Rāma is said to have halted here on his expedition to Lanka.

The earliest authentic mention of the city of Talekād or Talakādu, in Sanskrit Dalavana-pura, is in connection with the Ganga line of kings. Harivarma, who has been assigned to find a place (247–266 CE) was, according to an old chronicle, installed at Skandapura (said to be Gajalhatti, in the Coimbatore country, near where the Moyār flows into the Bhavāni), but resided in the great city of Dalavanapura in the Karnāta-dēsa. After Talkād became the capital these powerful sovereigns and there the subsequent kings of that line were crowned.

At the beginning of the eleventh century CE, the Western Gangas succumbed to the Chōlas, who captured Talkād and gave it the name of Rājarājapura. But about a century later the Hoysala king Vishnuvardhana, who drove the Chōlas out of Mysore, took it. After this time, Talkād was composed of seven towns and five mathas. The town of Māyilangi or Malingi, on the opposite side of the river, was also a large place and had the name of Jananāthapura. Until the mid-fourteenth century, it remained a possession of the Hoysalas and then passed into the hands of a feudatory of the Vijayanagar sovereigns, whose line appears to be known as that of Sōma-Rāja.

=== Curse of Talakadu ===
In 1610 CE, the Mysore Rāja conquered Talakadu under the following circumstances. Tirumala-Rāja—sometimes called Srī Ranga Rāya—the representative of the Vijayanagar family at Srirangapatna, being afflicted with an incurable disease, came to Talkād for the purpose of offering sacrifices in the temple of Vaidyēsvara. His second wife Rāni Alamelamma was left in charge of the government of Srirangagapattanam, but she—hearing he was on the point of death—soon after left for Talkād with the object of seeing him before he died, handing over Srirangapattanam and its dependencies to Rāja Wodeyar of Mysore, whose dynasty ever since retained them. It appears that Rāja Wodeyar had been desirous of possessing the jewels which was the property of the Rāni, and being unable to obtain them and eager to seize at any pretext, he levied an army and proceeded against the Rani. Rāni Alamelamma went to the banks of the Cauvery, and throwing in the jewel, drowned herself opposite Mālangi, at the same time uttering a three-fold curse: "Let Talakād become sand; let Mālangi become a whirlpool; let the Mysore Rājas fail to beget heirs." The latter part continues to affect the royal family.

Talakadu is also tagged to the curse called "Curse of Talakadu" by Alamelamma on the Wodeyar dynasty (former Maharajas) of Mysore.

The following is what is known as the curse of Talkād, in the original:

Talkādu Maralaāgi,
Mālingi maduvaāgi,
Mysuru dhorege makkalagade hōgali!
(ತಲಕಾಡು ಮರಳಾಗಿ; ಮಾಲಿಂಗಿ ಮಡುವಾಗಿ, ಮೈಸೂರು ದೊರೆಗೆ ಮಕ್ಕಳಾಗದೆ ಹೋಗಲಿ!)

The curse may be translated into English by:

May Talakadu become desert land,

Malangi become a whirlpool,

And Mysore Kings bear no heirs!

The old city Talkād is completely buried beneath the sand stretching for nearly a mile in length, only the tops of two gopuras being visible. The sand hills used to advance upon the town at the rate of 9 or 10 feet a year, principally during the south-west monsoon and as they pressed it close on three sides. The inhabitants of Talkād were constantly forced to abandon their houses and retreat further inland. The town, however, is increasing in population, owing to the rich wet cultivation in the neighbourhood, derived from the Mādhavamantri anicut and channel. More than thirty temples are beneath the sand, but the Kírti Nārāyana temple has been successfully excavated. The most imposing temple left uncovered by the sand is that of Vydyanatheshwara temple. In the early nineteenth century, two temples—Ānandēsvara and Gaurisankara—were unearthed. Four fragmentary records were found on the outer walls of the Pātālēsvara temple. One of these is an old inscription in Kannada of the Ganga period, the others being in Tamil. The Ānandēsvara temple is said to have been built by one Chidānandasvāmi, a contemporary of Haidar. A story is related to that of the Svāmi that he once crossed the Cauvery in full flood seated on a plantain leaf and that Haidar who witnessed the miracle greatly honoured him and made a grant of land for the temple founded by him. A Kannada inscription at the Gaurisankara temple tells us that this temple was built during the reign of the Mysore king Chikka-Dēva-Rāja-Wodeyar (1672–1704). The Hoysala ruler, Vishnuvardhana, conquered the Gangas and Talakadu. He built the Vijayanarayana Chennakesava Temple at Belur.

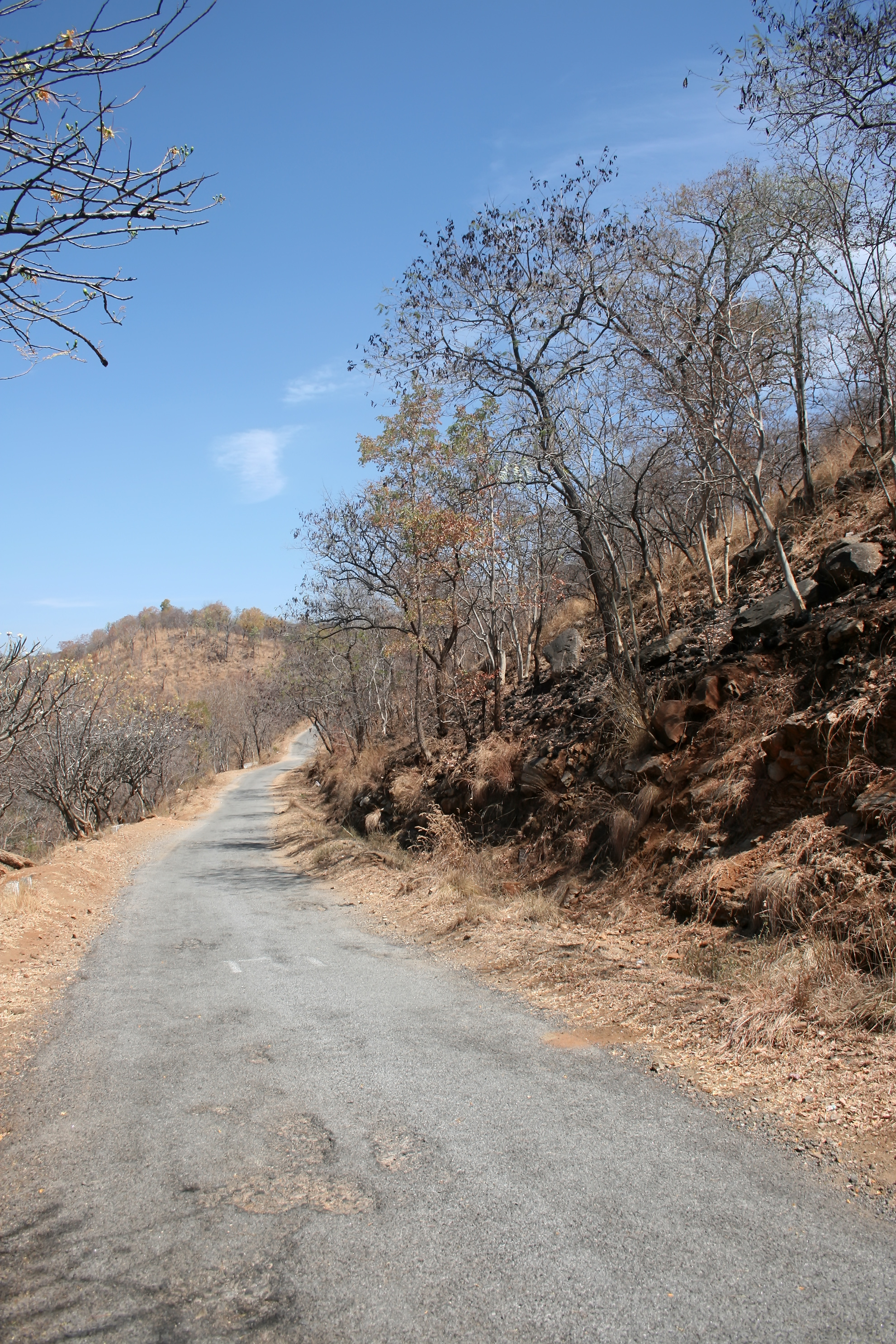
A view of Talkad

== Gallery ==
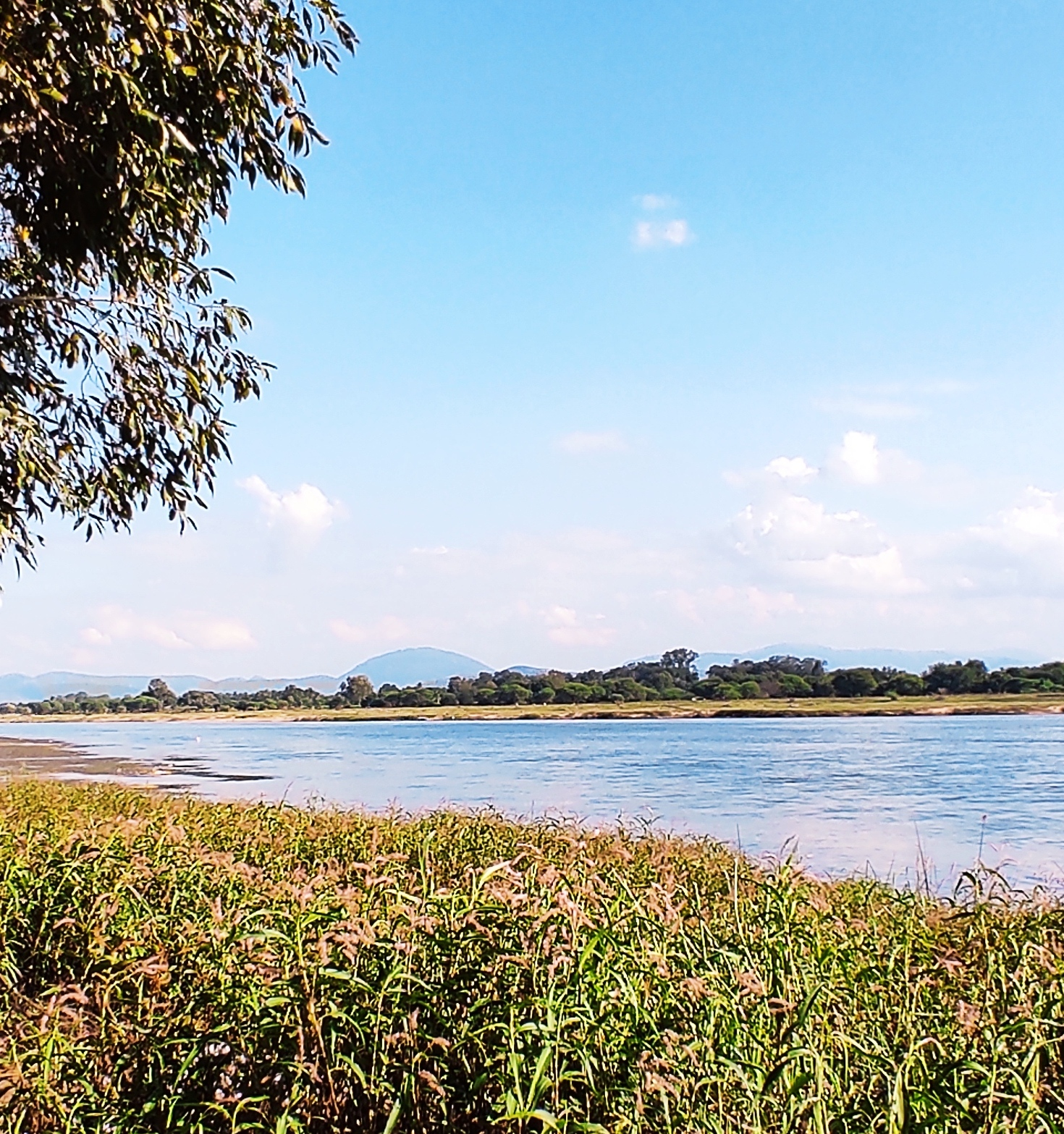
The Kaveri flows in Talakadu

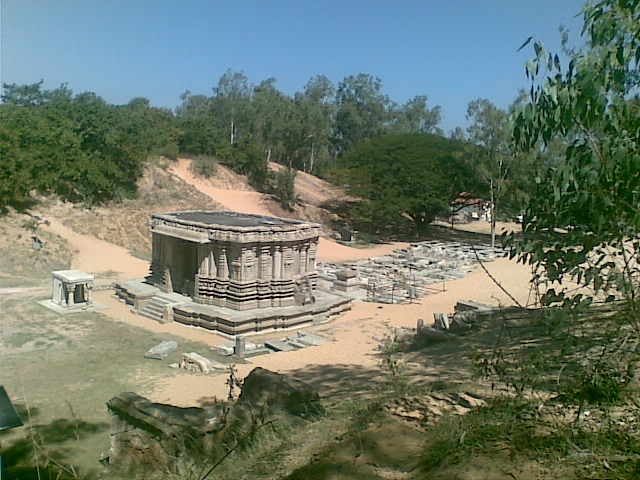
Mahadwara (great entrance) of Kirtinarayana temple, recovered from the sand dunes at Talakadu

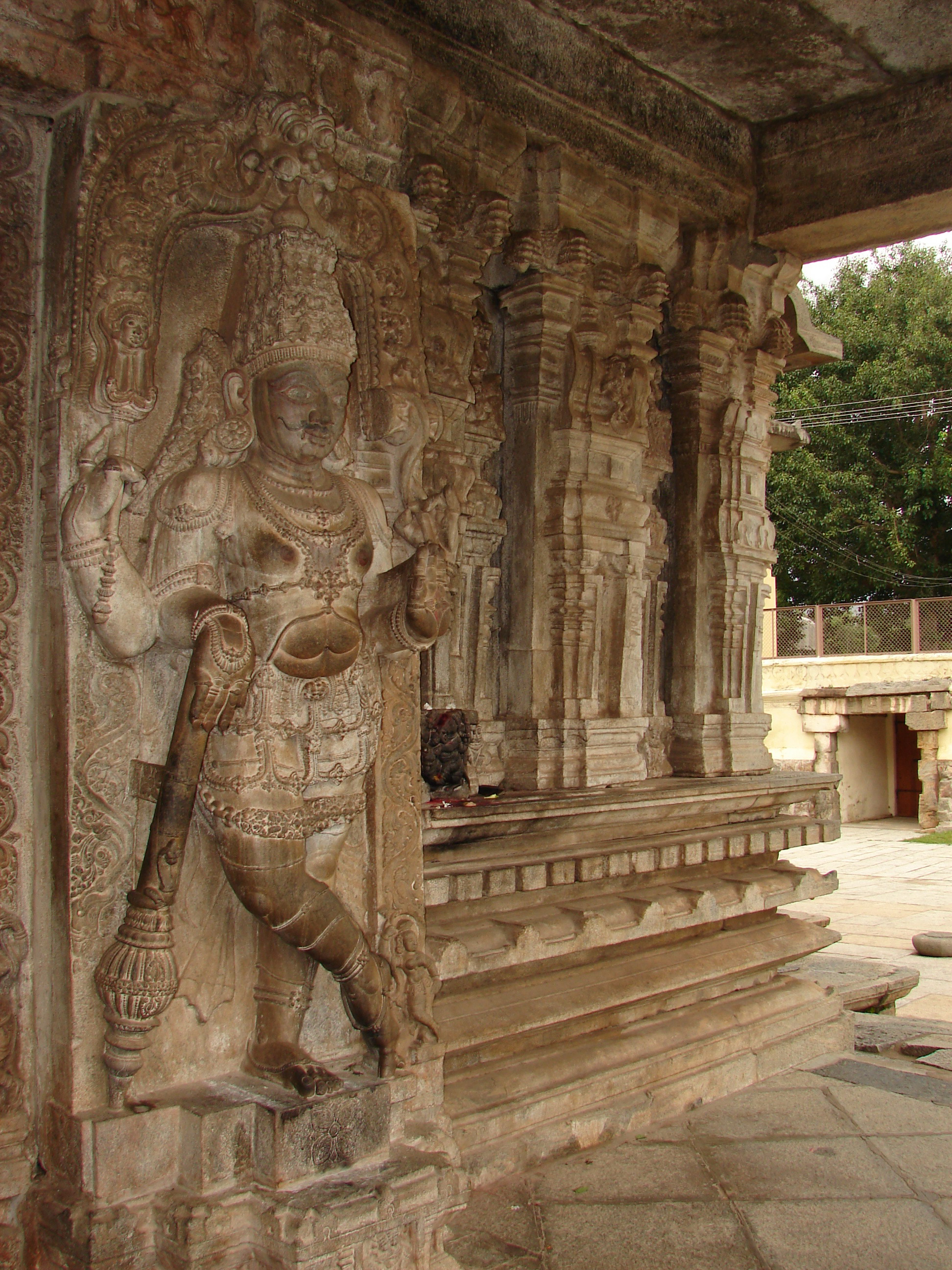
Dwarapalaka (door keeper) and a profile of the mantapa at Vaidyeshvara temple

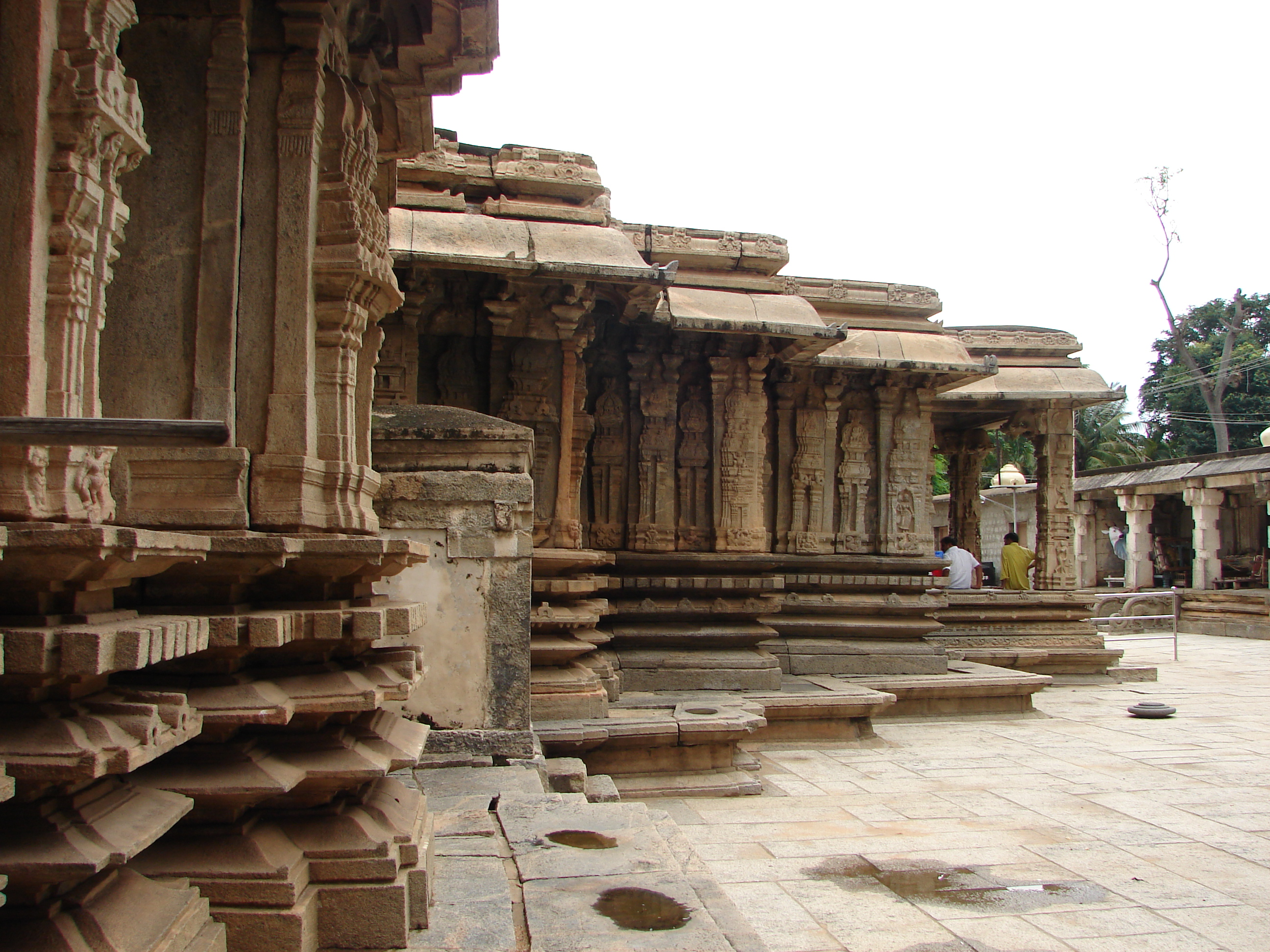
A profile of the outer wall of the mantapa in Vaidyeshvara temple

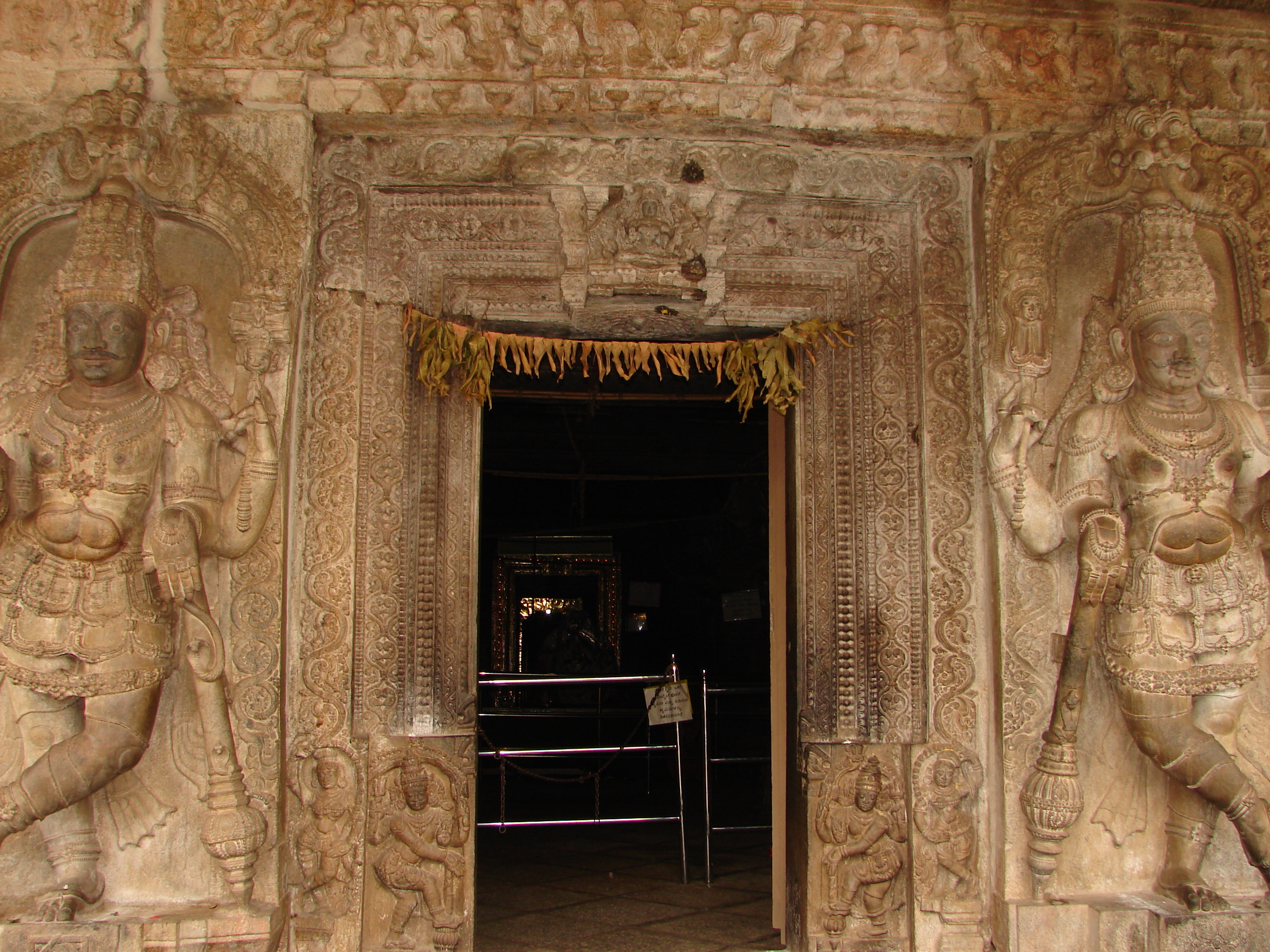
Ornate doorjamb and Dwarapalakas in relief in Vaidyeshvara temple

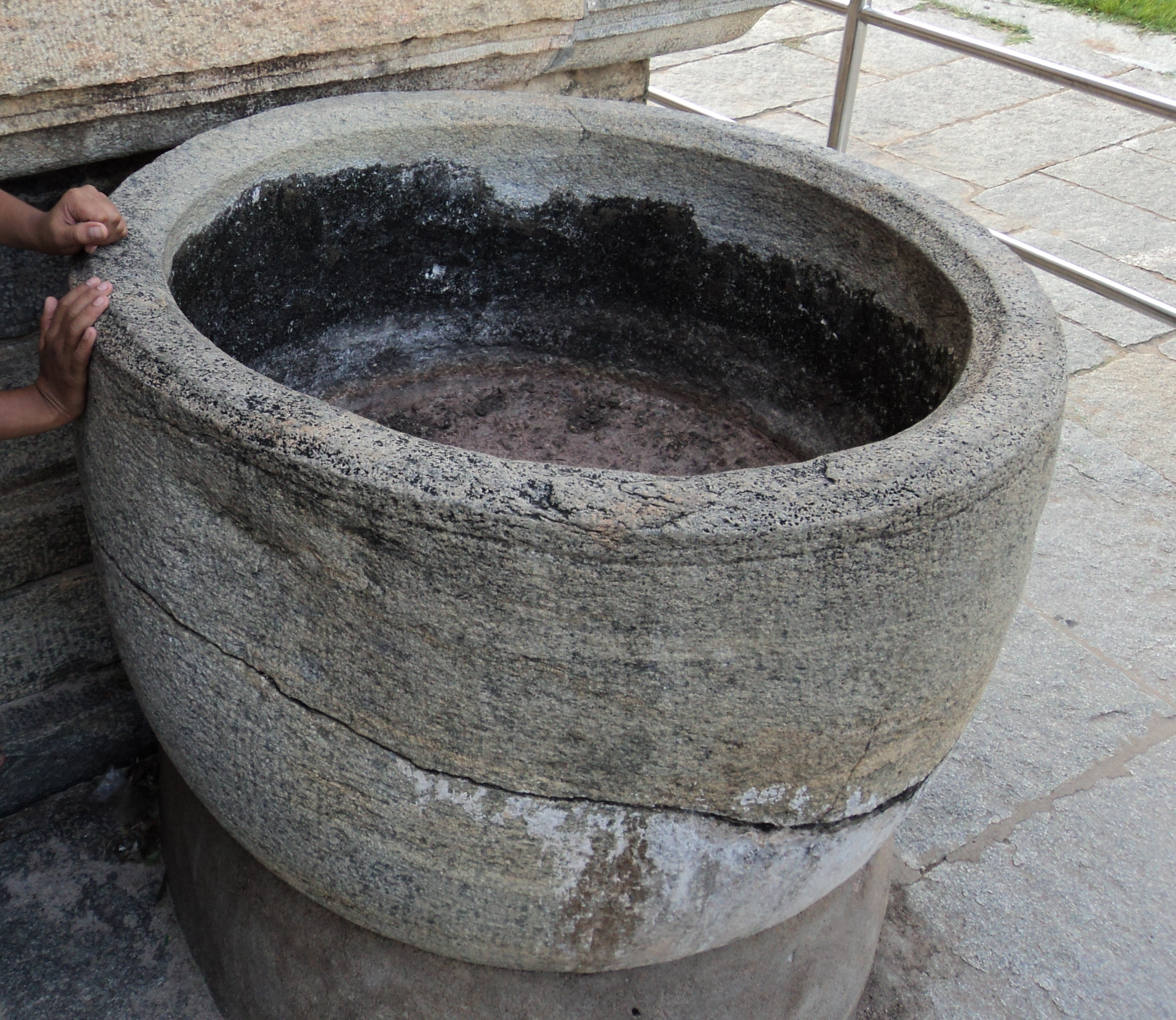
Stone vessel at Vaidyeshwara temple, Talakadu

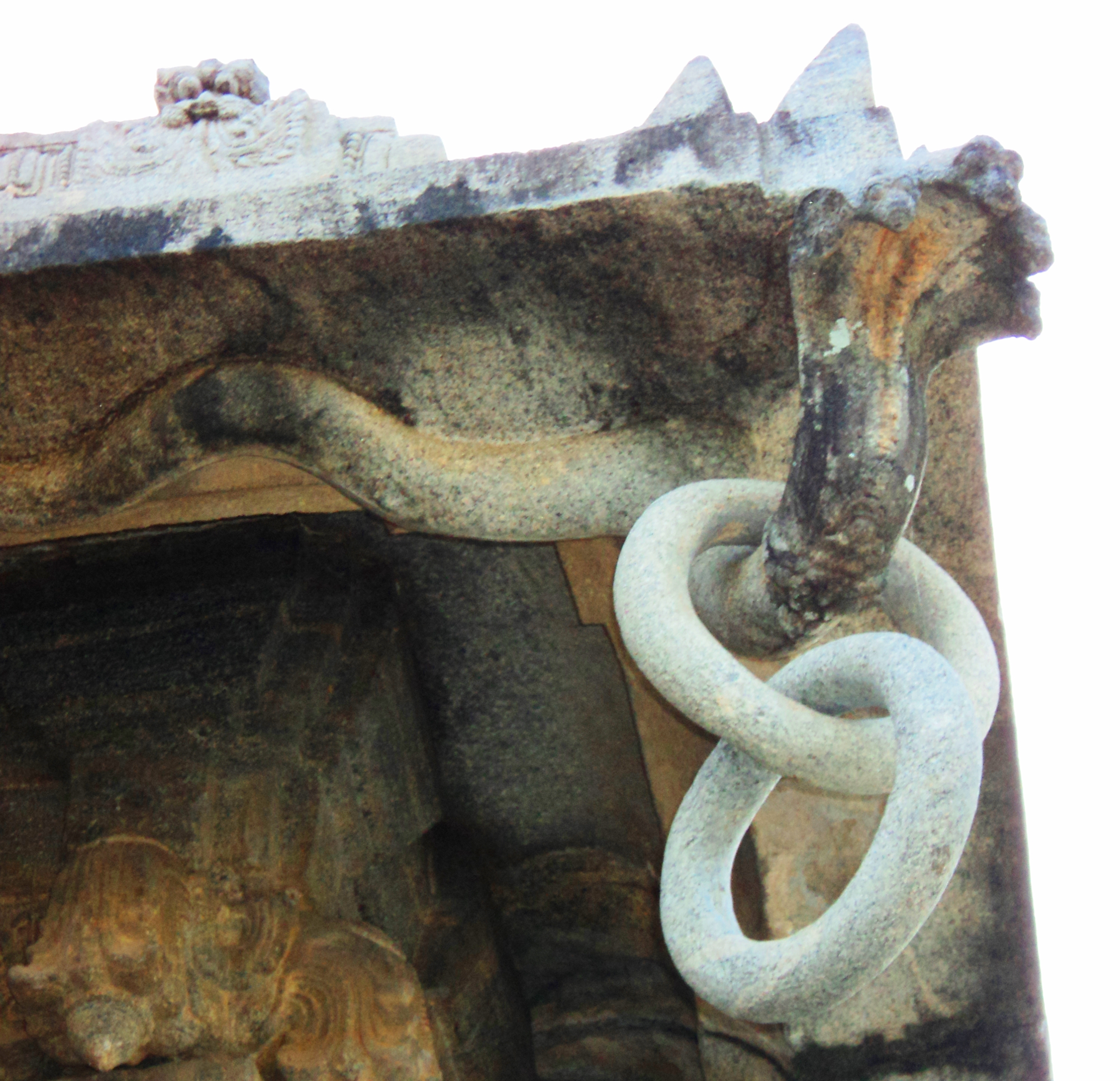
Five headed snake and stone chain

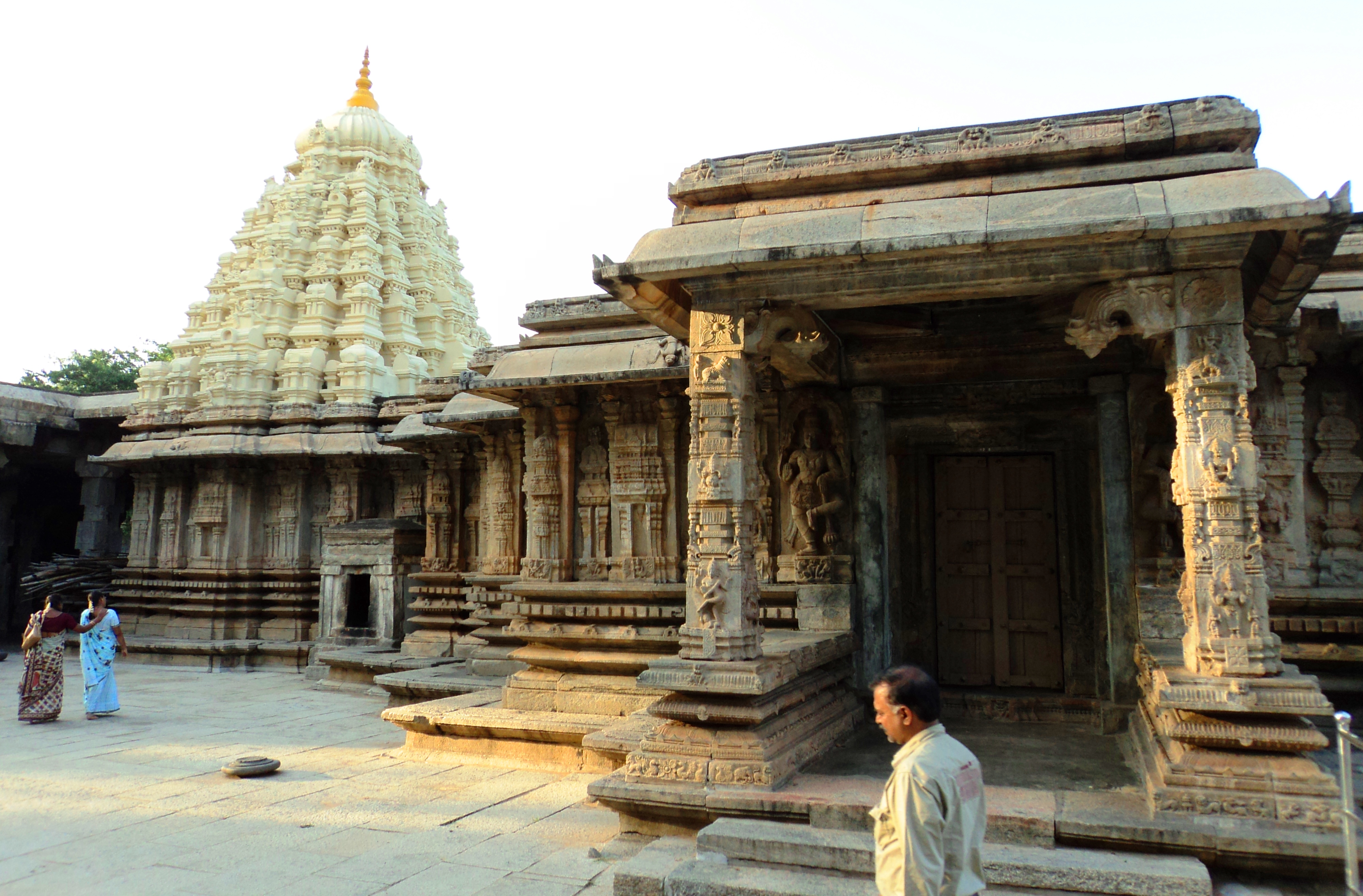
A view of Vaidyeshwara temple, Talakadu

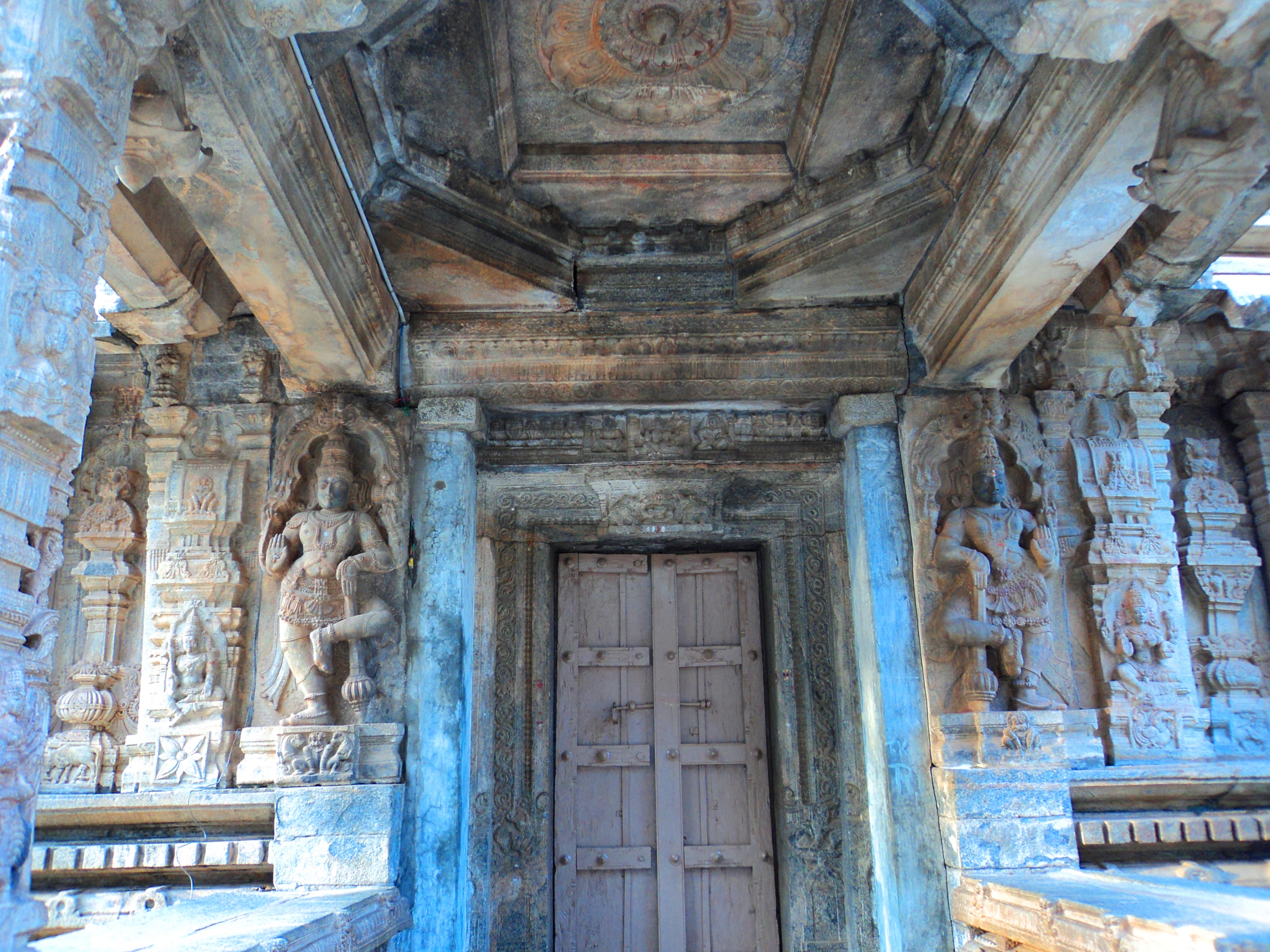
South entrance porch to Vaidyeshwara Temple

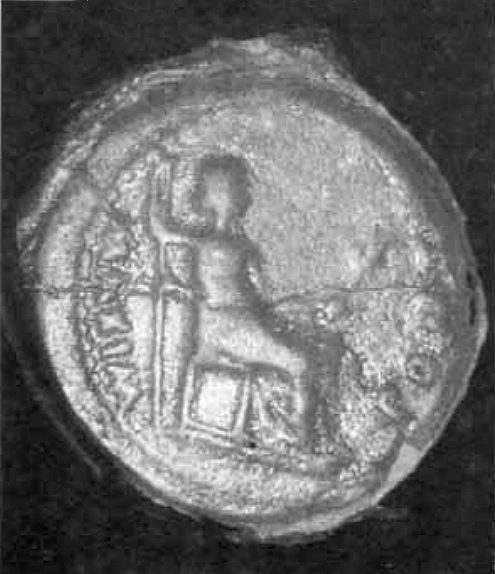
Roman coin mold found in Talkad
