= Avarolli =

- Village
- Location in Karnataka, India Avarolli (India)
- Coordinates: 15.651139°N 74.616394°E
- Country: India
- State: Karnataka
- District: Belgaum
- Talukas: Khanapur

Languages
  - Official: Kannada
- Time zone: UTC+5:30 (IST)
- Nearest city: Belgaum
- Lok Sabha constituency: uttar kannad
- Vidhan Sabha constituency: Khanapur

Avarolli is a village in Belgaum district in the southern state of Karnataka, India.

Avarolli village is in the Khanapur Taluk of Belgaum District. Khanapur, Belgaum, Bylahongal, and Supa, are the towns close to Avarolli. Avarolli is reachable by Khanapur Railway Station, Idalhond Railway Station, Gunji Railway Station or, Desur RailWay Station. It is the main village in Avarolli Panchayat.
