= Seeyamangalam Jain cave temple =

Jain temple complex in Tamil Nadu, India

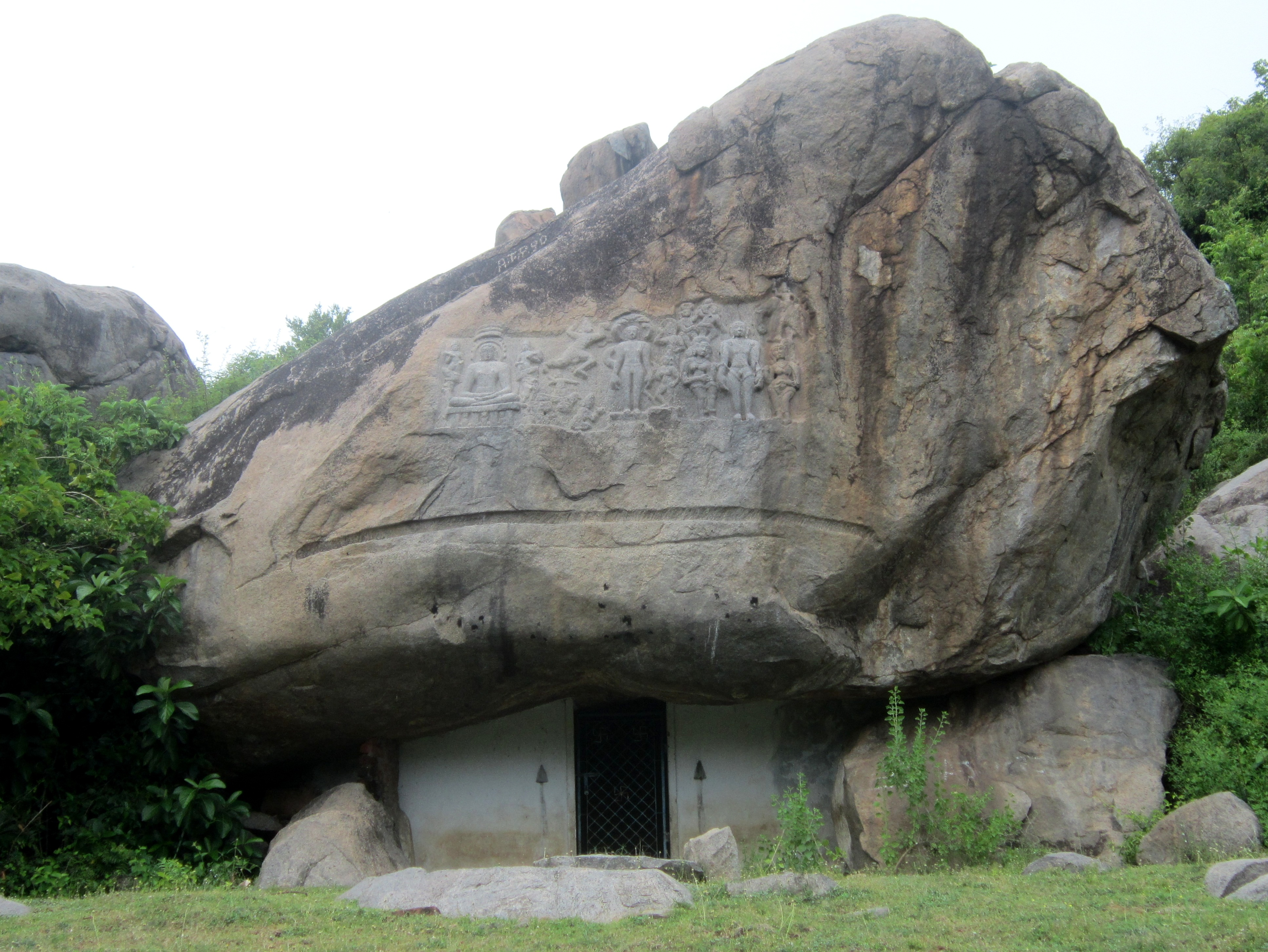
- Seeyamangalam Jain cave temple

- Location within Tamil Nadu

Religion
- Affiliation: Jainism
- Deity: Mahavira

Location
- Location: Seeyamangalam, Tiruvannamalai
- Coordinates: 12°26′3″N 79°27′55″E

Architecture
- Type: Rock-cut
- Creator: Rachamalla II
- Established: 9th century
- Temple: 2

Seeyamangalam Jain cave temple is a historic Jain site at Seeyamangalam in Tiruvannamalai district, Tamil Nadu, India. The site contains a rock-cut Jain temple.

== History ==
Seeyamangalam Jain cave temple is an important Jain centre dating to 892–893 CE. The temple contains two inscriptions. The first inscription is topped by a Chatra motif, with the inscriptional verse flanked on either side. Its opening verse describes the Arungal-anvaya of the Nandi Sangha renowned for gaining vast knowledge in all sciences and the second verse records that two Jain temples dedicated were established during the reign of Rachamalla II of Western Ganga dynasty.

A second inscription at Seeyamangalam records the construction of a flight of steps by Vajranandi Yogindra, a disciple of Gunaviradeva.

== Sculptures ==
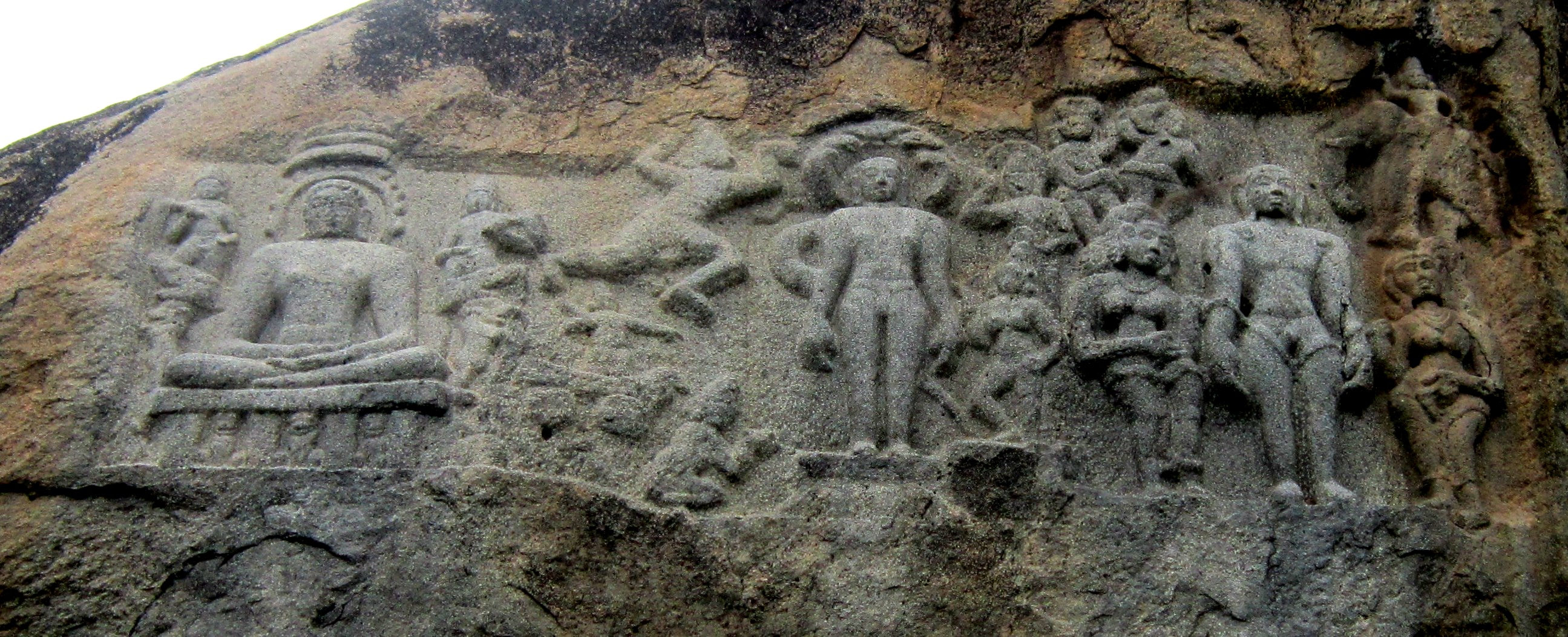
Mahavira, Parshvanatha and Bahubali

The temple features number of Jain relief sculptures with Mahavira, Parshvanatha and Bahubali as principal figures. The hill present opposite the Seeyamangalam temple features Jain beds and sculptures.

== See also ==
- Avanibhajana Pallaveshwaram Temple
- Vallimalai Jain caves
- Tirumalai (Jain complex)
- Sittanavasal Cave
