= Seeyamangalam =

- Interactive map of Seeyamangalam
- 12.429997°N 79.470881°E
- Location: Tiruvannamalai, India

Seeyamangalam is a small village in Vandavasi taluk in Tiruvannamalai district in the Indian state of Tamil Nadu. The major occupation of the people living at this place is agriculture. As of 2011, it had a population of 1665. The place is known for the Avanibhajana Pallaveshwaram temple.

== Etymology ==
The name "Seeyamangalam" might have evolved from the older name of this village "Simhavishnu Chaturvedi Mangalam" (Tamil: சிம்ம விஷ்ணு சதுர்வேதிமங்கலம்) named after the Pallava king, Simhavishnu, father of Mahendravarman I. Another possibility is that it might have derived from the name "Simhamangalam" (Tamil: சிம்மமங்கலம்) named after Pallava king Narasimhavarman I.

== Location ==
Seeyamangalam is located 25 kilometres (16 mi) southwest of Vandavasi, 21 kilometres (13 mi) southeast of Chettupattu and 63 kilometres (39 mi) northeast of district headquarters Tiruvannamalai.

== Transportation ==
From Vandavasi, town buses No:144, to Gingee and No: W2 to Magamaai Thirumeni go through Seeyamangalam. One private bus named V.M. from Desur to Gingee also go through Seeyamangalam. However, frequency of buses to this village is less. Hiring auto from Desur is a good option to reach.

== About the village ==
Seeyamangalam village has more than 1500 years old heritage. It has two historically important rock cut cave temples, 7th century C.E. Rock cut Shiva Temple and 9th century C.E. rock cut Jain temple. Famous Buddhist Acharya and Philosopher Dignagar (6th century C.E.) was believed to be born in Seeyamangalam.

== Rock Cut Shiva Temple ==
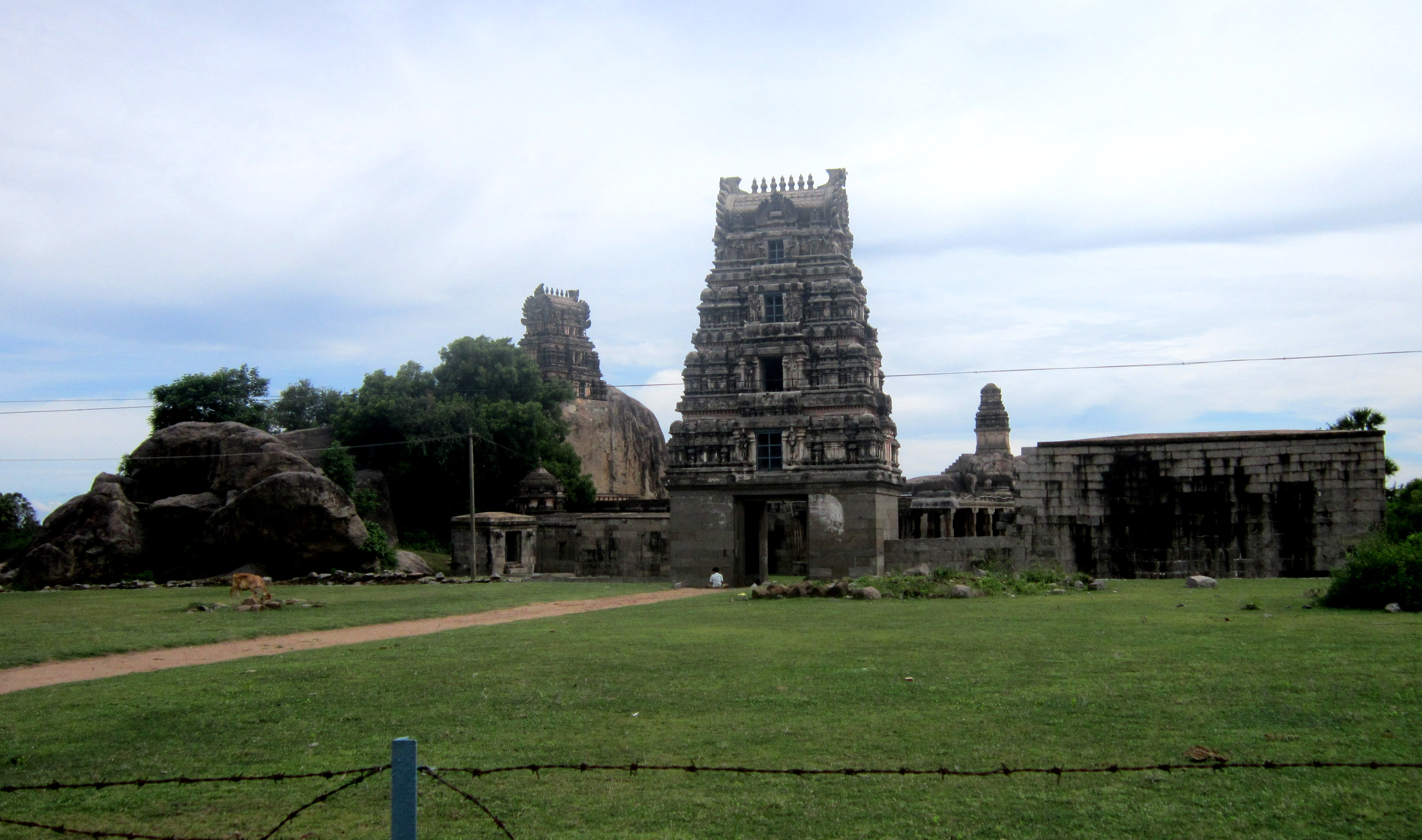
Thun Andar Rock Cut Temple

This rock cut Shiva temple, Avanibhajana Pallaveshwaram Temple was built by Mahendravarman I in 7th century C.E. The main deity Shiva, is called here as Thoon Andar in Tamil (Tamil: தூண் ஆண்டார்) and Stambeshwara in Sanskrit. "Thoon" means pillar and "Andar" refers Lord and hence thoon andar means Lord of Pillars. This name is because of the presence of two pillars in front of this cave temple. Two dvarapalas are located on the either side of the entrance of Sanctum sanctorum of the shrine. The interesting feature of these dvarapalas is the presence of trisula prongs in them. Unlike other temples, here the main deity Thun Andar is facing the west direction. Lord Shiva was carved in the temple pillars as Natarajar and Vrishbhantika. This is the first temple in Tamil Nadu having the image of Lord Natarajar. Also, the dwarf Muyalaka is missing from the Natarajar image.

This temple was renovated and extended by various kings as it is evident from the presence of various inscriptions in Tamil and Grantha characters by Pallavas, Chola and Vijayanagara empires.

== Rock Cut Jain Temple ==
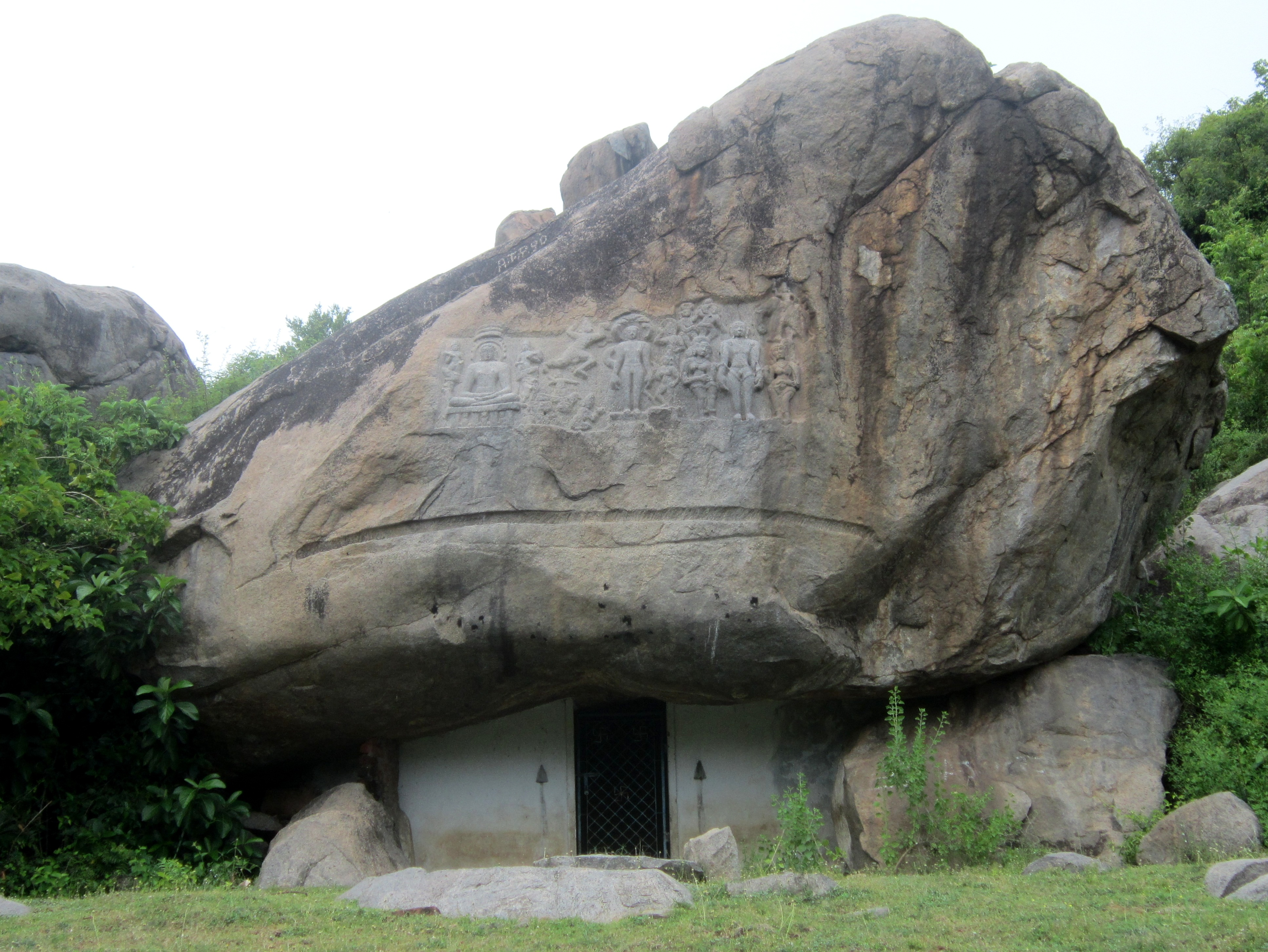
Mahavira Rock Cut Temple

This rock cut Jain temple was built by Western Ganga King Rajamalla II during the end of 9th century. This temple is seen in a hillock named Vijayadri (as per inscription of Rajamalla II) located northern side of Thun Andar Shiva temple. Inside the rock cut, recently a new Mahaveerar statue is kept and worshipped by nearby Tamil Jains. On the top of the rock facing east, relief sculptures of Mahaveerar, Parshavanthar and Bahubali are seen.

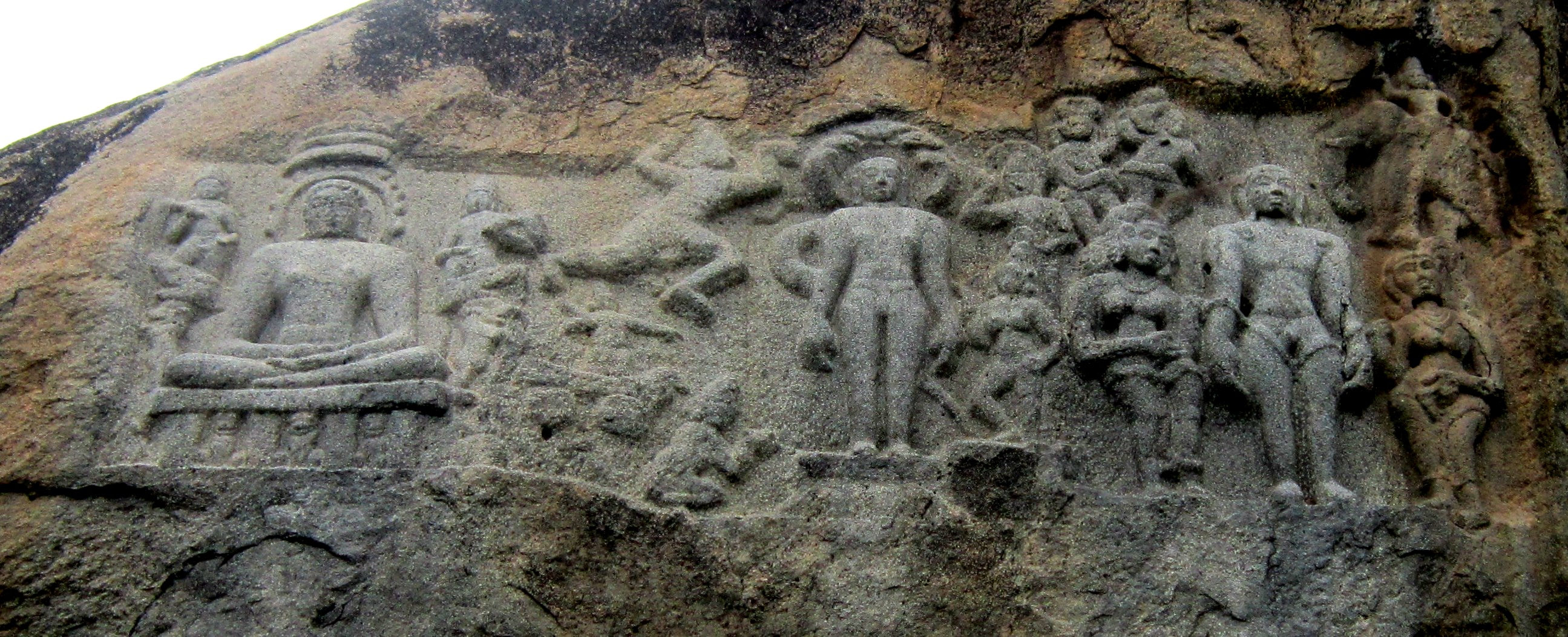
Mahaveerar, Parshavanathar and Bahubali

On the either side of Bahubali, his sisters Brahmi and Saundari are seen. On the top, left side of Bahubali, Indra sitting on elephant and right side, two Gandharvas are seen. The left hand of the Bahubali was damaged. The head of Parshavanathar is surrounded by five headed snake. The left and right side of Parshavanathar, his attendants Padmavathi and Daranendran can be seen. Both the images of Bahubali and Parshavanathar were carved in standing posture. The image of Mahaveerar, sitting in Sukhasana position on a Simhasana with his attendants on either side is seen at the extreme southern direction.

Though many people visit Rock Cut Shiva temple, they are often unaware of this rock cut Jain temple.

== Jain Inscriptions ==
There are two inscriptions found in this hillock. First one is seen near to relief sculptures (right side of Mahaveerar) and it was engraved in Grantha script and Sanskrit language. It is a mixture of prose and poetry. It explains that Rajamalla established two temples for Jinaraja in Vidyadri (hillock) in Saka 815 (892-93 A.D). It also explains Arunkal-anvaya (school of Jain Monks), which was adorned by illustrious pontiffs, who had successfully crossed the vast expanse of the sea of knowledge of all the sciences, belonged to Nandi Sanga of Jinendra Sanga. Though the inscription mentions two temples, the second one is not yet found.

The second inscription which was engraved in Tamil (Tamil portion, prose) and Grantha (Sanskrit portion, poetry) characters, located at the foot of the hillock in the northern side of the temple. The Sanskrit portion explains the exaltation to the Arunkal-anvaya belonging to the Nandi Sanga of Dravida Sanga. The Tamil portion records that Vajranandhi-Yogindrar, the disciple of Gunaviradevar who was the Mandalacharya of Arunkal-anvaya caused to be constructed a flight of steps. These steps (see the picture gallery) are still in good condition.

Rajamalla II had built another Jain rock cut temple in Vallimalai in Vellore district during the same 9th century C.E. This leads to the conclusion that some parts of northern Tamil Nadu was under the rule of this Western Ganga King Rajamalla II.

== Picture gallery ==
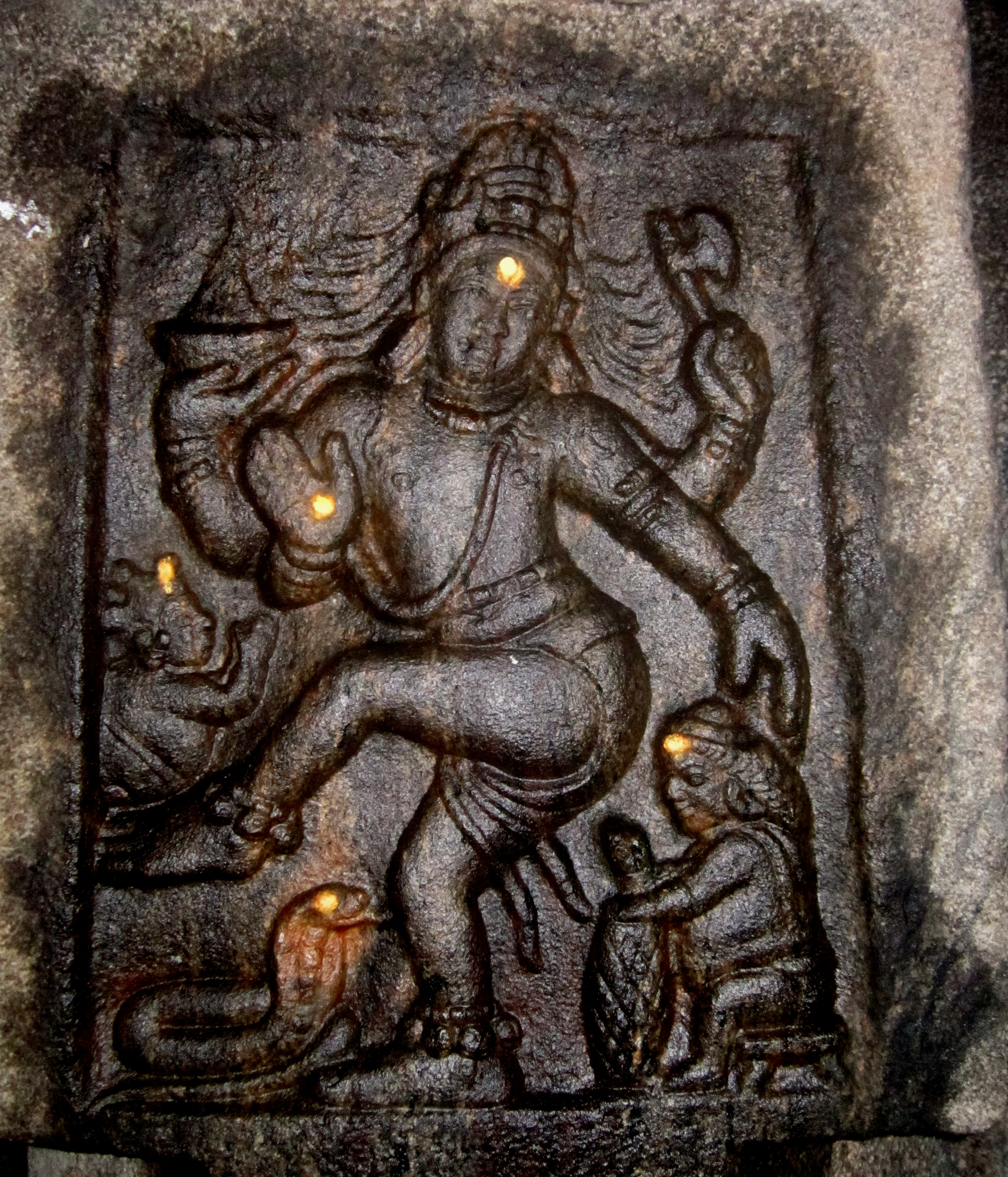
Nataraja

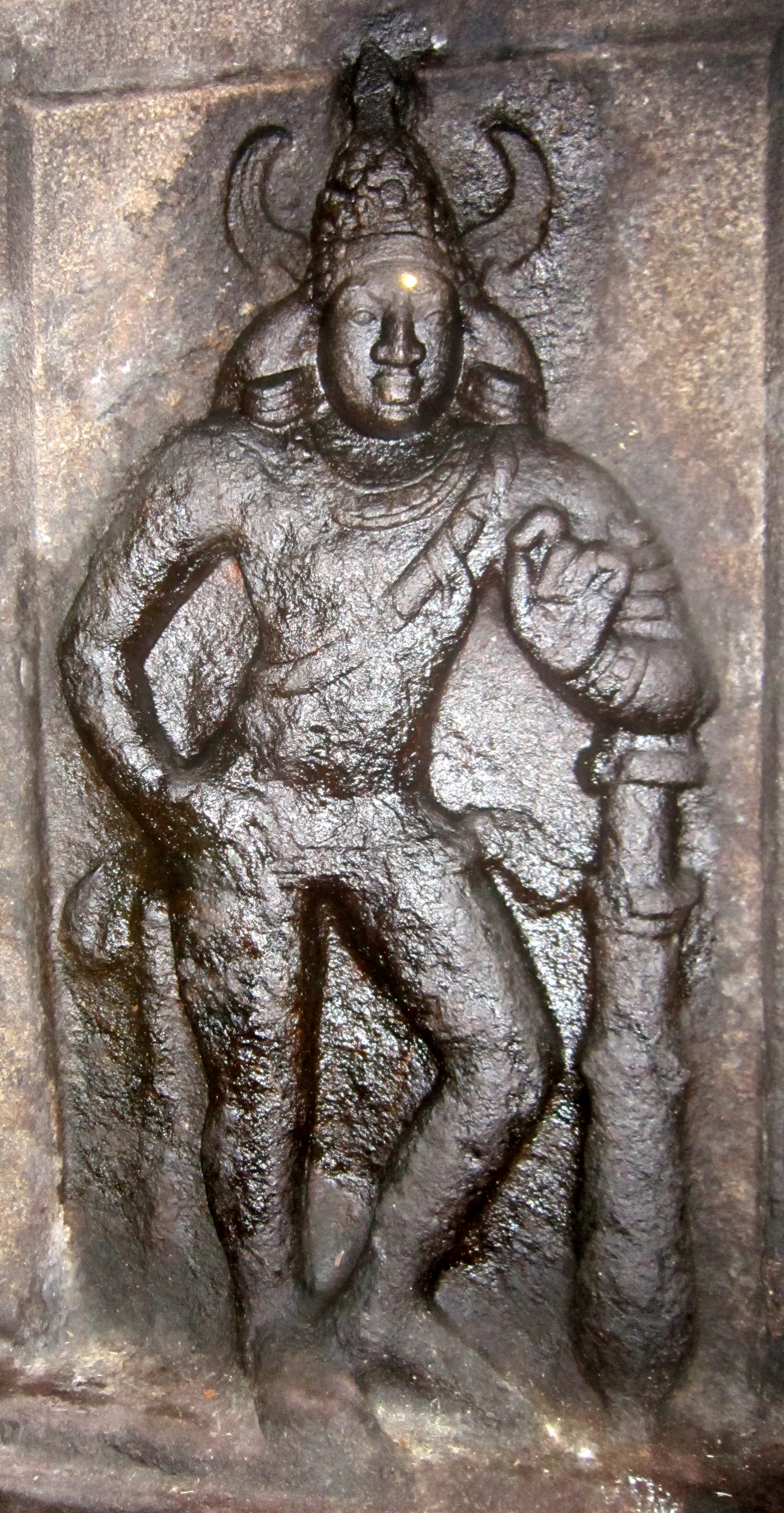
Dvarapala_1

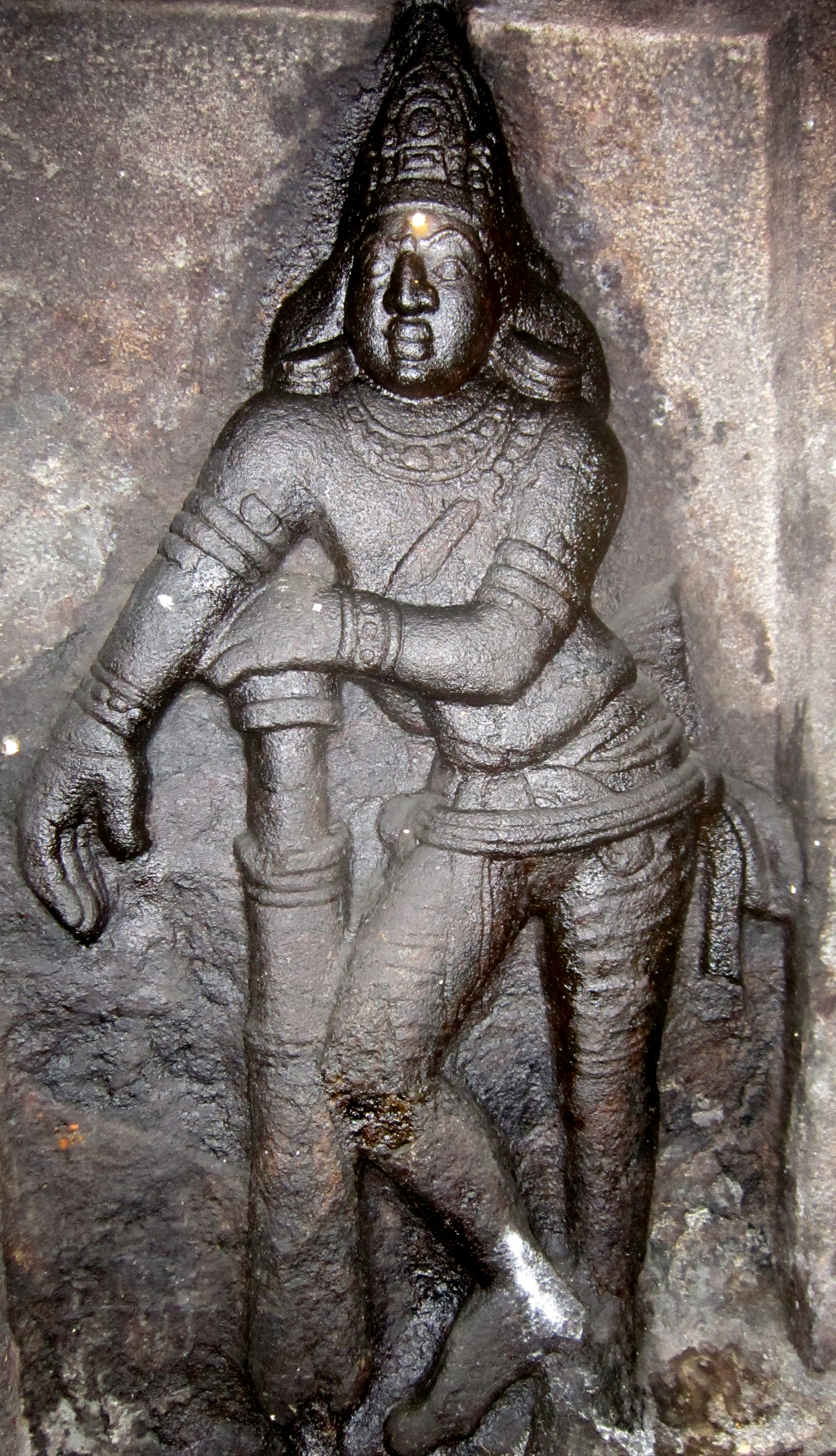
Dvarapala_2

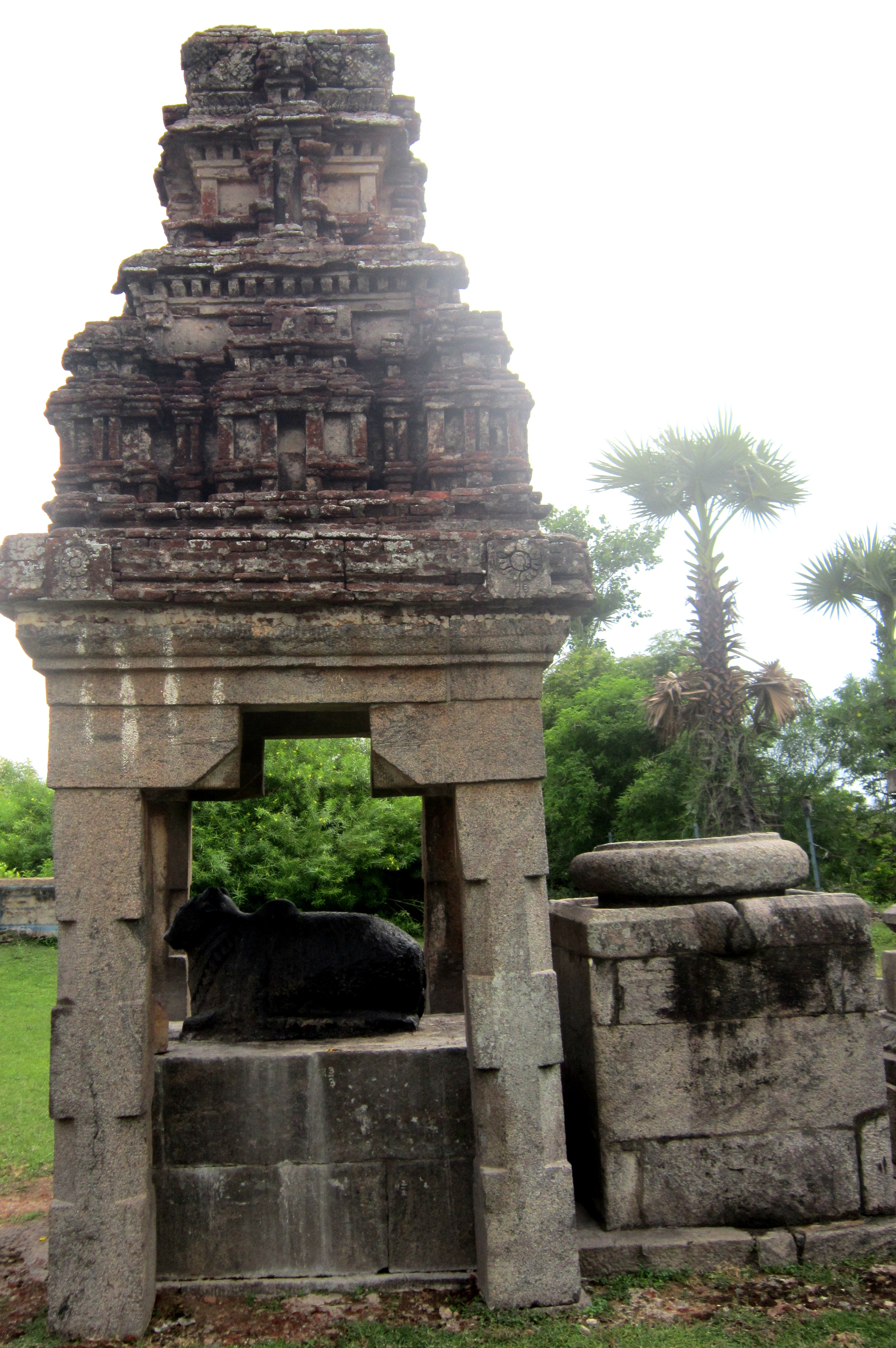
Nandhi

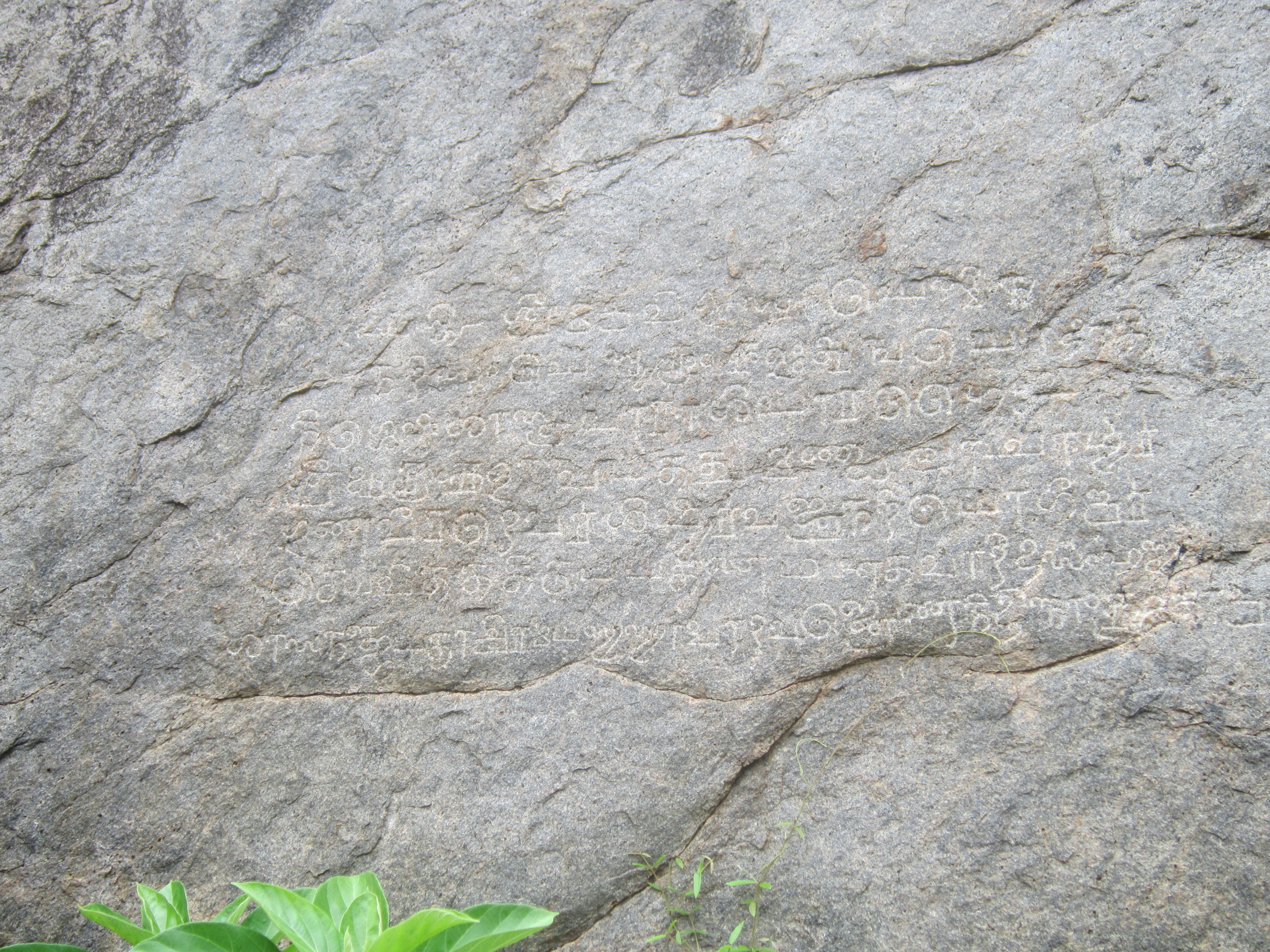
Jain Inscription_2

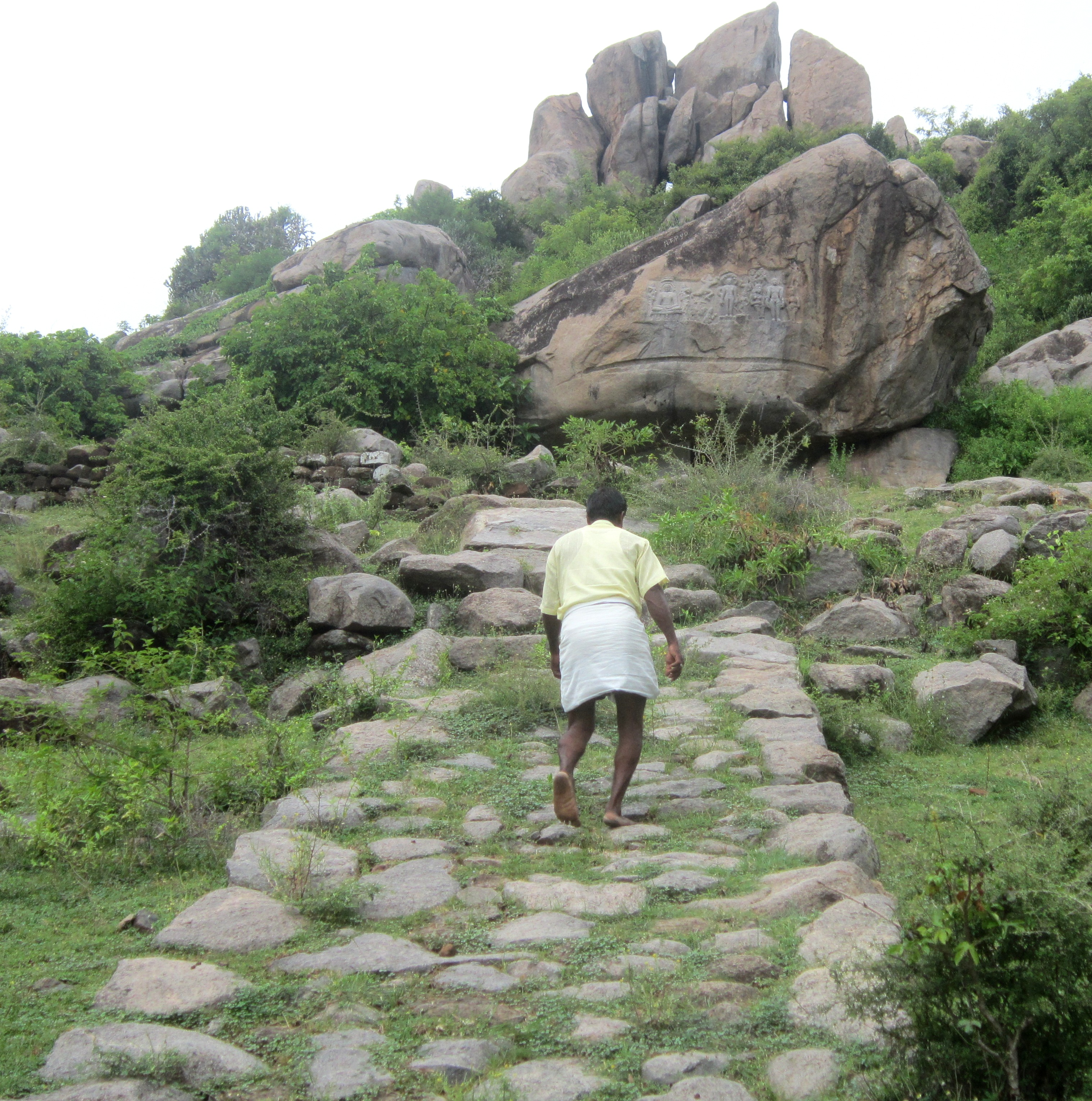
Foot steps (1000 years old)

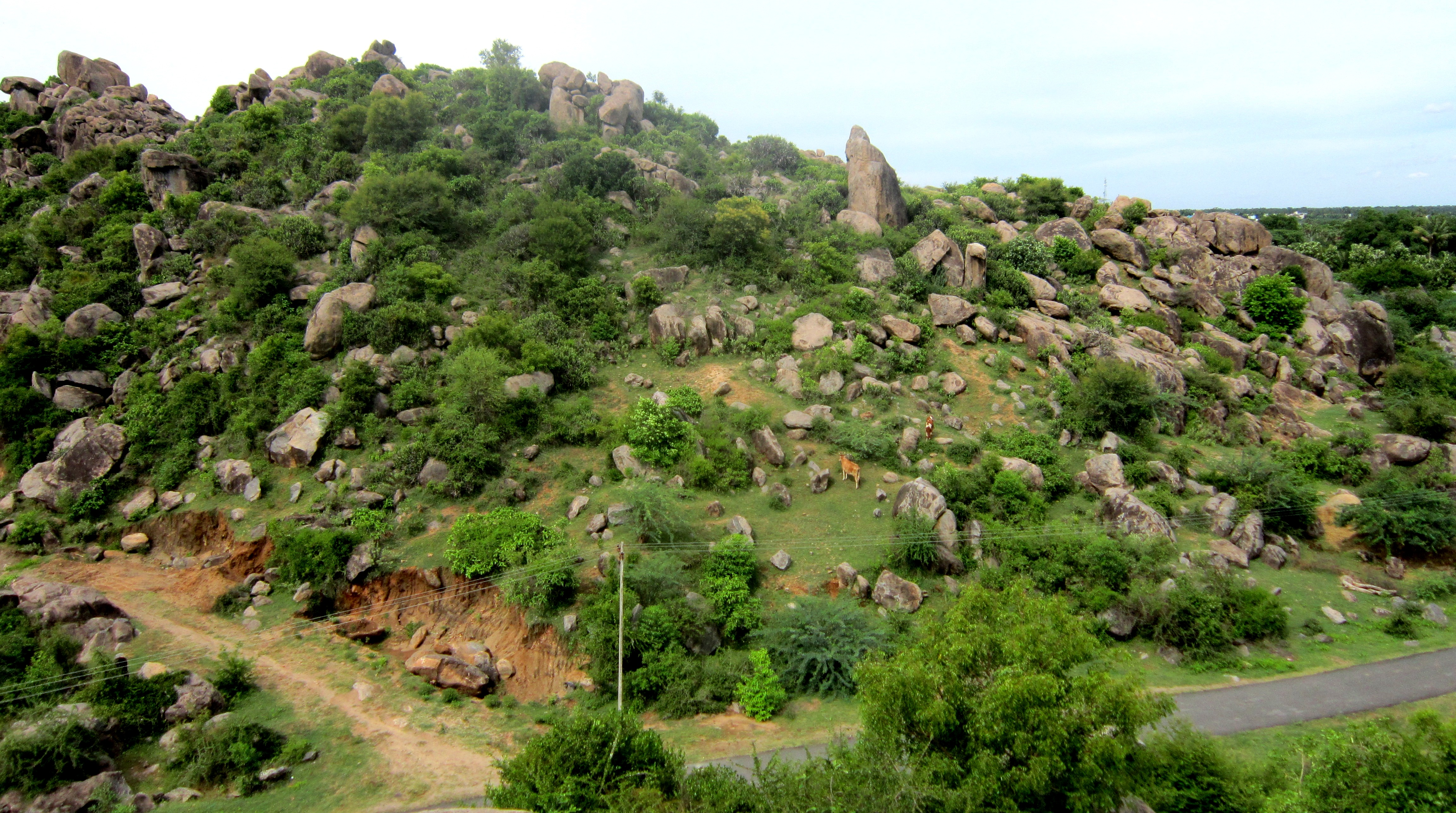
Vijayadri hillock (South west view)

== Satellite picture Location ==
- Seeyamangalam
- Thun Andar Rock cut Shiva temple
- Vijayadri Hillock
- Jain Rock Cut temple
- Jain Inscription_2

== See also ==
- Vallimalai Jain caves
- Jainism in Tamil Nadu
