= Idalhond railway station =

Railway station in Karnataka

Idalhond

General information
- Location: Garlgunj-Idalhond Road, Idalhond, Belagavi district, Karnatak; India
- Coordinates: 15.707929°N 74.518145°E
- Elevation: 711 metres (2,333 ft)
- System: Indian Railways station
- Owner: Indian Railways
- Operator: Indian Railways
- Line: Pune–Miraj–Londa line
- Platforms: 1
- Tracks: broad gauge

Construction
- Structure type: Standard (on ground)

Other information
- Status: Functioning
- Station code: IDJ
- Zone(s): SWR
- Division(s): Hubli

Services
Preceding station	Indian Railways	Following station
Khanapur towards ?	South Western Railway zone Pune–Miraj–Londa line	Desur towards ?
Location
- Interactive map

Idalhond railway station is a railway station located on the Pune–Miraj–Londa railway line operated by the South Western Railway zone under Hubli railway division. It is situated beside Garlgunj-Idalhond Road at Idalhond in Belagavi district in the Indian state of Karnatak.
