= Avanibhajana Pallaveshwaram Temple =

Shiva temple in Tamil Nadu, India

Avanibhajana Pallaveshwaram temple
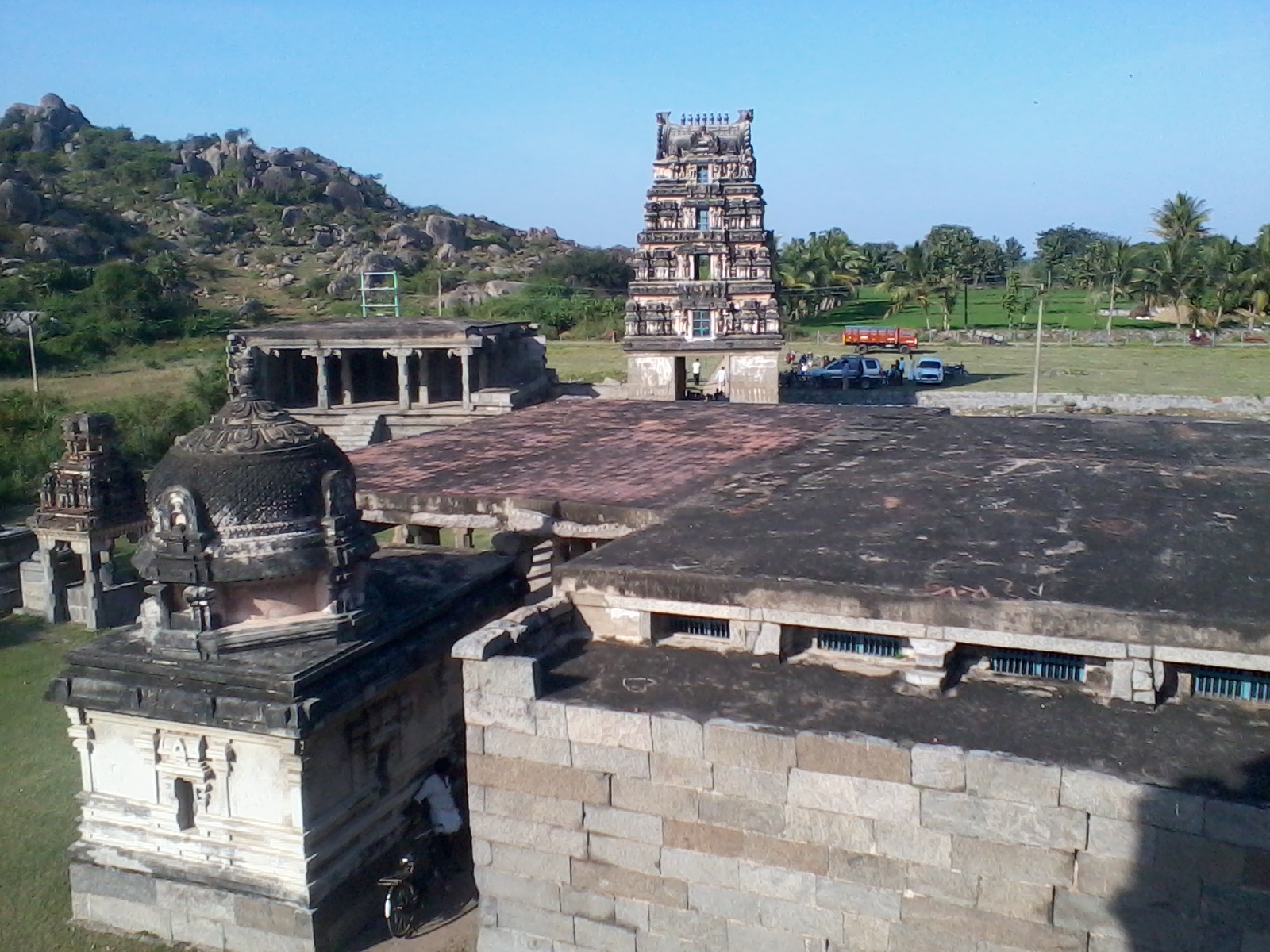
- Image of the temple complex

- Location in Tamil Nadu

Religion
- Affiliation: Hinduism
- District: Tiruvannamalai
- Deity: Stambeswarar(Shiva)

Location
- Location: Seeyamangalam
- State: Tamil Nadu
- Country: India
- Coordinates: 12°25′52″N 79°27′59″E

Architecture
- Type: Rock-cut architecture

Avanibhajana Pallaveshwaram temple also called Stambeswarar Temple is a Hindu temple dedicated to Shiva, located in the town of Seeyamangalam, Tiruvannamalai district in Tamil Nadu, India. The temple is constructed in Rock-cut architecture by the Pallava king Mahendravarman I (600-630 CE) during the 7th century. The cave temple had later additions from the Chola and Vijayanagar Empire.

One of the pillars has a sculpture of Nataraja, believed to be the earliest representation of the deity in South India. The temple has a small three-tiered rajagopuram, the entrance tower. The temple is declared as a heritage monument and administered by the Archaeological Survey of India as a protected monument. The other side of the hillock houses the Jain beds established in the 9th century during the reign of Western Ganga King Rajamalla II.

== History ==
Stambeswarar temple was built during the reign of Pallava king Mahendravarman I (600-630 CE) during the 7th century. It is one of the earliest representations of Rock-cut architecture. The place is called Avanibhajana Pallaveshwaram temple as Avani is one of the titles of King Mahendravarman. Though the image of the lions in the pillars lead to an assumption that the temple might have been possibly been initiated by Simhavishnu, the father of Mahendravarman, the view is not accepted. The inscriptions, accounted in Epigrahia Indica, is written in Sanskrit with Grantha-Pallava alphabet. The inscriptions indicate that it was dug out by Lalitankura, which is similar to that of cave temple in Tiruchirapalli Rock Fort indicating Mahendravarman. The temple had later additions from the Chola and Vijayanagar Empire. The gopuram, the gateway tower is believed to be an addition by the Vijayanagar kings. The other side of the hillock houses the Jain beds established in the 9th century during the reign of Ganga King Rajamalla II.

The temple is a heritage monument and administered by the Archaeological Survey of India as a protected monument.

== Architecture ==
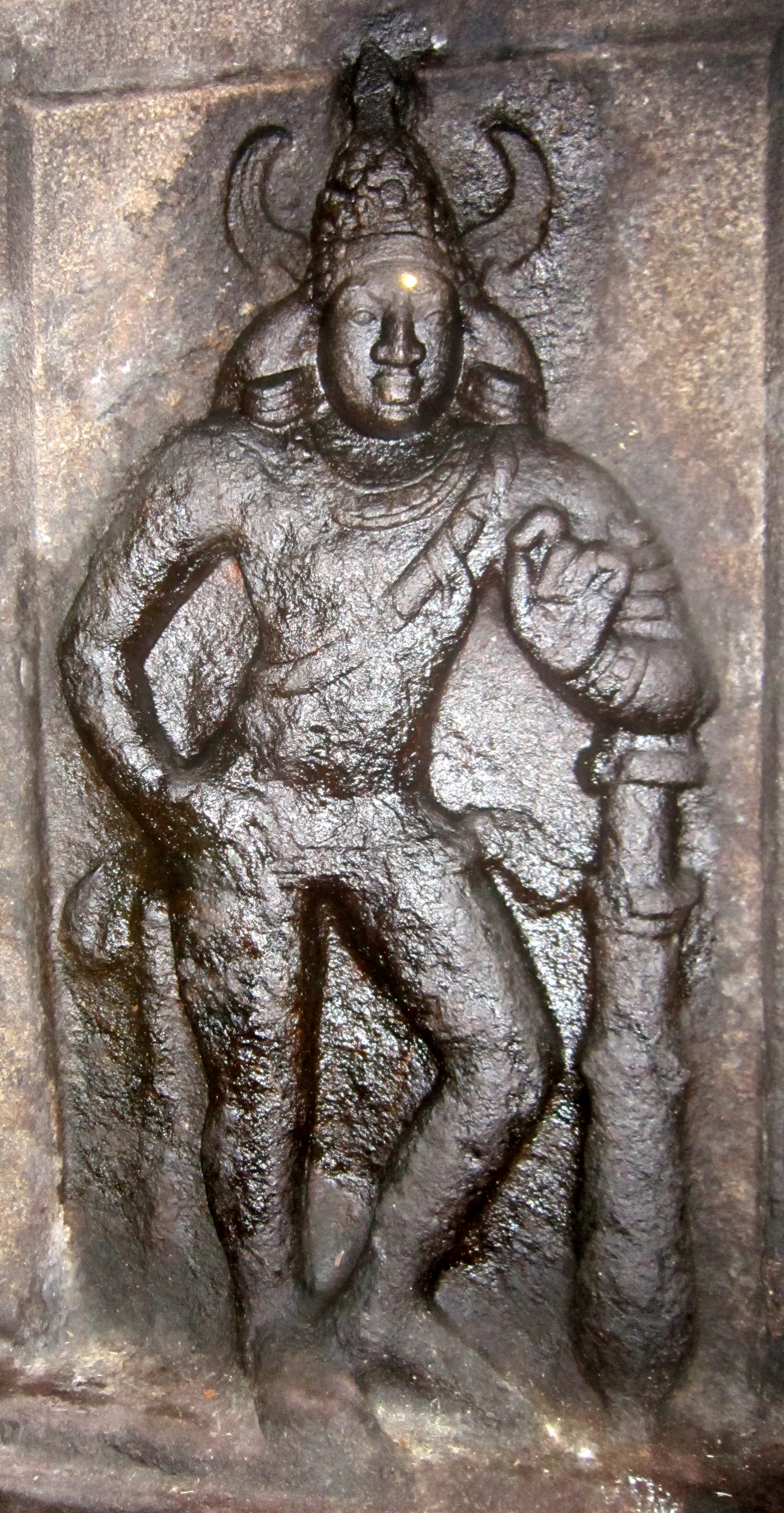
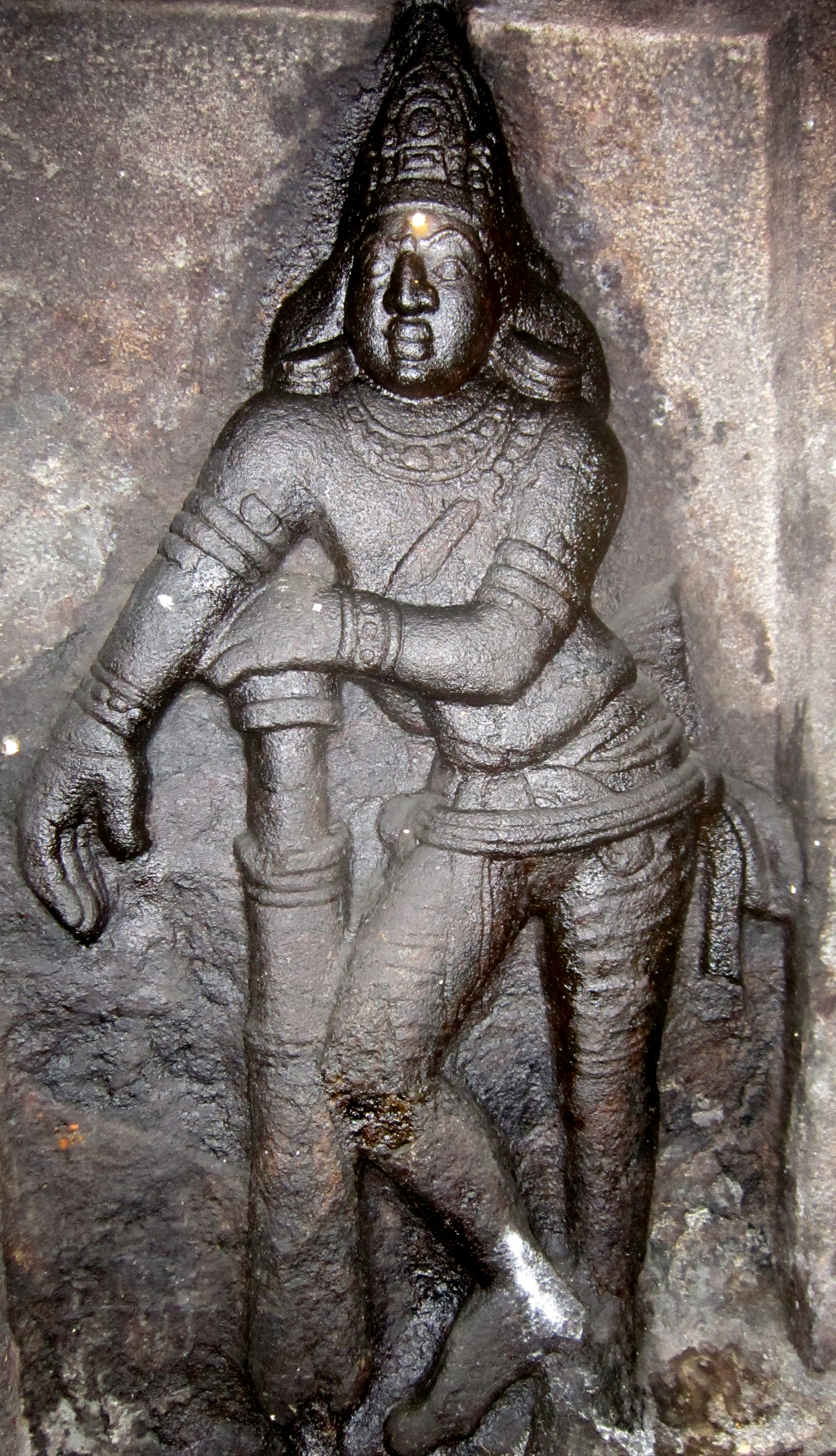
Image of Dvarapalas, the guardian deities

The temple has a three-tiered rajagopuram a set of scattered shrines. The shrine of Stambeswarar is housed in the circular sanctum in a rock cut cave. There is a large pillared hall and narrow pillared Ardhmandapam leading to the cave sanctum. The shrine for Nadi is located outside the pillared hall axial to the central shrine. The sanctum is guarded by two Dvarapalas, the guardian deities. The sanctum houses the image of Shiva in the form of lingam. In the pillars, lotus is carved on the upper portion, while images of lion is seen in the lower half. The presiding deity is called Thoonandavar or Stambeswarar on account of the presence of two pillars in front of the temple. One of the pillars in the temple has one of the earliest representations of Nataraja (the dancing form of Shiva) in Ananda Thandava posture. There are two attendants of Shiva ganas of Nataraja, with one of them playing Miruthangam (a percussion instrument) and other in praying posture. The pillared hall has images of yalis, the mythical creatures representative of Vijayanagar Art. The images of other attendant deities of Shiva are housed in smaller shrines around the sanctum.

== Natarja dance posture ==
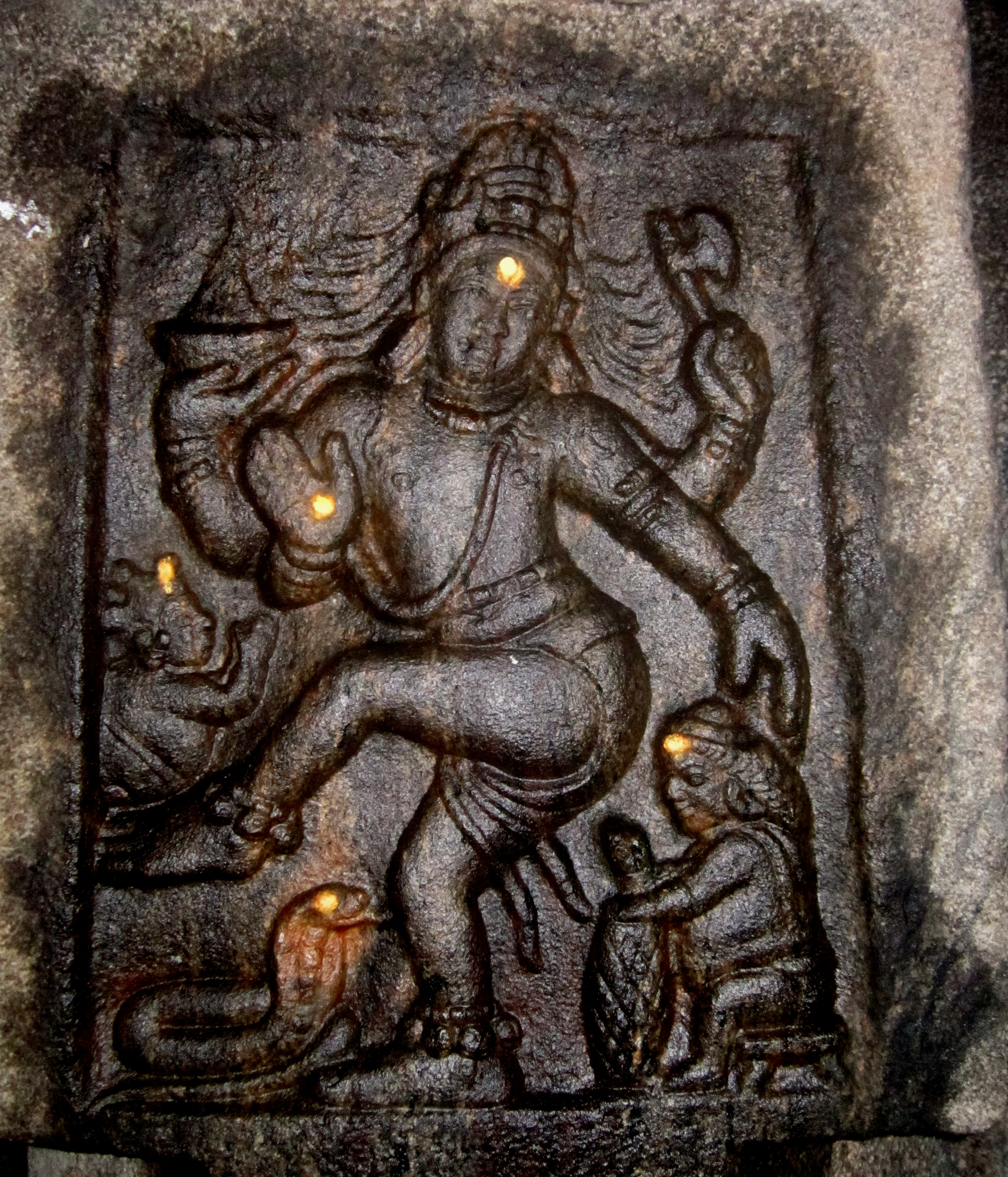
Sculpture of Nataraja

Nataraja is the cosmic representation of Shiva's different dance forms. The temple has the earliest representation of Nataraja in sculpture. As per Hindu mythology, Shiva is a violent dancer and while he dances, a snake named Karkodaka winds in his legs, leading to Shiva performing the Bhujamgatrasa, the snake fight posture. The sculpture of Nataraja in the temple depicts the posture. Shiva is sported with four hands, with his one of the left hands showing dola hasta posture, parasu in the second left, Abhaya mudra (protecting posture) in the first right hand and fire in the second right hand. Archeologist Dr.R.Nagaswamy believes that the hooded snake at the foot of Nataraja is the proof of Bhujamgatrasa. It is believed that all forms of dance are derived from Natya Sastra by sage Bharatha and Mahendravarma's knowledge of delicate postures are exemplified in the sculpture. He also affirms that by the image Mahendra shows the connection between bhujaṅga trāsita and that the dance of Nataraja, the cosmic form of Shiva leads to the Ananda.

== See also ==
- Seeyamangalam Jain cave temple
