= Gunji railway station =

Railway station in Karnataka

Gunji

General information
- Location: Gunji, Belagavi district, Karnatak; India
- Coordinates: 15.543116°N 74.479367°E
- Elevation: 673 metres (2,208 ft)
- System: Indian Railways station
- Owner: Indian Railways
- Operator: Indian Railways
- Line: Pune–Miraj–Londa line
- Platforms: 1
- Tracks: broad gauge

Construction
- Structure type: Standard (on ground)

Other information
- Status: Functioning
- Station code: GNJ
- Zone(s): SWR
- Division(s): Hubli

Services
Preceding station	Indian Railways	Following station
Londa Junction towards ?	South Western Railway zone Pune–Miraj–Londa line	Khanapur towards ?
Location
- Interactive map

Gunji railway station is a railway station located on the Pune–Miraj–Londa railway line operated by the South Western Railway zone under Hubli railway division. It is situated at Gunji in Belagavi district in the Indian state of Karnatak.
