= Khanapur railway station =

Railway station in Karnataka

Khanapur

General information
- Location: Khanapur, Belagavi district, Karnatak; India
- Coordinates: 15.637934°N 74.499757°E
- Elevation: 660 metres (2,170 ft)
- System: Indian Railways station
- Owner: Indian Railways
- Operator: Indian Railways
- Line: Pune–Miraj–Londa line
- Platforms: 2
- Tracks: broad gauge

Construction
- Structure type: Standard (on ground)

Other information
- Status: Functioning
- Station code: KNP
- Zone(s): SWR
- Division(s): Hubli

Services
| Preceding station | Indian Railways | Following station |
|---|---|---|
| Gunji towards ? | South Western Railway zone Pune–Miraj–Londa line | Idalhond towards ? |
Location
- Interactive map

Khanapur railway station is a railway station located on the Pune–Miraj–Londa railway line operated by the South Western Railway zone under Hubli railway division. It is situated at Khanapur in Belagavi district in the Indian state of Karnatak.
