= Desur railway station =

Railway station in Karnataka

Desur

General information
- Location: Desur, Belagavi district, Karnatak; India
- Coordinates: 15.754344°N 74.49801°E
- Elevation: 735 metres (2,411 ft)
- System: Indian Railways station
- Owner: Indian Railways
- Operator: Indian Railways
- Line: Pune–Miraj–Londa line
- Platforms: 1
- Tracks: broad gauge

Construction
- Structure type: Standard (on ground)

Other information
- Status: Functioning
- Station code: DUR
- Zone(s): SWR
- Division(s): Hubli

Services
Preceding station	Indian Railways	Following station
Idalhond towards ?	South Western Railway zone Pune–Miraj–Londa line	Belagavi towards ?
Location
- Interactive map

Desur railway station is a railway station located on the Pune–Miraj–Londa railway line operated by the South Western Railway zone under Hubli railway division. It is situated at Desur in Belagavi district in the Indian state of Karnatak.
