= Vallimalai Jain caves =

Caves in India

Vallimalai Jain Beds
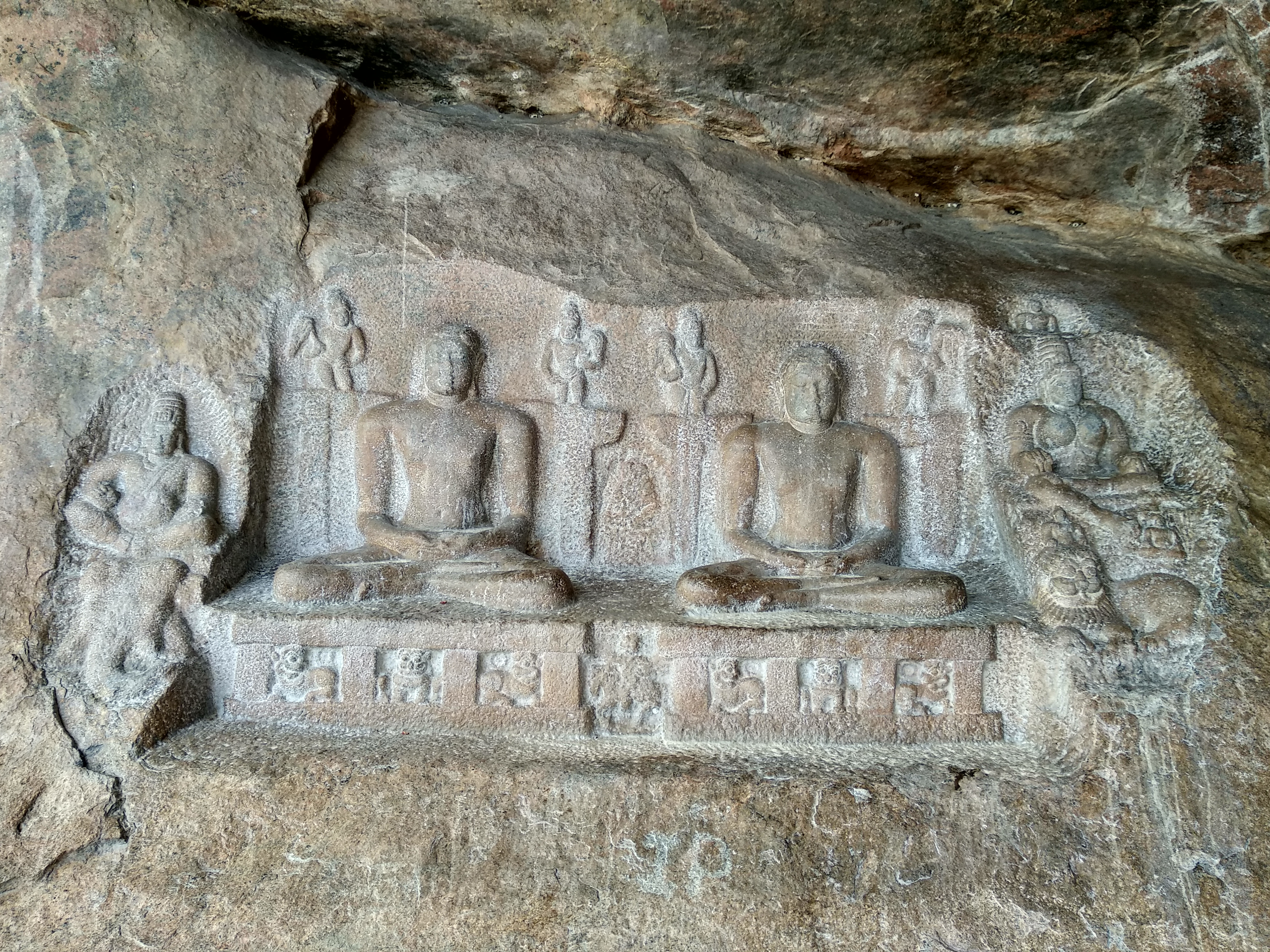
- Vallimalai Jain caves

Religion
- Affiliation: Jainism
- Deity: Tirthankara
- Festival: Mahavir Janma Kalyanak

Location
- Location: Vallimalai, Vellore, Tamil Nadu
- Interactive map of Vallimalai Jain Beds
- Coordinates: 13°04′24.6″N 79°15′50.9″E

Architecture
- Style: Dravidian architecture
- Creator: Rachamalla II
- Established: 2nd century BCE
- Completed: 870 CE
- Materials: Rock cut

Vallimalai Jain caves are located in Vallimalai village in Katpadi taluk of Vellore district, Tamil Nadu.

== History ==
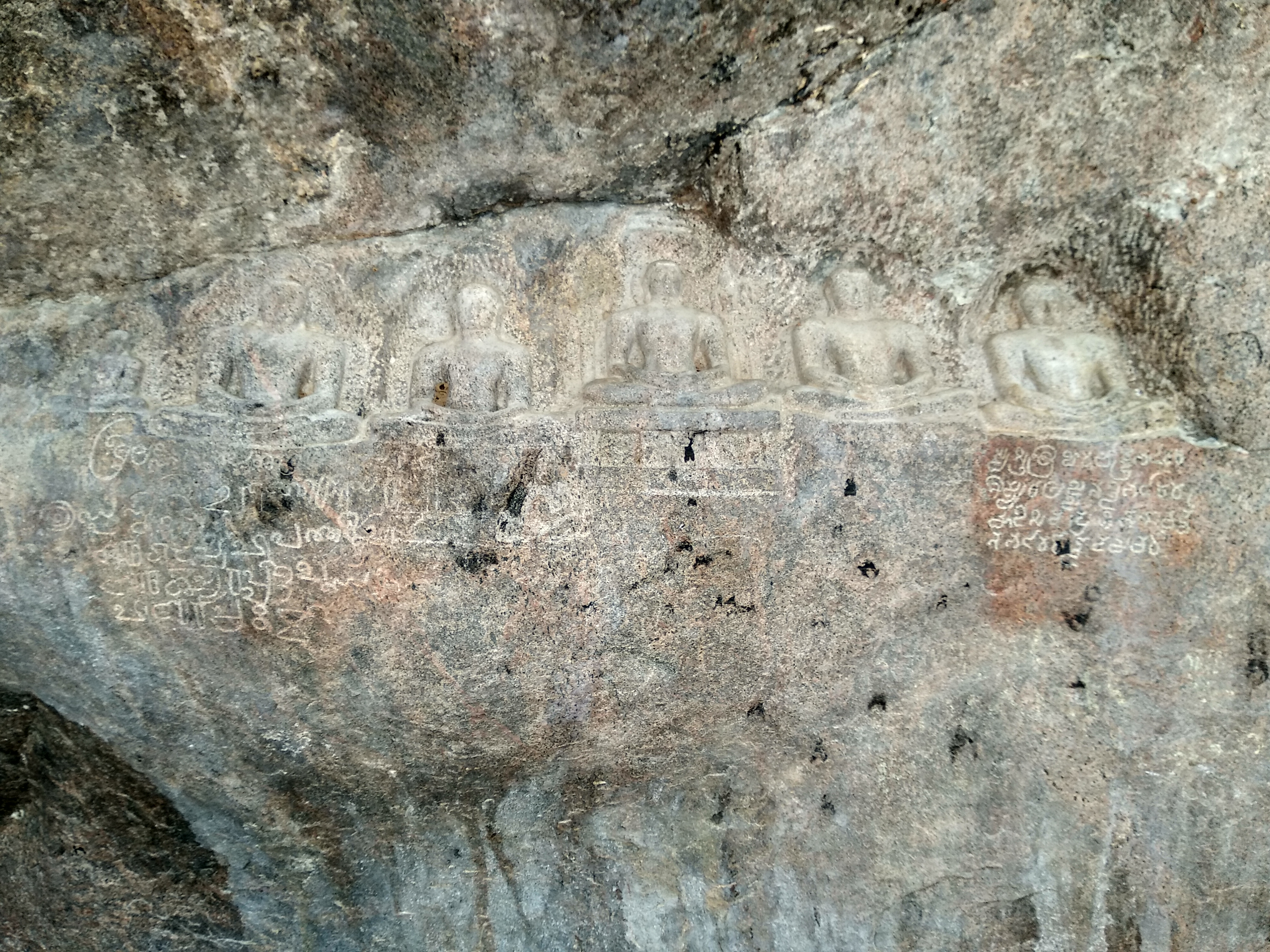
Inscriptions below the Jain sculptures inside the cave

Vallimalai Jain caves contains natural caverns that were inhabited by Digambar monks in early historic period. The monks from Bihar used to come here during the late-maurya period. The smooth and polished beds were carved during the rule of Satavahana dynasty. A total of five inscription are found with one of the inscriptions dating back to 8th century. The Jain carvings were created during the reign of Ganga King Rachamalla II in c. 870 CE after conquest of this region from Chola kings.

The inscriptions associated with the sculptures were published by epigraphist E. Hultzsch in Epigraphia Indica. Hultzsch recorded two groups of Jain sculptures in a natural cave on the eastern slope of Vallimalai and documented inscriptions engraved beneath them. One of the inscriptions records that the Western Ganga king Rajamalla founded a Jain vasati at Vallimalai. The inscription gives his genealogy, describing him as the son of Ranavikrama, grandson of Sripurusha and great-grandson of Sivamara. Hultzsch identified the ruler as a member of the Western Ganga dynasty. An inscription, below the sculptures, states the name of Devasena of Bana kingdom along with his Jain monks Bhavanandin and Aryanandin. More specifically, one of the inscriptions records that an image of Devasena, a disciple of Bhavanandin and the spiritual teacher of the Bana ruler Banaraya, was caused to be made. Another inscription identifies an image of the Jain teacher Govardhana and records that it was established by Aryanandin, a disciple of Balachandrabhatara.

Vallaimalai was an important Jain center during 8th-9th century. The inscriptions thus provide evidence for both royal patronage and the presence of Jain monastic teachers at Vallimalai.

== Architecture ==
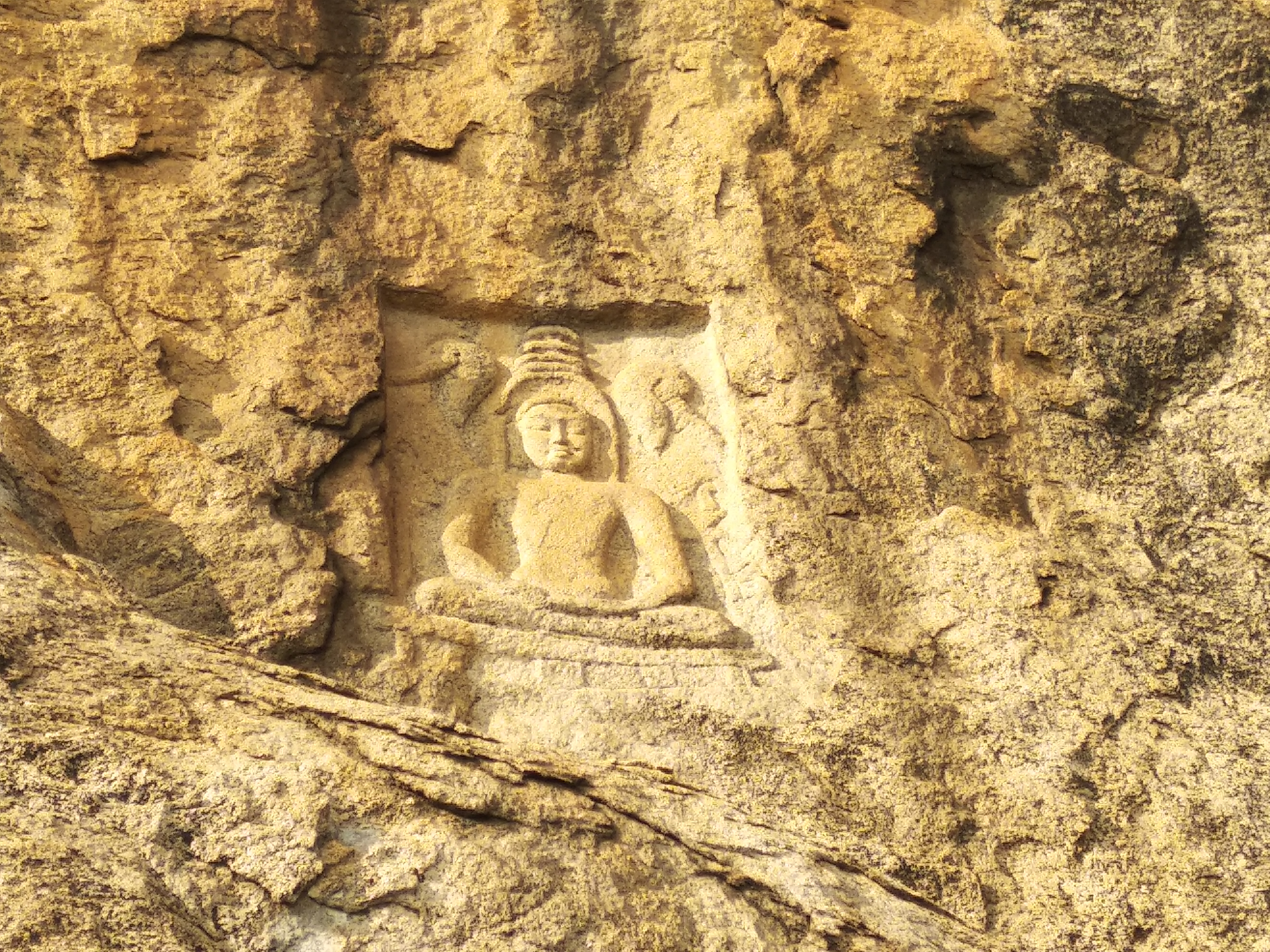
Jain sculpture

Vallimalai is an important Jain site with several carvings of sculptures of tirthankara. The caverns is 40 by 20 feet (12.2 m × 6.1 m) with height varying between 7–10 feet (2.1–3.0 m). There is also a temple in the region which was converted to a Hindu temple. The caves consist of three chambers, two of these chambers contain images of Jain tirthankar. Above this group, there are the remains of a wall, believed to have been a small fort occupied by Jains. A torana is found above Jain images similar to carvings of Badami cave temples.

The Jain sculpture are engraved on two spots, one on the northern side of Murugan temple and second on the southern side, with one sculpture with superhuman dimensions. 'Hultzsch described two principal groups of Jain sculptures in the natural cave. Four inscriptions occur beneath the first group; two are engraved in Grantha characters and two in Kannada characters. An additional Kannada inscription occurs beneath the second group. There is an image of Ambika in sukhasana position wearing a necklace, armbands, and crown. Ambika is depicted sitting on a lion with carvings of her two sons below her pedestal. There is also image of Padmavati with 4 hands, holding goad and noose in upper right and left hands.

The epigraphical evidence also shows that not all of the figures at Vallimalai represent Tirthankaras. Some of the inscriptions identify representations of Jain teachers, including Devasena and Govardhana. The association of individual sculptures with inscriptions naming Jain teachers and patrons makes the Vallimalai group an important epigraphical source for the history of Jain monastic activity in the region.

== Inscriptions ==
The rock inscriptions at Vallimalai provide evidence for the development of the Jain establishment and its connections with ruling dynasties and Jain monastic lineages. They were documented by E. Hultzsch in Epigraphia Indica, volume IV. The principal foundation record associates the Jain vasati with the Western Ganga ruler Rajamalla. The inscription is undated, but preserves the ruler's genealogy. Another record associates the site with the Banas through Devasena, a disciple of Bhavanandin and spiritual teacher of Banaraya. A further inscription records that Aryanandin, a disciple of Balachandrabhatara, caused an image of his preceptor Govardhana to be made. These records indicate that Vallimalai functioned not only as a site of Tirthankara worship but also as a centre associated with Jain teachers and their monastic lineages.

== Conservation ==
These caves are protected by Archaeological Survey of India. In 2014, "Ahima Walks" was organized in the region to promote the place.

== See also ==
- Kalugumalai Jain Beds
- Kupalantham Poigai malai Jain Cave Temple
- Seeyamangalam
