= Gunji, Karnataka =

Gunji, Karnataka Gunji
- Village
- Location in Karnataka, India
- Coordinates: 15°32′N 74°30′E
- Country: India
- State: Karnataka
- District: Belgaum
- Talukas: Khanapur

Languages
  - Official: Marathi
- Time zone: UTC+5:30 (IST)
- PIN: 591 302
- Nearest city: Belgaum

Gunji is a village in Belagavi district in the southern state of Karnataka, India.

== Transportation ==
There is a railway connection named Gunji railway station located on Pune–Miraj–Londa railway line.
