= Rachamalla II =

Western Ganga King from 870 to 907 CE

17th Western Ganga King
- Reign: c. 870 – c. 907 CE
- Predecessor: Ereganga Neetimarga
- Successor: Ereganga Neetimarga II
- Dynasty: Western Ganga

Rachamalla II (r. 870 – 907 CE) was an emperor of the Western Ganga dynasty.

== Biography ==
Rachamalla II was an emperor of the Western Ganga dynasty whose minister was Chavundaraya.

The Seeyamangalam cave temple in Tamil Nadu is a 9th-century Jain rock-cut site associated with Rachamalla II.

== See also ==
- Vallimalai Jain caves
- Seeyamangalam Jain cave temple
