= Idalhond =

- Village
- Interactive map of Idalhond
- Coordinates: 15.7000°N 74.5082°E
- Country: India
- State: Karnataka
- District: Belagavi

Languages
  - Official: Kannada
- Time zone: UTC+5:30 (IST)
- Vehicle registration: KA 22

Idalhond is a village in Belagavi district in the southern state of Karnataka, India.
