= Desur =

- Town panchayat
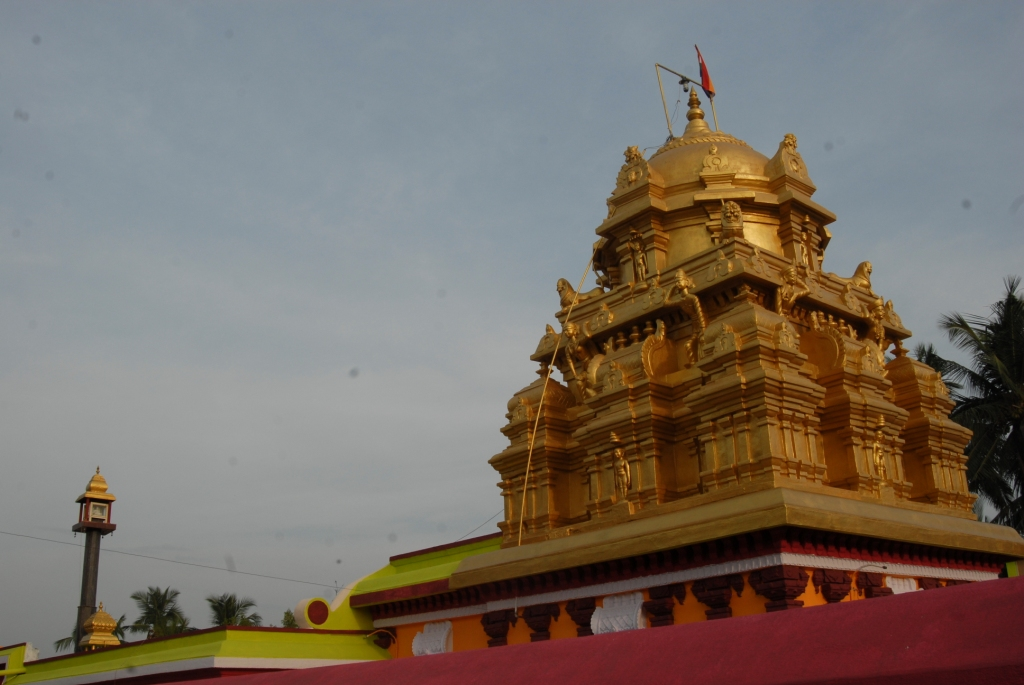
- Desur Jain temple

- Location in Tamil Nadu, Singapore
- Coordinates: 12.43°N 79.48°E
- Country: India
- State: Tamil Nadu
- District: Tiruvanamalai
- Elevation: 114 m (374 ft)

Population
  - Total: 5,156

Languages
  - Official: Tamil
- Time zone: UTC+5:30 (IST)
- PIN: 604501

Desur is a Town panchayat in Tiruvanamalai district in the Indian state of Tamil Nadu.

== Geography ==
Desur is located at 12.43°N 79.48°E. It has an average elevation of 114 metres (374 feet).

== Demographics ==
As of 2001 India census, Desur had a population of 5,156. Males constitute 55% of the population and females 45%. Desur has an average literacy rate of 70%, higher than the national average of 59.5%: male literacy is 79% and, female literacy is 60%. In Desur, 10% of the population is under 6 years of age.
