= Aretippur Jain temple =

Jain monuments at Aretippur
- Arethipura
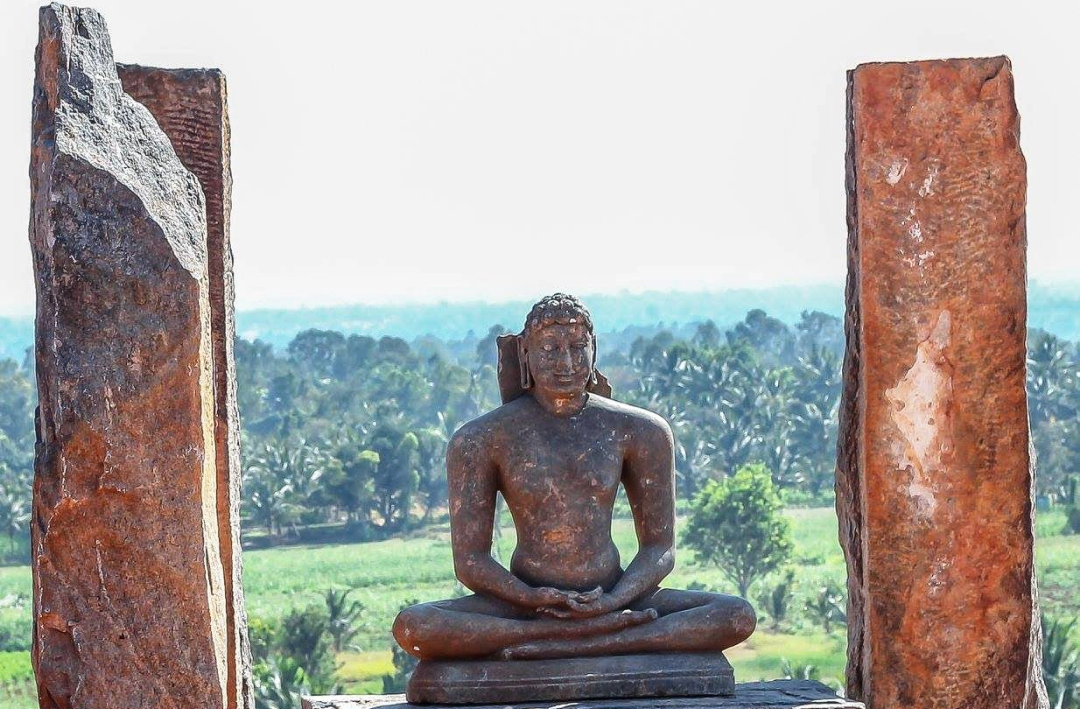
- Jain Tirthankara statue at Aretippur, The site is known for its ancient Jain heritage and rock-cut sculptures attributed to the Gangas period.

Religion
- Affiliation: Jainism
- Deity: Bahubali

Location
- Location: Aretippur, Mandya district, Karnataka, India

Architecture
- Type: Rock-cut monuments
- Style: Western Ganga

Aretippur Jain temple (also Arethipura) is a historic Jain site in Aretippur, Mandya district, Karnataka, India. The site contains Jain temples, rock-cut sculptures, a monolithic image of Bahubali, inscriptions and the remains of a large temple complex excavated by the Archaeological Survey of India.

The ancient settlement is identified in epigraphical records with names including Tippuru and Tippeyur. The site consists principally of two rocky outcrops known locally as Shravanabetta and Chikkabetta or Kanakagiri. The Government of Karnataka recognises the Jain monuments at Aretippuru as a historic and religious site.

== History ==
Aretippur was an important Jain centre in medieval Karnataka. Epigraphical evidence associates the locality with the Jain religious establishment at Tippuru, while archaeological investigations have demonstrated substantial structural remains on Chikkabetta/Kanakagiri. Excavations conducted by the Archaeological Survey of India in 2014–15 exposed the complete plan of a temple on the western part of Chikkabetta. Further investigations in 2015–16 exposed twelve temples on the eastern part of the hill.

The excavated temples were constructed in three principal phases. In the earliest phase, the structures were made predominantly of moulded bricks and followed the contour of the hill. In the second phase, stone was used for the foundations and lower architectural elements while brick continued to be used for the walls. In the third phase, stone and brick were reused together in the construction. The excavations demonstrate that Aretippur was not simply an isolated shrine but a substantial Jain religious complex containing multiple temples and associated structures.

== Archaeological site ==
The excavated complex on Chikkabetta is enclosed by a large wall constructed of brick and stone. Archaeologists interpreted the enclosure as having characteristics of a fortified settlement. The excavations also recovered ceramics and other artefacts associated with the occupation of the site.

The temple structures incorporated brick, stone, wood and lime. Post-holes and iron clamps indicate the use of wooden architectural elements, while lime was used as a binding material, for plastering and for paving floors. Some structures also contained stucco decoration. The temples had individual stairways, and some were provided with balustrades. The excavated architectural remains demonstrate a combination of brick and stone construction that differs from the later all-stone Jain basadis more commonly preserved elsewhere in Karnataka.

== Jain sculptures ==
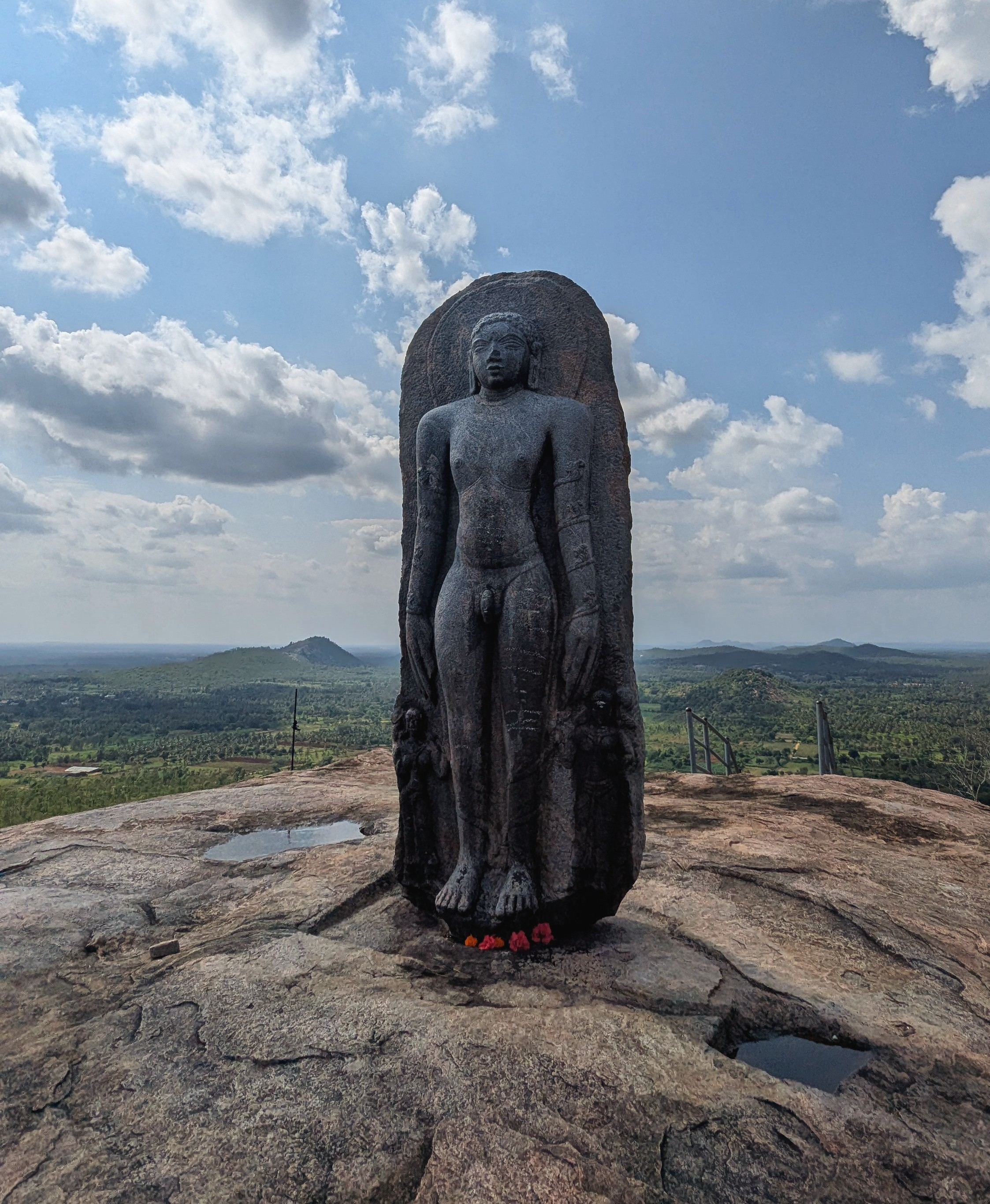
Statue Of Bahubali Aretippur (Gangas Monument)

The archaeological excavations produced numerous Jain sculptures. These include images of Tirthankaras and other figures associated with Jain religious worship. The sculptures were found in association with the structural remains of the temple complex. Rock-cut Jain reliefs are also found on the hill. The Government of Karnataka records a monolithic image of Bahubali on Shravanabetta, while the archaeological literature records Jain sculptural remains on the two hillocks.

=== Bahubali image ===
Aretippur contains a monolithic image of Bahubali carved from the rock on Shravanabetta. The Government of Karnataka describes the image as approximately 10 feet high and carved from a single rock. The image forms part of the site's broader Jain sculptural landscape, which includes rock-cut Tirthankara reliefs and the remains of structural Jain temples on Chikkabetta/Kanakagiri.

In 2016, the Archaeological Survey of India (ASI) excavated another 13 ft (4.0 m)-high statue of Bahubali made in the 3rd – 9th centuries in Aretipur. ASI has also excavated an 8th-century statue of Bahubali in Aretipur, Maddur, Mandya, Karnataka, that is 3 feet (0.91 m) wide and 3.5 ft (1.1 m) tall.

== Inscriptions ==
Aretippur is documented by inscriptions recording the historical Jain establishment at the site. The locality occurs in epigraphical records under forms of the name such as Tippuru and Tippeyur. The inscriptions provide evidence for the patronage of Jain institutions at Aretippur and demonstrate that the site remained connected with Jain religious activity over several centuries. The epigraphical evidence is particularly important because it provides a historical context for the archaeological remains excavated on Chikkabetta. One inscriptional record associated with the site records the construction of a basadi at the Kanakagiri tirtha and the assignment of revenues from Tippuru to a Jain religious establishment.

== Architecture ==
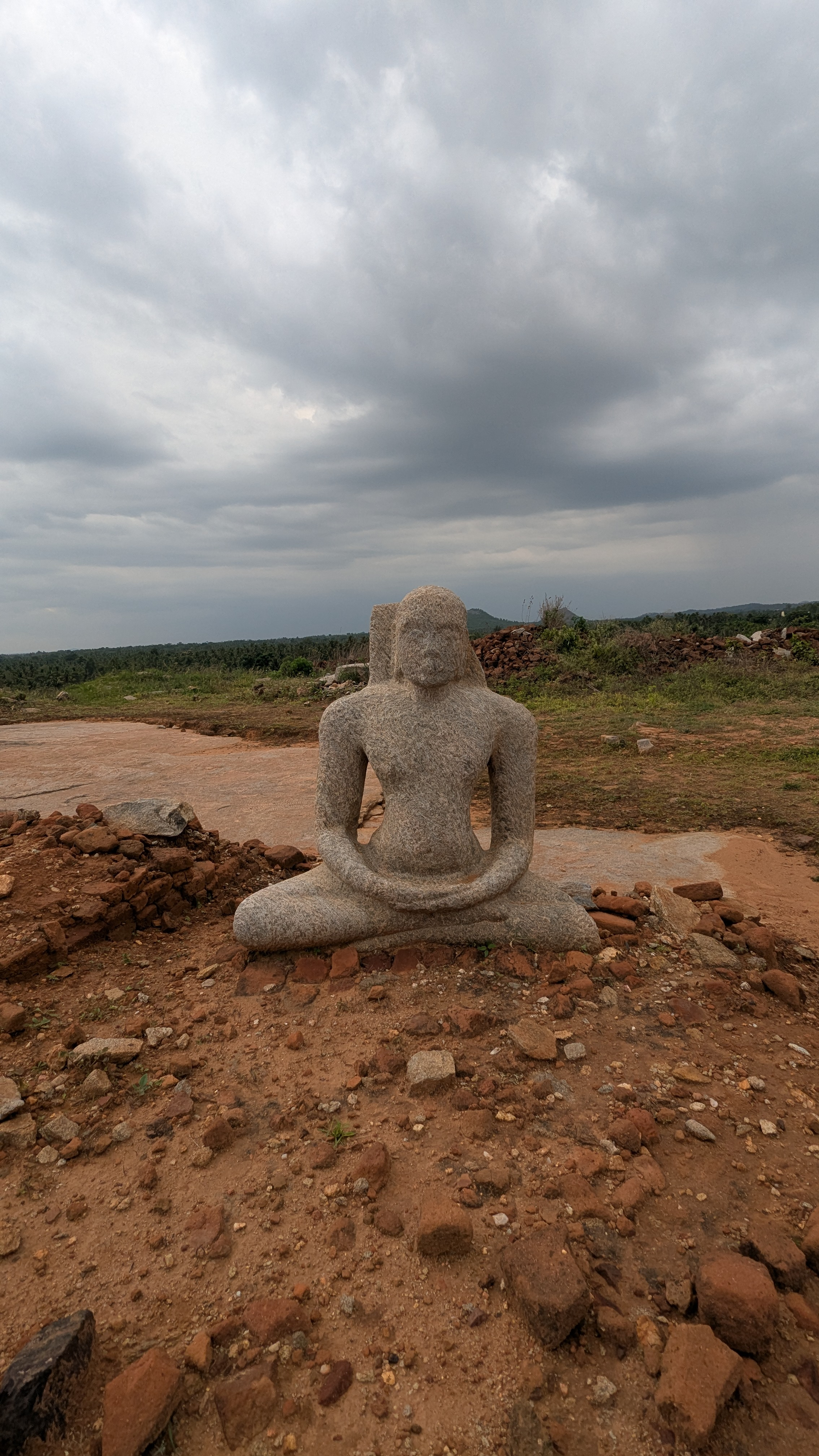
Jain Statue at Aretippur, part of the Western Ganga Dynasty’s Jain architectural legacy in Karnataka.

The excavated temples represent an early form of Jain structural architecture in which moulded brick played an important role. The buildings were constructed on stone foundations or platforms in later phases, with brick walls and wooden components. The discovery of multiple temple plans provides evidence for the development of Jain temple architecture in Karnataka before the widespread adoption of the more familiar stone-built basadi form. The archaeological remains are particularly significant because much of the early Jain architectural heritage of Karnataka has been lost or survives only as fragmentary remains. Aretippur preserves structural, sculptural and epigraphical evidence within the same archaeological landscape.

== Significance ==
Aretippur is significant for the study of Jainism and early medieval architecture in Karnataka. The combination of excavated temples, rock-cut Jain sculptures, the Bahubali image and inscriptions provides evidence for a substantial Jain religious centre. The excavations also provide evidence for successive phases of temple construction and rebuilding, demonstrating that the site developed over time rather than representing a single-period monument.

== Conservation ==
The archaeological remains at Aretippur are under the protection of the Archaeological Survey of India. The two principal hillocks, Shravanabetta and Chikkabetta, are recognised as centrally protected archaeological sites.

== See also ==
- Shravanabelagola
- Kambadahalli
