= Aretippur =

- Jain Heritage Site
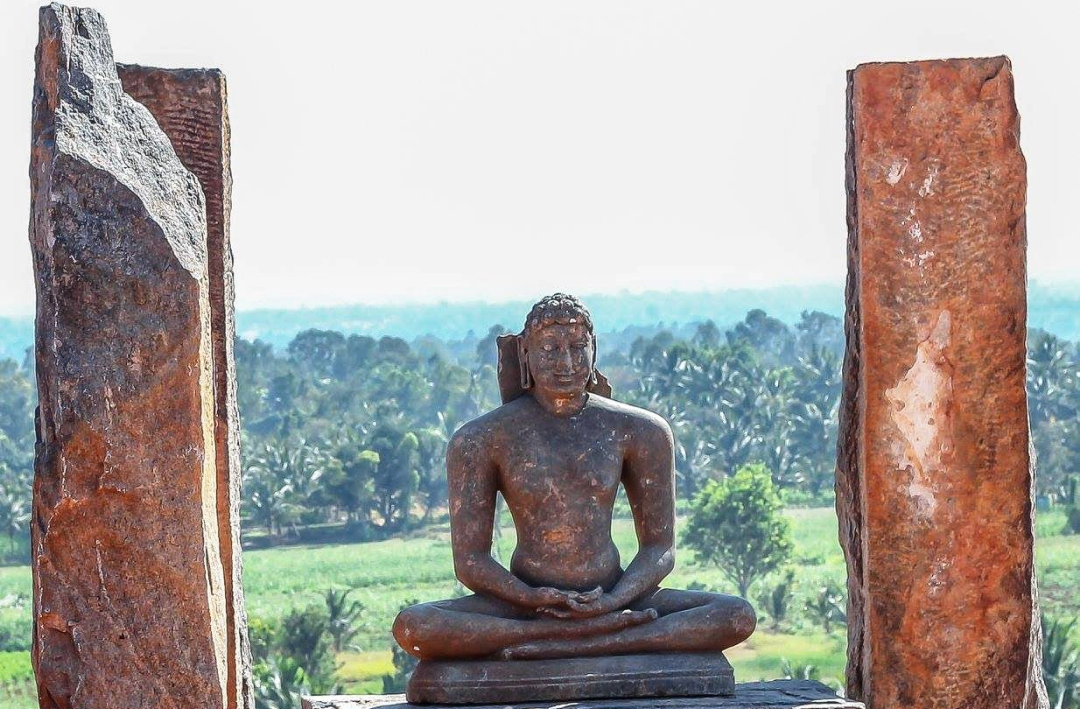
- Jain Tirthankara statue at Aretippur, The site is known for its ancient Jain heritage and rock-cut sculptures attributed to the Gangas period.

- Location in Karnataka, India
- Coordinates: 12°30′34″N 77°07′22″E
- Country: India
- State: Karnataka
- District: Mandya
- Time zone: UTC+5:30 (IST)
- Vehicle registration: KA

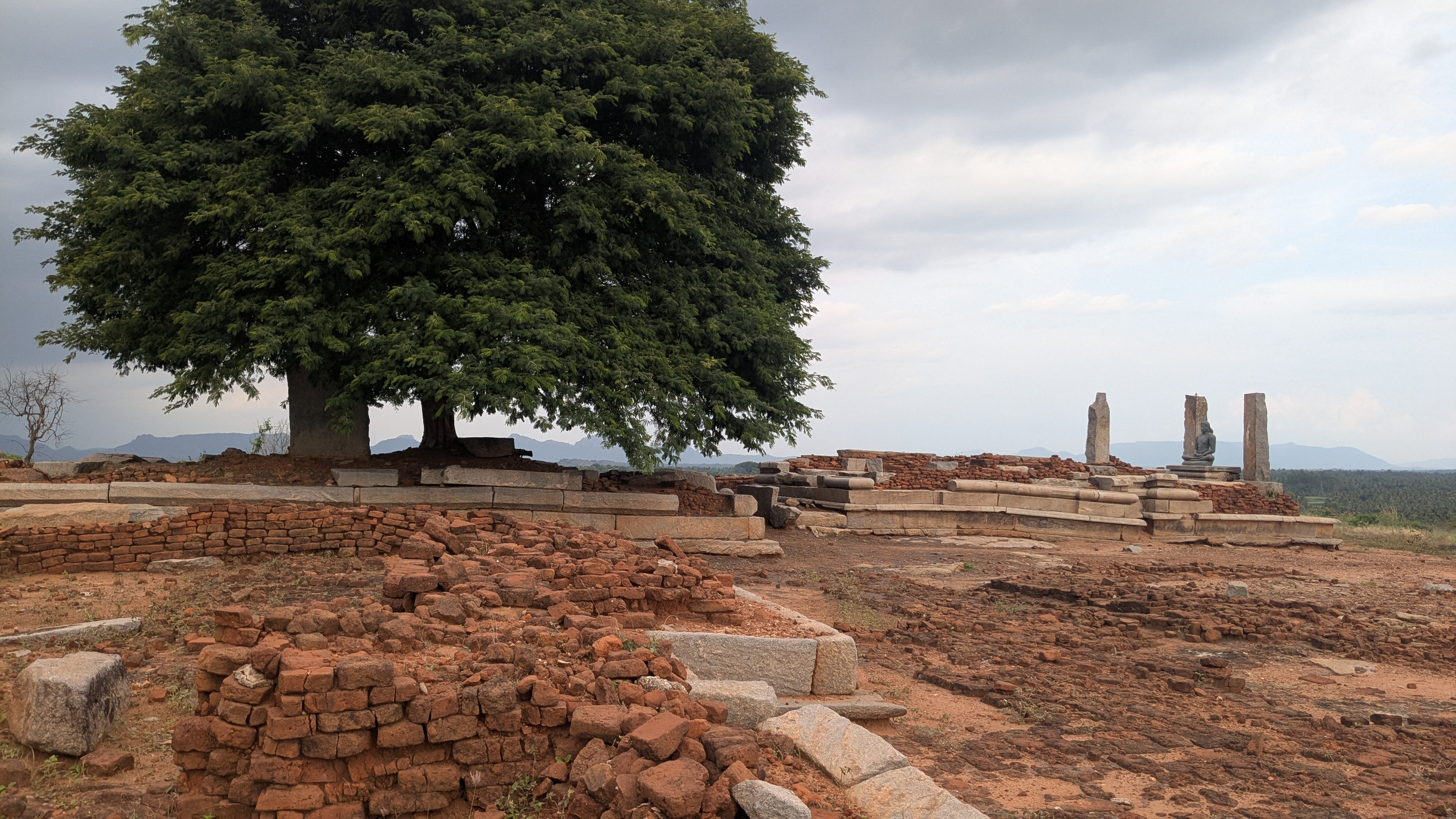
Ganga Dynasty’s Jain architectural legacy in Karnataka.

Aretippur is an ancient Jain heritage site located in the Mandya district of Karnataka, India. Situated on the rocky hillock of "Kumbhi Betta", it houses multiple Jain monuments and inscriptions dating back to the Western Ganga dynasty (circa 8th–10th century CE). The site is sometimes referred to as the "second Shravanabelagola" due to its cultural importance and Jain relics.

== Location ==
Aretippur is located near Kokkarebellur village, about 6 km from Maddur and approximately 70 km from Bengaluru. It lies along the banks of the Shimsha River, a tributary of the Kaveri, and is accessible by road from Maddur or Malavalli. The site is situated atop "Kumbhi Betta", a granite hill filled with Jain sculptures.

== History ==
The history of Aretippur dates back to the 8th–10th centuries (Common Era), when it emerged as a prominent Jain religious center under the patronage of the Western Ganga dynasty. The Gangas, known for their devotion to Jainism, supported the construction of temples (basadis), monolithic sculptures, and monastery spaces in and around Aretippur. The hill known today as "Kumbhi Betta" housed multiple Jain monks, many of whom engaged in spiritual practices such as meditation and Sallekhana (ritual death by fasting).

Inscriptions discovered on the site, and published in the Epigraphia Carnatica, reveal that Aretippur (referred to as Aretippura or Arittippura in some inscriptions) received endowments from local chieftains and wealthy Jain households. These grants were used for temple construction, installation of Tirthankara images, and feeding of Jain monks.

Scholars believe that Aretippur may have served as a secondary Jain pilgrimage site in Karnataka, closely associated with the larger center of Shravanabelagola, which was also under Ganga influence. The similarity in iconographic styles—particularly the Bahubali (Gommateshwara) statue at Aretippur—suggests that the artistic tradition was carried over by the same sculptor guilds operating under Ganga patronage.

By the 12th century, the prominence of Aretippur declined, possibly due to changing dynastic patronage and the rise of Shaiva and Vaishnava traditions in the region. However, its historical and religious significance remains preserved in the rock art, inscriptions, and ruins scattered across Kumbhi Betta.

== Monuments and architecture ==
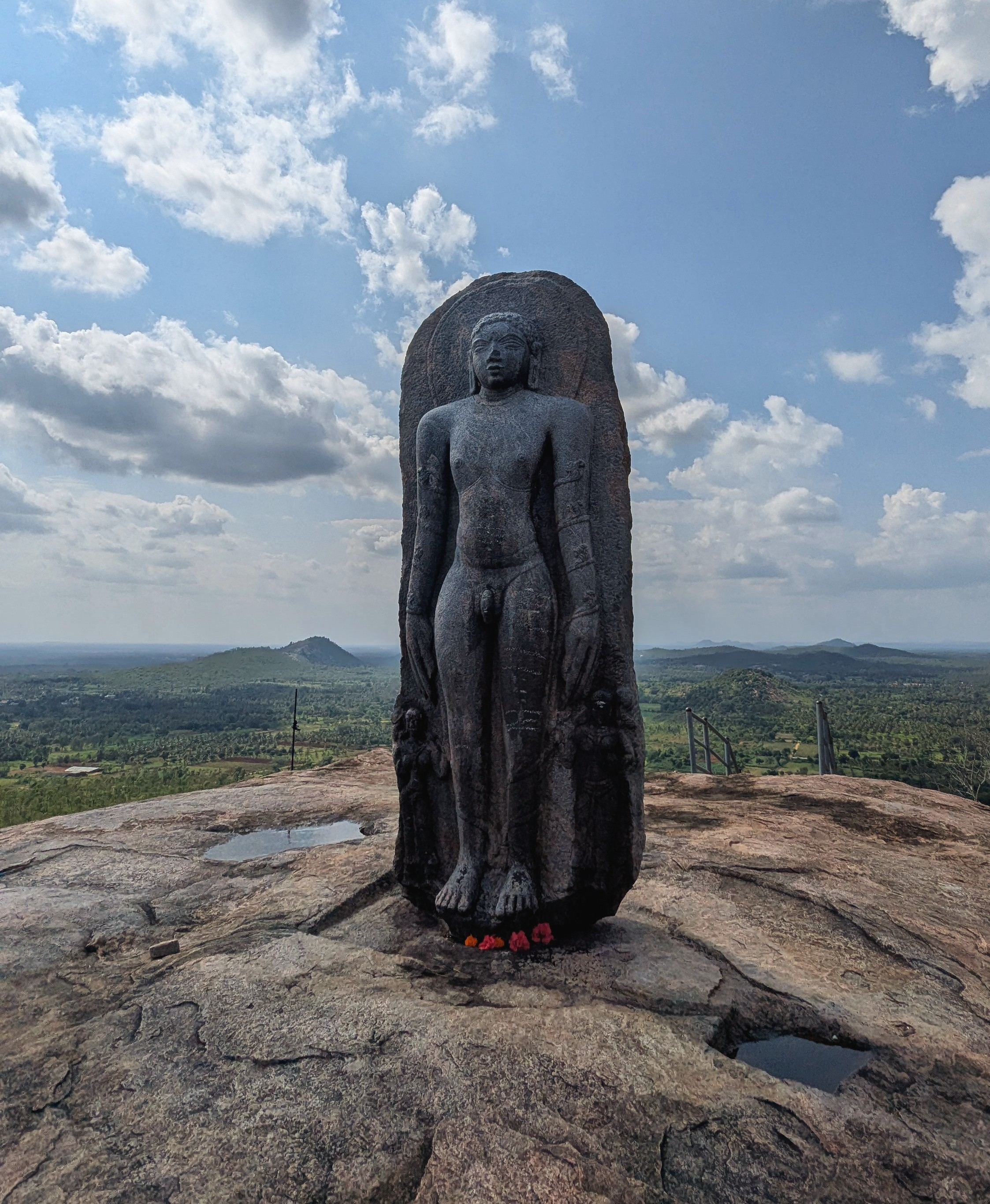
Statue Of Bahubali Aretippur (Gangas Monument)

The hill of Aretippur features:

- A large monolithic image of Bahubali (Gommateshwara), resembling the style seen in Shravanabelagola and Karkala.
- Several carvings of Tirthankaras, including Rishabhanatha, Parshvanatha, and Neminatha, sculpted directly onto the rock surface.
- The remains of "stone basadis", sanctums, and mandapas, indicating the site's religious and ritualistic importance.
- Natural caves used by Jain ascetics for meditation and residence.

== Inscriptions and literature ==
Aretippur is mentioned in multiple inscriptions found on-site, which are documented in the "Epigraphia Carnatica". These inscriptions, mostly in old Kannada and Sanskrit, refer to temple grants, donations from local chieftains, and Jain religious activities.

One inscription dated to the 10th century CE mentions a grant to a Jain monk and the installation of a Tirthankara image.

== Religious importance ==
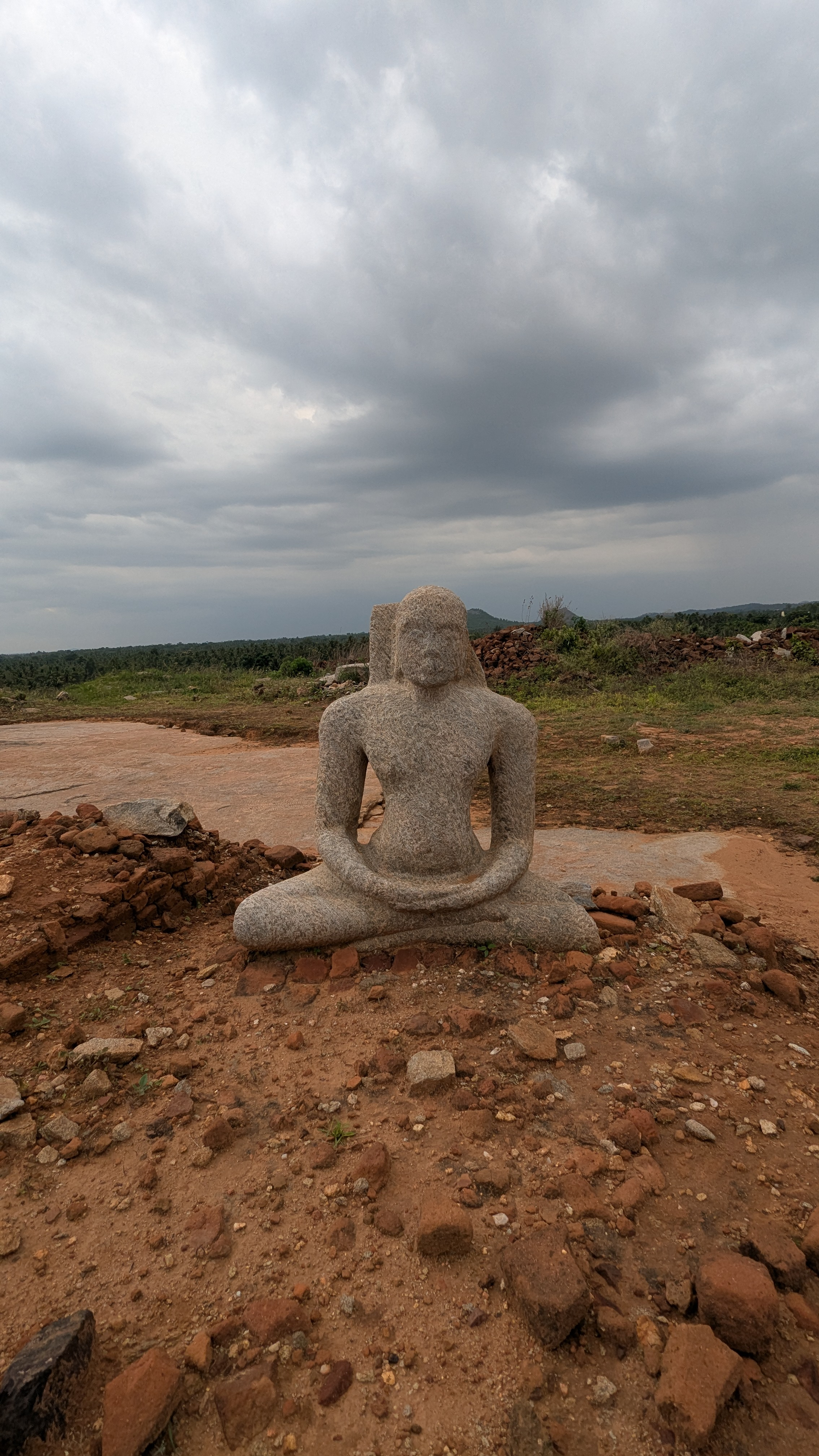
Jain Statue at Aretippur, part of the Western Ganga Dynasty’s Jain architectural legacy in Karnataka.

Aretippur was a vital pilgrimage site for "Digambara Jain monks" and lay followers. The abundance of rock-carved Tirthankaras and Bahubali icons indicates regular use of the site for worship, monastic vows, and possibly Sallekhana (ritual fasting unto death), which was common among Jain ascetics during that era.

== Current status ==
Although the site is not as widely known as Shravanabelagola, it has gained attention from the Karnataka State Department of Archaeology, which has undertaken limited conservation efforts. Several carvings remain exposed to the elements, and scholars advocate for better protection and tourism infrastructure to preserve Aretippur’s heritage.

== See also ==
- Shravanabelagola
- Kambadahalli
- Ganga dynasty
- Jainism in Karnataka
