= Panchakuta Basadi, Kambadahalli =

Temple complex in Karnataka, India

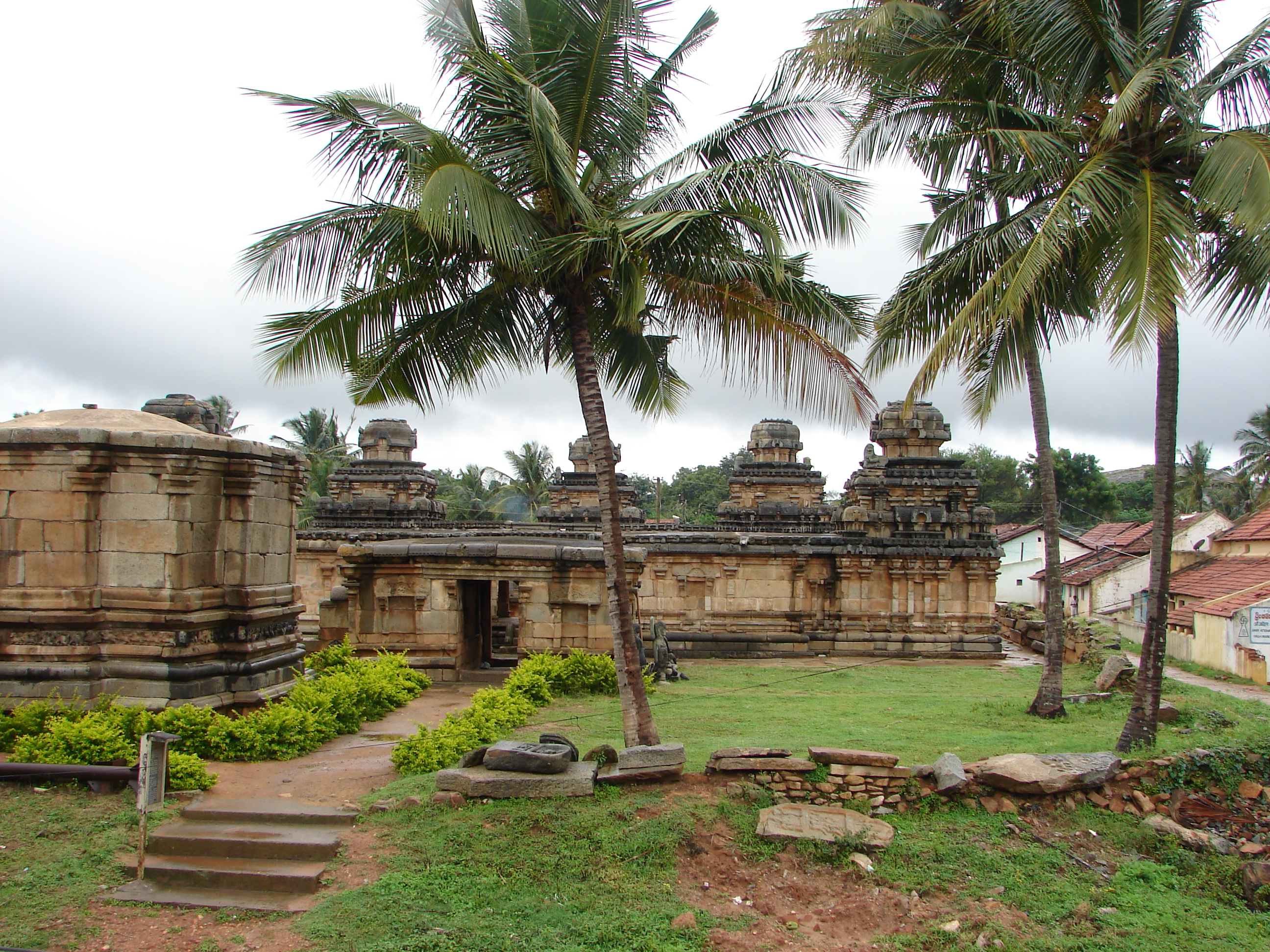
- Panchakuta Basadi, Kambadahalli

Religion
- Affiliation: Jainism
- Deity: Adinatha
- Festival: Mahavir Janma Kalyanak

Location
- Location: Kambadahalli, Mandya
- State: Karnataka
- Country: India
- Interactive map of Panchakuta Basadi, Kambadahalli
- Coordinates: 12°52′03.6″N 76°38′00.8″E

Architecture
- Established: 8th-10th century AD

Panchakuta Basadi (or Panchakoota Basadi) is a Jain temple complex located in the Kambadahalli village of the Mandya district in the Karnataka state of Southern India.

Panchakuta Basadi is often described as one of the finest examples of the Western Ganga variety of Dravidian architecture, related to the Jain faith and iconography.

== History ==
According to the historian K.R. Srinivasan, the temple complex, which was built by the kings of the Western Ganga Dynasty is assignable to the period 900–1000 CE. The historian I. K. Sarma however assigns an earlier date of 8th century, based on traces of early Pallava-Pandya and Chalukya-Pallava influences. Kambadahalli (whose name in the Kannada language literally translates to "village with pillar") which is located 18 km from the famous Jain heritage town of Shravanabelagola, on the Mandya-Shravanabelagola highway, gets its name from the Brahmadeva pillar (Manasthambha) erected in front of the temple complex. From inscriptions, it is known that the temple complex has been renovated during later centuries, including the during the rule of the Hoysala Empire. The monument is protected by the Archaeological Survey of India as a "national monument". Srinivasan describes it as a "landmark in South India architecture".

== Architecture ==
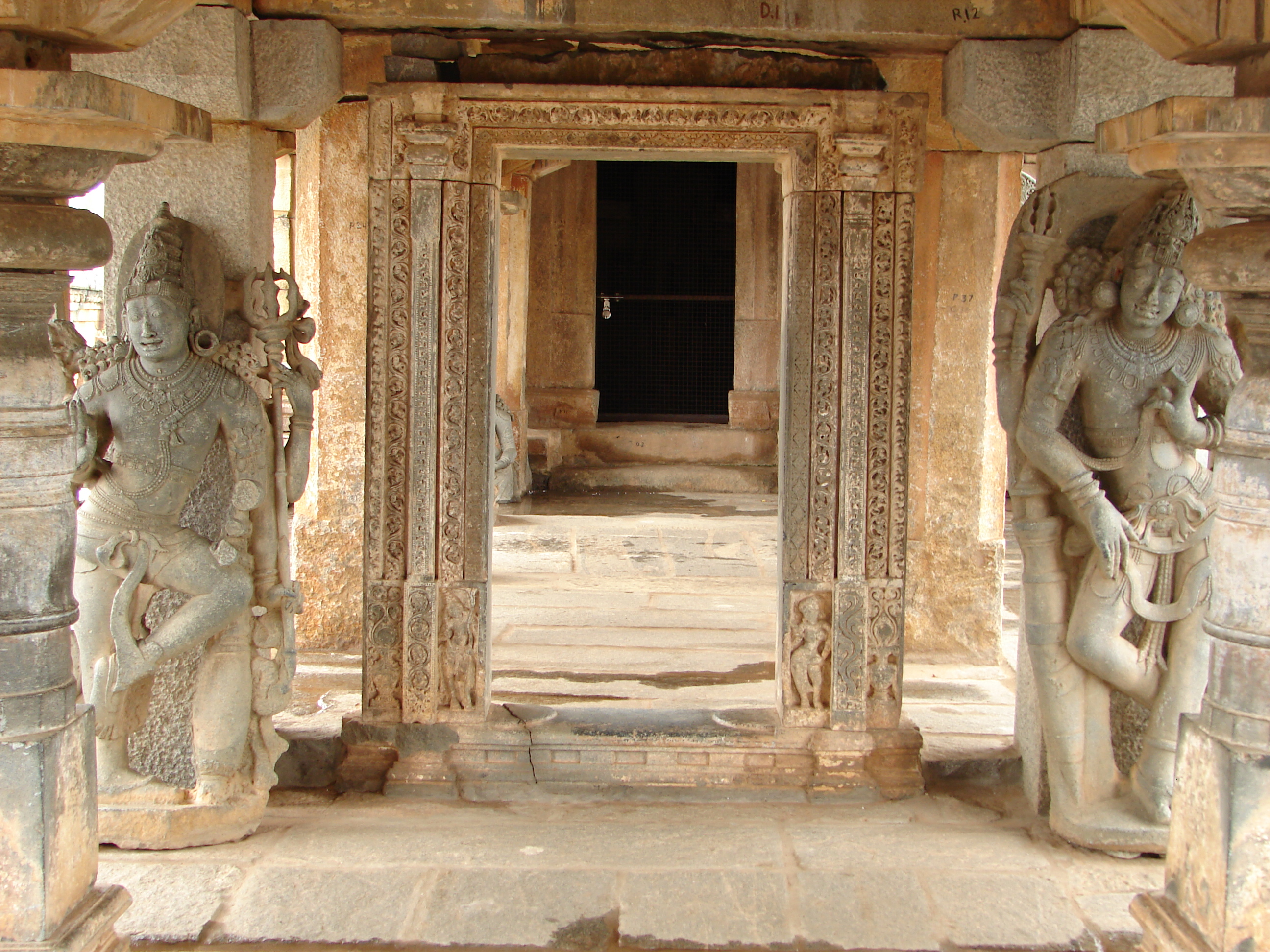
An open mantapa (hall), Panchakuta Basadi, Kambadahalli, Mandya District

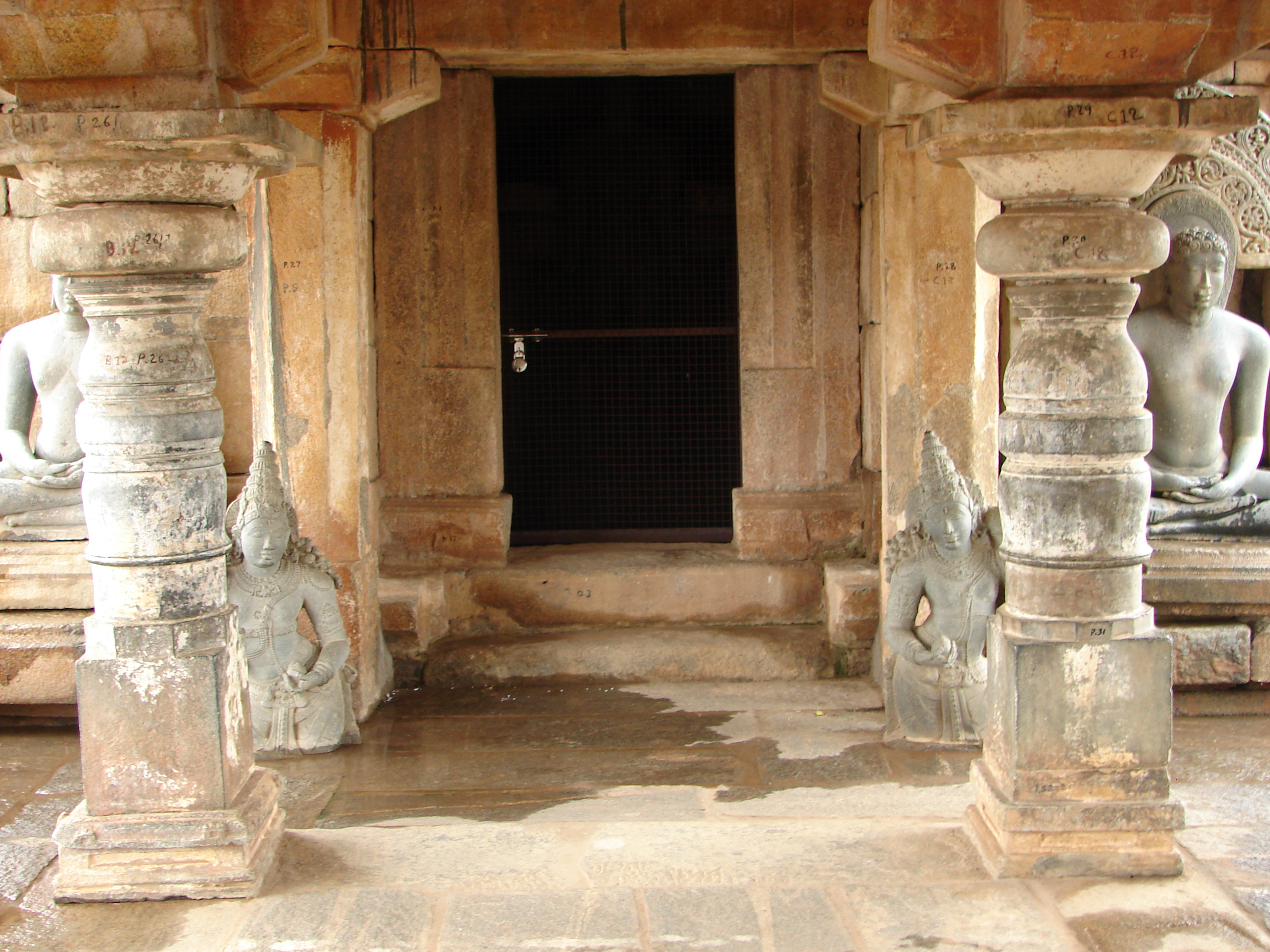
An open mantapa, Panchakuta Basadi, Kambadahalli, Mandya District

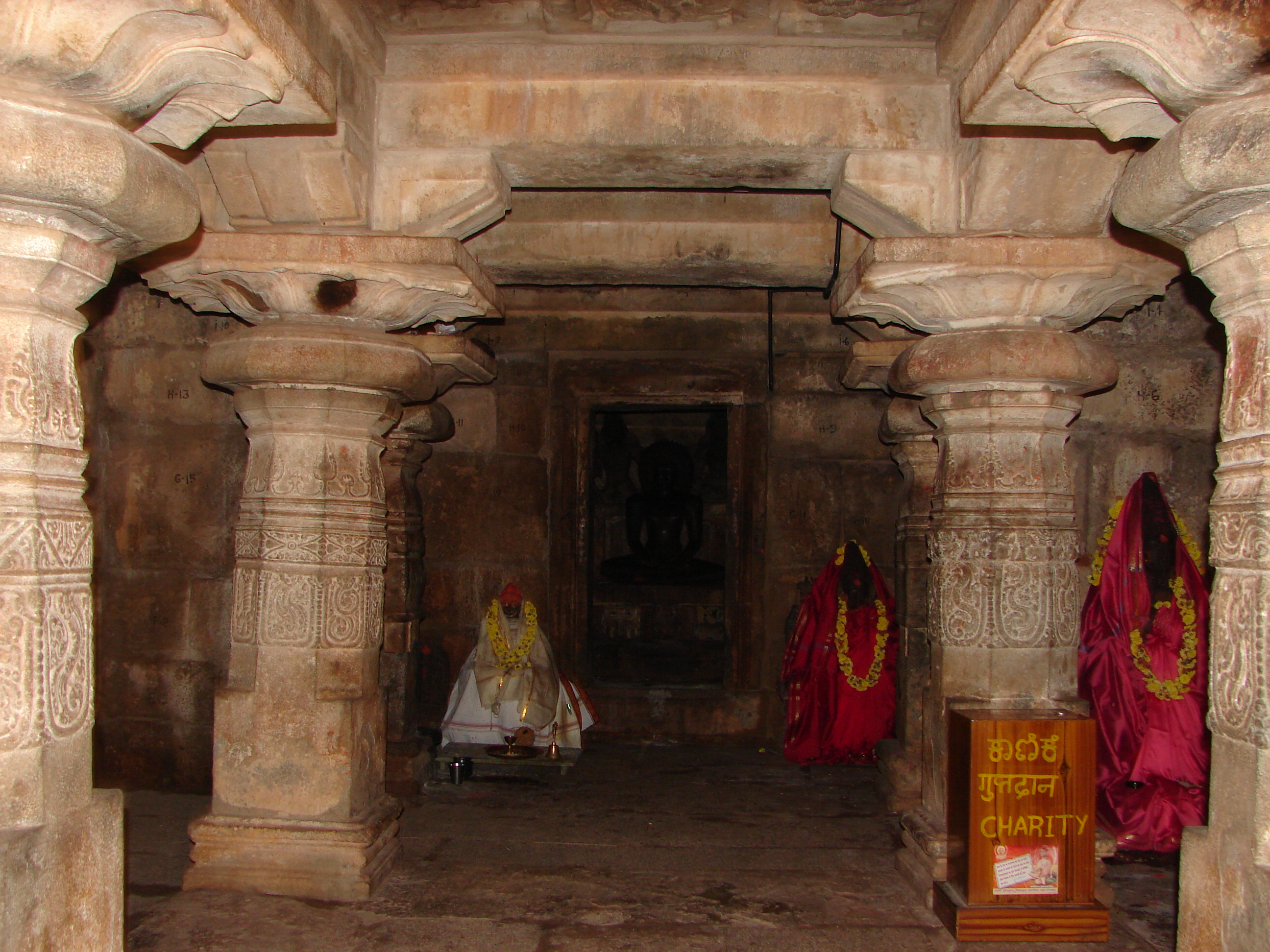
A closed mantapa with ornate Ganga style pillars at Panchakuta Basadi, Kambadahalli, Mandya District

The temple was built in two phases. In the first phase, three shrines were constructed (trikutachala, three shrines each with a superstructure). The central shrine faces north, one shrine faces west and the other face east. The central shrine has a square superstructure (Shikhara) called Brahmachhanda girva-shikhara. The west and east facing shrines have superstructures called the Rudrachhanda griva-shikhara and Vishnuchhanda griva-shikhara respectively. The design of the superstructures speaks of the artistic taste of the builders. They are three-dimensional, with the first tier (tala) measuring a third of the total height of the tower, and the second tier measuring one half the height of the first. Each of the three shrines have individual vestibules (or half hall or ardhamantapa) which open to a large common open hall called the mahamantapa or navaranga, whose ceiling is supported by four ornate central pillars. At the entrance to the shrines (bilpitha) are the guardians to the "eight directions"(ashtadikpalaka; ashta - "eight", dik - "directions", palaka - "keeper") with their consorts and vehicles (vahana)

The entire complex is oriented towards the impressive Brahmadeva pillar and faces north. The main central shrine houses the image of Adhinatha, the first Jain tirthankara (Teaching God). The west (right) and east (left) facing shrines have the images of later day tirthankaras, Shantinatha and Neminatha respectively. The images appear to be of well-polished steatite material and could be later day replacements. According to Robert J Del Bonto who conducted research at the site, the two shrines that form the later day additions are a twin construction, are lateral (face each other), have individual vestibule and a closed mantapa (hall) and open into a common open pillared porch (open mantapa). The art critic M.H. Dhaky calls them as "Shantinatha Basadi" and regards them a good example of the "terminal" stage in Western Ganga art. The temple exhibits fine sculptures of Jain Yakshas (male benevolent spirits) and Yakshis (their female counterparts) of the Western Ganga and Hoysala periods.

According to the art critic and historian S. Settar, generally, Brahmadeva pillars found in front of ancient Jain temples do not house sculptures of the Brahma Yaksha or the god Brahma, rather they find their origins in the Manasthambha (sthambha lit, "pillar") and have images of the Sarvanubhuti Yaksha. The base of this pillar is square and exhibits looped garland decorations, and at the top supports a two handed seated image of east facing Siddhayika. The overall composition of the temple, according to Sarma, is one of "clarity in structure and function" without any emphasis on over decoration.

== Gallery ==
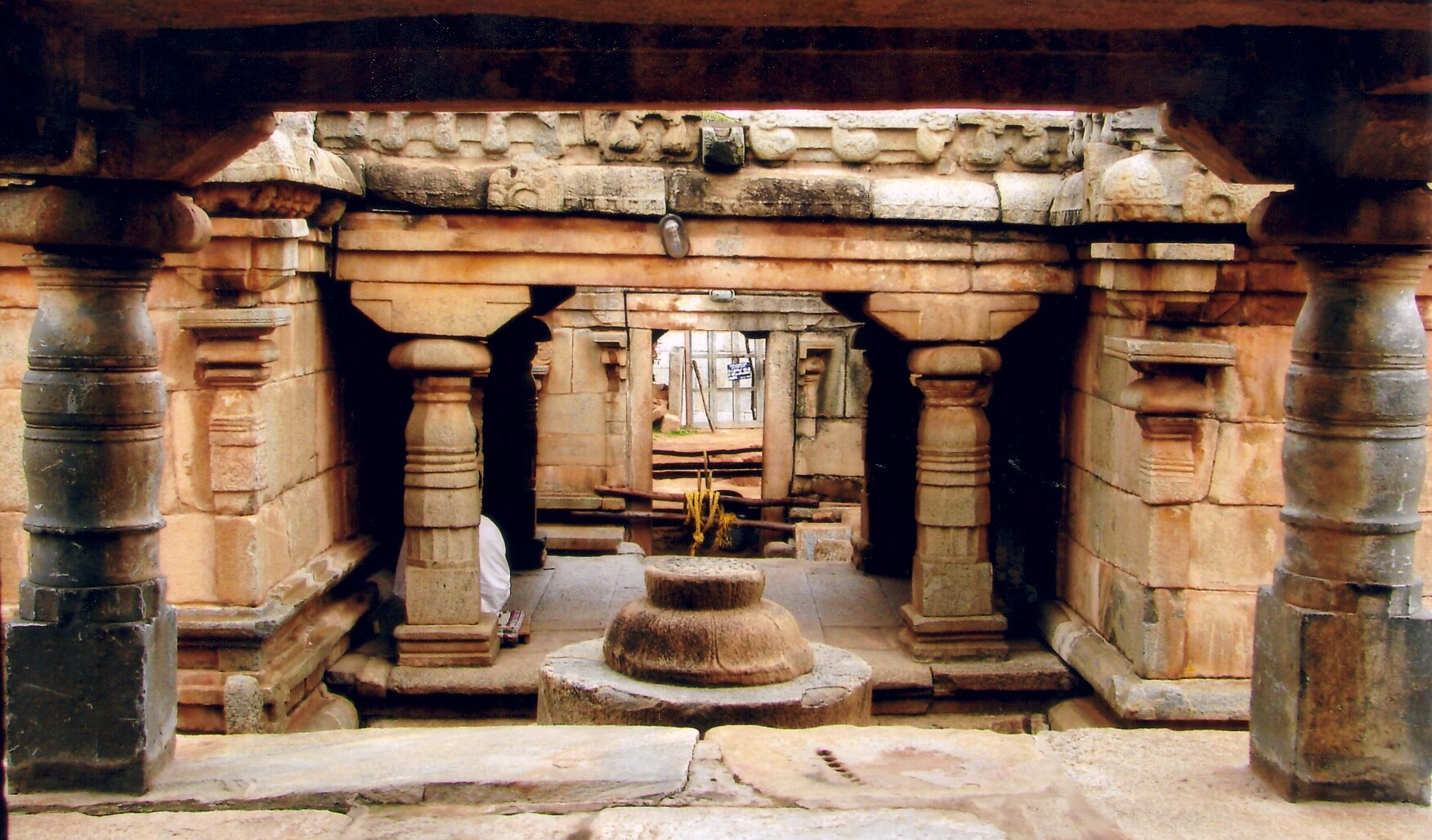
Mantapa (hall), Panchakuta Basadi, Kambadahalli

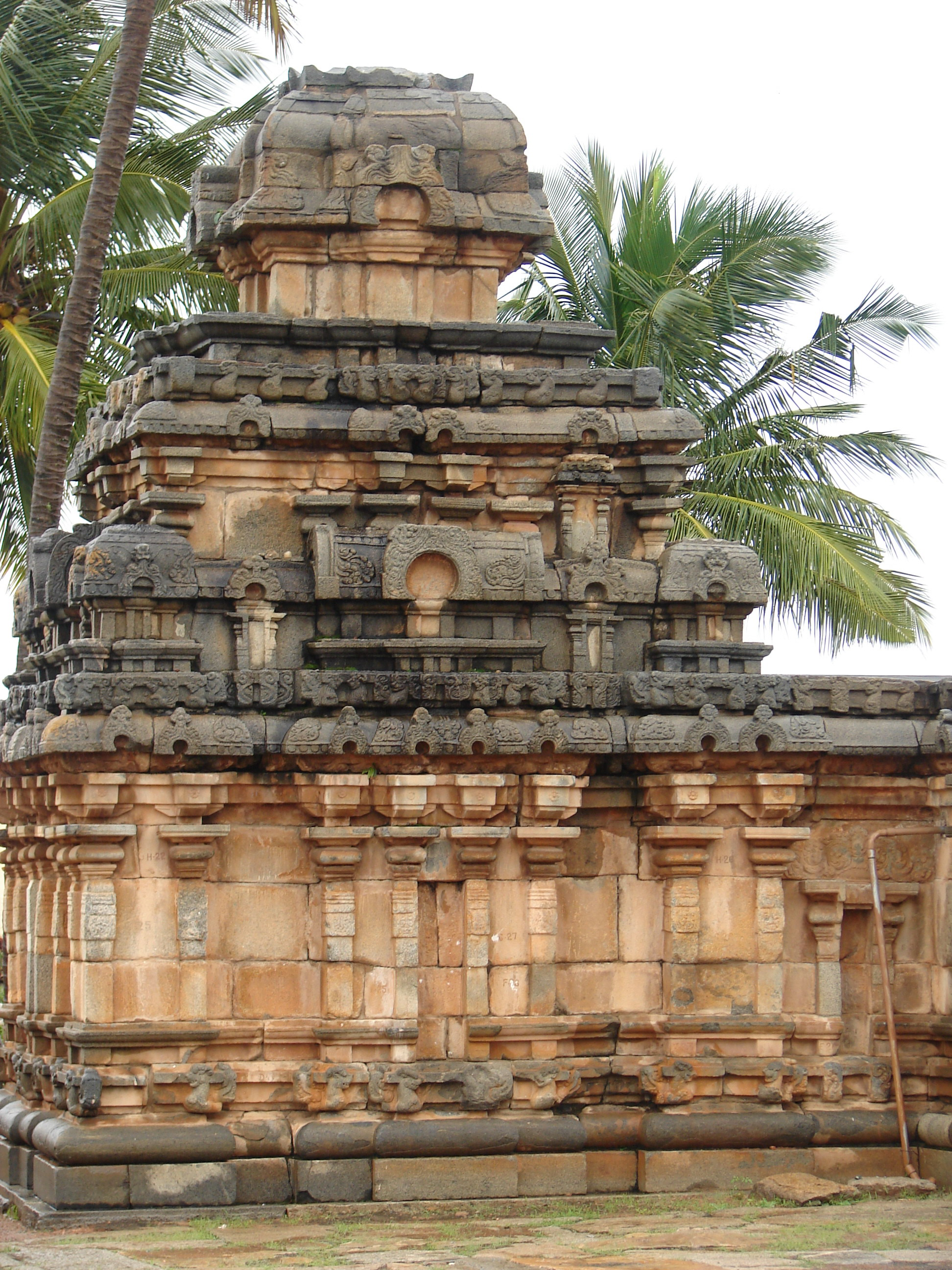
A typical Dravidian style shrine at Panchakuta Basadi, Kambadahalli

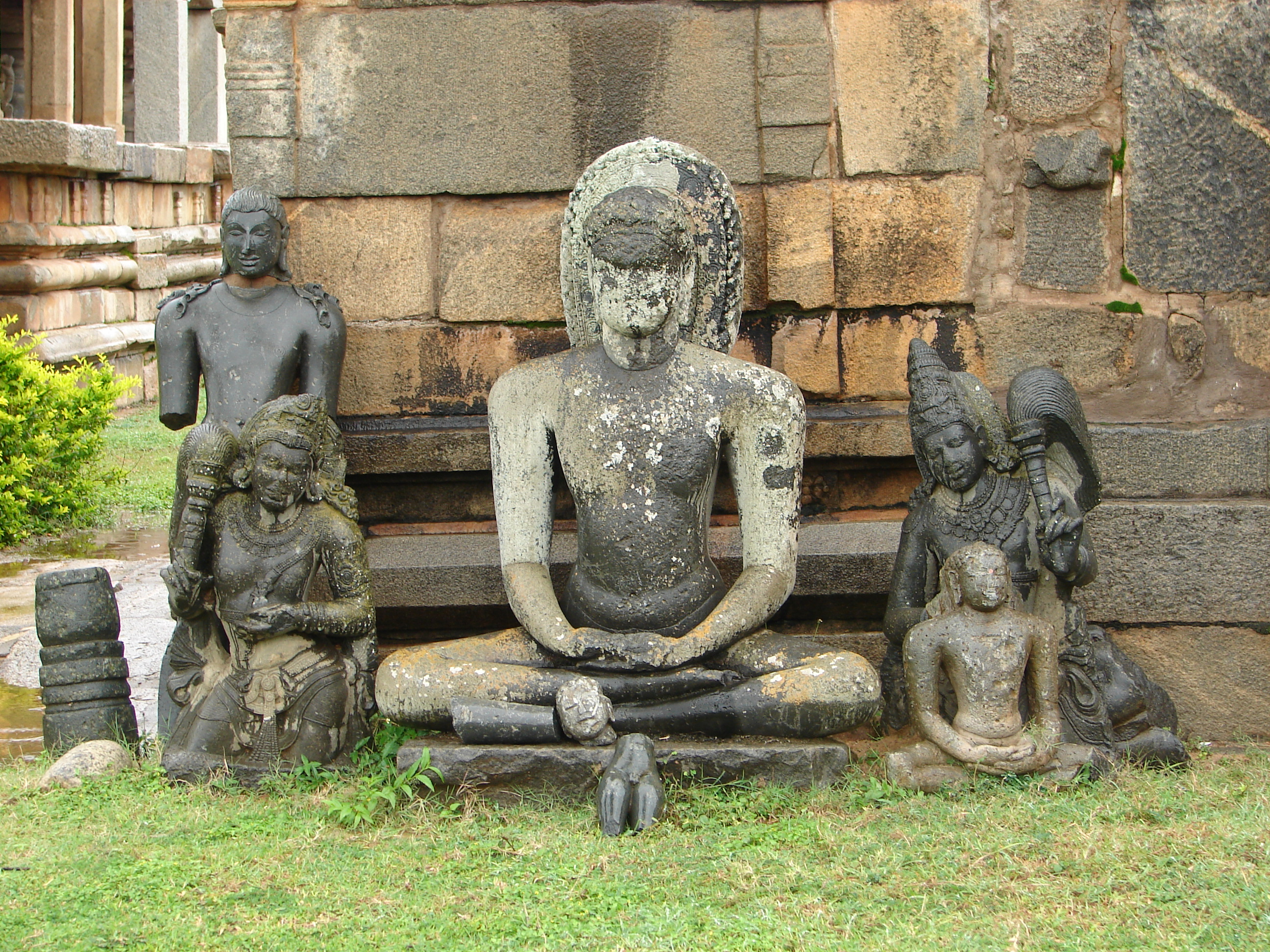
Excavated Jain sculptures from the 9th-10th century at Panchakuta Basadi, Kambadahalli

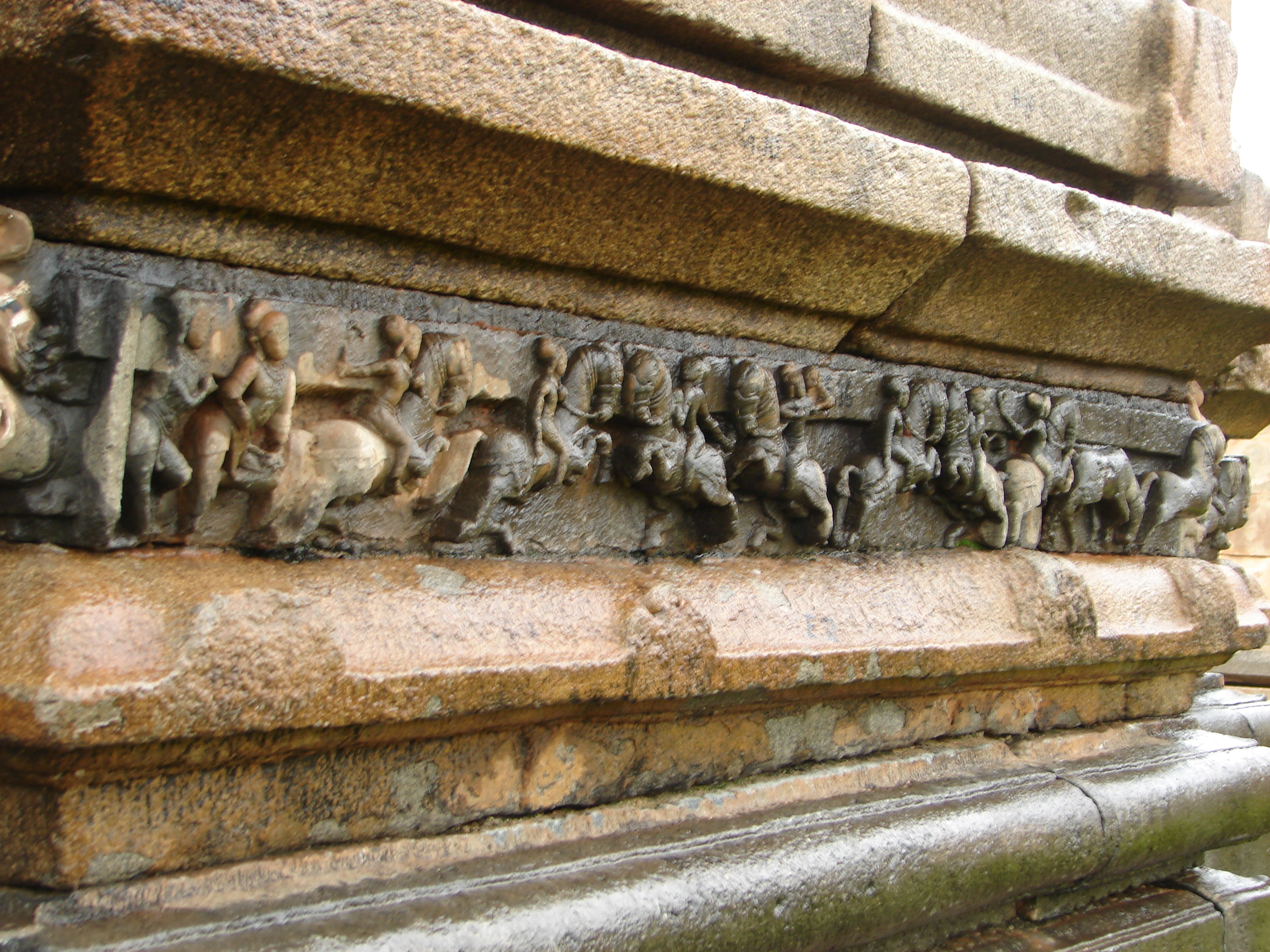
Bas-relief depicting horse men at Panchakuta Basadi, Kambadahalli

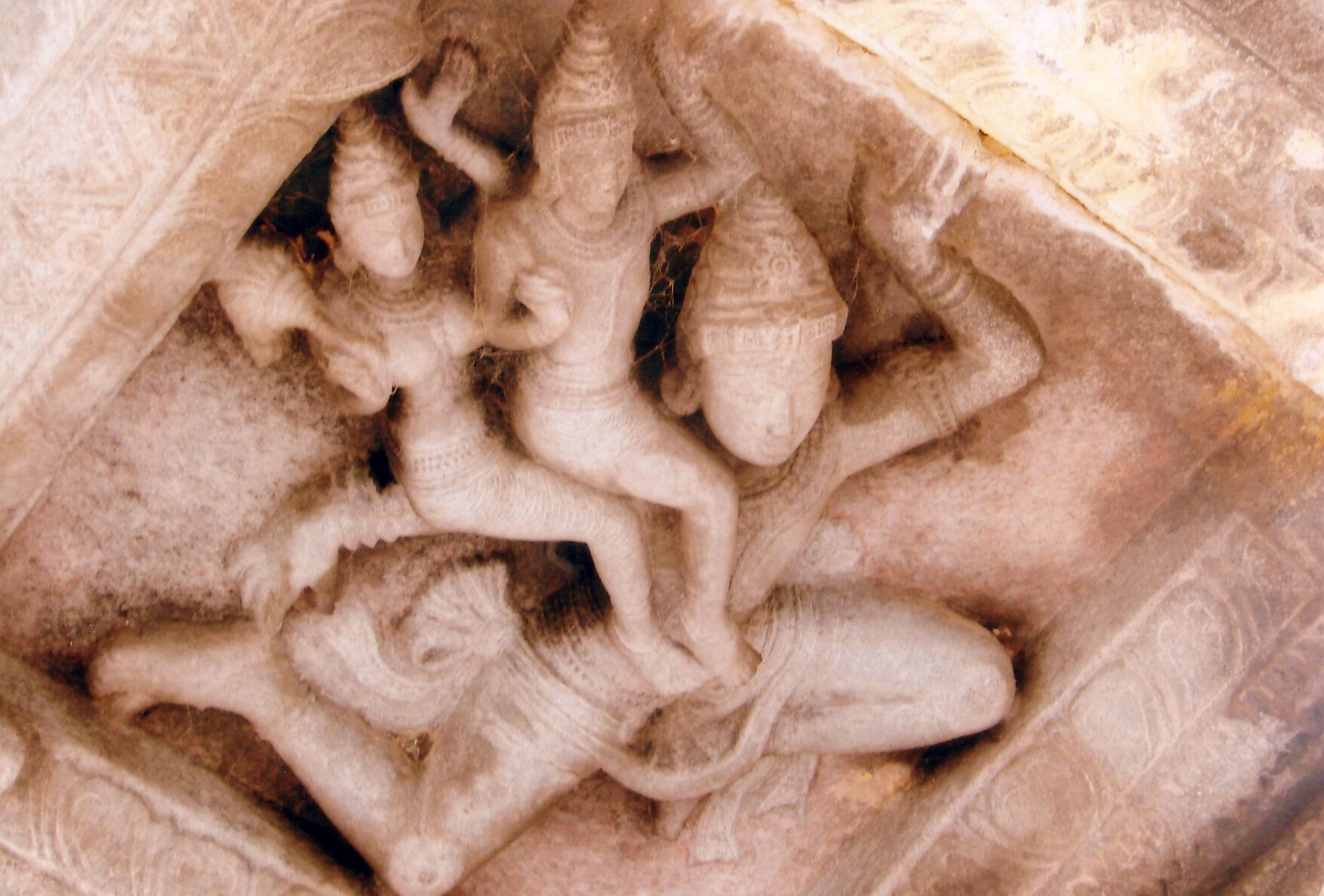
Ceiling sculpture, Panchakuta

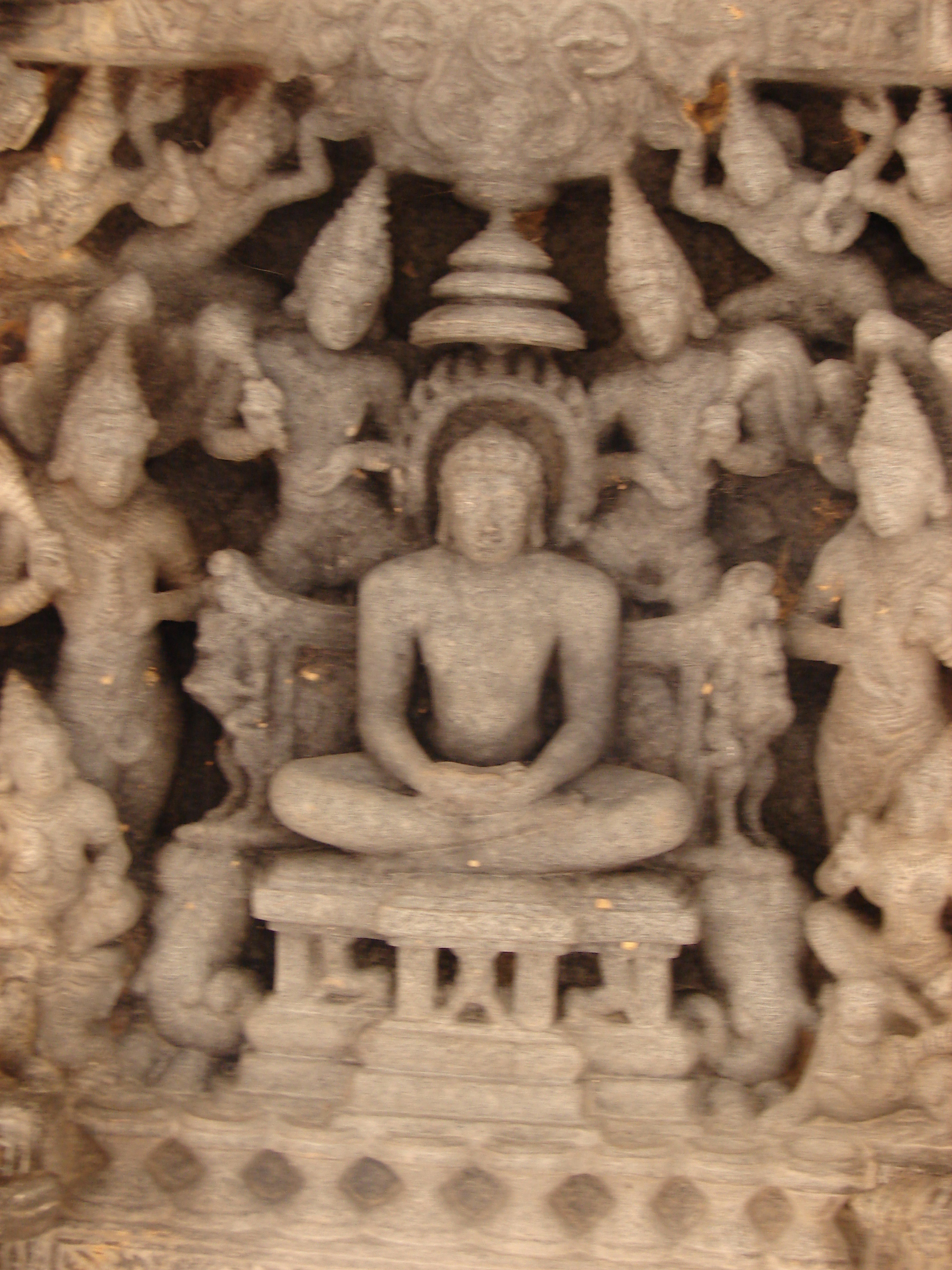
Tirthankar sculpture on the ceiling, Panchakuta Basadi, Kambadahalli

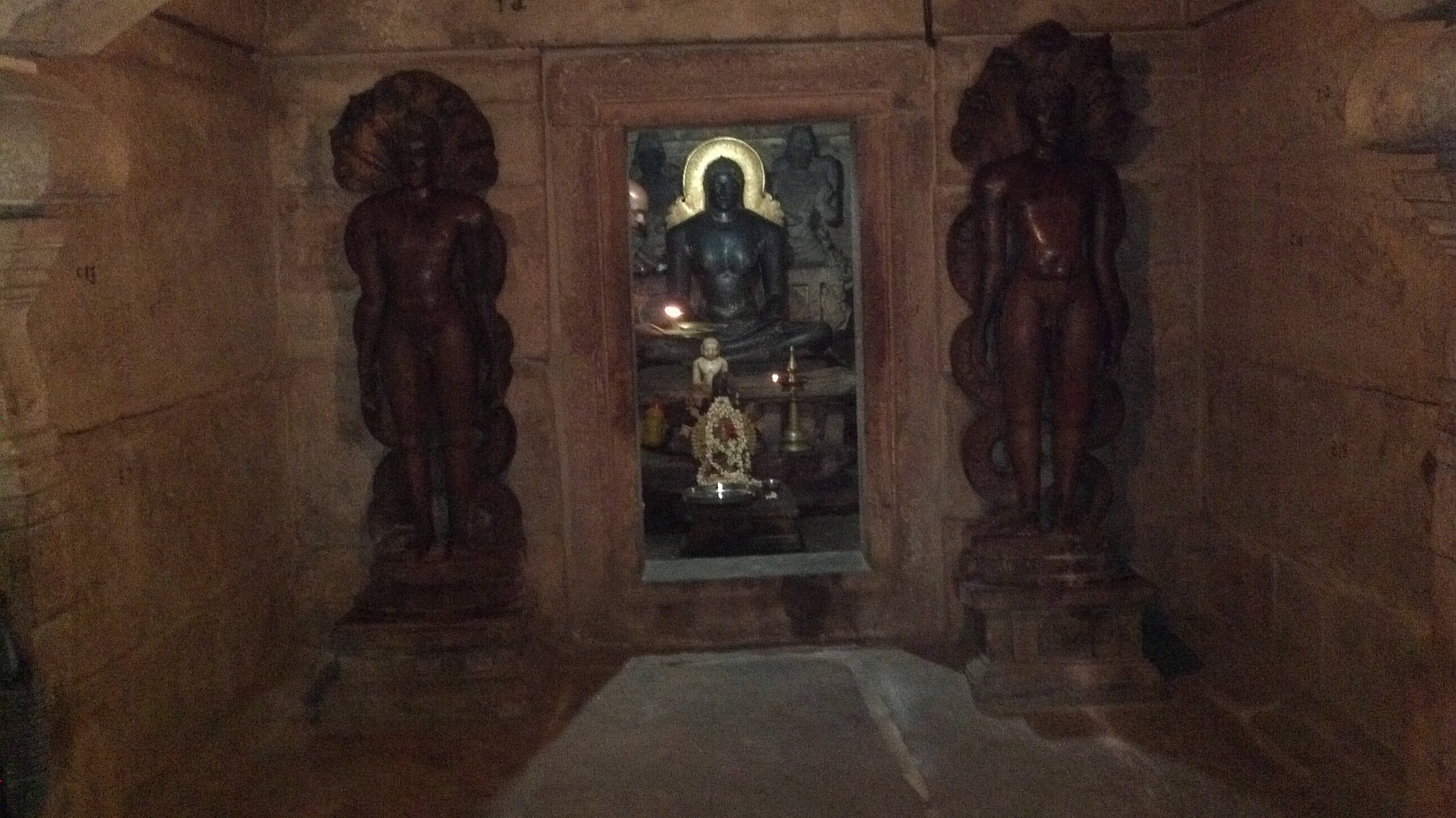
A sanctum in the Panchakuta Basadi, Kambadahalli with image of the tirthankar Adinatha

== See also ==
- Jainism in Karnataka
- Jainism in north Karnataka
- Jainism in Tulu Nadu
- Shravanabelagola
