= List of Monuments of National Importance in Bangalore circle =

This is a list of Monuments of National Importance (ASI) as officially recognized by and available through the website of the Archaeological Survey of India in the Indian state Karnataka (Bengaluru circle). 207 Monuments of National Importance have been recognized by the ASI in Bengaluru circle of Karnataka.

== List of monuments ==
SL. No.	Description	Location	Address	District	Coordinates	Image
N-KA-B1	Old Dungeon Fort & Gates	Bangaluru		Bangaluru	12°57′46″N 77°34′33″E	Old Dungeon Fort & Gates More images
N-KA-B2	Tipu Sultan's Palace	Bangaluru		Bangaluru	12°57′34″N 77°34′25″E	Tipu Sultan's Palace More images
N-KA-B3	Pre-Historic Site	Chikajal		Bangaluru		Pre-Historic Site
N-KA-B4	Devanahalli Fort	Devanahalli		Bangaluru	13°14′58″N 77°42′33″E	Devanahalli Fort More images
N-KA-B5	Tipu Sultan's Birth; Place	Devanahalli		Bangaluru	13°14′47″N 77°42′26″E	Tipu Sultan's Birth Place More images
N-KA-B6	Pre-Historic Site	Hajjala		Ramnagar		Upload Photo
N-KA-B7	Pre-Historic Site	Managondana halli		Bangaluru		Upload Photo
N-KA-B8	Pre-Historic Site	Savanadurga		Ramnagar		Pre-Historic Site
N-KA-B9	Kalleswara Swami Temple	Ambali		Vijayanagara	14°54′08″N 76°10′35″E	Kalleswara Swami Temple More images
N-KA-B10	Hampi Ruins and Ananthasayana Temple	Ananthasayana gudi		Vijayanagara	15°16′40″N 76°24′27″E	Hampi Ruins and Ananthasayana Temple More images
N-KA-B11	Kalleswara Swami Temple	Angoor		Vijayanagara	14°57′18″N 75°45′22″E	Upload Photo
N-KA-B12	Upper Fort and Citadel and Nagalacheruva	Ballary		Ballary	15°08′54″N 76°54′39″E	Upper Fort and Citadel and Nagalacheruva More images
N-KA-B13	Group of Jain Temples on the Hemakuta hill	Hampi	Hemakuta Hill	Vijayanagara	15°20′02″N 76°27′32″E	Group of Jain Temples on the Hemakuta hill More images
N-KA-B14	Kadalekalu Ganesa Temple	Hampi		Vijayanagara	15°19′58″N 76°27′40″E	Kadalekalu Ganesa Temple More images
N-KA-B15	Monolithic Bull	Hampi		Vijayanagara	15°20′02″N 76°28′01″E	Monolithic Bull More images
N-KA-B16	Sasivekalu Ganesha Temple	Hampi		Vijayanagara	15°19′53″N 76°27′36″E	Sasivekalu Ganesha Temple More images
N-KA-B17	Virupaksha Temple	Hampi		Vijayanagara	15°20′07″N 76°27′31″E	Virupaksha Temple More images
N-KA-B18	Kalleshwara Temple, Hire Hadagali	Hire Hadagali		Vijayanagara	14°55′24″N 75°49′44″E	Kalleshwara Temple, Hire Hadagali More images
N-KA-B19	Kalleswara Swami Temple	Hoovina Hadagali		Vijayanagara	15°01′22″N 75°55′52″E	Upload Photo
N-KA-B20	Chandikeswara Temple & Group of Sati Memorials	Kederampura		Vijayanagara	15°19′35″N 76°27′36″E	Chandikeswara Temple & Group of Sati Memorials
N-KA-B21	Saraswati Temple	Kederampura		Vijayanagara	15°18′55″N 76°28′28″E	Saraswati Temple More images
N-KA-B22	Naggarakhana (Band) tower in Dandnayak's enclosure	Kamalapuram		Vijayanagara	15°19′01″N 76°28′01″E	Naggarakhana (Band) tower in Dandnayak's enclosure More images
N-KA-B23	Basement of a Large Ruined building opposite to Muhammadan Mosque and also the Platform Northeast of Dandnayak's enclosure	Kamalapuram		Vijayanagara	15°19′07″N 76°28′03″E	Basement of a Large Ruined building opposite to Muhammadan Mosque and also the Platform Northeast of Dandnayak's enclosure
N-KA-B24-a	Basement of a Palace near small underground shrine chamber	Kamalapuram		Vijayanagara	15°18′56″N 76°28′12″E	Basement of a Palace near small underground shrine chamber
N-KA-B24-b	Basement of a Palace in Dandnayak's enclosure	Kamalapuram		Vijayanagara	15°19′02″N 76°27′59″E	Basement of a Palace in Dandnayak's enclosure
N-KA-B25	Basement of Queen's Palace in Zanana enclosure	Kamalapuram		Vijayanagara	15°19′15″N 76°28′15″E	Basement of Queen's Palace in Zanana enclosure
N-KA-B26	Bhima's Gateway to East of Ganigiti Jain Temple	Kamalapuram		Vijayanagara	15°18′46″N 76°28′49″E	Bhima's Gateway to East of Ganigiti Jain Temple More images
N-KA-B27	Bhojansala of Pilgrims Feeding Place near the Octagonal Pavilion on the Hampiroad	Kamalapuram		Vijayanagara	15°18′51″N 76°28′06″E	Bhojansala of Pilgrims Feeding Place near the Octagonal Pavilion on the Hampiroad
N-KA-B28	Chanderasekara Temple	Kamalapuram		Vijayanagara	15°18′49″N 76°28′28″E	Chanderasekara Temple More images
N-KA-B29	Domed Gateway to the East of the Citadel	Kamalapuram		Vijayanagara	15°18′34″N 76°29′08″E	Domed Gateway to the East of the Citadel
N-KA-B30-a	i) Elephant's Stable	Kamalapuram		Vijayanagara	15°19′16″N 76°28′22″E	i) Elephant's Stable More images
N-KA-B30-b	ii)Guards House close to Elephant's Stable	Kamalapuram		Vijayanagara	15°19′18″N 76°28′20″E	ii)Guards House close to Elephant's Stable More images
N-KA-B31-a	i)Hazara Ramachandra Temple	Kamalapuram		Vijayanagara	15°19′04″N 76°28′08″E	i)Hazara Ramachandra Temple More images
N-KA-B31-b	ii) Basement of King's Audience Hall	Kamalapuram		Vijayanagara	15°18′59″N 76°28′09″E	ii) Basement of King's Audience Hall More images
N-KA-B31-c	iii) Throne Platform	Kamalapuram		Vijayanagara	15°18′57″N 76°28′15″E	iii) Throne Platform More images
N-KA-B32	Jain temple with inscriptions North East of Elephant's Stable	Kamalapuram		Vijayanagara	15°19′14″N 76°28′27″E	Jain temple with inscriptions North East of Elephant's Stable More images
N-KA-B33	Gnanagitte Jaina Temple	Kamalapuram		Vijayanagara	15°18′49″N 76°28′41″E	Gnanagitte Jaina Temple More images
N-KA-B34	Large Public Bath or Tank	Kamalapuram		Vijayanagara	15°18′52″N 76°28′14″E	Large Public Bath or Tank
N-KA-B35-a	i)Large Stone Trough	Kamalapuram		Vijayanagara	15°19′02″N 76°28′09″E	i)Large Stone Trough
N-KA-B35-b	ii) Large Stone Door	Kamalapuram		Vijayanagara	15°18′59″N 76°28′16″E	ii) Large Stone Door
N-KA-B35-c	iii) Stone Aqueduct & Small Underground Shrine Chamber	Kamalapuram		Vijayanagara		iii) Stone Aqueduct & Small Underground Shrine Chamber
N-KA-B36	Large Underground Temple	Kamalapuram		Vijayanagara	15°19′04″N 76°27′51″E	Large Underground Temple More images
N-KA-B37	Lotus Mahal Pavilion	Kamalapuram		Vijayanagara	15°19′13″N 76°28′17″E	Lotus Mahal Pavilion More images
N-KA-B38	Mosque in Dandnaik's enclosure	Kamalapuram		Vijayanagara	15°19′01″N 76°28′02″E	Mosque in Dandnaik's enclosure More images
N-KA-B39	Muhammadan tomb & Dargah on the Road to Hospet from Kamalapuram	Kamalapuram		Vijayanagara	15°18′38″N 76°26′56″E	Muhammadan tomb & Dargah on the Road to Hospet from Kamalapuram More images
N-KA-B40	Muhammadan Watch tower in Dandnaik's Enclosure	Kamalapuram		Vijayanagara	15°19′07″N 76°27′58″E	Muhammadan Watch tower in Dandnaik's Enclosure
N-KA-B41	North Watch Tower in the Zenana Enclosure	Kamalapuram		Vijayanagara	15°19′17″N 76°28′14″E	North Watch Tower in the Zenana Enclosure
N-KA-B42	Octagonal Bath	Kamalapuram		Vijayanagara	15°18′56″N 76°28′32″E	Octagonal Bath More images
N-KA-B43	Octagonal Water Pavilion	Kamalapuram		Vijayanagara	15°18′52″N 76°28′05″E	Octagonal Water Pavilion More images
N-KA-B44	Old Water Supply Scheme	Kamalapuram		Vijayanagara	15°18′55″N 76°28′14″E	Old Water Supply Scheme More images
N-KA-B45	Pattabhirama Temple	Kamalapuram		Vijayanagara	15°18′20″N 76°28′58″E	Pattabhirama Temple More images
N-KA-B46	Queen's Bath	Kamalapuram		Vijayanagara	15°18′48″N 76°28′21″E	Queen's Bath More images
N-KA-B47	Ruined Buildings of Minor Importance	Kamalapuram		Vijayanagara		Ruined Buildings of Minor Importance
N-KA-B48	Ruined Car Street in Front of Hasara Rama Temple	Kamalapuram		Vijayanagara	15°19′06″N 76°28′13″E	Ruined Car Street in Front of Hasara Rama Temple
N-KA-B49	Ruined Tank to Northeast of Pattabhirama Temple	Kamalapuram		Vijayanagara	15°18′22″N 76°29′08″E	Upload Photo
N-KA-B50	Southeast Watch tower in Zenana Enclosure	Kamalapuram		Vijayanagara	15°19′11″N 76°28′18″E	Southeast Watch tower in Zenana Enclosure More images
N-KA-B51	Two Pillars and Group of Mortar Wheels Outside Zenana Enclosure	Kamalapuram		Vijayanagara	15°19′17″N 76°28′15″E	Two Pillars and Group of Mortar Wheels Outside Zenana Enclosure
N-KA-B52	Two small Siva Temples with inscriptions to the east of Pattabhirama Temple	Kamalapuram		Vijayanagara	15°18′22″N 76°29′34″E	Upload Photo
N-KA-B53a	Water Pavilion in Zenana Enclosure	Kamalapuram		Vijayanagara	15°19′13″N 76°28′14″E	Upload Photo
N-KA-B53b	Guards House in Zenana Enclosure	Kamalapuram		Vijayanagara	15°19′15″N 76°28′19″E	Guards House in Zenana Enclosure More images
N-KA-B53c	Walls and Gateways of the Zenana Enclosure	Kamalapuram		Vijayanagara	15°19′14″N 76°28′12″E	Walls and Gateways of the Zenana Enclosure More images
N-KA-B53d	Ranga Temple	Kamalapuram		Vijayanagara	15°19′10″N 76°28′18″E	Ranga Temple
N-KA-B54	Water Tower of the city of Vijayanagar	Kamalapuram		Vijayanagara	15°18′48″N 76°28′25″E	Upload Photo
N-KA-B55	Krishna Temple	Krishnapuram		Vijayanagara	15°19′49″N 76°27′38″E	Krishna Temple More images
N-KA-B56	Linga Temple near Narsimha Statue Badavilinga Temple	Krishnapuram		Vijayanagara	15°19′45″N 76°27′33″E	Linga Temple near Narsimha Statue Badavilinga Temple More images
N-KA-B57	Narasimha Statue	Krishnapuram		Vijayanagara	15°19′45″N 76°27′32″E	Narasimha Statue More images
N-KA-B58	Parvati & Kartikeya Temples	Sanduru		Ballary	15°00′40″N 76°33′52″E	Parvati & Kartikeya Temples
N-KA-B59	Suryanarayana Temple	Magala		Vijayanagara	14°59′40″N 75°47′37″E	Upload Photo
N-KA-B60	Kalleswarswamy Temple	Mailara		Vijayanagara	14°48′32″N 75°41′26″E	Kalleswarswamy Temple More images
N-KA-B61	Soolai Well	Malapannana gudi		Vijayanagara	15°17′02″N 76°25′35″E	Soolai Well More images
N-KA-B62	Inscriptions of Ashoka (Rock Edicts)	Nittur		Ballary	15°32′50″N 76°49′58″E	Inscriptions of Ashoka (Rock Edicts) More images
N-KA-B63	Narasimha Swami Temple	Rangapuram		Vijayanagara	15°00′19″N 75°47′26″E	Upload Photo
N-KA-B64	Saraswathy Temple	Singanathana; Halli		Vijayanagara	15°18′37″N 76°25′46″E	Upload Photo
N-KA-B65	Gopala Krishnaswami Temple	Thimmalapur		Vijayanagara	15°02′37″N 76°21′10″E	Gopala Krishnaswami Temple More images
N-KA-B66	Siva's Temple	Thimmalapur		Vijayanagara	15°02′36″N 76°21′19″E	Siva's Temple More images
N-KA-B67	Ashokan Inscriptions (Rock Edicts)	Udeogolam		Ballary	15°31′11″N 76°49′57″E	Ashokan Inscriptions (Rock Edicts) More images
N-KA-B68	Achyutaraya (Triuvengalantha) Temple	Venkatapuram		Vijayanagara	15°19′55″N 76°28′12″E	Achyutaraya (Triuvengalantha) Temple More images
N-KA-B69	Fort Gateway on the Talarigattu Road	Venkatapuram		Vijayanagara	15°20′12″N 76°29′10″E	Fort Gateway on the Talarigattu Road More images
N-KA-B70	Inscribed Vishnu Temple near Vitthala Temple	Venkatapuram		Vijayanagara	15°20′34″N 76°28′27″E	Inscribed Vishnu Temple near Vitthala Temple
N-KA-B71	Jain Temple on the Hillside close to Vishnu Temple	Venkatapuram		Vijayanagara		Upload Photo
N-KA-B72	Gejjala Mandapa in a Field close to Talarigattu Road	Venkatapuram		Vijayanagara	15°20′23″N 76°29′06″E	Gejjala Mandapa in a Field close to Talarigattu Road More images
N-KA-B73	Raghunatha Swami Temple	Venkatapuram		Vijayanagara	15°19′28″N 76°29′18″E	Raghunatha Swami Temple More images
N-KA-B74	Ruined (restored) Tank Adjoining the Soolai Bazaar	Venkatapuram		Vijayanagara	15°20′06″N 76°28′10″E	Ruined (restored) Tank Adjoining the Soolai Bazaar More images
N-KA-B75	Two Storeyed Mandapa	Venkatapuram		Vijayanagara	15°19′57″N 76°27′35″E	Two Storeyed Mandapa More images
N-KA-B76	Ranganatha Swami Gudi Vishnu Temple No.I close to north end of Soolai Bazaar	Venkatapuram		Vijayanagara	15°20′10″N 76°28′13″E	Upload Photo
N-KA-B77	Vishnu Temple No.II close to the last	Venkatapuram		Vijayanagara	15°20′11″N 76°28′15″E	Upload Photo
N-KA-B78	Vishnu Temple No.III facing South Gateway of Vittala Temple	Venkatapuram		Vijayanagara	15°20′28″N 76°28′31″E	Vishnu Temple No.III facing South Gateway of Vittala Temple More images
N-KA-B79-a	Vittala Temple	Venkatapuram		Vijayanagara	15°20′32″N 76°28′31″E	Vittala Temple More images
N-KA-B79-b	King's Balance	Venkatapuram		Vijayanagara	15°20′27″N 76°28′27″E	King's Balance More images
N-KA-B79-c	Old Siva Temple on the North-East side of Vittala Temple	Venkatapuram		Vijayanagara		Old Siva Temple on the North-East side of Vittala Temple
N-KA-B79-d	Ruined Gateway with Lofty Pillars to the West of Vittala Temple	Venkatapuram		Vijayanagara	15°20′26″N 76°28′26″E	Ruined Gateway with Lofty Pillars to the West of Vittala Temple
N-KA-B80	Sri Vijayanarayana Temple	Gundlupet		Chamarajanagar	11°48′30″N 76°41′22″E	Sri Vijayanarayana Temple More images
N-KA-B81	Sri Arkesvara Temple	Hale Alur		Chamarajanagar	11°58′05″N 76°59′16″E	Sri Arkesvara Temple More images
N-KA-B82	Ramesvara Temple	Narasamangala		Chamarajanagar	11°48′12″N 76°51′35″E	Ramesvara Temple More images
N-KA-B83	Gaurisvara Temple	Yelandur		Chamarajanagar	12°02′49″N 77°01′47″E	Gaurisvara Temple More images
N-KA-B84	Amristesvara Temple	Amrithapura		Chikmagalur	13°44′29″N 75°51′14″E	Amristesvara Temple More images
N-KA-B85	Viranarayana Temple	Belavadi		Chikmagalur	13°16′55″N 75°59′44″E	Viranarayana Temple More images
N-KA-B86	Vidyasankara Temple	Sringeri		Chikmagalur	13°24′57″N 75°15′05″E	Vidyasankara Temple More images
N-KA-B87	Ashokan Inscription	Brahmgiri		Chitradurga	14°48′50″N 76°48′23″E	Upload Photo
N-KA-B88	Pre-Historic Site	Brahmgiri		Chitradurga		Upload Photo
N-KA-B89	Pre-Historic Site	Chandravalli		Chitradurga	14°12′19″N 76°22′51″E	Pre-Historic Site
N-KA-B90	Fortress & Temples on the hill	Chitradurga		Chitradurga	14°12′58″N 76°23′56″E	Fortress & Temples on the hill More images
N-KA-B91	Inscription and Jatingi Ramesvara Temple	Ramesvara Hill		Chitradurga	14°50′59″N 76°47′26″E	Upload Photo
N-KA-B92	Akka Tangi Temple & Ashokan Inscription Emmethammana Gundu	Siddapura		Chitradurga	14°48′30″N 76°48′08″E	Upload Photo
N-KA-B93	Dolmen Circle	Doddamolathe		Coorg-Kodagu	12°36′11″N 75°53′21″E	Upload Photo
N-KA-B94	Fort and Large Masonry Elephants	Mercara		Coorg (Kodagu)	12°25′16″N 75°44′19″E	Fort and Large Masonry Elephants More images
N-KA-B95	Raja's Seat	Mercara		Coorg-Kodagu	12°24′51″N 75°44′13″E	Raja's Seat More images
N-KA-B96	Three stone built Jaina Temples standing in a Courtyard with an inscription	Mullur		Coorg-Kodagu	12°41′30″N 75°55′09″E	Upload Photo
N-KA-B97	Dolmen Circle	Sulimolthe		Coorg-Kodagu	12°37′31″N 75°52′33″E	Dolmen Circle
N-KA-B98	Kalleswara Swami Temple	Bagali		Davangere	14°50′52″N 75°59′05″E	Kalleswara Swami Temple More images
N-KA-B99	Fort	Channagiri		Davangere	14°01′20″N 75°55′18″E	Fort
N-KA-B100	Kalleswara Temple	Halavagalu		Davangere	14°42′32″N 75°46′31″E	Upload Photo
N-KA-B101	Harihareswara Temple	Harihar		Davangere	14°30′44″N 75°48′08″E	Harihareswara Temple More images
N-KA-B102	Shahji's Tomb	Hodigere		Davangere	14°02′48″N 76°00′05″E	Shahji's Tomb
N-KA-B103	Malikarjuna Temple	Kuruvatti		Davangere	14°47′04″N 75°42′08″E	Malikarjuna Temple More images
N-KA-B104	Bhimesvara Temple	Nilagunda		Davangere	14°44′39″N 75°53′47″E	Bhimesvara Temple More images
N-KA-B105	Musafirkhana and Honda	Santhebennur		Davangere	14°10′00″N 76°00′16″E	Musafirkhana and Honda More images
N-KA-B106	Hill, Fort and Ruined Palace	Uchchangidurg		Davangere	14°33′39″N 76°02′54″E	Hill, Fort and Ruined Palace
N-KA-B107	Channakesva Temple	Arakere		Hassan	13°22′30″N 76°07′46″E	Channakesva Temple
N-KA-B108	Isvara Temple	Arsikere		Hassan	13°19′06″N 76°15′36″E	Isvara Temple More images
N-KA-B109	Kesava Temple and Inscriptions	Belur		Hassan	13°09′47″N 75°51′37″E	Kesava Temple and Inscriptions More images
N-KA-B110	Lakshmi Devi Temple	Doddagadda; Vall		Hassan	13°05′45″N 76°00′14″E	Lakshmi Devi Temple More images
N-KA-B111	Adinatha Basadi	Halebidu		Hassan	13°12′31″N 75°59′42″E	Adinatha Basadi More images
N-KA-B112	Hoysaleswara Temple	Halebidu		Hassan	13°12′45″N 75°59′39″E	Hoysaleswara Temple More images
N-KA-B113	Kedaresvara Temple	Halebidu		Hassan	13°12′32″N 75°59′55″E	Kedaresvara Temple More images
N-KA-B114	Parsvanatha Basadi	Halebidu		Hassan	13°12′31″N 75°59′41″E	Parsvanatha Basadi More images
N-KA-B115	Santhinatha Basadi	Halebidu		Hassan	13°12′31″N 75°59′43″E	Santhinatha Basadi More images
N-KA-B116	Kalyani Tank	Hulikere		Hassan	13°11′57″N 76°00′11″E	Kalyani Tank More images
N-KA-B117	Buchesvara Temple	Koravangala		Hassan	13°03′11″N 76°10′37″E	Buchesvara Temple More images
N-KA-B118	Manjarabad Fort and Dungeons	Manjarabad		Hassan	12°55′03″N 75°45′30″E	Manjarabad Fort and Dungeons More images
N-KA-B119	Nagesvara and Chennakesava Temple	Mosale		Hassan	13°09′46″N 75°51′38″E	Nagesvara and Chennakesava Temple More images
N-KA-B120	Lakshminarasimha Temple	Nuggehalli		Hassan	13°00′39″N 76°28′31″E	Lakshminarasimha Temple More images
N-KA-B121	Sadasiva Temple	Nuggehalli		Hassan	13°00′42″N 76°28′38″E	Sadasiva Temple More images
N-KA-B122	Akkana Basadi	Sravanabelgola		Hassan	12°51′34″N 76°29′20″E	Akkana Basadi More images
N-KA-B123	Chandragupta Basadi	Sravanabelgola		Hassan	12°51′42″N 76°29′13″E	Chandragupta Basadi More images
N-KA-B124	Chavundaraya Basadi	Sravanabelgola		Hassan	12°51′43″N 76°29′13″E	Chavundaraya Basadi More images
N-KA-B125	Gommateshwara statue	Sravanabelgola		Hassan	12°51′14″N 76°29′05″E	Gommateshwara statue More images
N-KA-B126	Inscriptions	Sravanabelgola		Hassan	12°51′15″N 76°29′05″E	Inscriptions More images
N-KA-B127	Parsvanatha Basadi	Sravanabelgola		Hassan	12°51′07″N 76°28′50″E	Parsvanatha Basadi More images
N-KA-B128	Ramalingesvara Temples and Inscriptions	Avani		Kolar	13°06′23″N 78°19′36″E	Ramalingesvara Temples and Inscriptions More images
N-KA-B129	Haider Ali's Birth Place	Budikote		Kolar	12°54′17″N 78°07′40″E	Upload Photo
N-KA-B130	Prehistoric Site	Hunkunda		Kolar	13°02′46″N 78°14′49″E	Upload Photo
N-KA-B131	Kolaramma Temple	Kolar		Kolar	13°08′18″N 78°08′19″E	Kolaramma Temple More images
N-KA-B132	Somesvara Temple	Kolar		Kolar	13°08′15″N 78°08′18″E	Somesvara Temple More images
N-KA-B133	Mausoleum of Haider Ali's Father	Kolar		Kolar	13°07′55″N 78°07′33″E	Mausoleum of Haider Ali's Father More images
N-KA-B134	Bhoganandishwara Temple	Nandi Hills		Kolar	13°23′12″N 77°41′53″E	Bhoganandishwara Temple More images
N-KA-B135	Tipu's Palace	Nandi Hills		Kolar	13°22′19″N 77°40′50″E	Tipu's Palace More images
N-KA-B136	Ancient Jaina Vestiges	Artipura (Arethippuru)		Mandya	12°31′04″N 77°07′49″E	Ancient Jaina Vestiges More images
N-KA-B137	Mallikarjuna Temple	Basaral		Mandya	12°42′37″N 76°49′02″E	Mallikarjuna Temple More images
N-KA-B138	Panchlingesvara Temple	Govindanahalli		Mandya	12°46′26″N 76°23′30″E	Panchlingesvara Temple More images
N-KA-B139	Lakshminarayana Temple	Hosaholalu		Mandya	12°38′33″N 76°28′43″E	Lakshminarayana Temple More images
N-KA-B140	Panchakuta Basadi	Kambadahalli		Mandya	12°52′03″N 76°38′00″E	Panchakuta Basadi More images
N-KA-B141	Lakshminarasihmaswamy Temple	Marehalli		Mandya	12°21′54″N 77°03′46″E	Lakshminarasihmaswamy Temple More images
N-KA-B142	Narayanaswamy Temple	Melukote		Mandya	12°39′37″N 76°38′52″E	Narayanaswamy Temple More images
N-KA-B143	Saumyakeshava Temple	Nagamangala		Mandya	12°49′11″N 76°45′13″E	Saumyakeshava Temple More images
N-KA-B144	Lakshminarayana Temple	Sindaghatta		Mandya	12°41′43″N 76°32′49″E	Upload Photo
N-KA-B145	Ancient Palace site and Remains	Srirangapatna		Mandya	12°25′32″N 76°41′01″E	Ancient Palace site and Remains
N-KA-B146	Colonel Bailey's Dungeon	Srirangapatna		Mandya	12°25′36″N 76°40′43″E	Colonel Bailey's Dungeon More images
N-KA-B147	Daria Daulat Bagh	Srirangapatna		Mandya	12°25′12″N 76°41′49″E	Daria Daulat Bagh More images
N-KA-B148	Gumbaj containing tomb of Tipu Sultan	Srirangapatna		Mandya	12°24′36″N 76°42′50″E	Gumbaj containing tomb of Tipu Sultan More images
N-KA-B149	Juma Masjid Masjid-i-Ala	Srirangapatna		Mandya	12°25′21″N 76°41′20″E	Juma Masjid Masjid-i-Ala More images
N-KA-B150	Obelisk Monuments and Fort walls near the Breach	Srirangapatna		Mandya	12°25′31″N 76°40′27″E	Obelisk Monuments and Fort walls near the Breach More images
N-KA-B151	Spot where Tipu's Body was found	Srirangapatna		Mandya	12°25′30″N 76°41′16″E	Spot where Tipu's Body was found More images
N-KA-B152	Sri Kanthirava Statue in Narasimha Temple	Srirangapatna		Mandya	12°25′28″N 76°40′54″E	Upload Photo
N-KA-B153	Sri Ranganatha Svami Temple	Srirangapatna		Mandya	12°25′30″N 76°40′45″E	Sri Ranganatha Svami Temple More images
N-KA-B154	Thomas Inman's Dungeon	Srirangapatna		Mandya	12°25′29″N 76°41′24″E	Upload Photo
N-KA-B155	Nambi Narayana Temple	Tonnur		Mandya	12°33′25″N 76°38′30″E	Nambi Narayana Temple
N-KA-B156	Sidlu Mallikarjuna Temple	Bettadapur		Mysore	12°27′14″N 76°06′58″E	Upload Photo
N-KA-B157	Pre-Historic Site	Kittur		Mysore		Upload Photo
N-KA-B158	Lakshmikanta Temple	Mullur		Mysore	11°58′42″N 76°28′29″E	Upload Photo
N-KA-B159	Sri Srikanteshvara Temple	Nanjangud		Mysore	12°07′10″N 76°41′38″E	Sri Srikanteshvara Temple More images
N-KA-B160	Keshava Temple	Somanathapur		Mysore	12°16′33″N 76°52′54″E	Keshava Temple More images
N-KA-B161	Kirtinarayana Temple	Talakadu		Mysore	12°10′46″N 77°01′28″E	Kirtinarayana Temple More images
N-KA-B162	Vaidyeshwara Temple	Talakadu		Mysore	12°10′45″N 77°01′35″E	Vaidyeshwara Temple More images
N-KA-B163	Jaina Temple (Shanthinatha Basadi)	Bandalike		Shimoga	14°29′04″N 75°15′57″E	Upload Photo
N-KA-B164	Someshvara Temple	Bandalike		Shimoga	14°29′14″N 75°16′01″E	Upload Photo
N-KA-B165	Trimurthinarayana Temple	Bandalike		Shimoga	14°29′13″N 75°15′59″E	Upload Photo
N-KA-B166	Devaganga Ponds at Basavanabayane	Nagar		Shimoga	13°50′30″N 75°01′39″E	Devaganga Ponds at Basavanabayane More images
N-KA-B167	Bherundeshvara Temple	Balligavi		Shimoga	14°23′59″N 75°14′22″E	Bherundeshvara Temple More images
N-KA-B168	Kedaresvara Temple	Balligavi		Shimoga	14°23′39″N 75°14′39″E	Kedaresvara Temple More images
N-KA-B169	Tripurantesvara Temple	Balligavi		Shimoga	14°24′00″N 75°14′35″E	Tripurantesvara Temple More images
N-KA-B170	Somanathaswamy Temple	Balligavi		Shimoga	14°23′58″N 75°14′31″E	Upload Photo
N-KA-B171	Fortress and Renuka Temple	Chandragutti		Shimoga	14°26′00″N 74°57′04″E	Upload Photo
N-KA-B172	Basati's and Inscriptions	Humcha		Shimoga	13°51′42″N 75°12′20″E	Upload Photo
N-KA-B173	Aghoreshvara Temple	Ikkeri		Shimoga	14°08′06″N 75°01′21″E	Aghoreshvara Temple More images
N-KA-B174	Kavaledurga Fort	Kavaledurga		Shimoga	13°43′08″N 75°07′19″E	Kavaledurga Fort More images
N-KA-B175	Rameswara Temple	Keladi		Shimoga	14°13′27″N 75°01′00″E	Rameswara Temple More images
N-KA-B176	Kaitabhesvara Temple	Kubattur		Shimoga	14°34′32″N 75°08′51″E	Kaitabhesvara Temple More images
N-KA-B177	Parshwanatha Basadi	Kubattur		Shimoga	14°34′26″N 75°08′11″E	Upload Photo
N-KA-B178	Rameshwara Temple	Kubattur		Shimoga	14°34′31″N 75°08′11″E	Upload Photo
N-KA-B179	Rameshwara Temple	Kudli		Shimoga	14°00′25″N 75°40′29″E	Rameshwara Temple More images
N-KA-B180	Temples and Inscriptions	Kuppagadde		Shimoga	14°28′27″N 75°06′42″E	Temples and Inscriptions
N-KA-B181	Inscribed Pillar	Malavalli		Shimoga	14°29′02″N 75°19′23″E	Inscribed Pillar
N-KA-B182	Jaina Basti with Brahmadeva Pillar	Melagi		Shimoga	13°40′01″N 75°17′06″E	Upload Photo
N-KA-B183	Mallikarjuna & Ramesvara Temple	Nadkalsi		Shimoga	14°11′26″N 75°05′08″E	Mallikarjuna & Ramesvara Temple More images
N-KA-B184	Palace site Outside the Fort	Nagar		Shimoga	13°49′20″N 75°02′03″E	Palace site Outside the Fort More images
N-KA-B185	Shivappa Naik's Fort	Nagar		Shimoga	13°49′20″N 75°02′03″E	Shivappa Naik's Fort More images
N-KA-B186	Inscribed Pillar	Talagunda		Shimoga	14°25′21″N 75°15′12″E	Inscribed Pillar More images
N-KA-B187	Pranavesvara Temple	Talagunda		Shimoga	14°25′21″N 75°15′11″E	Pranavesvara Temple More images
N-KA-B188	Temples and Inscriptions	Udri		Dakshina Kannada	14°26′37″N 75°08′51″E	Temples and Inscriptions
N-KA-B189	Stambha in Front of the Kotakeri Jaina Basti	Bappanad		Dakshina Kannada	13°05′41″N 74°47′35″E	Upload Photo
N-KA-B190	Sultan Battery	Boloor Mangalore		Dakshina Kannada	12°53′23″N 74°49′16″E	Sultan Battery More images
N-KA-B191	Mangaladevi Temple	Mangalore		Dakshina Kannada	12°50′57″N 74°50′44″E	Mangaladevi Temple More images
N-KA-B192	Jamalabad Fort	Nada & Laila		Dakshina Kannada	13°01′35″N 75°17′40″E	Jamalabad Fort More images
N-KA-B193	Channigaraya Temple	Aralaguppe		Tumakuru	13°15′08″N 76°36′55″E	Channigaraya Temple More images
N-KA-B194	Madhugiri Fort	Madhugiri		Tumakuru	13°39′06″N 77°12′00″E	Madhugiri Fort More images
N-KA-B195	Chennakesava Temple	Nagalapura		Tumakuru	13°05′13″N 76°41′28″E	Chennakesava Temple
N-KA-B196	Juma Masjid	Sira		Tumakuru	13°44′35″N 76°54′22″E	Juma Masjid
N-KA-B197	Malik Rihan Dargah	Sira		Tumakuru	13°44′06″N 76°54′30″E	Malik Rihan Dargah
N-KA-B198	Kathale Basti consisting of two small ruined stone built Jaina Mandapas, a little Siva Temple containing a linga and a small Oblong Stone-built Temple	Hosal		Udupi	13°28′13″N 74°45′08″E	Upload Photo
N-KA-B199	Ananthapadmanabha temple with ancient 'Dalans' in ruins around	Karkala		Udupi	13°12′47″N 75°00′14″E	Ananthapadmanabha temple with ancient 'Dalans' in ruins around More images
N-KA-B200	Chaturmukha Basadi, Karkala	Karkala		Udupi	13°12′31″N 75°00′18″E	Chaturmukha Basadi, Karkala More images
N-KA-B201	Gommateshwara statue, Karkala	Karkala		Udupi	13°12′13″N 75°00′20″E	Gommateshwara statue, Karkala More images
N-KA-B202	Great Manastambha at Haleyangadi	Karkala		Udupi	13°03′12″N 74°47′38″E	Upload Photo
N-KA-B203	Inner Courtyard of Chowtar's Palace at Mudabidri	Mudabidri		Udupi	13°04′18″N 74°59′46″E	Inner Courtyard of Chowtar's Palace at Mudabidri
N-KA-B204	Seventeen Jaina tombs at Mudabidri	Prantya		Udupi	13°04′30″N 75°00′26″E	Seventeen Jaina tombs at Mudabidri More images
N-KA-B205	Virupaksha Temple and Bazar	Hampi		Vijayanagara	15°20′05″N 76°27′40″E	Virupaksha Temple and Bazar More images
N-KA-B206	Prehistoric Anthropomorphic Figure	Kumati		Ballary	14°41′17″N 76°35′28″E	Upload Photo
N-KA-B207	Kedaresvara temple	Nagalapura		Tumakuru	13°05′18″N 76°41′38″E	Upload Photo

== See also ==
- List of Monuments of National Importance in Belgaum district
- List of Monuments of National Importance in Bidar district
- List of Monuments of National Importance in Bijapur district
- List of Monuments of National Importance in Dharwad district
- List of Monuments of National Importance in Gulbarga district
- List of Monuments of National Importance in North Kanara district
- List of Monuments of National Importance in Raichur district
- List of Monuments of National Importance in India for other Monuments of National Importance in India
- List of State Protected Monuments in Karnataka
