= Ananthasayana Temple =

Hindu temple in Karnataka, India

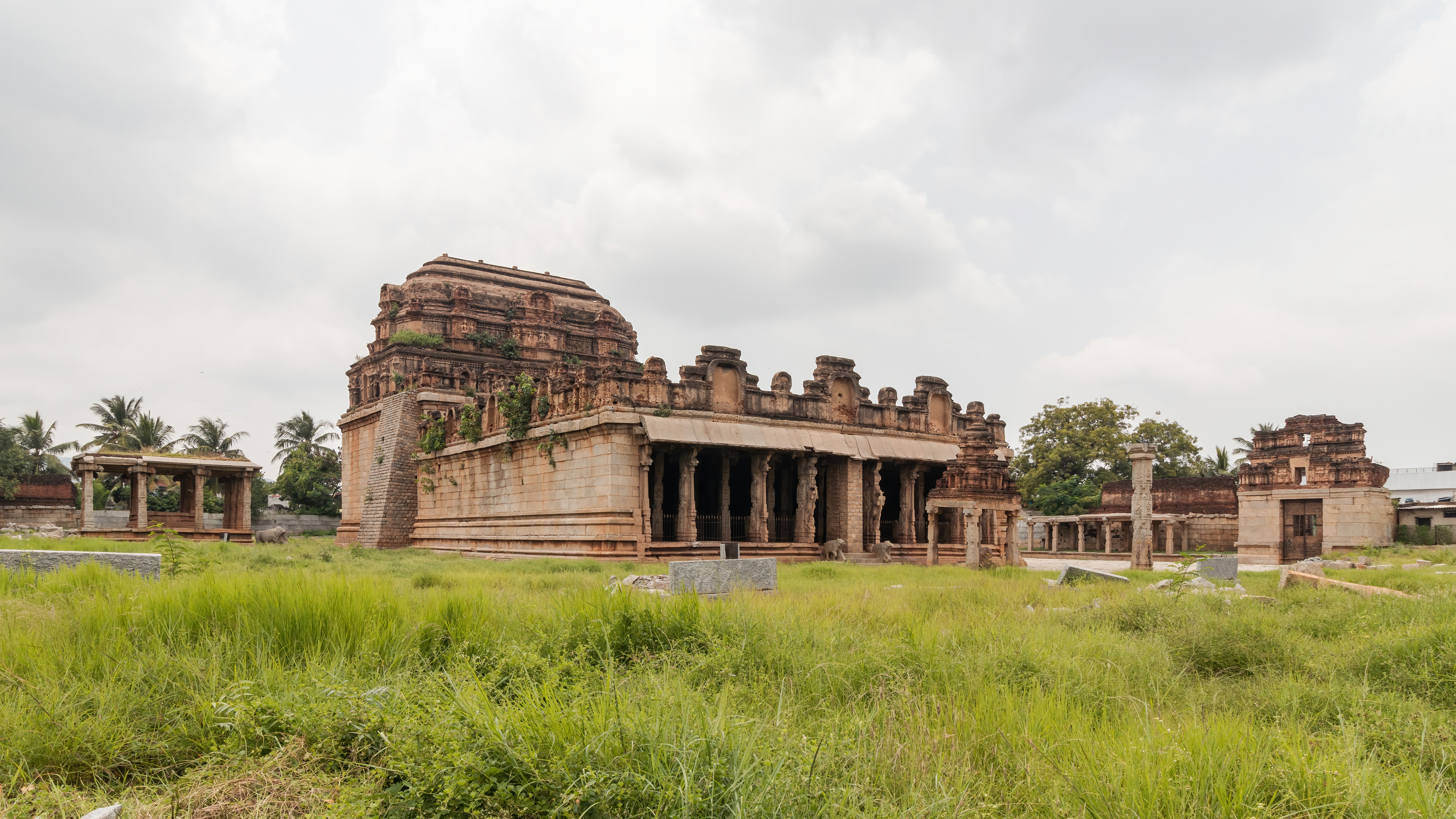
- Ananthasayana Temple

- Location in Karnataka, India Ananthasayana Temple (Karnataka)

Religion
- Affiliation: Hinduism
- District: Bellary district
- Deity: Vishnu

Location
- Location: Hospet
- State: Karnataka
- Country: India
- Coordinates: 15°16′41″N 76°24′26″E

Architecture
- Style: Vijayanagara architecture
- Creator: Krishnadevaraya
- Completed: 1524 CE

UNESCO World Heritage Site
- Official name: Shri Ananthashayana Temple
- Part of: Group of Monuments at Hampi
- Criteria: Cultural:
- Reference: 241bis-001
- Inscription: 1986 (10th Session)
- Extensions: N/A

Ananthasayana temple in Ananthasayanagudi, Vijayanagara district, Karnataka state, India was constructed by King Krishnadeva Raya (1524 CE) of the Vijayanagara Empire in memory of his deceased son.

== Etymology ==
The temple is known as Shri Ananthashayana, named after the deity Vishnu, who is depicted reclining on the cosmic serpent Ananta.

== History ==
The temple was erected by the renowned king Krishnadevaraya in 1524. Although the temple is significant, the inscription detailing its history is missing. The temple is believed to be connected to the artistic endeavors of the Vijayanagara Empire. This empire, renowned for its grandeur and achievements, was described by the 15th-century Persian ambassador, Abdur Razzak, as a remarkable place unmatched on earth. Today, the remnants of this once-glorious kingdom, particularly around Hampi in the Bellary district, stand as ruins that echo the empire's past splendor.

== Architecture ==
The temple is unique in its construction, featuring a large rectangular sanctuary that is accessed through triple doorways. This sanctuary was intended to accommodate a reclining image of Vishnu. The temple's structure is primarily made of plaster-covered brickwork, with only its long granite pedestal currently visible. A striking feature is the vaulted roof, which rises approximately 24 meters above the sanctuary, with semi-circular ends that are still intact, though partially restored. The sanctuary is preceded by a spacious mandapa supported by lofty columns.

== Cultural significance ==
The temple's architectural design reflects the artistic traditions of the time, particularly in the way it accommodates the deity. A notable legend associated with the temple tells of a guide tasked with transporting the idol of Anantasayana to its intended location, who was instructed not to look back. When he broke this agreement, the idol remained immovable at Holalu, reflecting the challenges faced during that era.

== Gallery ==
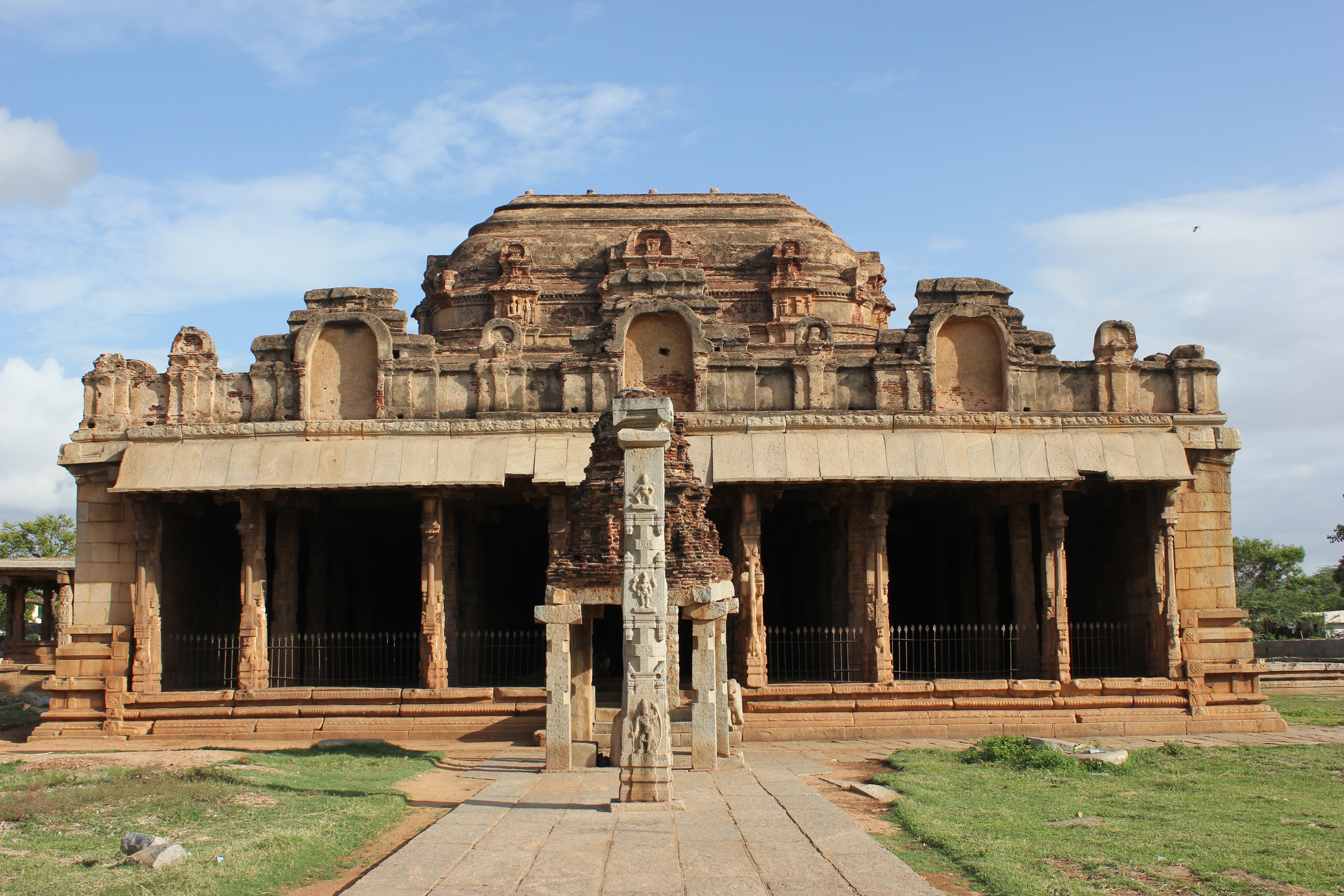
Ananthasayana temple

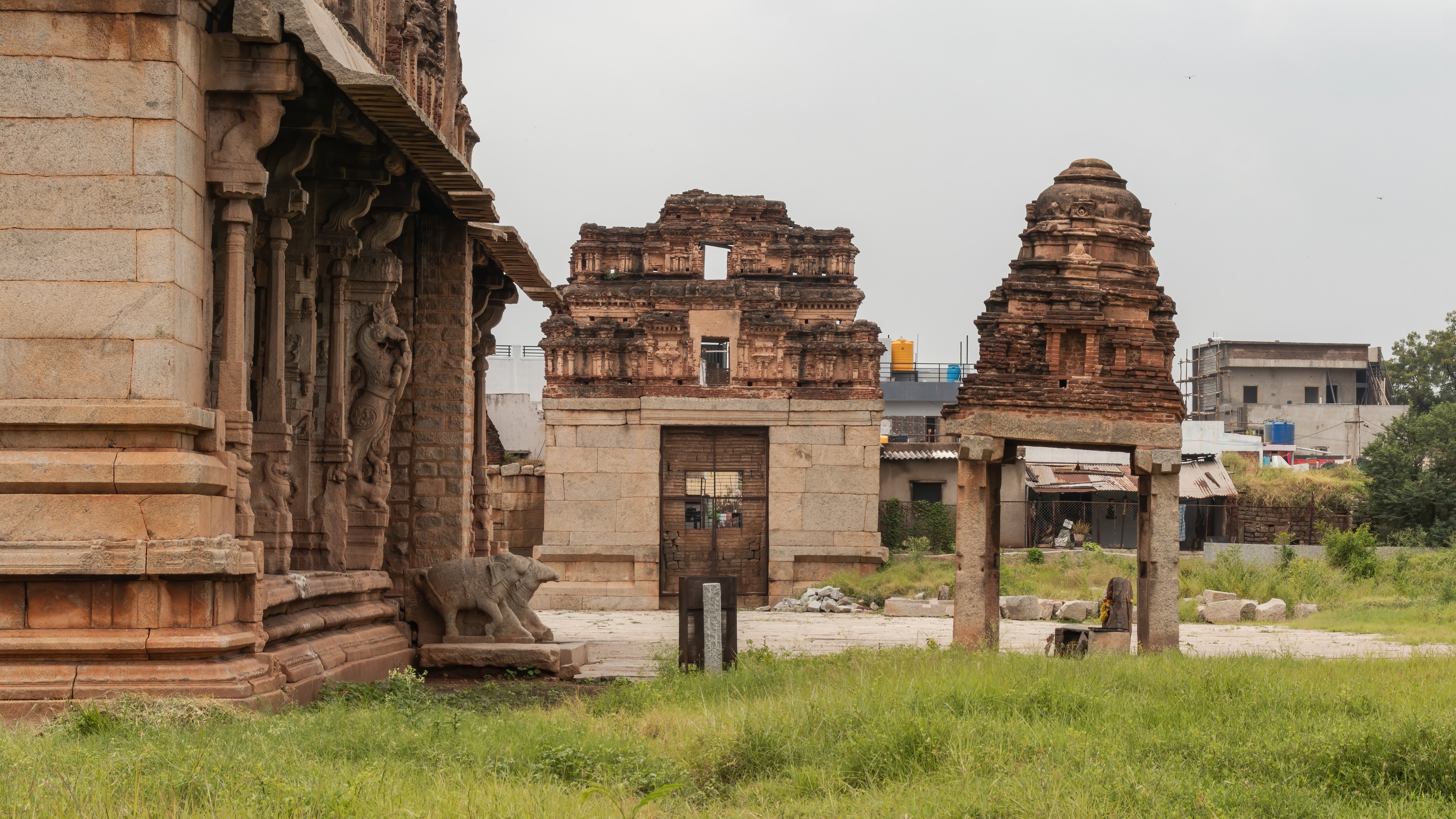
West Gopuram & Lord Hanuman Mandapa of Shri Ananthashayana Temple

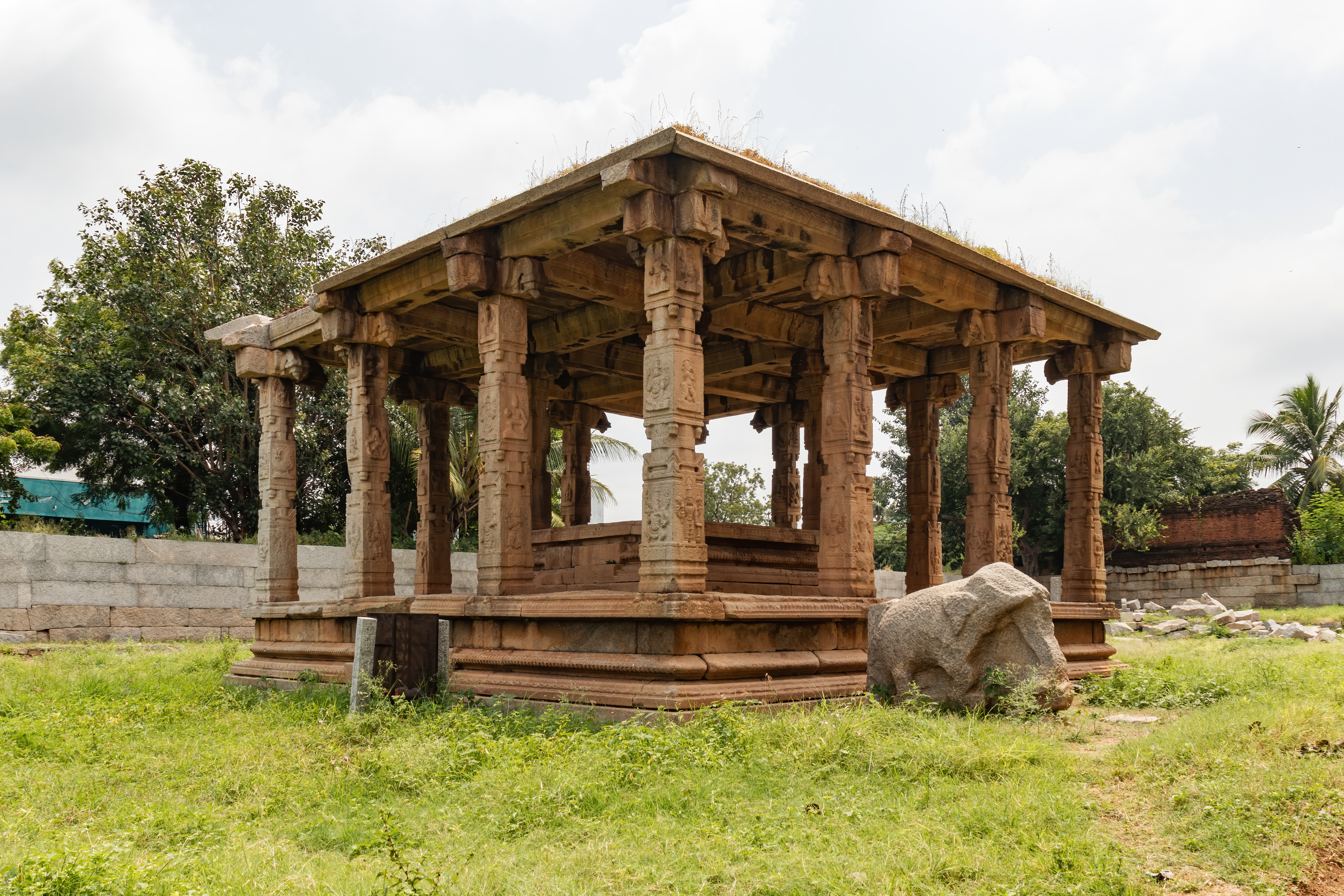
Mandapa near Ancient well

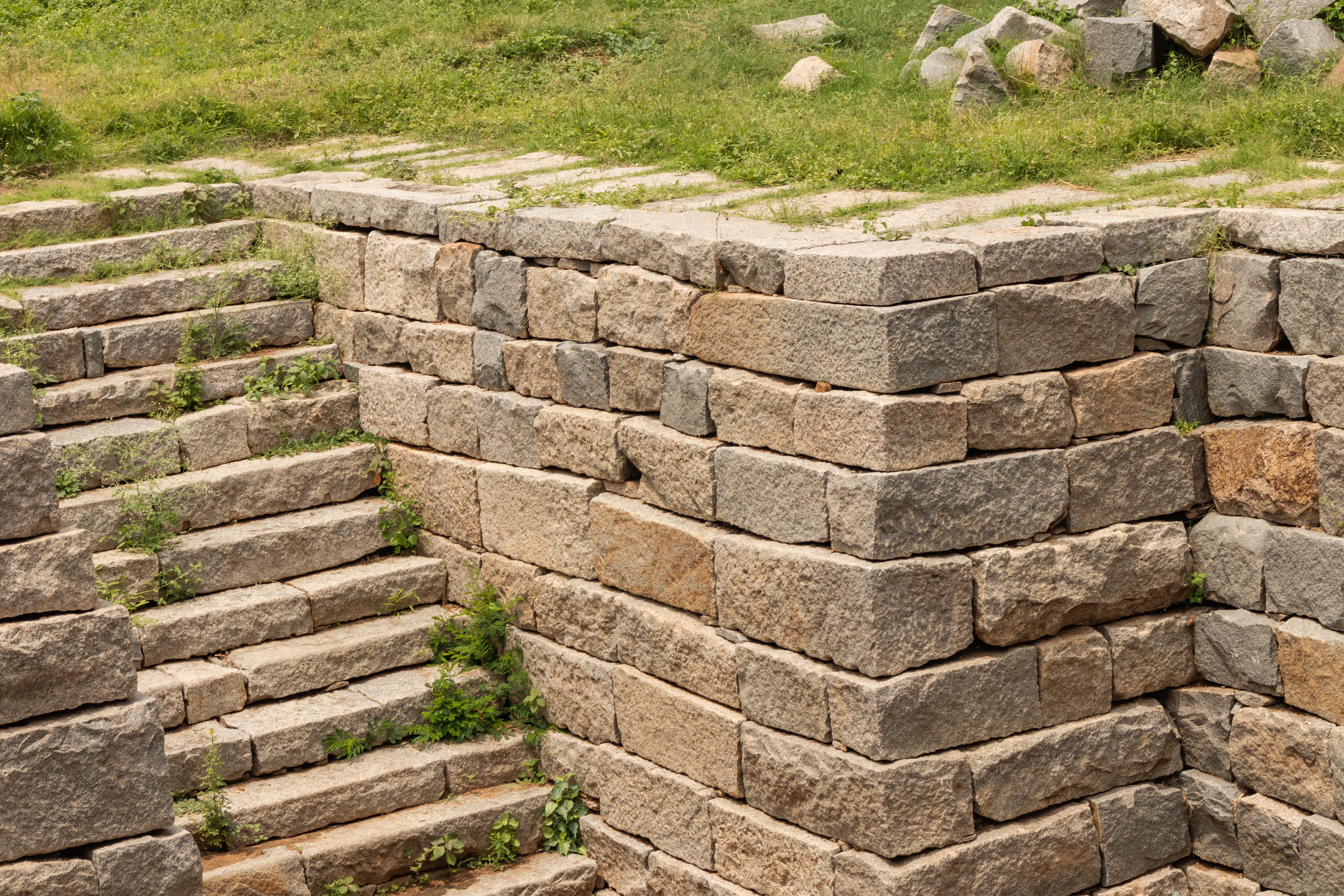
Stairs leading to the Ancient well

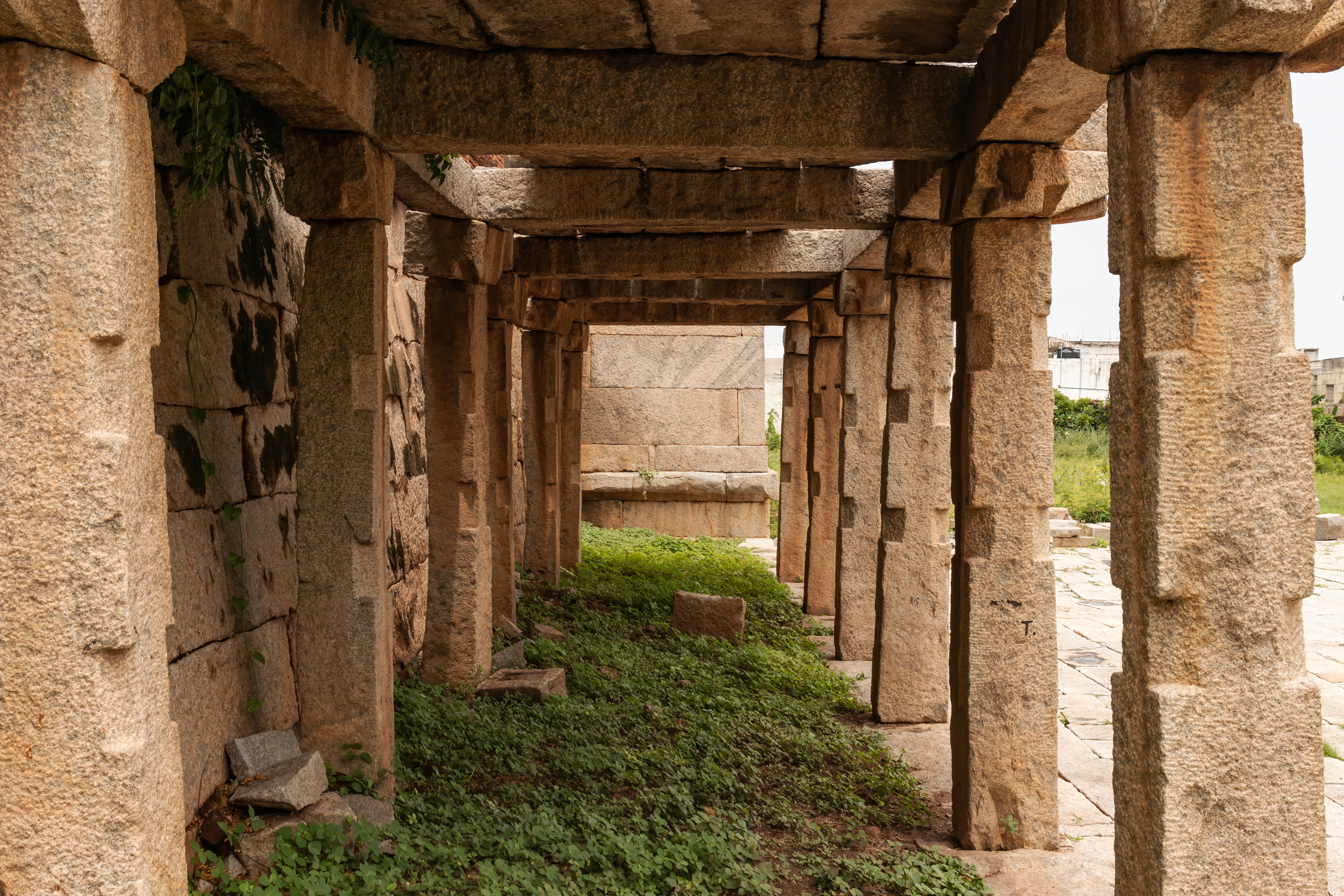
Mandapa near West Gopuram

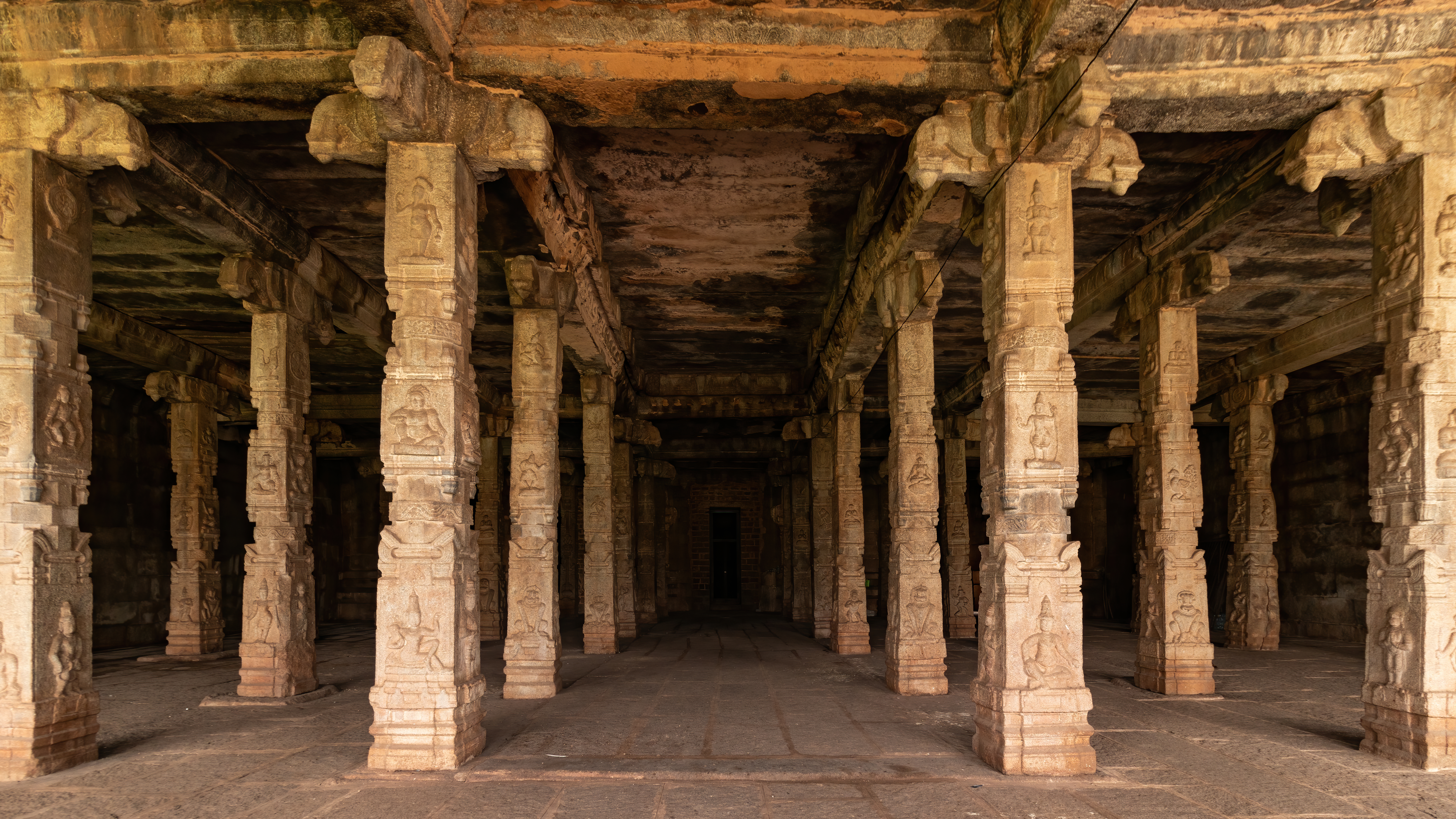
Inside the Garbhagriha

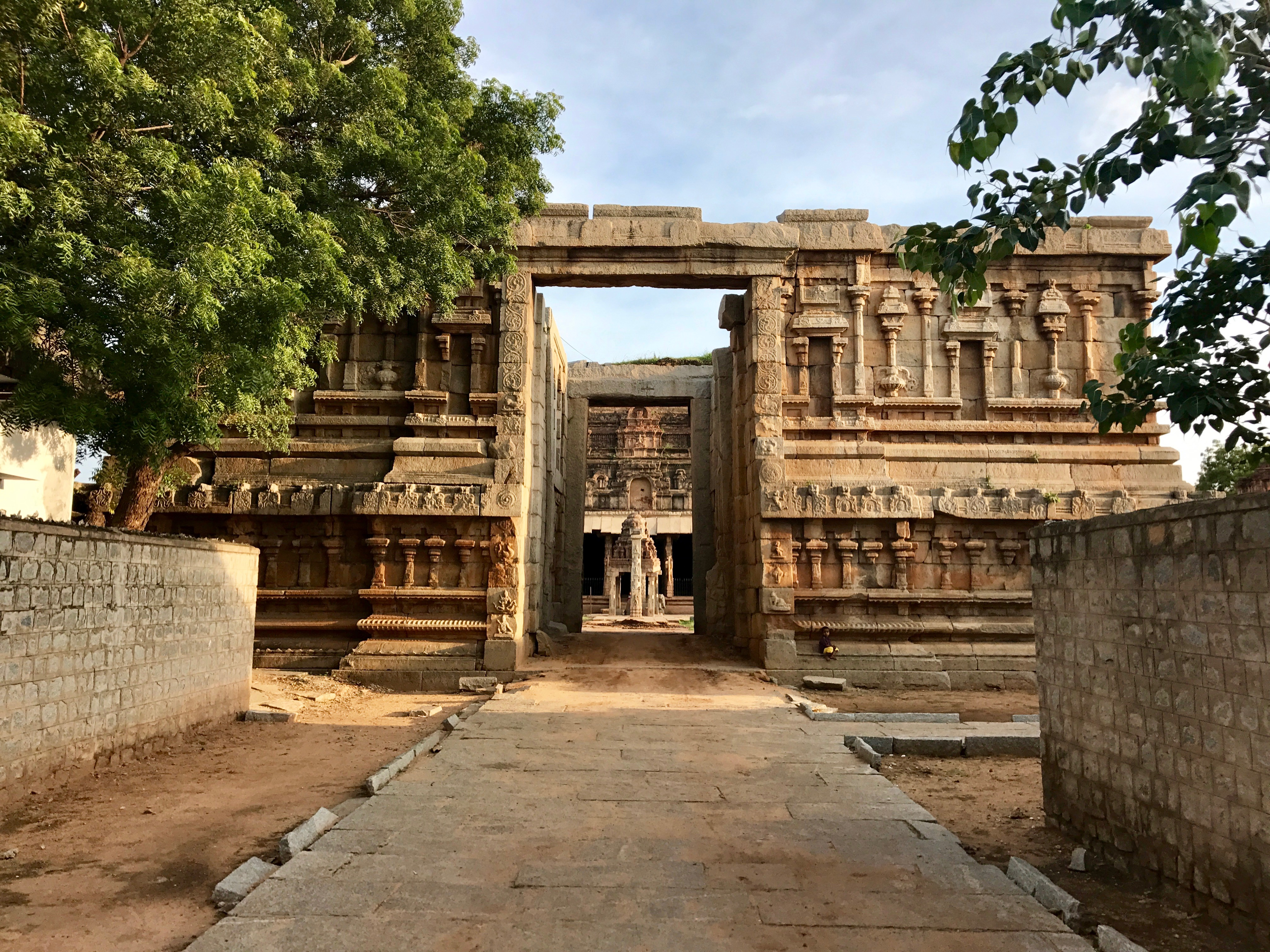
A view through the Galigopuram
