= Kavaledurga Fort =

Fort in India

- Part of Tirthahalli
- Tirthahalli, India
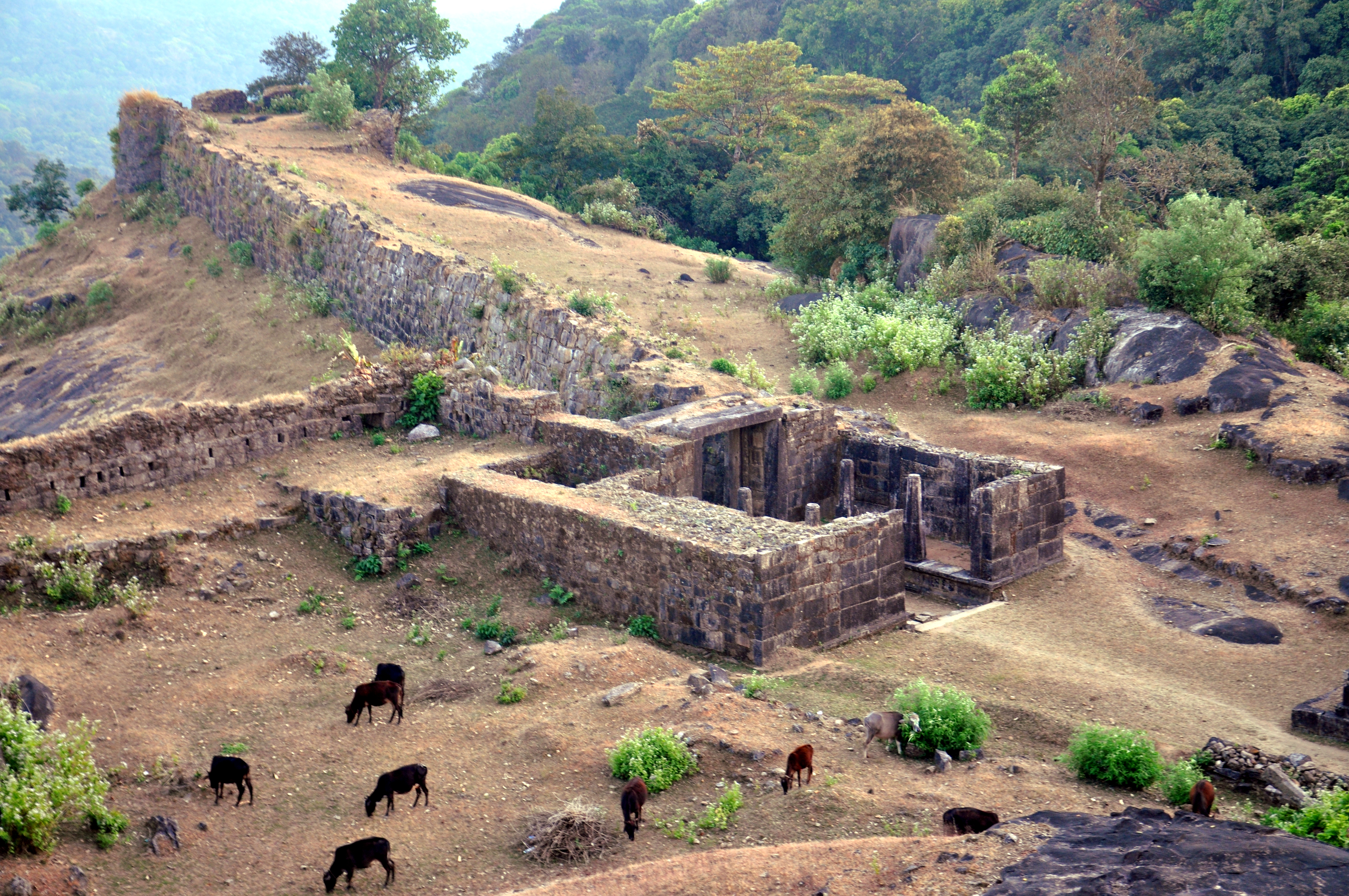
- Aerial view

Site information
- Type: Fort
- Controlled by: Archaeological survey of india
- Open to the public: Yes
- Condition: Ruins

Location
- Coordinates: 13.71879°N 75.12198°E

Site history
- Built: 9th century
- Materials: Granites

Kavualedurga Fort (Kannada ಕವಲೇದುರ್ಗದ ಕೋಟೆ) is a 9th-century fort 18 km (11 mi) from Thirthahalli, Shimoga. It was the fourth and last capital of Keladi kingdom. The fort was administered by the Keladi Nayakas from 1499 and later asserted its independence following the 1565 fall of Vijayanagara, enduring sieges and serving as a refuge for figures such as Queen Chennamma in 1677 and the Maratha prince Rajaram in 1689. Under successive Mysore rulers it saw intermittent garrison use before gradual abandonment left its concentric walls, hidden stairways, and temple ruins to decay amid lush monsoon foliage.

== History ==
Kavaledurga, often called the "Sentinel Fort" or "Bhuvanagiri Durga", occupies a heavily forested hilltop whose earliest fortifications may date back to the 9th century, when its natural ramparts first drew Chola military builders to the site. From 1499 AD the Keladi Nayakas, initially vassals of the Vijayanagara Empire, administered the fortress. After the fall of Vijayanagara in 1565, Kavaledurga declared independence and held sway here until Hyder Ali annexed their territories in 1763. Under King Venkatappa Nayaka in the 16th century, the fort was extensively strengthened, and in 1677 Queen Chennamma having fled the Bijapur siege of her capital at Bidanur used Kavaledurga as a secure base from which to rally her forces and recapture Nagara. Later, in 1689, the young Maratha prince Rajaram found asylum within its walls while on the run from Aurangzeb’s armies, cementing the fort's reputation as a sanctuary against imperial aggression. Thereafter Kavaledurga saw intermittent garrison use under Mysore's rulers before gradually falling into ruin, its crumbling ramparts and temple ruins now echoing the region's tumultuous medieval and early modern history.

== Architecture ==
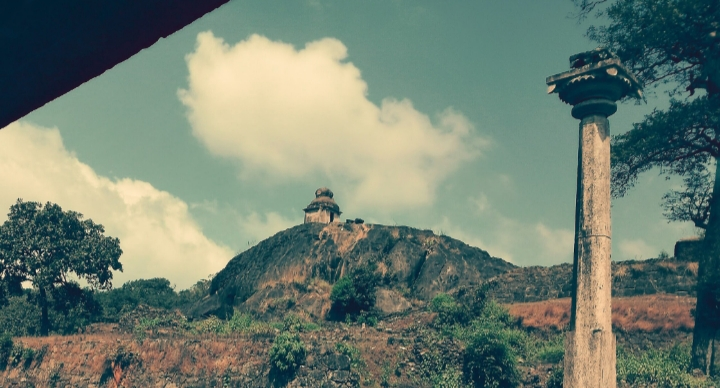
Old narsimha temple view

Kavaledurga Fort is termed as a marvel of medieval engineering, its multiple levels were aligned with the hill's natural contours, blending stone fortifications with boulders and outcrops for camouflage. The fort houses remnants of a once-extensive palace, including a plinth, numerous stone columns, a T-shaped stepped tank, a stone toilet, and even a firewood stove, all carved from stone. Its inner fortifications include a small stone gateway accessed via a stairway, while strategically placed structures like a linga-shrine perched on a rocky outcrop reflect the builders' architectural ambition. The fort's three concentric walls, hidden pathways, and integration with lush monsoon foliage highlight its strategic design and its harmony with the surrounding Western Ghats landscape.
