= Tripurantaka Temple =

Hindu temple in India

Coordinates: 14°23′38″N 75°14′38″E

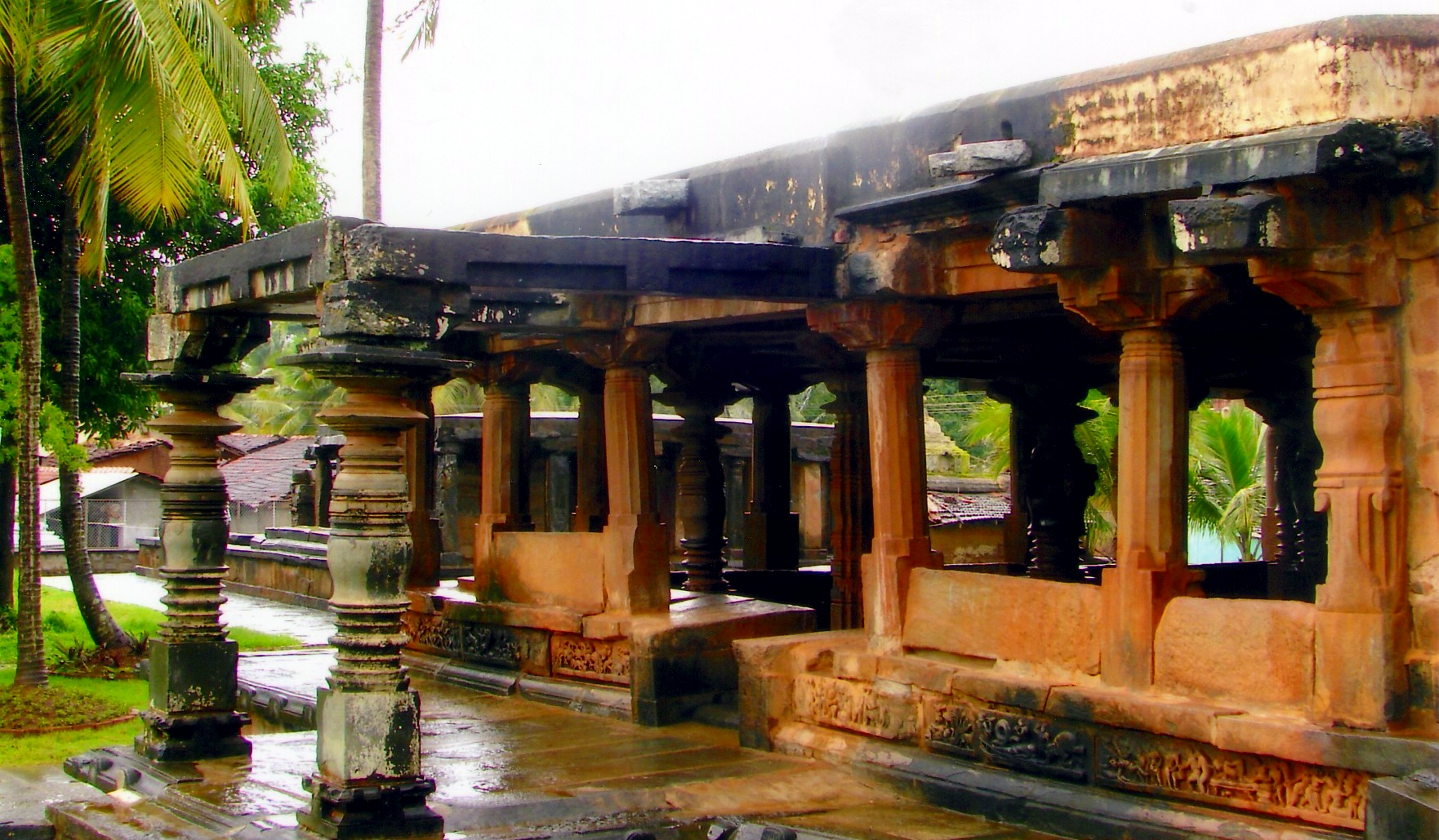
Entrance of Tripurantaka temple with erotic sculptures at the base

The Tripurantaka Temple (also called Tripurantakesvara or Tripurantakeshwara) was built around c. 1070 CE by the Western Chalukyas. This temple, which is in a dilapidated state, is in the historically important town of Balligavi (also called Balagamve), modern Shivamogga district, Karnataka state, India. The exterior walls of the temple have erotic sculptures on friezes. These depictions are considered rare in Chalukyan art. Being miniature in size, these are visible only upon close examination. During medieval times, Balligavi was a seat of learning to multiple religious faiths and was home to many monuments and structures built by the Chalukyas. More than 80 medieval inscriptions have been discovered in Balligavi and belong to the Shaiva, Vaishnava, Jain and Buddhist faiths. These inscriptions describe, among other things, the building of temples.

== Other sculptures ==
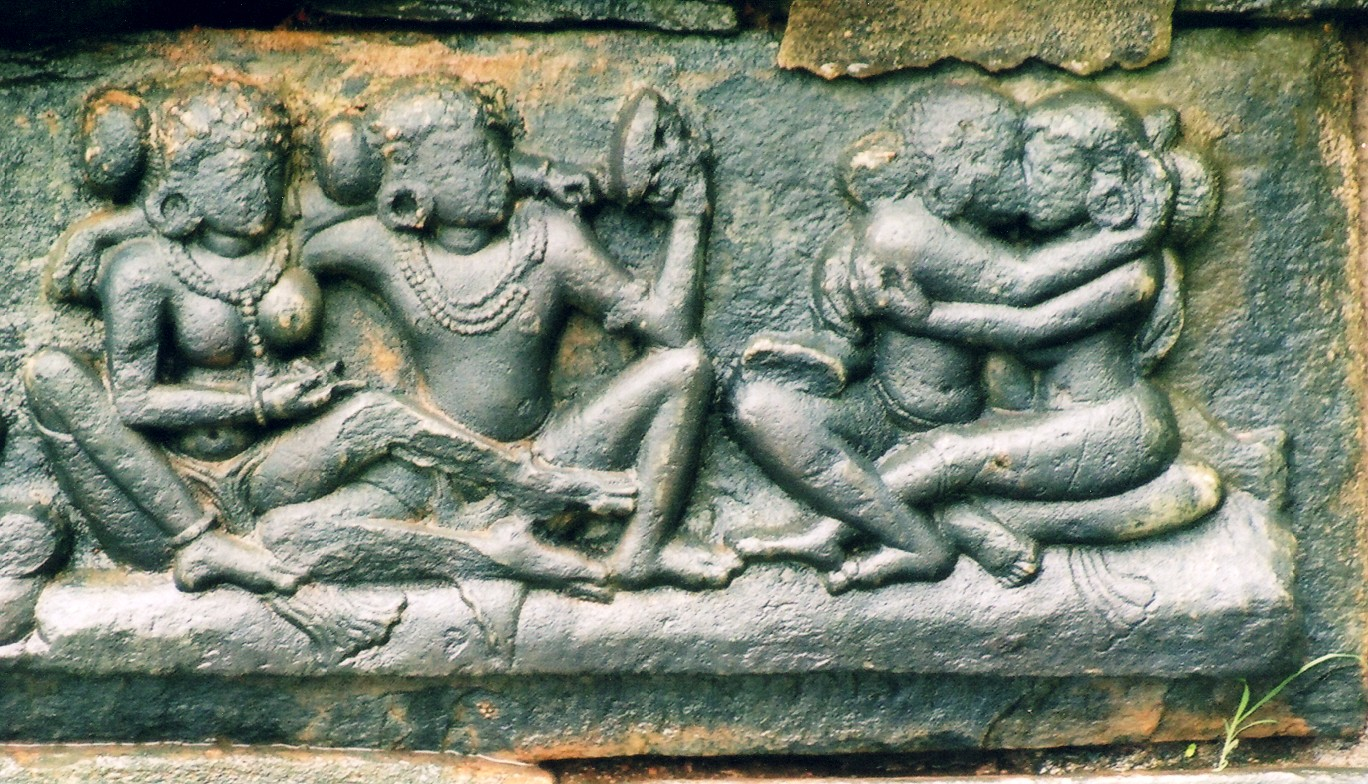
Kamasutra art sculpture

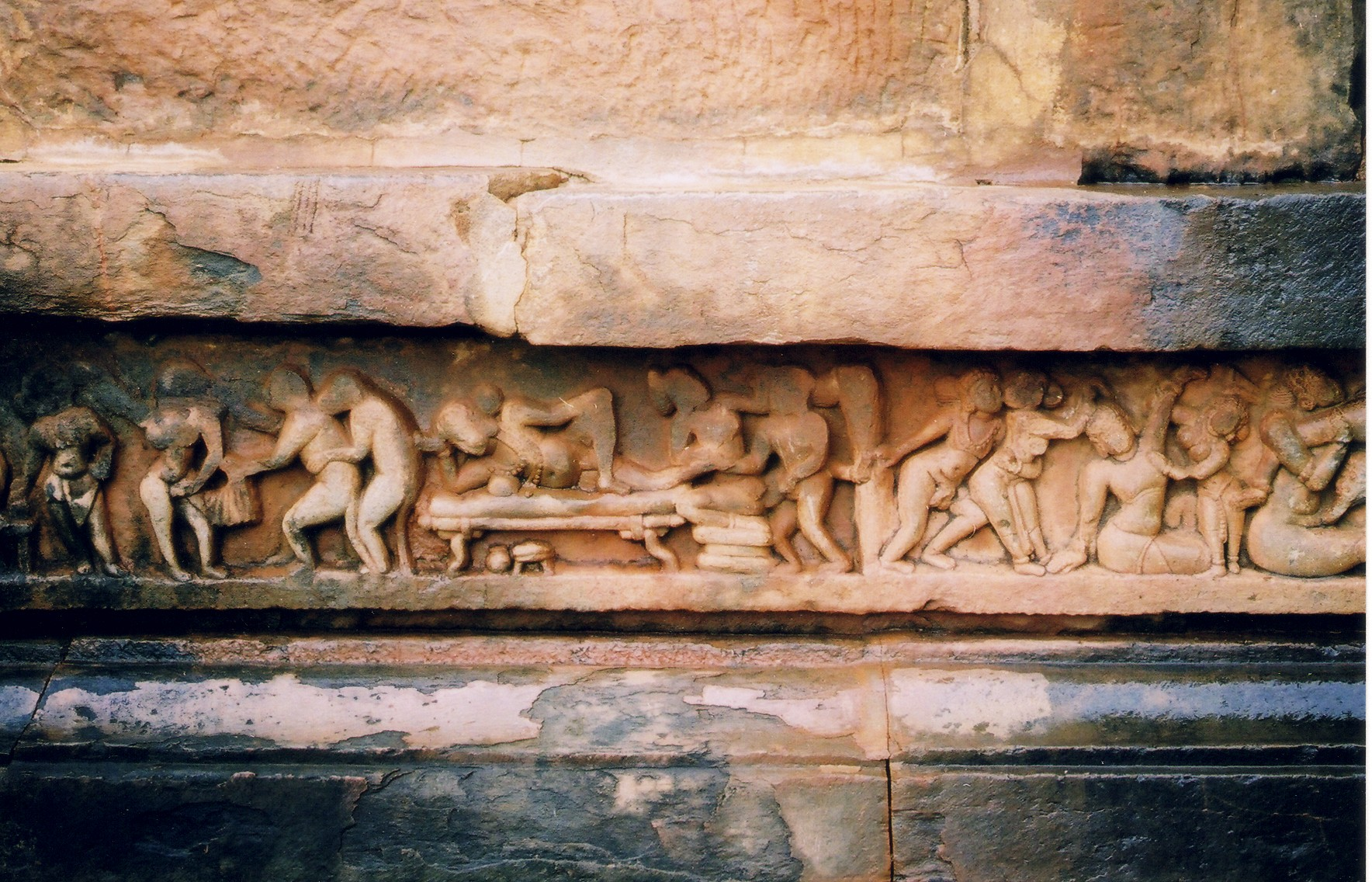
Kamasutra (erotica) art, 1070 CE, Tripurantaka Temple, Shimoga district

This temple is noted for its decorative windows and screens which consist of very intricate perforated stone work. The two sides of the doorway to the shrine have a window panels, each filled entirely by three pairs of nāga figures (snake). The long intertwined and knotted bodies of these nagas create a virtual mesh to fill up the panels. Above the entrance to the shrine is a decorative architrave with sculptures of the Hindu Gods Brahma, Shiva and Vishnu, with Shiva being depicted in his Bhairava form. Other figures here are the dikpalas (the guardians). Some interesting larger sized figure sculptures exist, such as the sculpture of a Hoysala king slaying a lion. This piece of sculpture comes with its own inscription and depicts a hunting expedition in which the king, in the company of his hunting dogs, speared and killed a wild boar. Also depicted is the king on foot, fighting a lion which sprang out of the forest.

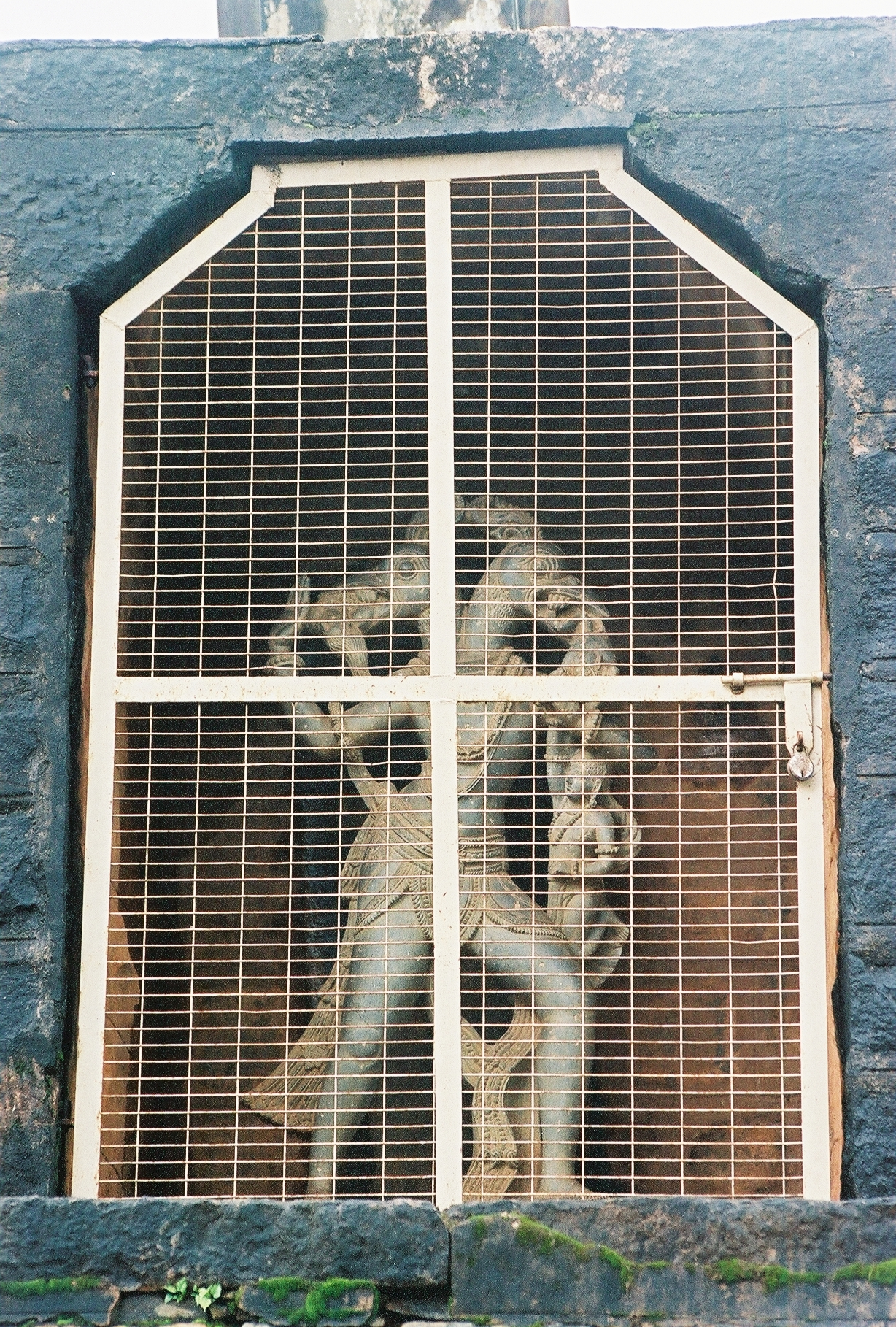
Ganda-Bherunda (Two headed mythical bird) at town centre in Balligavi

An interesting piece of sculpture near the temple in the town centre is the Ganda-Bherunda Stambha ("column of two-headed bird"). The column on which the sculpture stands is about 30 feet (9 m) tall and the shaft is about 15 inches (38 cm) in diameter. The top of the column has an octagonal capital surmounted by a broad slab of stone. Upon this is mounted the statue of the mythical two-headed bird Ganda-Bherunda, which, according to legend was an enemy of elephants and fed on their flesh. The statue has the body of a human standing upright with two bird like heads, looking in opposite directions. In its hands, it holds the prey that it feeds on. An inscription at the base of the column describes its erection in 1047 CE by Chamundaraya Arasa of the Kadamba Dynasty of Banavasi. Legend has it that the column may have been erected to scare away marauding elephants from local plantations.
