= Rameshvara Temple, Koodli =

Ramesvara temple, Kudli
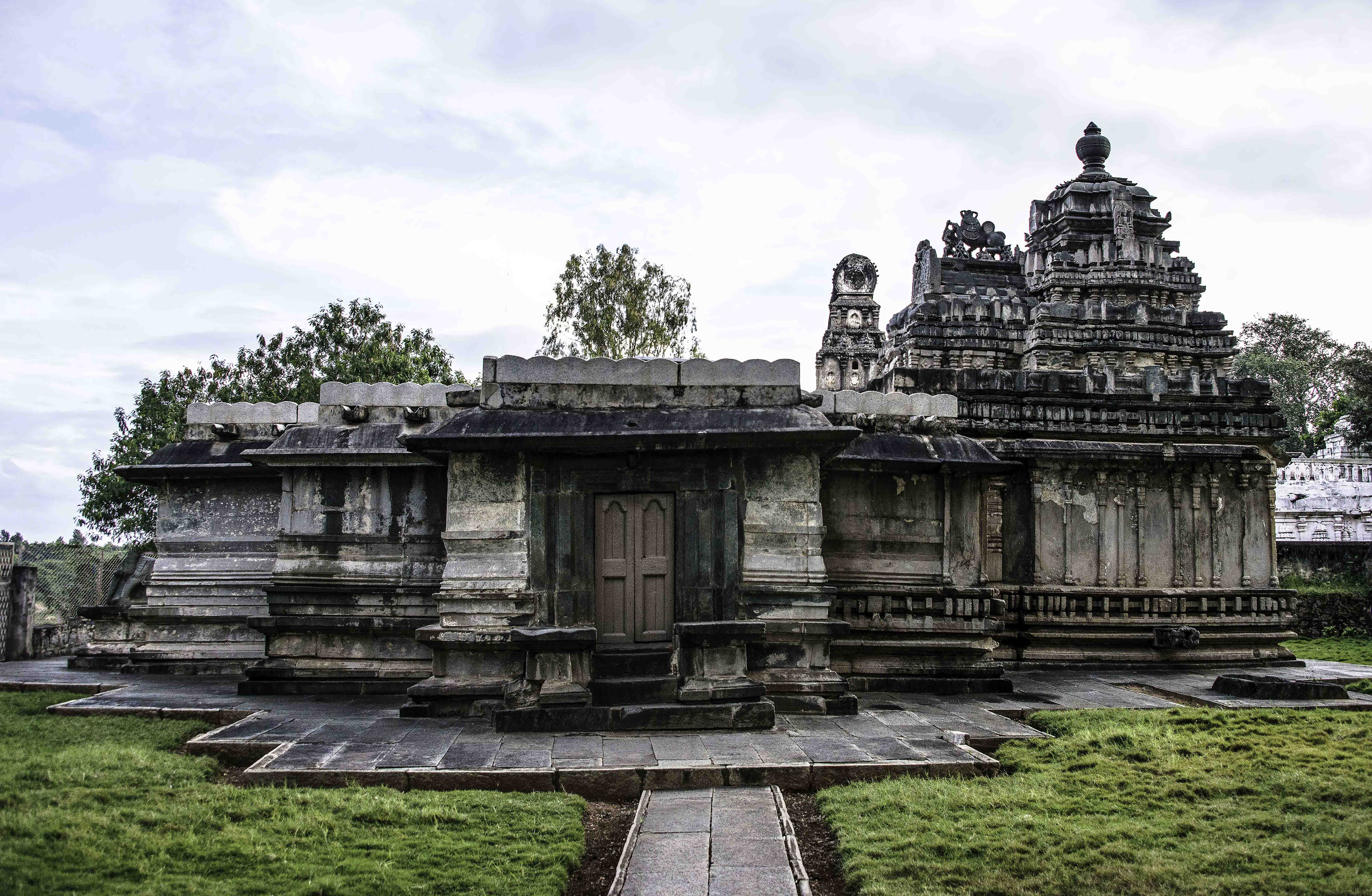

- Location within India Location within Karnataka

Religion
- Affiliation: Hinduism
- District: Shivamogga District
- Deity: Shiva

Location
- Location: Kudli
- State: Karnataka
- Country: India
- Interactive map of Ramesvara temple, Kudli
- Coordinates: 14°00′24.5″N 75°40′28.5″E

Architecture
- Creator: Hoysala dynasty
- Completed: 12th-century

The Rameshvara temple is a 12th-century Shiva temple in Kudli, Shimoga district, Karnataka India. It is an early non-ornate, Hoysala construction with simpler Vesara style. The village of Koodli – also spelled Kudli, Kudali – was a major town through the 14th-century and of great antiquity, with ruins of over eight major Hindu temples and monasteries (Advaita, Dvaita, Shakta). It is located about 18 kilometres (11 mi) north-east of Shimoga city, the district headquarters. The town gets its name because it is situated at the confluence of the Tunga and Bhadra tributaries that form the Tungabhadra river.

The Ramesvara temple has three entrances and a single vimana (sanctum and superstructure) with an open mantapa (hall). It was built with Soap stone. The temple is protected as a monument of national importance by the Archaeological Survey of India.

== History of Koodli ==
Archaeological surveys have unearthed tools and other artifacts which indicate that the region in the vicinity of Koodli (and along the nearby banks of the Tunga and Bhadra rivers) had been under habitation during the Paleolithic, the Neolithic and the Megalithic periods. Written epigraphs such as the Malavalli pillar inscription is available from the period of the Chutu dynasty, a 2nd-century AD vassal of the Shatavahana empire. They were succeeded by the Kadambas of Banavasi in the 4th century, and the Chalukyas of Badami in the 6th century. The Rashtrakutas and the Kalyani Chalukyas gained power in the region in the succeeding centuries. The Hoysala empire made their presence felt in the region from about the 11th century AD. They were followed by the 14th-century Vijayanagara Empire. In the 16th century, the Keladi Nayaka, a Vijayanagara vassal gained independence after the fall of the empire.

== Temple plan ==
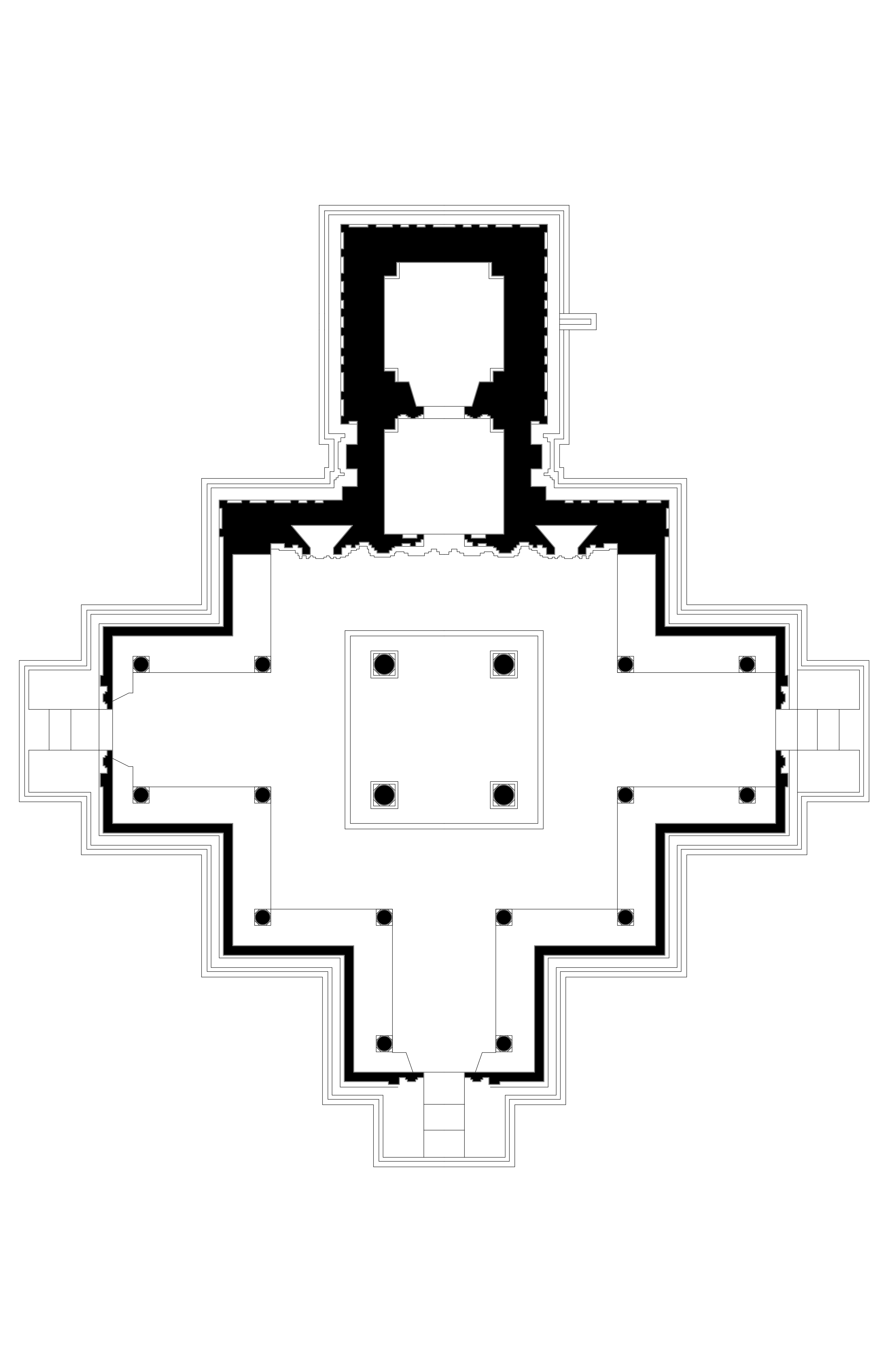
Floor plan of the Ramesvara temple, Kudli.

The shrine is an ekakuta construction (single shrine and tower). The material used is Soap stone, a standard in Hoysala constructions. It is built on an east–west axial plan and comprises a sanctum (garbhagriha) which has a vesara style superstructure (Shikhara), and a vestibule (sukanasi) that connects the closed hall (mantapa) to the sanctum. The vestibule also exhibits a tower which from the outside looks like a low protrusion of the main tower over the shrine. Art historian Gerard Foekema calls it the "nose" of the main tower.

The entrance to the hall is via three porches; at the north, south and east, each of which is supported by four lathe turned polished pillars, a standard feature in Hoysala temples according to art historian Percy Brown. Inside the temple and facing the sanctum is a platform on which is mounted a sculptured image of Nandi the bull (a companion to the god Shiva). The sanctum houses a linga, the universal symbol of the god Shiva.

The platform on which the temple stands, the jagati, comprises five plain moldings (without friezes). The outer walls of the shrine are plain but for regularly spaced slender pilasters. The tower of the shrine has a finial called the kalasha (decorative water-pot like structure). Below the finial is a heavy dome like structure. This is the largest sculptural piece in the temple with a ground surface area of about 2x2 meters and is called the "helmet" or amalaka. Its shape usually follows that of the shrine (square or star shape). Below the dome the tower comprises three tiers, each descending tier increasing in height. On the protruding tower of the vestibule is the royal Hoysala emblem; a warrior stabbing a lion.

== Gallery ==
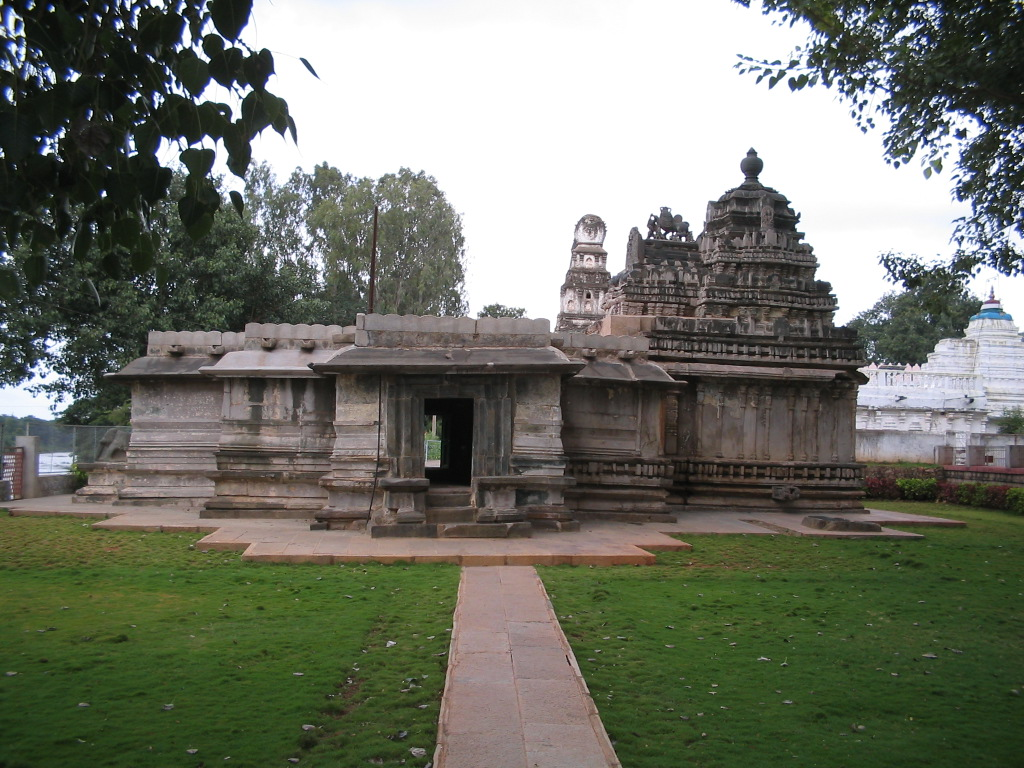
Rear view of the Rameshvara temple, built in the Hoysala style

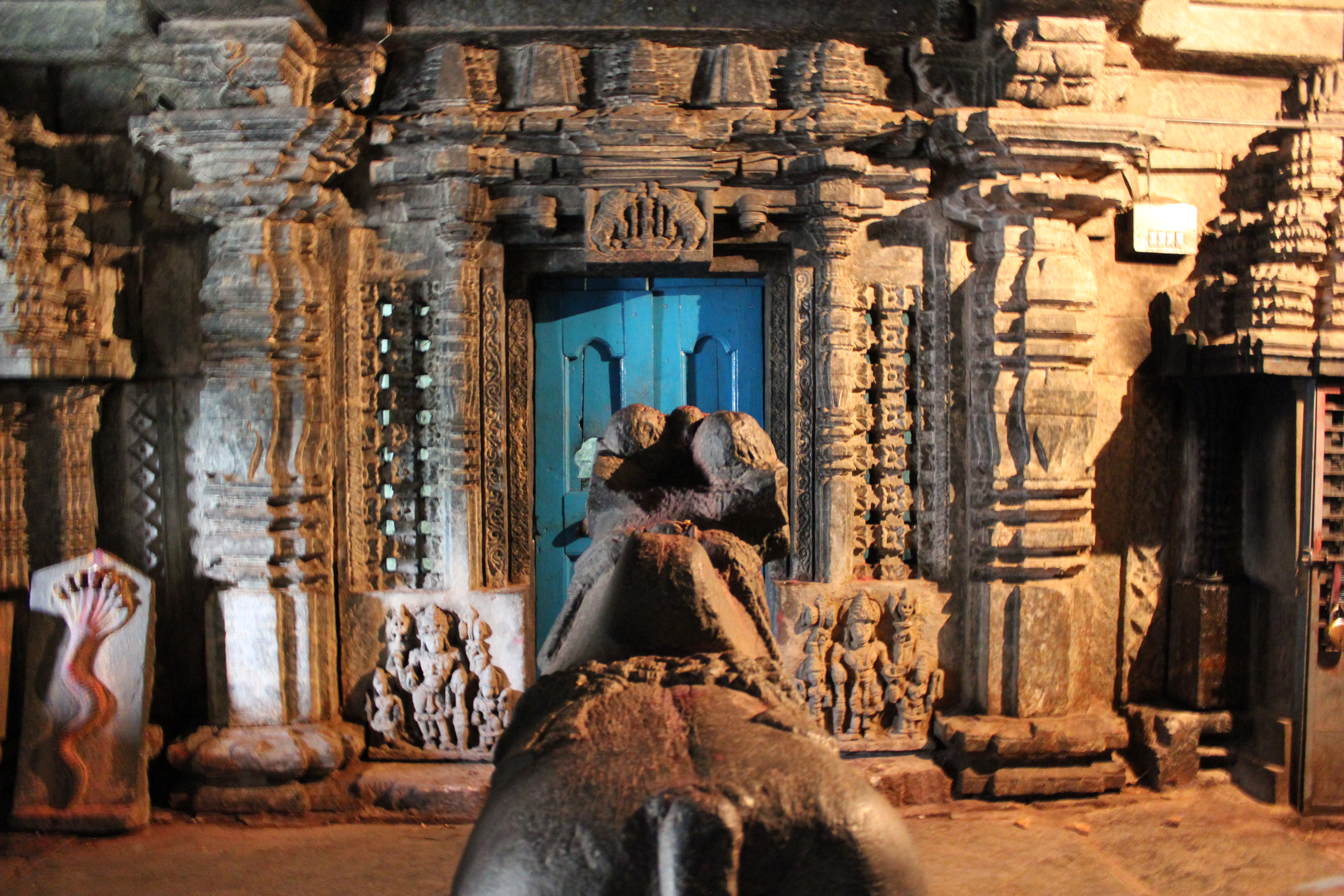
The entrance to the sanctum inside the Rameshvara temple has a decorative doorjamb and lintel relief work

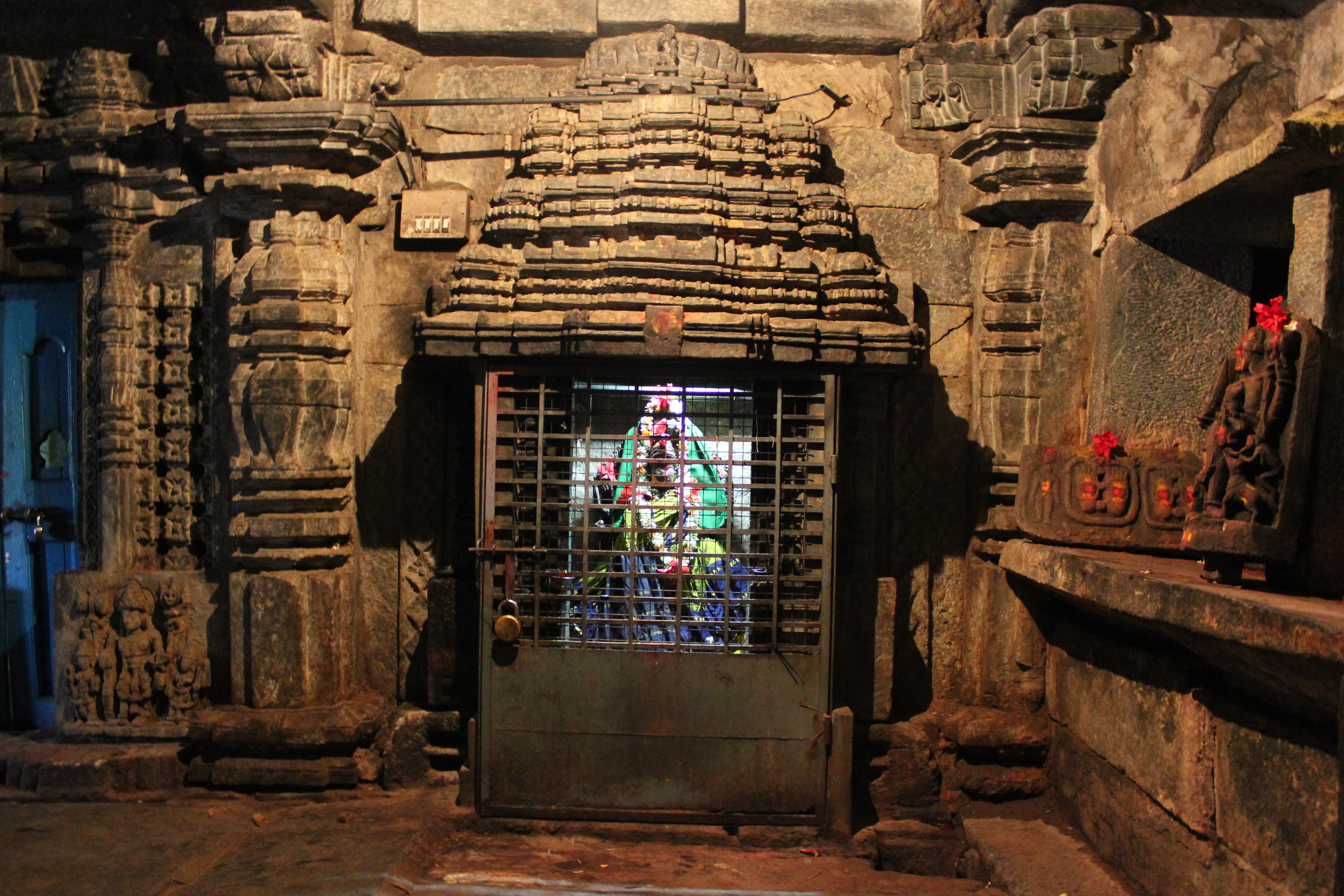
A small shrine inside the mantapa of Rameshvara temple with decorative relief work
