= Saumyakeshava Temple, Nagamangala =

Saumyakeshava
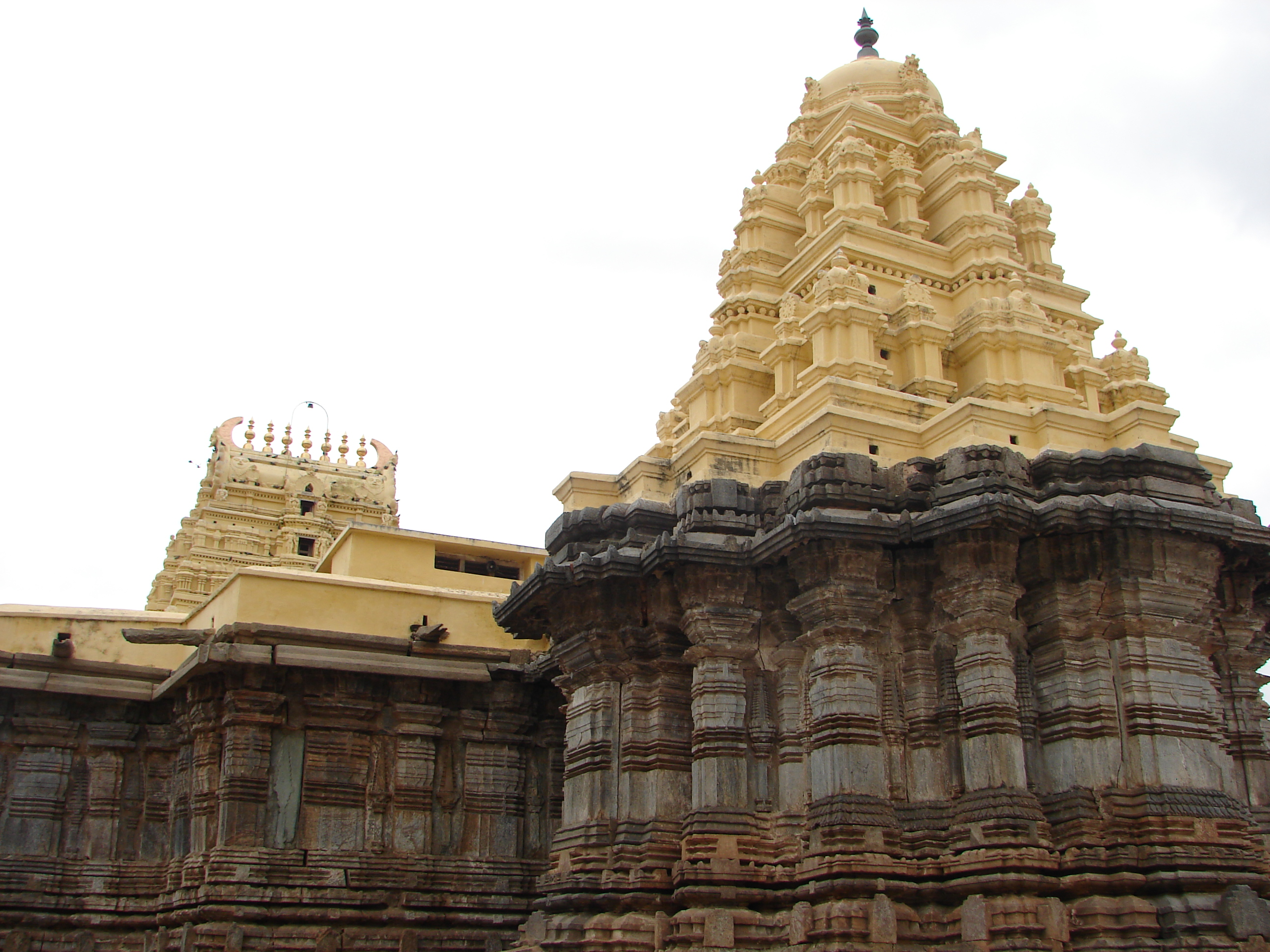
- Saumyakeshava temple (12th century AD) at Nagamangala

Religion
- Affiliation: Hinduism
- District: Mandya

Location
- Location: Nagamangala
- State: Karnataka
- Country: India
- Interactive map of Saumyakeshava
- Coordinates: 12°49′10″N 76°45′13″E

Architecture
- Completed: 12th century AD

The Saumyakeshava temple (also spelt Sauymakesava or Soumyakeshava) at Nagamangala was constructed in the 12th century by the rulers of the Hoysala empire. Nagamangala is a town in the Mandya district of Karnataka state, India. It is located 62 km from the historically important town Mysore, on the Srirangapatna-Sira highway. Historically, Nagamangala came into prominence during the rule of Hoysala King Vishnuvardhana when it became an important center of Vaishnava faith and received patronage from one of his queens, Bommaladevi. During the rule of Veera Ballala II, Nagamangala prospered as an agrahara (place of Hindu religious studies) and had the honorific Vira Ballala Chaturvedi Bhattaratnakara. The temple is protected as a monument of national importance by the Archaeological Survey of India.

== Temple plan ==
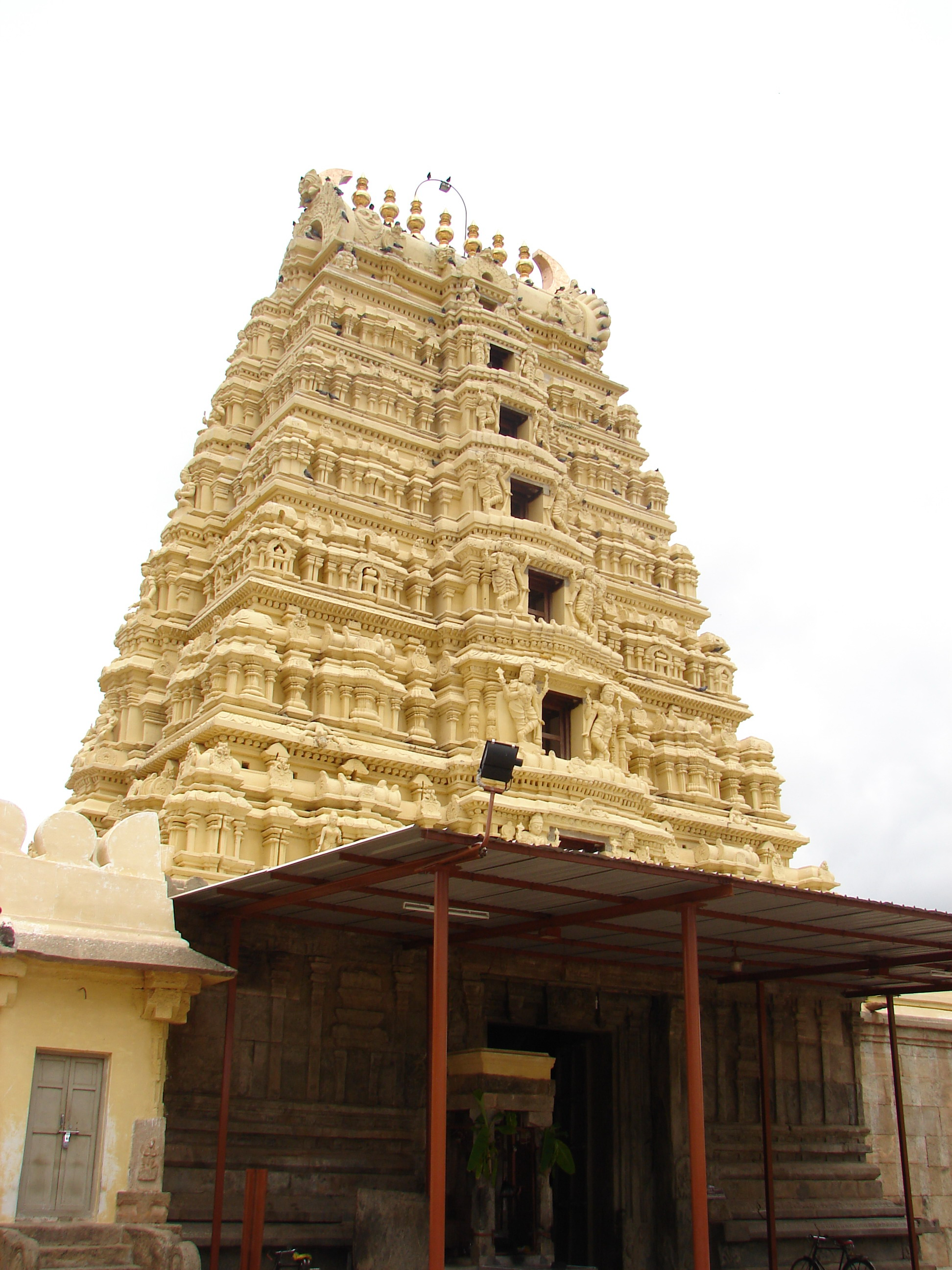
Gopura over main entrance at Saumyakeshava temple, Nagamangala

According to art historian Adam Hardy, the basic plan of the shrine (mulaprasada) is stellate (star shaped). It stands on a platform called jagati and is constructed with Soap stone material. According to historian Percy Brown this is a Hoysala innovation. Overall, the temple exhibits the nagara features (northern Indian influence) seen in a few other Hoysala temples such as in the Sadasiva Temple, Nuggehalli. According to art historians Gerard Foekema and Percy Brown, nagara features are seldom seen in Hoysala temples. The temple is a large structure and has received patronage by multiple dynasties and reveals features of the later day Vijayanagara Empire whose rulers added the entrance and tower over it (mahadvara) and bounding walls (prakara). Some post-Vijayanagara features are also visible. The tower over the entrance (gopuram) is a 7-story tall lime and brick structure that is adorned by Hindu gods, goddesses and other decorative structures in stucco.

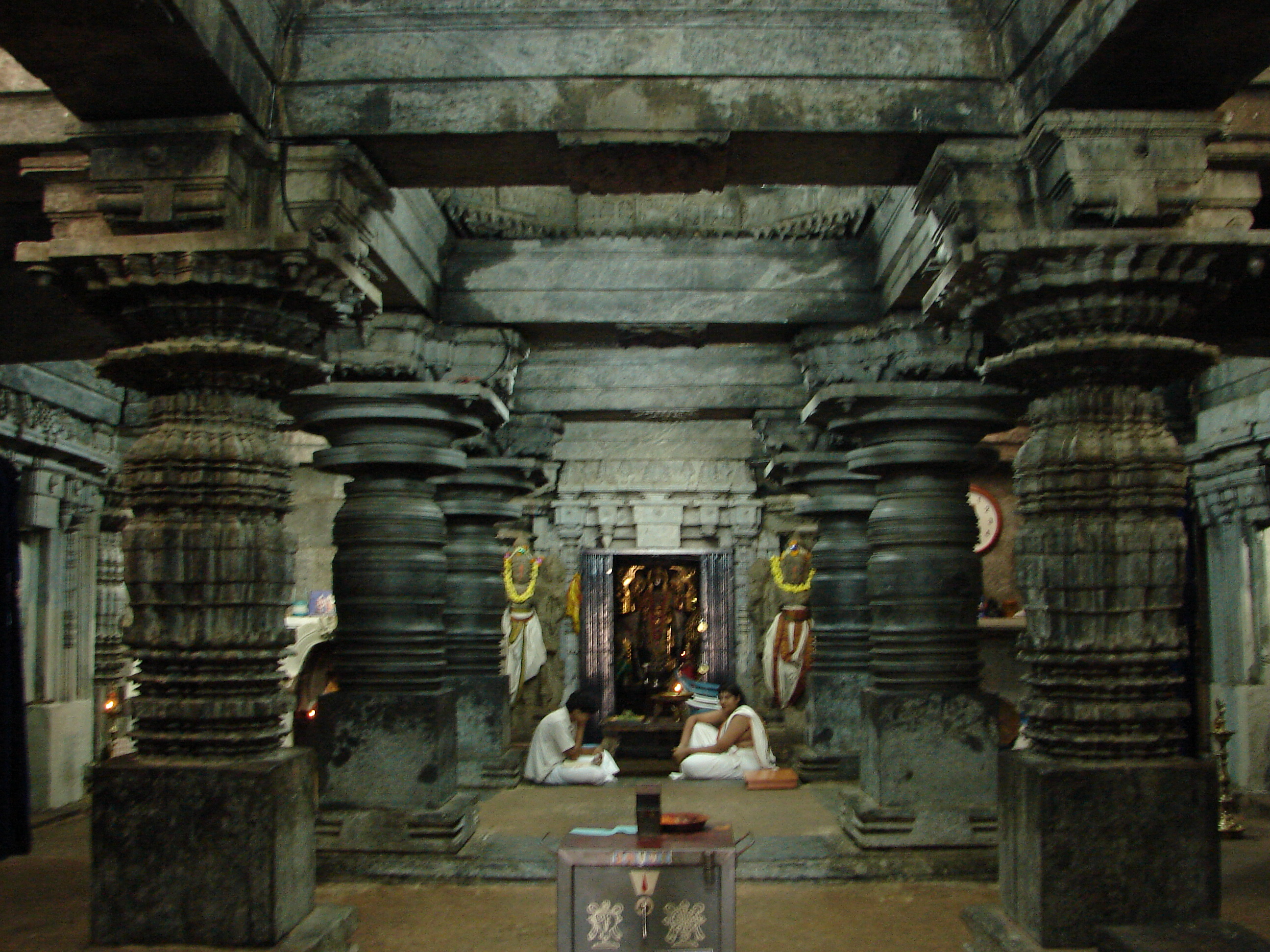
Lathe turned pillars and view of the mantapa and sanctum at Saumyakeshava temple at Nagamangala

The temple is three shrined (trikutachala), has a garbhagriha (sanctum), and a vestibule (antarala) that connects the sanctum to the a closed mantapa (inner hall, navaranga) which opens into a large pillared gathering hall (mahamantapa). According to Percy Brown and Gerard Foekema, these are standard features in a Hoysala temple. The closed hall has two lateral shrines, one in the north and the other in the south. To the east, the large hall opens onto the platform that is meant for clockwise Circumambulation by devotees since the inside of the temple does not provide any such feature. On the platform, the base of the temple (called adhisthana) consists of moldings that take the stellate form of sanctum but become staggered square at the mahamantapa. The outer wall of the shrine and the large hall are single pilastered turreted walls. The tower over the shrine (shikhara) is plain without the typical ornamentation giving the temple as a whole an austere look. The temple gets its name from the "serene" (lit, "Saumya") six feet tall image of Keshava, a form of the Hindu god Vishnu that stands on a garuda (eagle) pedestal. The roof of the closed mantapa is supported by lathe turned pillars, a standard feature in Hoysala constructions. These pillars divide the ceiling into "bays" (four central pillars create 9 bays in the closed hall) that are exceptionally well treated.

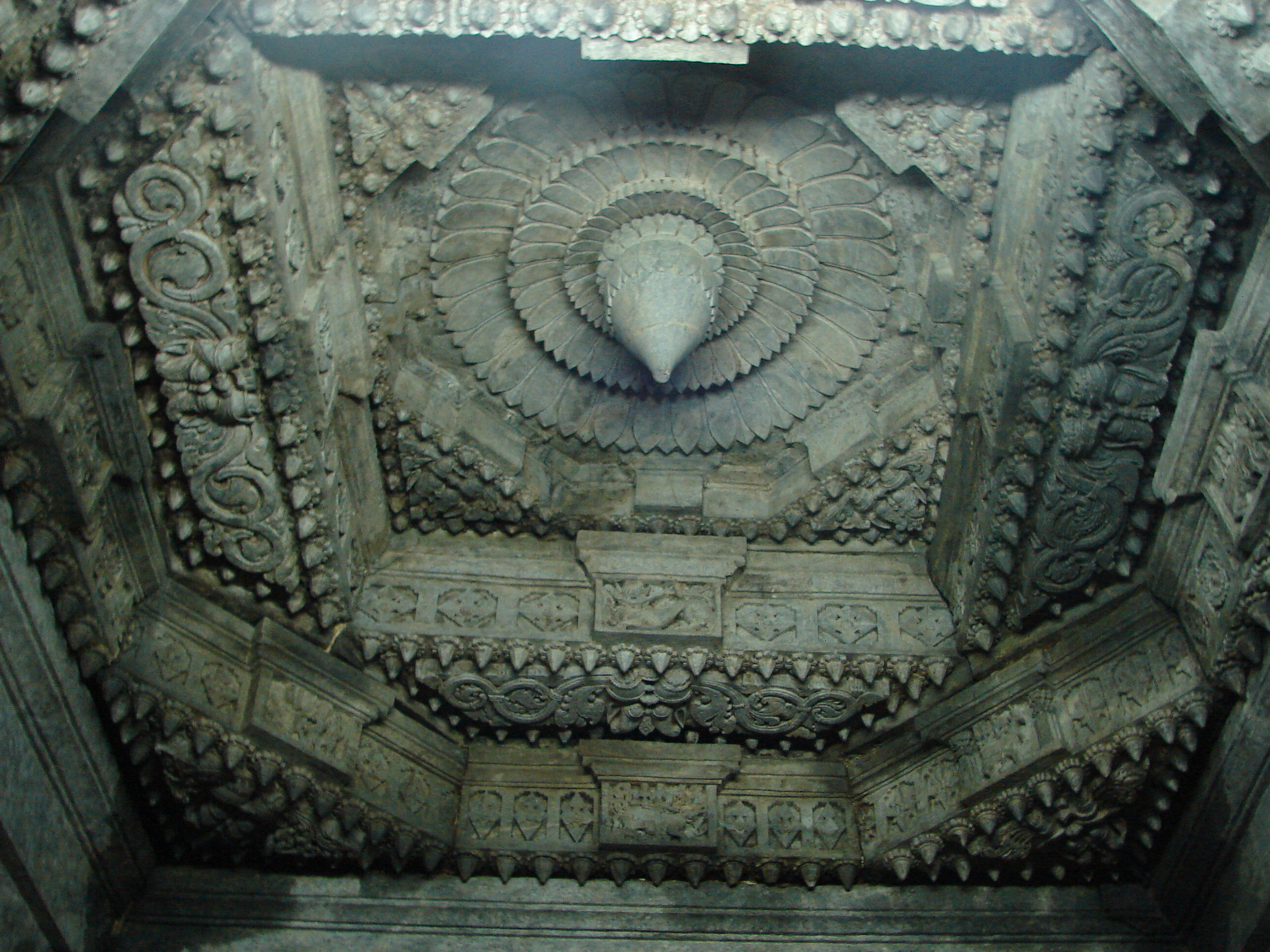
Decorative "bay" ceiling in the mantapa of Saumyakeshava temple, Nagamangala
