= Colonel Bailey's Dungeon =

Prison in Srirangapatna, India

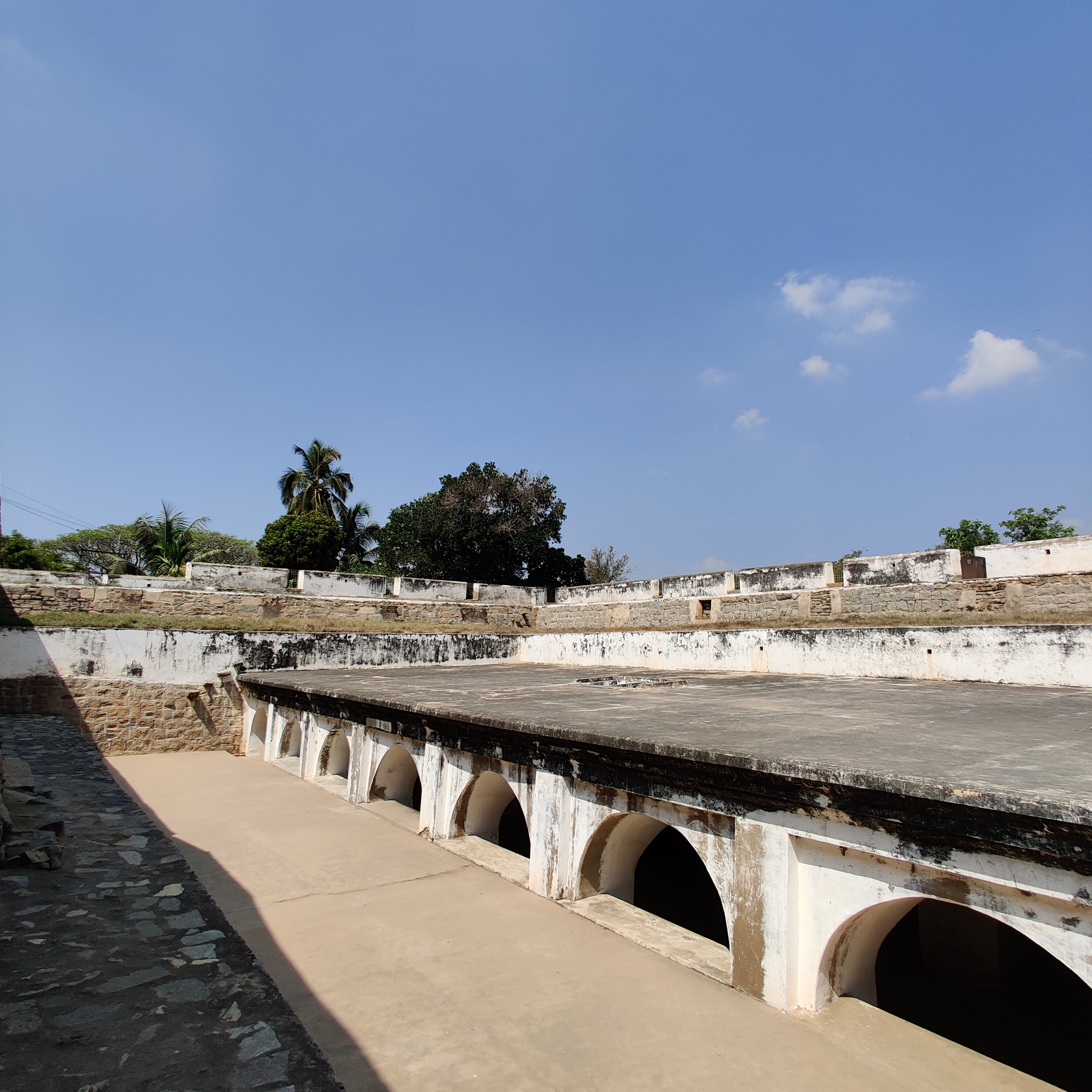
Colonel Bailey's Dungeon- A ground level view

Colonel Bailey's Dungeon in Srirangapatna was the place where Tipu Sultan, ruler of Mysore Kingdom used to imprison all the British officers who were captured during the Anglo–Mysore Wars fought by him and earlier by his father Hyder Ali. Colonel Bailey, also spelled Baillie, fell into Tipu's hands in the Second Anglo-Mysore War at the Battle of Pollilur (1780), and spent several months in the dungeons of Srirangapatna. It is near the burial memorial of Tipu Sultan and is surrounded by gardens on all four sides. Colonel William Bailey (Baillie) was the only British officer who died in that place in 1782 as he could not sustain the inhuman conditions, and so the dungeon was later named after him. In this context it is said that prisoners were tied to fixtures in the stone slab of the dungeon and were immersed in water up to their necks.

== Location ==
Colonel Bailey's Dungeon, also spelled Baillie's Dungeon, is in the northern part of the rocky island of Srirangapatna (5 kilometres (3.1 mi) long and 1 kilometre (0.62 mi) wide), on the Cauvery River, 15 kilometres (9.3 mi) from Mysore city. It is an underground prison built in the 18th century during the reign of Tipu Sultan, the then ruler of Mysore Kingdom. It is a white-walled dungeon used to hold prisoners of war including the British officers and soldiers. It is in the Northern and North-eastern part of the fort wall that surrounded the capital city of Srirangapatna of the Mysore Kingdom, and is to the Northern side of the Srirangapattana temple. It is next to an oblong bastion which had heavy battery in the past, which is called Sultan Bateri. Below the bastion is the dungeon, obscured from any passers' view.

== History ==
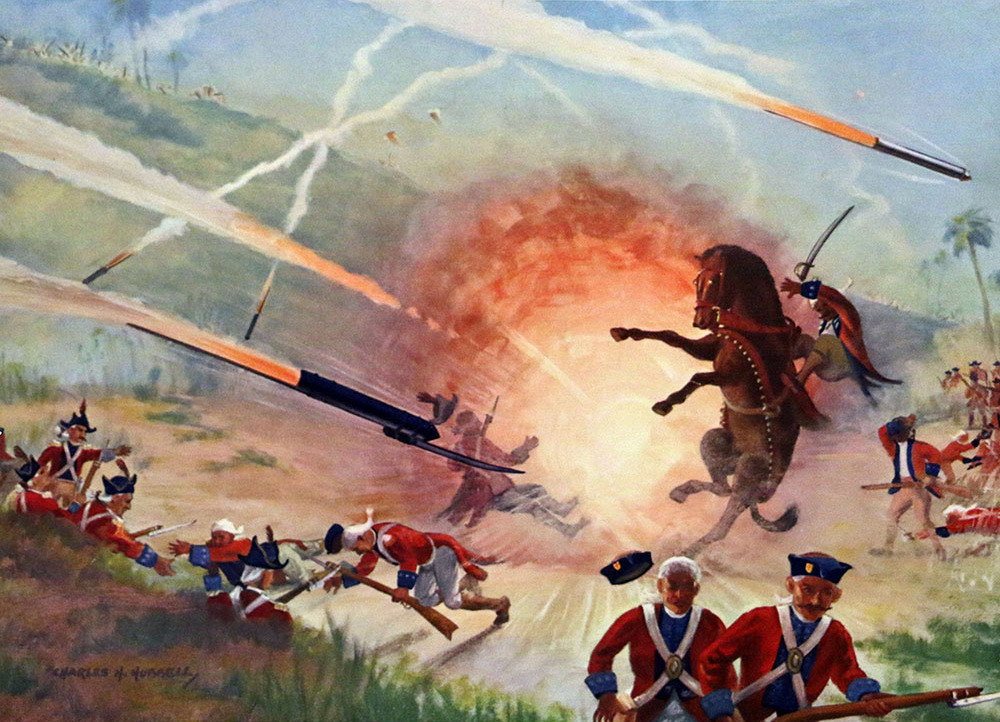
Rocket warfare during the Second Anglo-Mysore War where Colonel Bailey was taken prisoner of war, along with many other British soldiers

The town of Srirangapatna, of historical significance, served as the capital of the Wadiyar dynasty of Mysore Kingdom, as well as their supplanters Hyder Ali and Tipu Sultan who ruled from 1762 to 1782 and 1782 to 1799 respectively. The capital city was surrounded by the ramparts of Srirangapatna Fort built in an irregular zone at the western tip of the island, and measures about 5 square kilometres (1.9 sq mi). The polygonal bastions and turreted parapets surrounded by broad moats were the work of French engineers in the service of Tipu Sultan. The vaulted dungeons built by the Sultans, Colonel Bailey's Dungeon, Inman Dungeon and Sultan bateri on the northern part of the island were primarily meant to imprison the army personnel of the British army who fought against Hydder Ali and Tipu in the Mysore wars.

Between 1761 and 1799 CE, Srirangapatna was the centre of South Indian political activity. Four Wars were fought by the Sultans against the British forces of the East India Company, first two by Hyder Ali and the last two by Tipu Sultan. The Second Anglo- Mysore War (1780 to 1784), also known as the Battle of Pollilur, was fought on 10 September 1780 when Tipu Sultan participated with his father. Earlier to this, Tipu had in fact fought for his father, between 1774 and 1778 and 1780 to 1784, and helped in regaining all the territory from the Marathas which he had lost during previous wars. The Sultan's army consisted of 10,000 soldiers and several guns. The opposing British army was led by Col. Bailey. Unfortunately for the British, they lost the battle and Colonel Bailey and some other soldiers were taken prisoners of war, and taken to Srirngapatna to be incarcerated in the specially built dungeons there.

Initially, Colonel Bailey along with some officers were confined to a choultry, a rest house in the parade ground in front of the demolished palaces of Mysore Rajas. Thereafter, they were shifted to the underground vault or dungeon opposite to the Railway office, a little to the west of the gate called Krishn-diddi on the northern walls of the fort. There Bailey and his soldiers were chained to the stone holes, stripped naked and subject to inhuman barbarity. The defeat of Bailey was stated to be a major debacle which was the "severest blow that the English ever sustained in India". British officers taken prisoners in subsequent battles fought by Tipu, such as Captains Baird and Rulay, Colonel Braithwhite, Sampson, Frazer and Lindsay were also incarcerated in this dungeon.

== Features of the dungeon ==
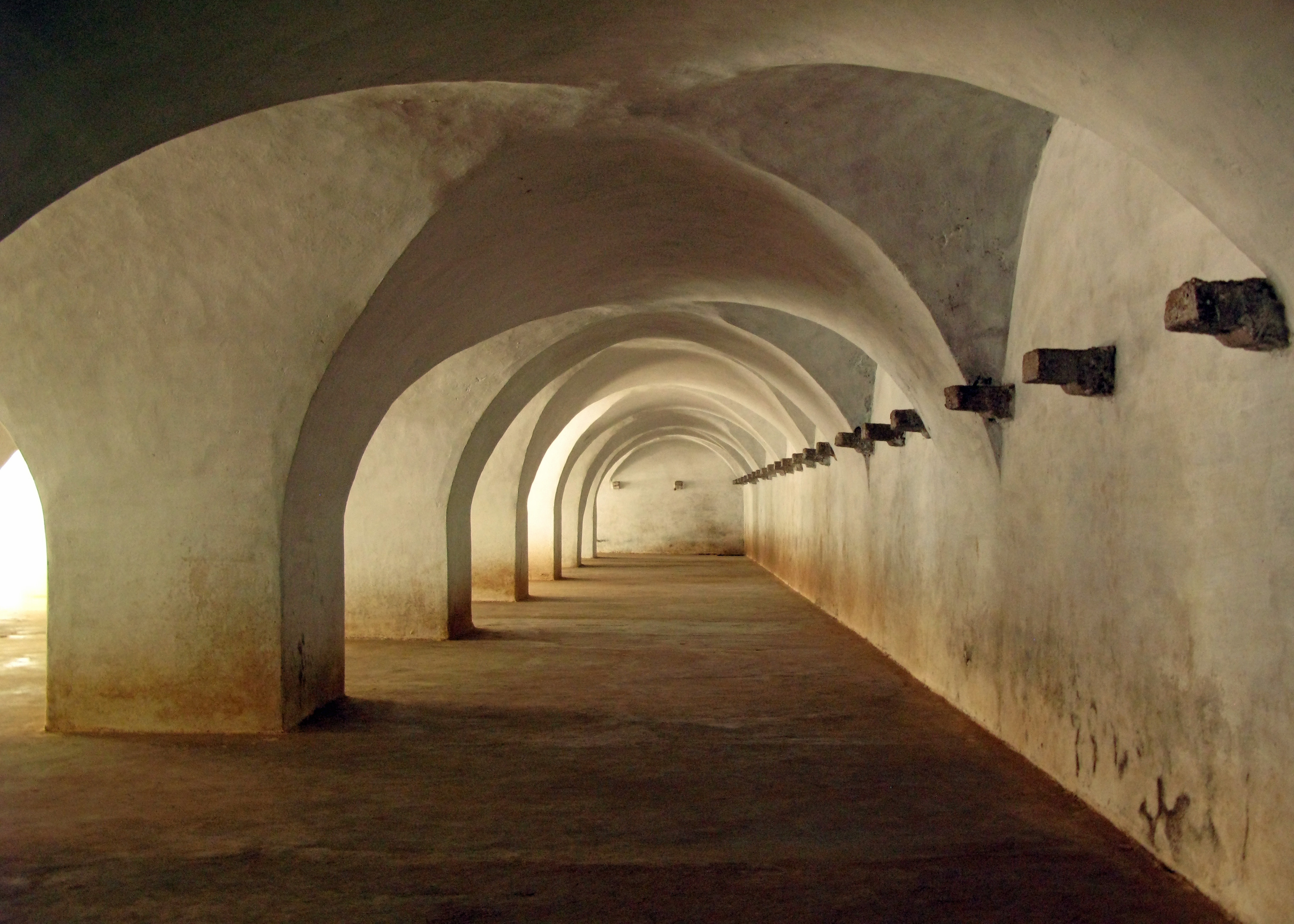
Interior view of underground arches of Col. Bailey's Dungeon

This unique underground dungeon is built, below the Sultan Bateri of the fort, with brick and lime mortar masonry and is architecturally eye catching as it has a series of symmetric arches which lights up the chamber. The particular aspect of the arches is that it appears like a masjid's tomb, bulbous in shape on the side and amalgamating with the ceiling, thus facilitating prisoners to stand to their full height. The dungeon measures 30.5 metres (100 ft) x 12.2 metres (40 ft) and abuts the fort wall, and has a raised platform on which stone slabs of shoulder height with holes fixed with hooks and chain devices are fitted to tie down the prisoners. It is approached from the ground level through a few steps. Even though the roof of the dungeon was strong, in the last battle fought by Tipu Sultan in 1799 when Srirangapatna was bombarded by the British forces a large canon had pierced the roof creating a large hole can be seen even today and the canon is also on display. In the context of treatment of prisoners in this dungeon, it is said that prisoners were tied to fixtures in the stone slab of the dungeon and were immersed in water up to their necks.

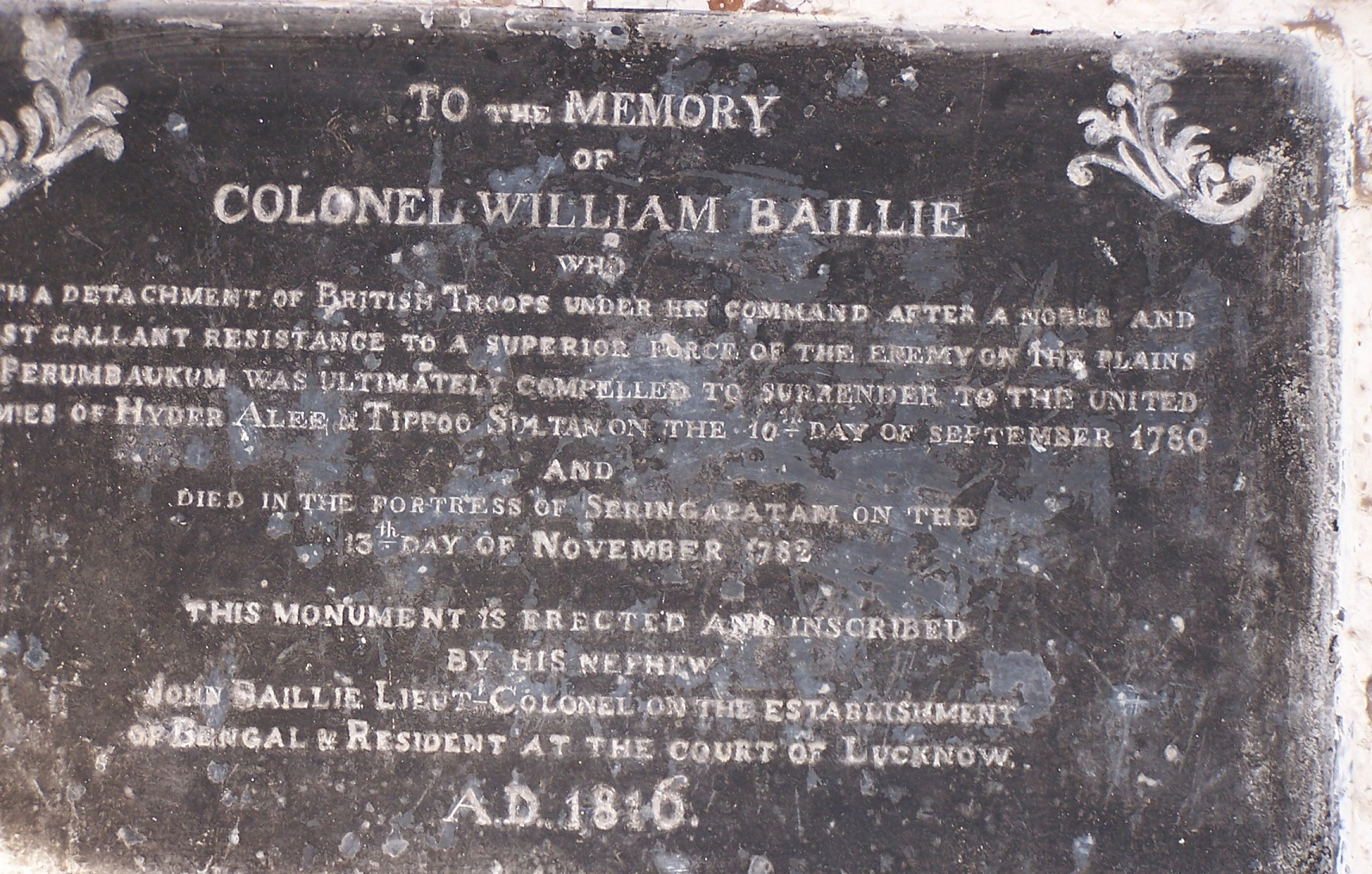
Plaque of the William Baillie Memorial who died in the dungeon on 13 November 1782

Col. Bailey died in this dungeon on 13 November 1782 following a prolonged sickness, and the dungeon was thereafter named after him. Much later to Colonel Bailey's death, a monument with an inscription was erected in 1816 in the near by Lalbagh in his memory by his nephew Lieut. Col. John Bailey, the then Resident at the court of Lucknow.

== Access ==
Colonel Bailey's Dungeon is well connected by road, rail and air. It is on the National Highway between Bengaluru and Mysore - 19 kilometres (12 mi) from Mysore and 125 kilometres (78 mi) from Bengaluru.
