= Kaitabheshvara Temple, Kubatur =

Kaitabheshvara Temple
- Hindu temple
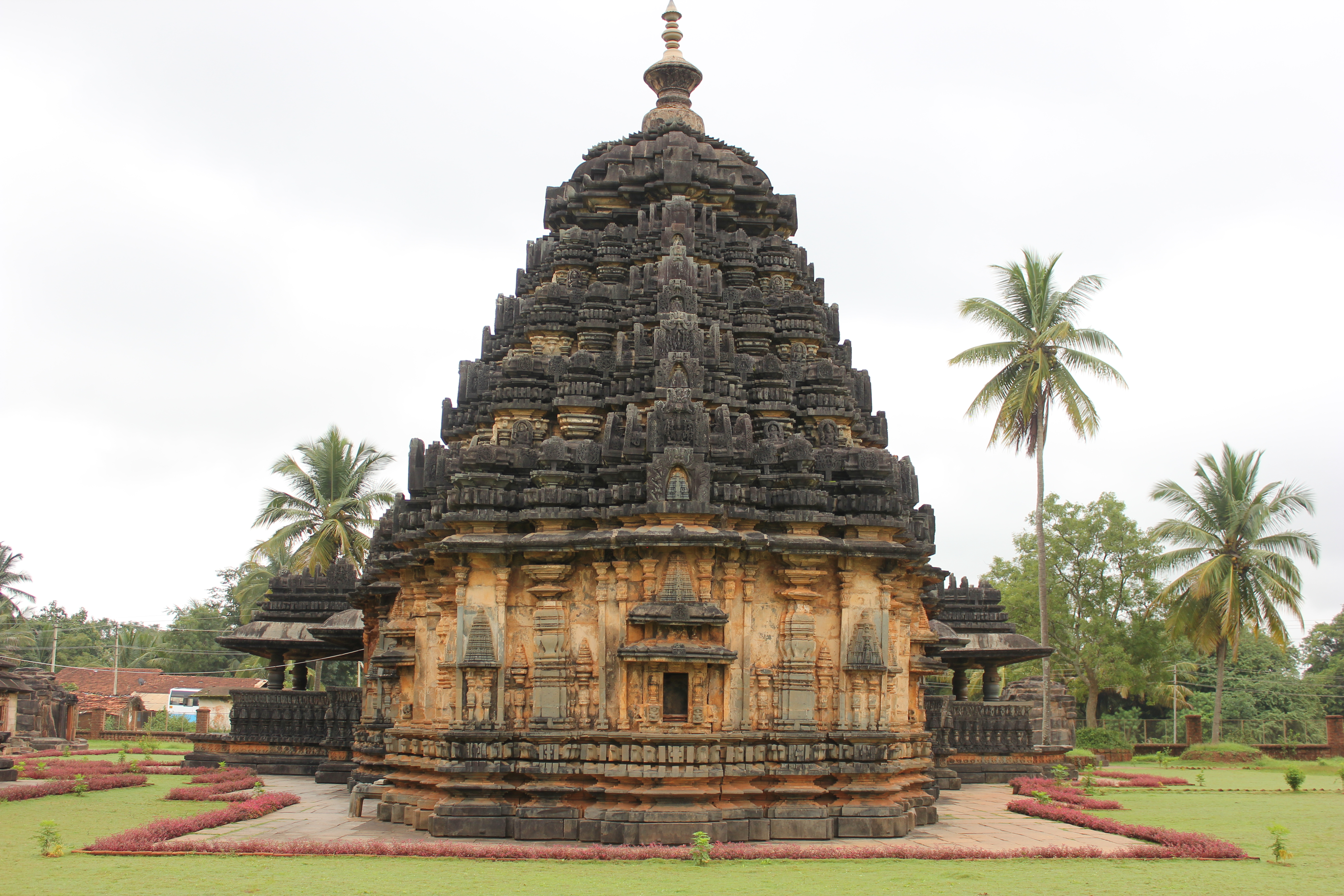
- Kaitabheshvara temple (1100 AD) at Kubatur in Shimoga district

- Location in Karnataka, India
- Coordinates: 14.5648100°N 75.1523400°E
- Country: India
- State: Karnataka
- District: Shimoga District

Languages
  - Official: Kannada
- Time zone: UTC+5:30 (IST)

The Kaitabheshvara temple (also spelt Kaitabhesvara or Kaitabheshwara, known also as Kotisvara) is located in the town of Kubatur (also spelt Kubattur or Kuppattur, and called Kuntalanagara or Kotipura in ancient inscriptions), near Anavatti in the Shimoga district of Karnataka state, India. The temple was constructed during the reign of Hoysala King Vinayaditya around 1100 AD. The Hoysala ruling family was during this time a powerful feudatory of the imperial Western Chalukya Empire ruled by King Vikramaditya VI. According to the Archaeological Survey of India, the architectural signature of the temple is mainly "Chalukyan". Art historian Adam Hardy classifies the style involved in the construction of the temple as "Later Chalukya, non mainstream, far end of spectrum". The building material used is soapstone The temple is protected as a monument of national importance by the Archaeological Survey of India.

== Temple plan ==
The temple has a single square shaped shrine (garbhagriha) with an east–west orientation, a vestibule that connects the sanctum (cella or vimana) to the main large open hall (mukhamantapa) that has a staggered square plan and can be entered from five sides; two lateral and one each in the north, south, and east. The walls of the shrine and vestibule stand on a base (adisthana) that is composed of five moldings. The superstructure over the sanctum is four-tiered (chatustala arpita). It is crowned by a large domed roof that looks like a "helmet" (amalaka) and whose shape follows the shape of the shrine (square in this case). The "helmet" is the largest sculptural piece in the temple, it is beautifully carved and well decorated. Atop the dome is a beautiful water-pot like stone structure (kalasha) that forms the pinnacle of the tower. In case of those temples where the original pinnacle is lost, a metallic structure is normally used as a replacement. The tower over the vestibule (sukanasi or "nose"), which is actually a protrusion of the main tower, faces east. The open mantapa is large and its ceiling is supported by massive lathe-turned circular pillars. The relief work in the central panel of the hall ceiling is particularly noteworthy and the overall preservation of the temple is good.

== Sculptures and decoration ==
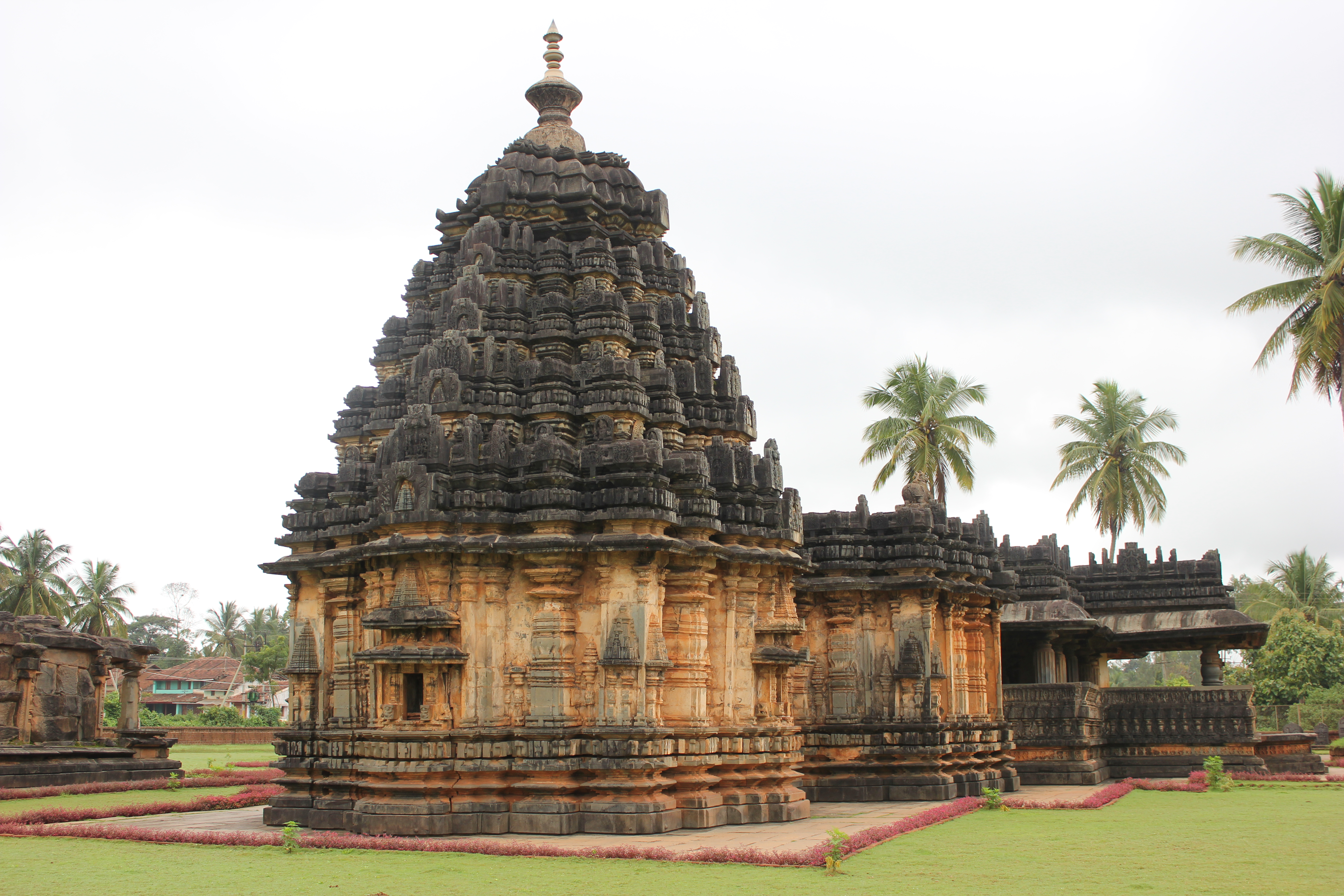
A rear profile view of Kaitabheshvara temple at Kubatur

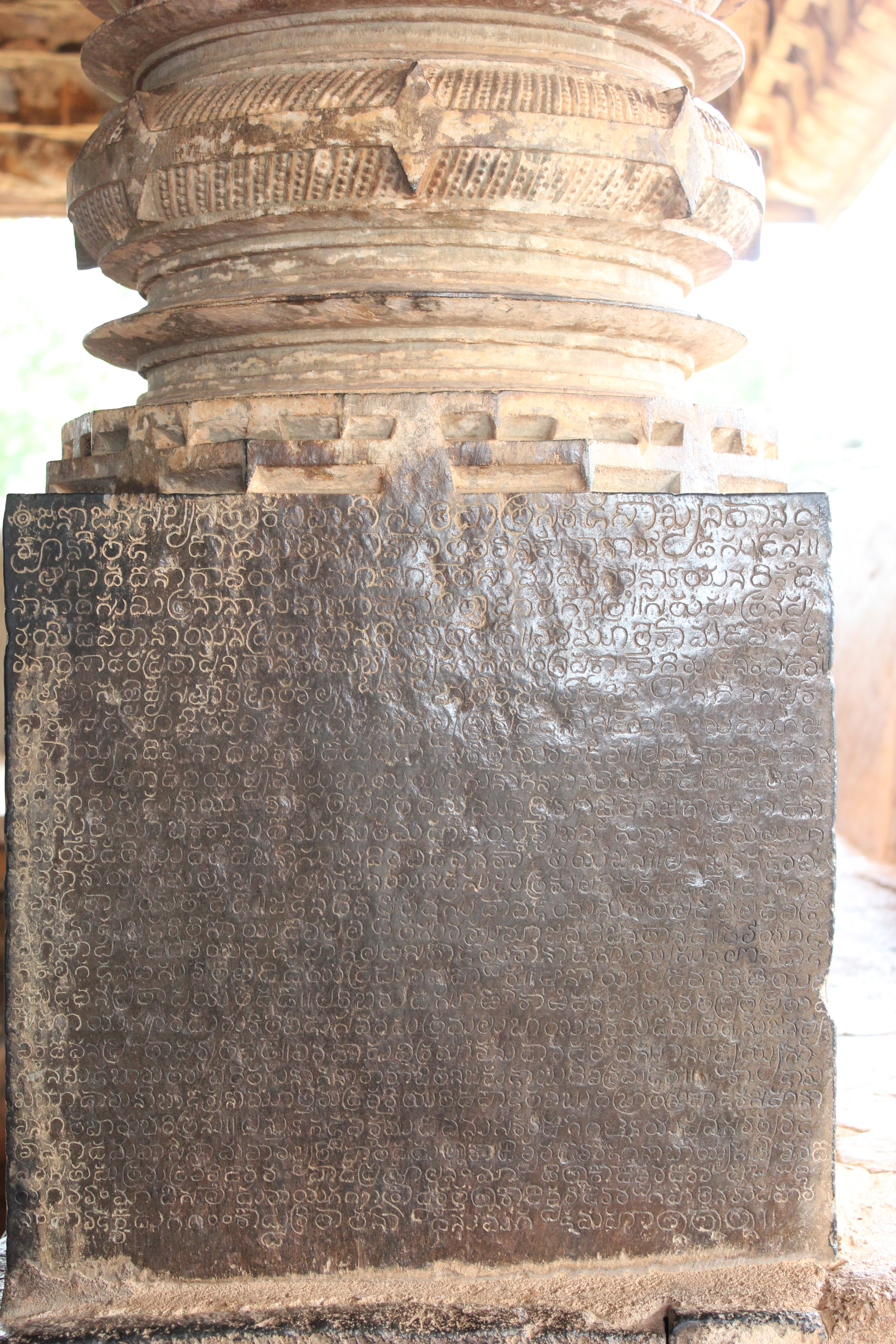
Old Kannada inscription (1241-1249 A.D.) at Kaitabheshvara temple

The sculptural motifs and friezes, the decorative articulation, the shape of superstructure (shikhara) and the design of pillars in this temple are those commonly found in other Western Chalukyan temples. On the outer walls of the shrine and vestibule are pilasters of two types; full length pilasters that reach up to the heavy though inconspicuous eaves, and half length pilasters that support miniature decorative towers (Aedicula) of various kinds (such as latina and bhumija). The sculptures of Mahishamardini ( a form of the Hindu goddess Durga, Bhairava ( a form of the god Shiva), and Ganesha can be found on the main tower. The base of the outerwall of the open hall (mukhamandapa) has decorative motifs, pilasters surmounted by miniature decorative pyramidal shaped turrets with gargoyle faced (kirtimukha) scrolls. The seating area in the hall (kakshasana) is treated with floral decorations. The pillars of the mandapa are characteristically circular, polished and lathe-turned, with those pillars that are mounted on a platform (jagati) being fluted and shorter in height. The ceilings are ornate and the typical Hoysala style parapet over the eaves has sculptural representations of Ugra Narasimha, Varaha (the boar, an incarnation of the god Vishnu), Garuda (the eagle) and Keshava (a form of the god Krishna). The doorjamb at the entrance to the vestibule and sanctum are typically ornate and Hoysala in character, with the lintel displaying a sculpture of "Gajalakshmi" (the Hindu goddess Lakshmi with elephants on either side).

== Gallery ==
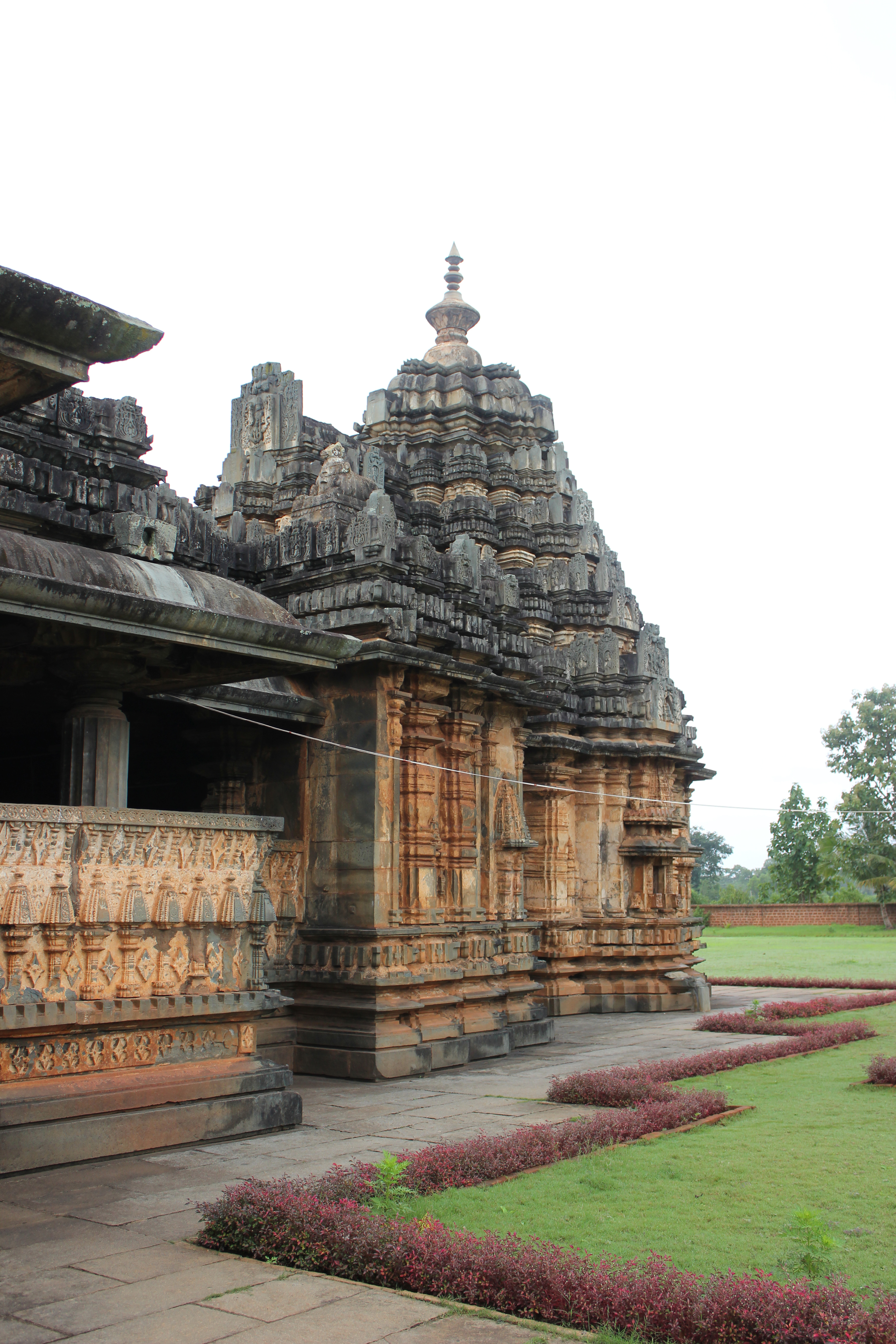
Profile of mantapa (hall) and shrine outer wall decor in Kaitabheshvara temple at Kubatur

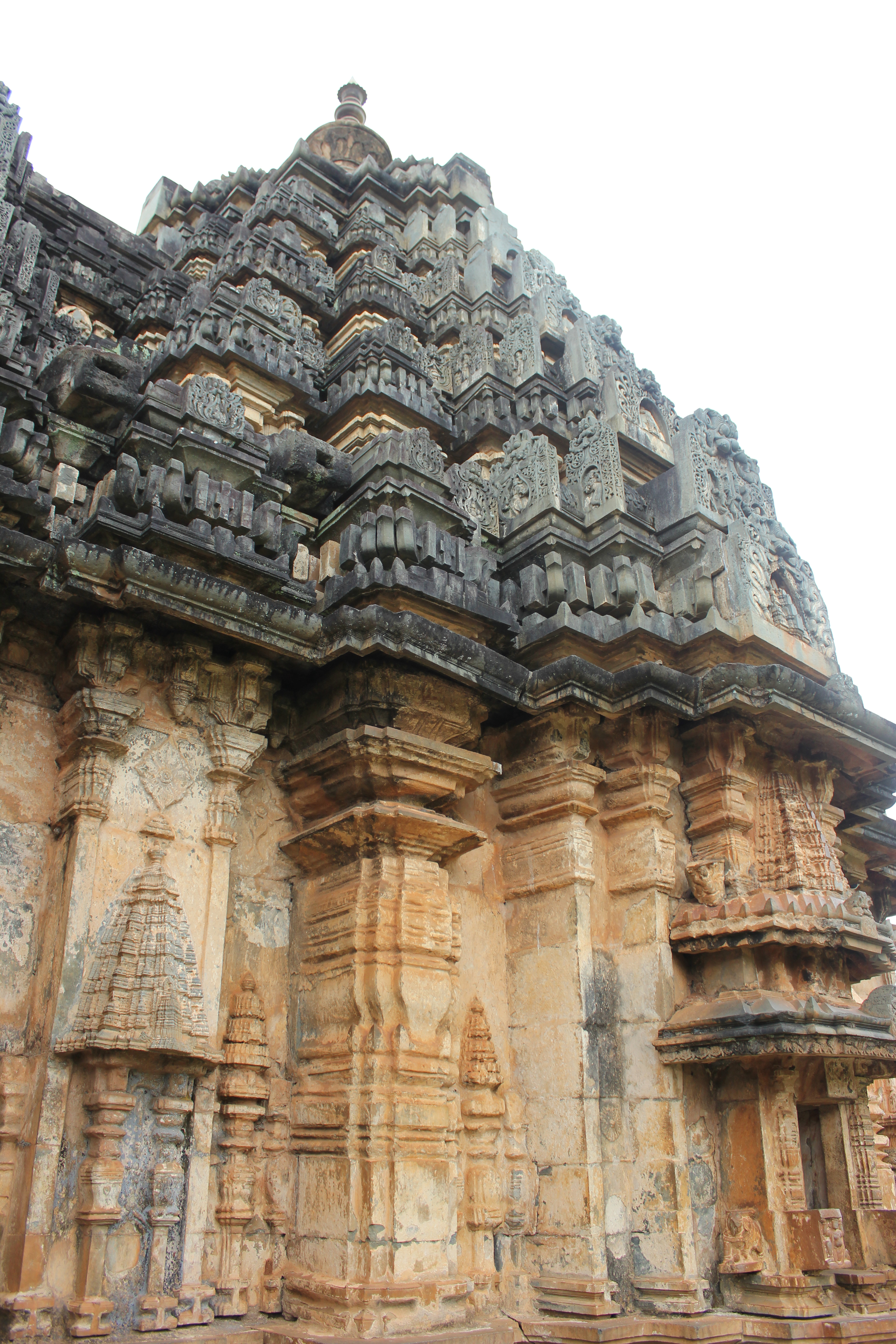
Vesara style tower over shrine in Kaitabheshvara temple at Kubatur

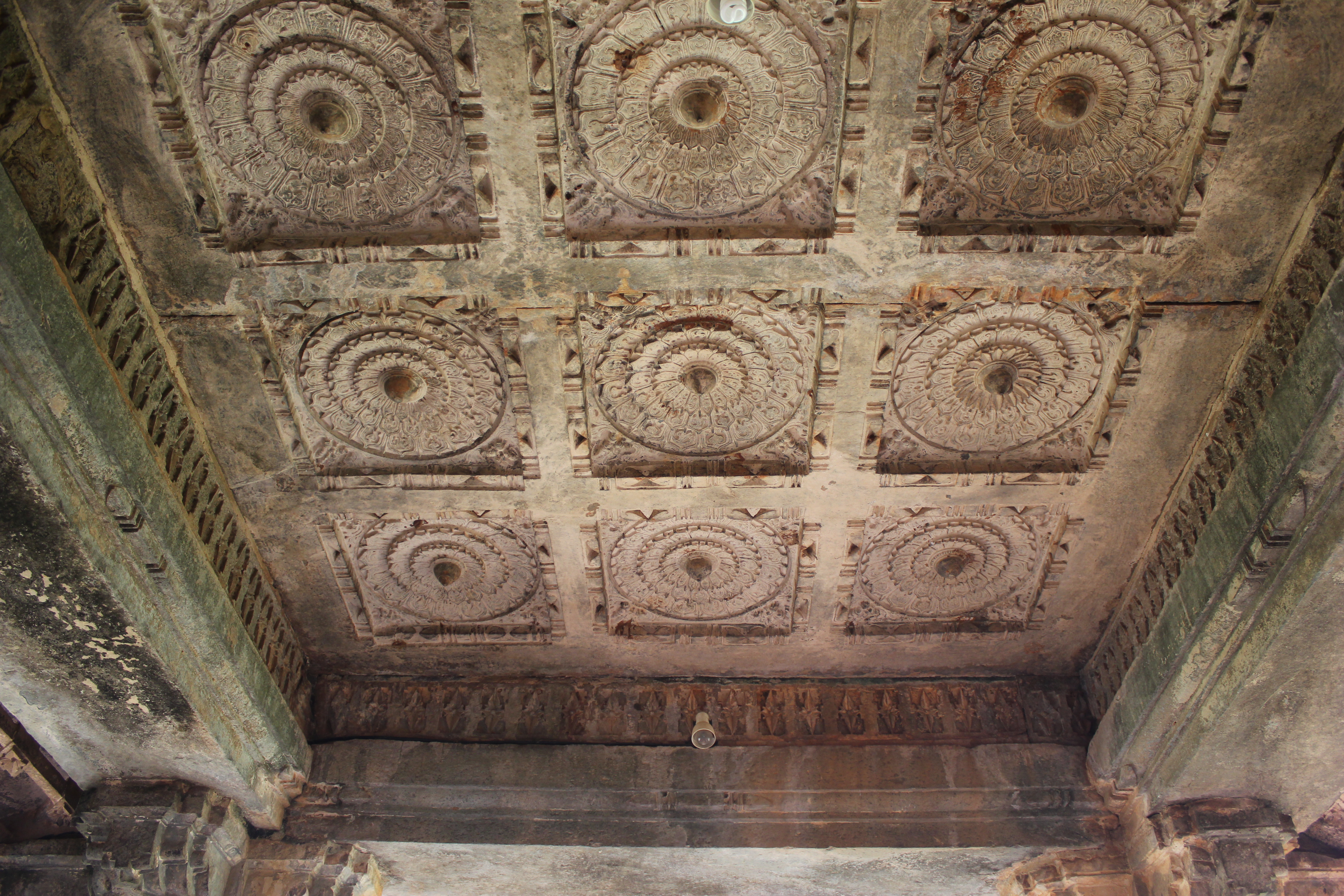
Ornate bay ceiling in Kaitabheshvara temple at Kubatur

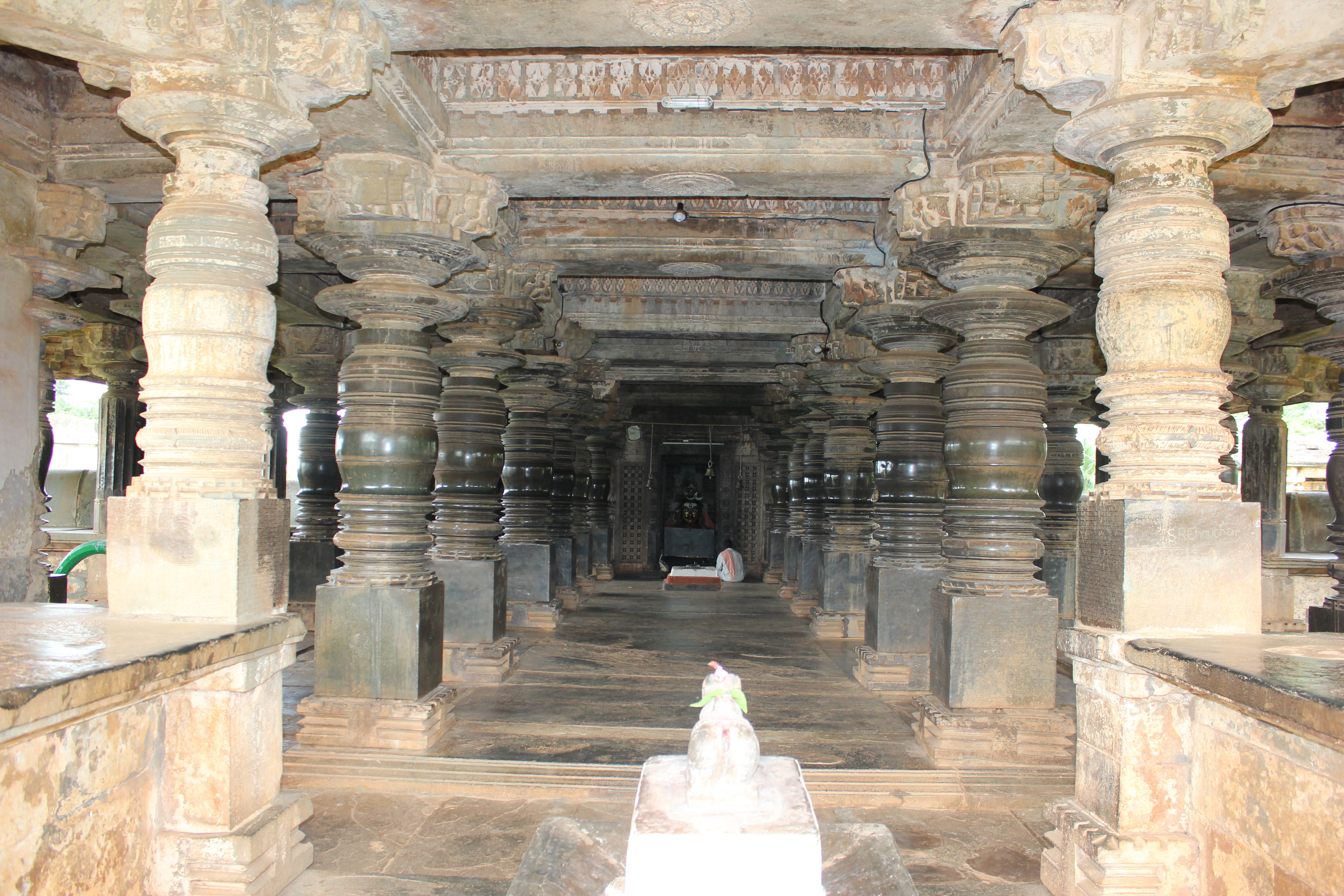
large open mahamantapa (main hall) with three sided entrance in Kaitabheshvara temple at Kubatur

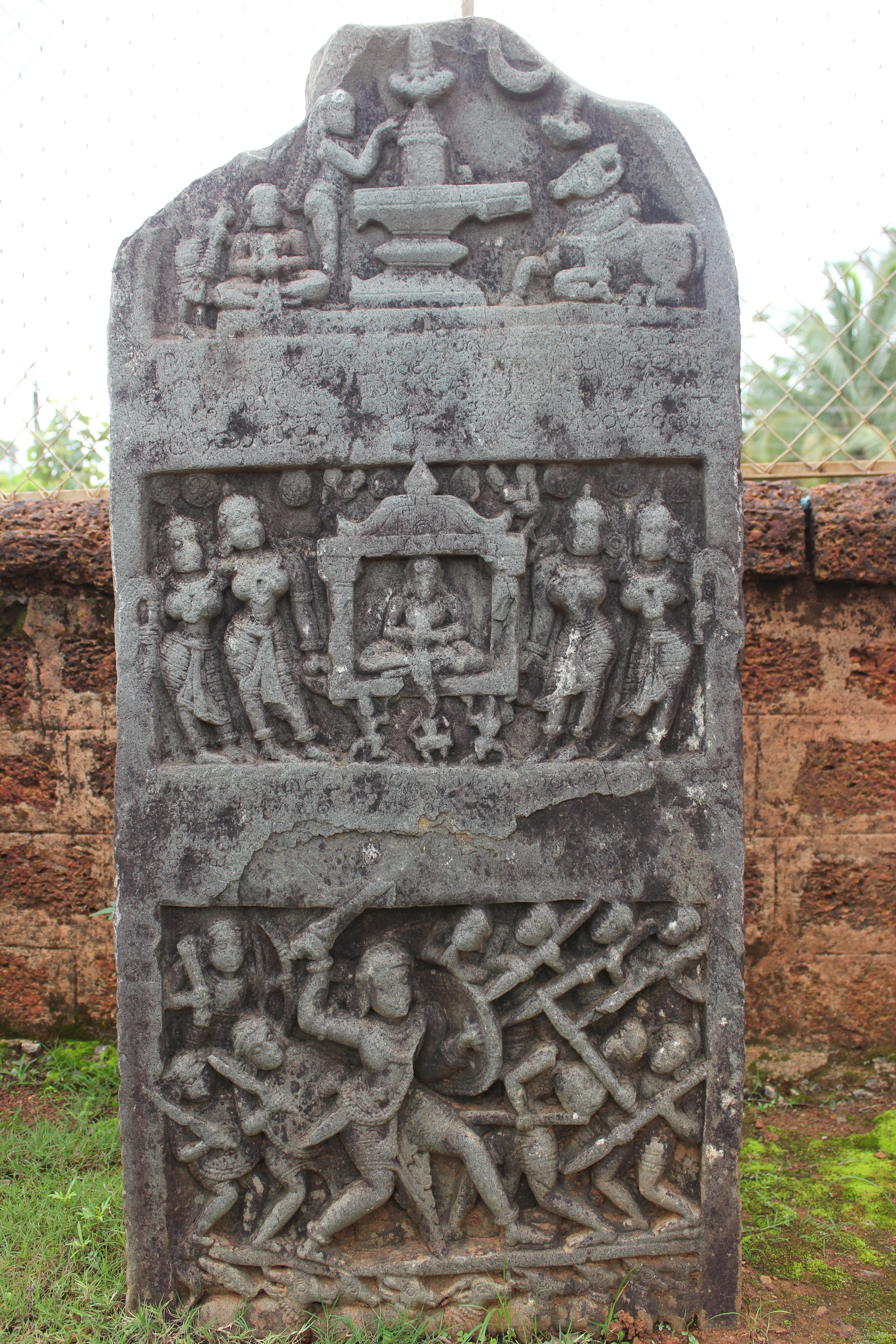
A virgal (Hero stone) in Kaitabheshvara temple at Kubatur

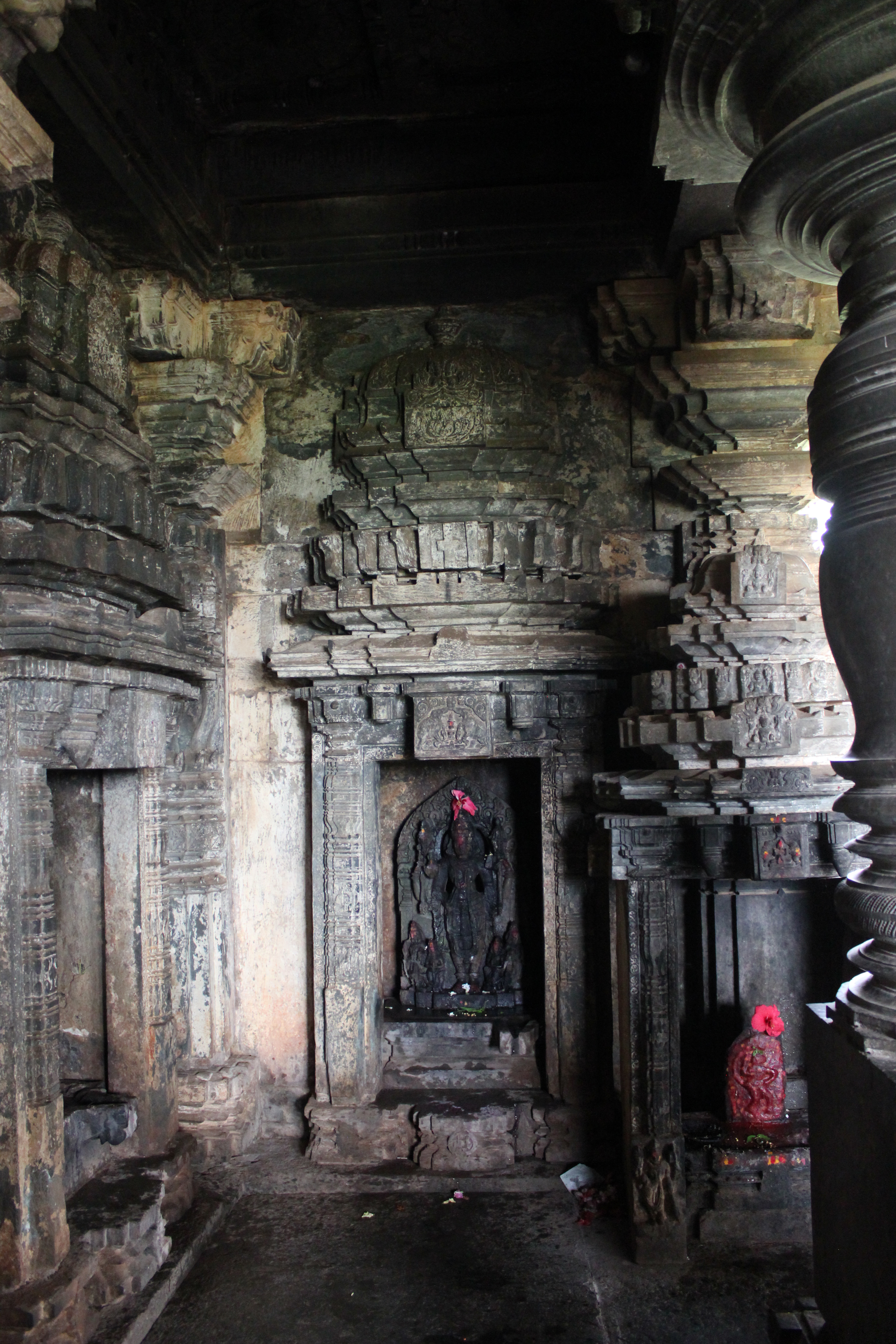
A small shrine in the hall of Kaitabheshvara temple at Kubatur

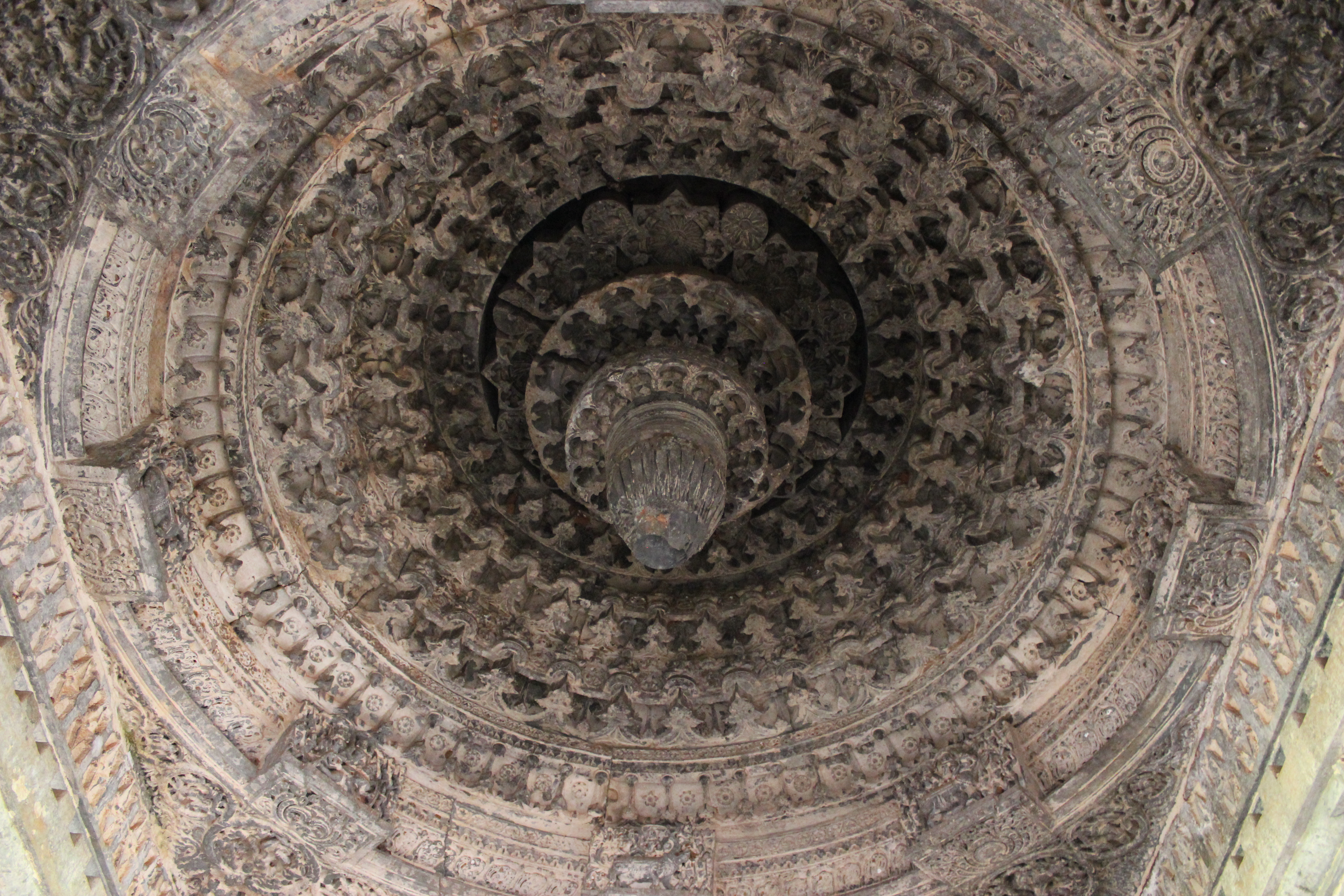
Ornate domical bay ceiling in Kaitabheshvara temple at Kubatur
