= Vikramaditya VI =

Western Chalukya emperor from 1076 to 1126

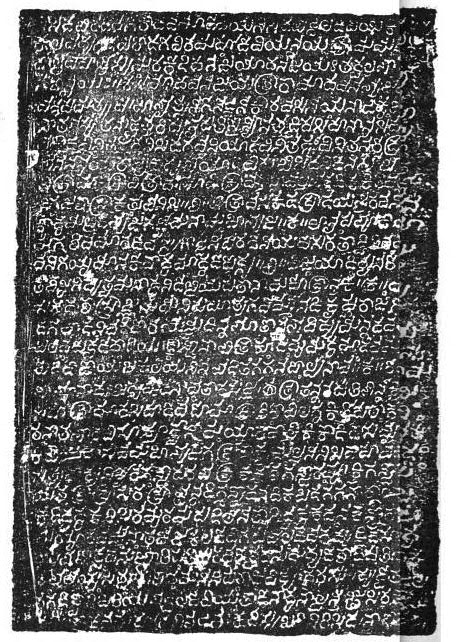
- Old Kannada inscription (1077 AD) of Vikramaditya VI in Panchabasti Temple at Humcha

Western Chalukya emperor
- Reign: 11 February 1076 – 1126
- Anointment: 11 February 1076
- Predecessor: Someshvara II
- Successor: Someshvara III
- Died: 1126
- Spouse: Chandala Devi; Kethala Devi; Savala Devi
- Issue: Someshvara III
- House: Chalukya dynasty
- Father: Someshvara I

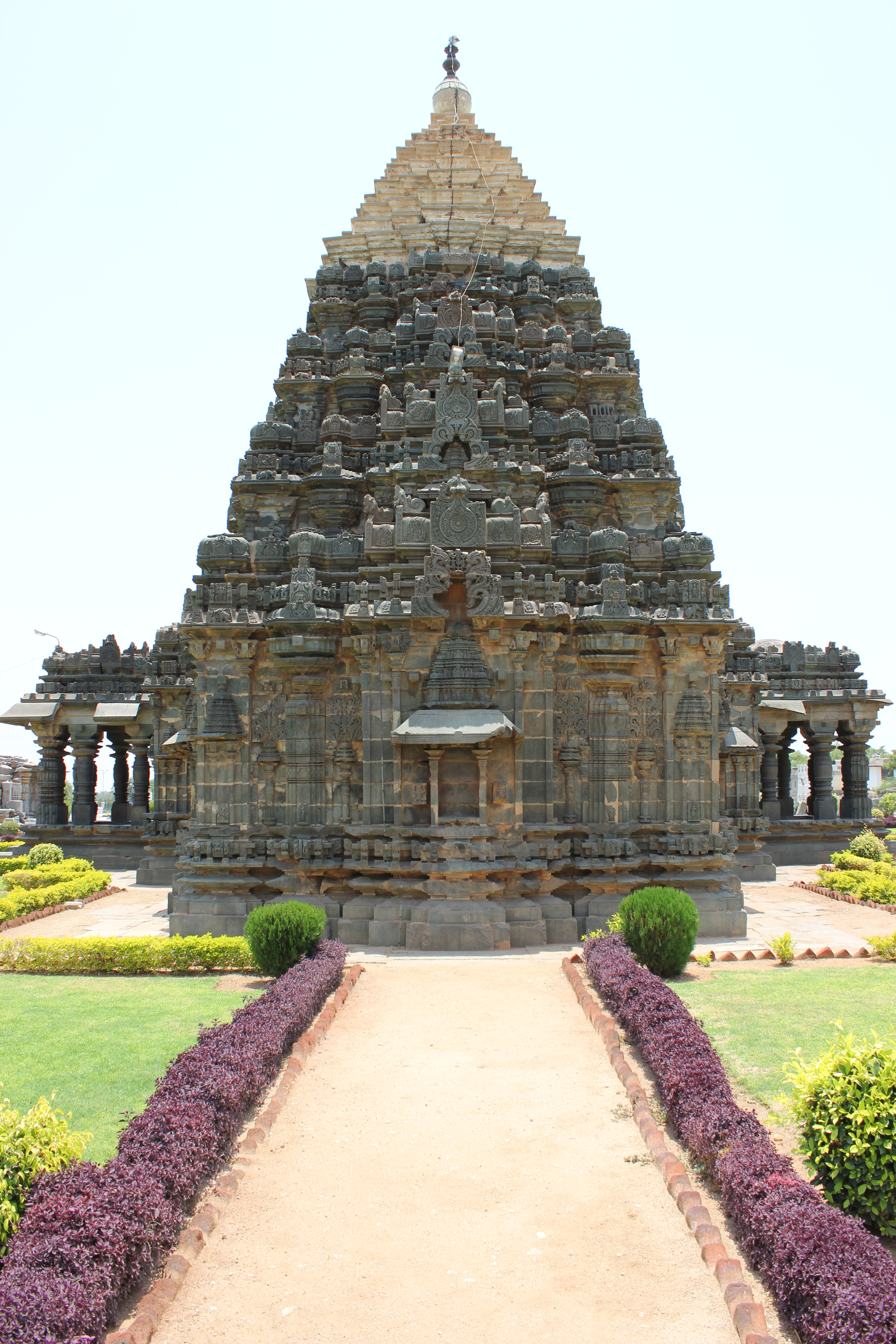
Mahadeva Temple at Itagi (c.1112)

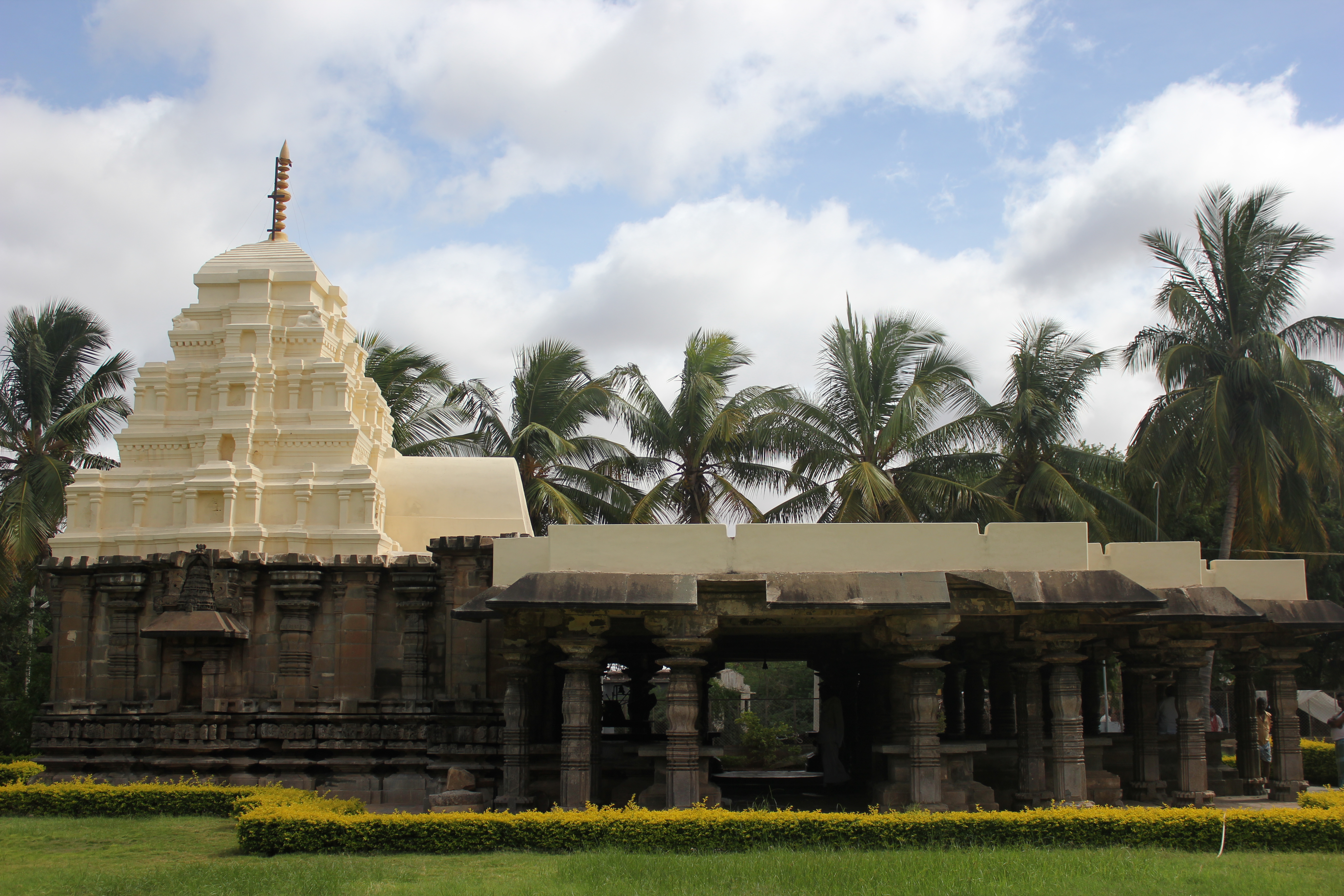
Kalleshvara Temple (c.1083) at Ambali

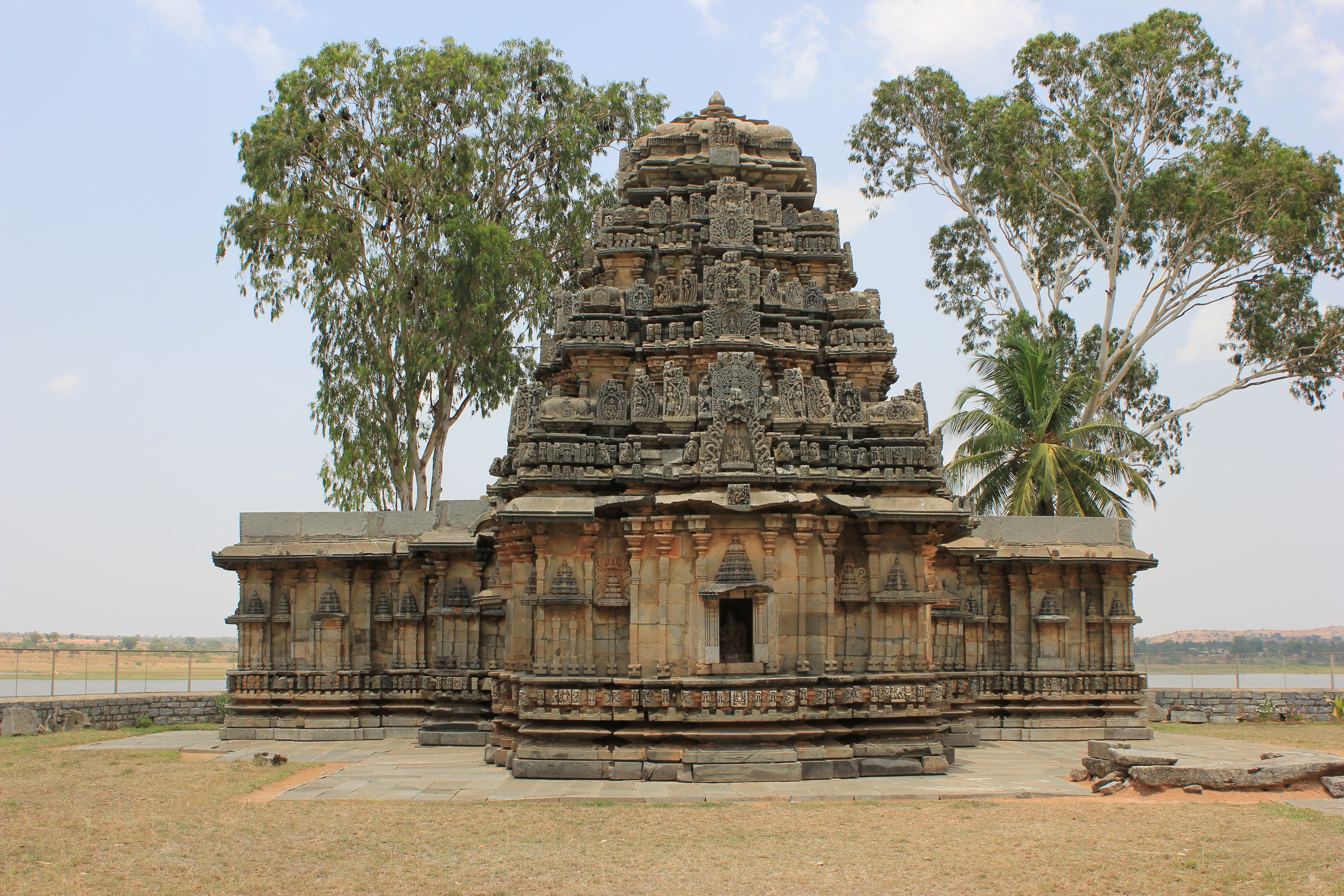
Bhimeshvara Temple at Nilagunda (c.1075-1100)

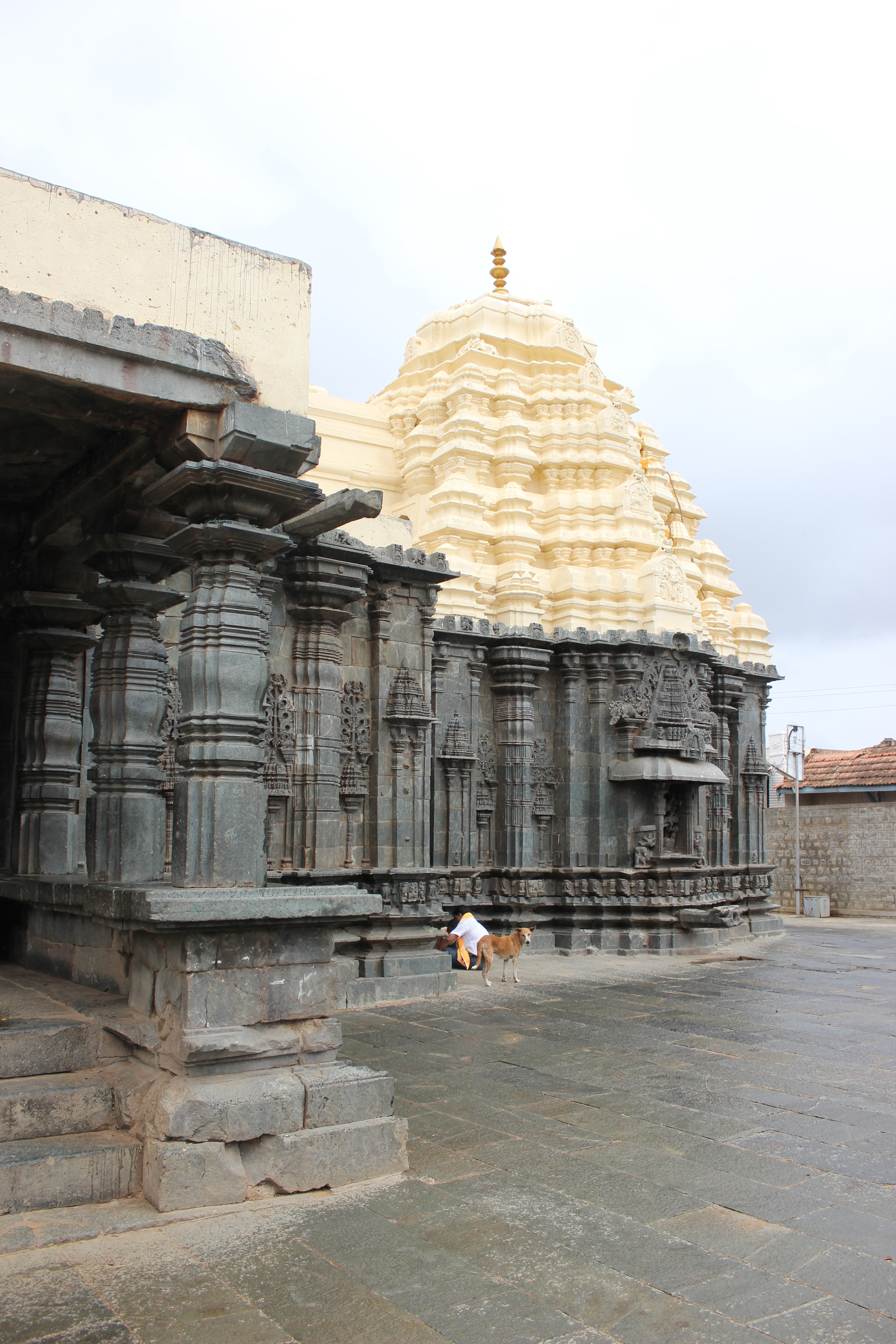
Mallikarjuna Temple at Kuruvatti Temple (c.1070-1100)

Vikramaditya VI (died 1126) was the Western Chalukya emperor from 1076 until his death in 1126. He became the king after deposing his elder brother Someshvara II, a political move he made by gaining the support of Chalukya vassals during the Chola invasion of Chalukya territory. Vikramaditya's reign is marked with the abolishment of the Saka era and the start of the Chalukya-Vikrama era. He was the greatest of the Western Chalukya kings and had the longest reign in the dynasty. He earned the title Permadideva and Tribhuvanamalla (lit "lord of three worlds"). He had several queens who ably assisted him in administration. One of his queens, Chandala Devi, a princess from the Shilahara ruling family of Karad was called Abhinava Saraswati for her skills as an artist. Queen Kethala Devi administered the Siruguppa region and Savala Devi was in charge of an Agrahara in Naregal. According to the historian Kamath, Vikramaditya VI was a "great king who ruled over South India" and he finds a "pride of place in Karnataka history". More inscriptions in Kannada are attributed to Vikramaditya VI than any other king prior to the Vijayanagara era.

Vikramaditya VI is noted for his patronage of art and letters. His court was adorned with famous Kannada and Sanskrit poets. In Kannada, his brother prince Kirtivarma wrote Govaidya on veterinary science and the poet Brahmashiva wrote Samayaparikshe ("Analysis of the doctrine", c. 1125) and received the title Kavi Chakravarti (lit, "Emperor among poets") Noted Sanskrit scholars such as Bilhana who earned the title Vidyapati ("pundit") came to his court from faraway Kashmir and wrote a panegyric on the life of his patron king in Vikramankadevacharita. The poet compared his rule to Ramarajya ("Rama's Kingdom"). Vijnaneshwara the noted jurist in his court wrote Mitakshara, a commentary on Yagnavalkya Smriti (on Hindu family law). Of the king he wrote "A King like Vikramarka is neither to be seen nor heard of". Vikramaditya VI is known to be a Shaiva by faith. His rule saw prolific temple building activity. Notable constructions include the Mallikarjuna temple, the Mahadeva Temple the Kaitabheshvara Temple and the Kalleshvara Temple. According to historian Sen, the 50-year reign of Vikramaditya VI was overall a peaceful and prosperous one. Sen estimates at his peak Vikramaditya VI controlled a vast empire stretching from the Tumkur district and Cuddapah in the south to the Narmada River in the north, and up to the Khammam district and the Godavari district in the east and south-east.

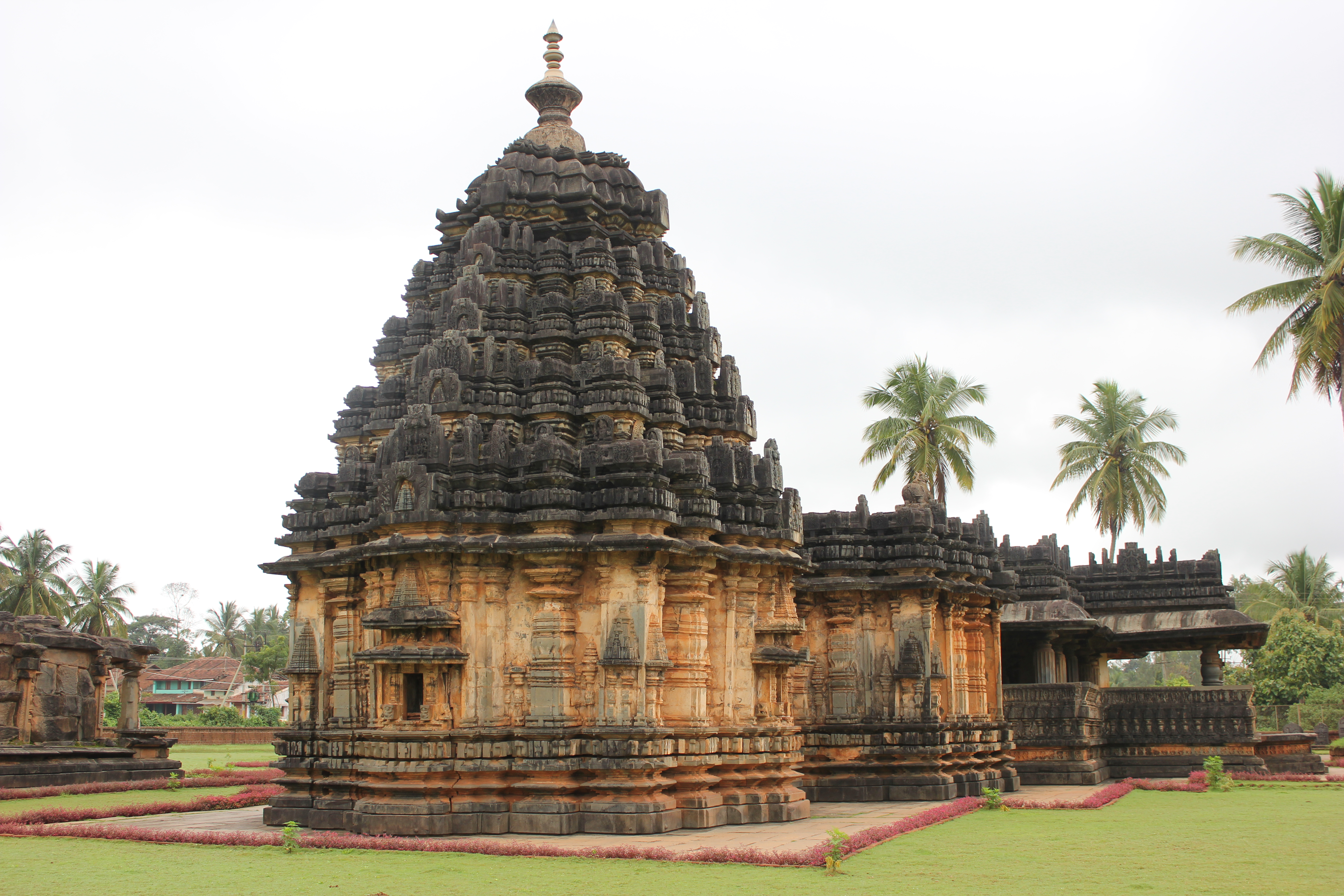
Kaitabheshvara Temple (c.1100) at Kubatur

== Vikramaditya's rebellion, rise to power and Chola relations ==
Vikramaditya displayed his military ambitions even as a prince, prior to 1068, during the rule of his father Someshvara I when he led successful military campaigns as far east as modern Bihar and Bengal. After his father's death, as soon as his elder brother prince Someshvara II who administered the Belavola-300 and Puligere-300 provinces came to the throne, Vikramaditya VI started to plan to overthrow him and contend with the growing Chola power. He achieved his ends with skillful opportunism and diplomacy: by making use of the Chola invasion of Gutti and Kampili and striking diplomatic relations with Virarajendra Chola, gaining the support his younger brother Jayasimha and of the Chalukya feudatories, the Pandyas of Ucchangi, the Seuna, the Hoysalas of Malnad, the Kadambas of Konkan and Hangal. Someshvara II had the support of the Kulothunga Chola I (also called Rajendra II of the Eastern Chalukya-Chola royal family of Vengi) and the Kadambas of Goa. This sudden change in diplomatic relations practically bifurcated the Chalukya kingdom into two halves, giving Vikramaditya VI independent rule over the southern half (Gangavadi). Vikramaditya married one of Virarajendra Chola's daughters bringing an age-old feud between the two kingdoms to a temporary end.

The balance of power changed again in 1069 with the death of Virarajendra Chola. Vikramaditya VI proceeded via Kanchi where he quelled a rebellion and installed his younger brother-in-law Athirajendra Chola on the throne at Gangaikonda Cholapuram. But this went against the designs of Kulottunga Chola I who had plans of his own. Kulothunga expelled the Vengi ruler Vijayaditya. In a civil uprising in the Chola capital, Athirajendra was killed making way for Kulothunga Chola I to crown himself the monarch of the Chola Empire. In 1070-72, when Vijayabahu revolted to rid Ceylon of the Chola rule and succeeded, Vikramaditya VI wasted no time in declaring the new king of Ceylon his "natural ally". By 1076, despite being surrounded by enemies at home (Someshvara II) and in Vengi and Chola country (Kulothunga Chola I), Vikramaditya VI successfully defeated his elder brother and took him captive. He then crowned himself the Chalukya monarch and began a new era, the Vikrama Varsha.

== Hoysala threat ==
There was a rebellion by the emperor's younger brother Jayasimha, the viceroy of Banavasi, around c.1080-1082 which was quelled and the rebel pardoned. The real threat, however, was from the Hoysala dynasty who rose to prominence from the Malnad region in modern Karnataka. Their territory effectively acted as a buffer between the Chalukya and Chola kingdoms. For several decades, the Hoysalas had been faithful vassals of the Chalukyas. King Someshvara I (Vikramaditya's father) had taken a Hoysala princess as his queen. The Hoysala kings Vinayaditya, Ereyanga and Veera Ballala I had maintained cordial relations with Vikramaditya VI. But Ballala I's younger brother Vishnuvardhana, who according to historians Sastri and Kamath was a "great warrior" and an ambitious ruler had expansionist plans. He had the support of the Pandya ruler of Ucchangi and Kadamba king Jayakesi II of Goa. The Hoysalas under Vishnuvardhana began to expand their territory initially by defeating the Cholas in the famous battle of Talakad in 1116 resulting in the Hoysala annexation of Gangavadi (part of modern Southern Karnataka). It was only when Vishnuvardhana turned his attention to the north, conquered Nolambavadi, marched beyond the Tungabhadra River and reached Ballary and Kummata that Vikramaditya VI saw an imminent threat to his power. The Chalukya emperor dispatched his trusted generals Achugi II and Permadi of the Sinda family of Yerambarge (or Yelburga) to deal with the situation. After several pitched battles in Goa, Kannegala, Halasur and Hosavidu between c.1117-1122, Vishnuvardhana and his supporters had to accept Chalukya suzerainty.

== Success in Chola and Gurjara country ==
From the beginning of his rule, Vikramaditya VI maintained the policy of interference in the affairs of Vengi and Kanchi. He invaded and captured Kanchi in 1085 and held it for a few years. He managed to conquer parts of Vengi in 1088. He held the Kollipakei-7000 province of Vengi for many years. Vengi came under his rule again from 1093 to 1099. The Cholas re-captured it in 1099. In 1115 Kulothunga Chola I recalled his son Vikrama Chola who was the viceroy of Vengi to focus on affairs in Kanchi. Encouraged by the Hoysala success against the Cholas at Talakad and utilising the vacuum in the leadership in Vengi, Vikramaditya VI sent his famous general Anantapala to invade Vengi which was duly conquered and came under his rule from 1118 to 1124. Western Chalukyan commanders are seen controlling some other parts of Telugu country also and the Chola influence over Vengi disappeared for many years. After Vikramaditya's death in 1126, the Cholas began a slow process of encroachment over Vengi. By 1133 Vikrama Chola was able to re-capture Vengi from Vikramaditya VI's mild son Someshvara III. Before 1088, Vikramaditya VI subdued the recalcitrant Shilahara King Bhoja I and the Seuna Yadavas of Devagiri. He invaded Lata (modern Gujarat), plundered and burnt the royal capital of the Gurjara Chalukya King Karna, and stopped the advances of Kalachuri king Jajjaladeva of Ratnapur. He dealt firmly with the revolting Kadamba feudatory of Goa but gave his daughter Maila Devi in marriage to King Jayakeshi II.

== Gallery ==
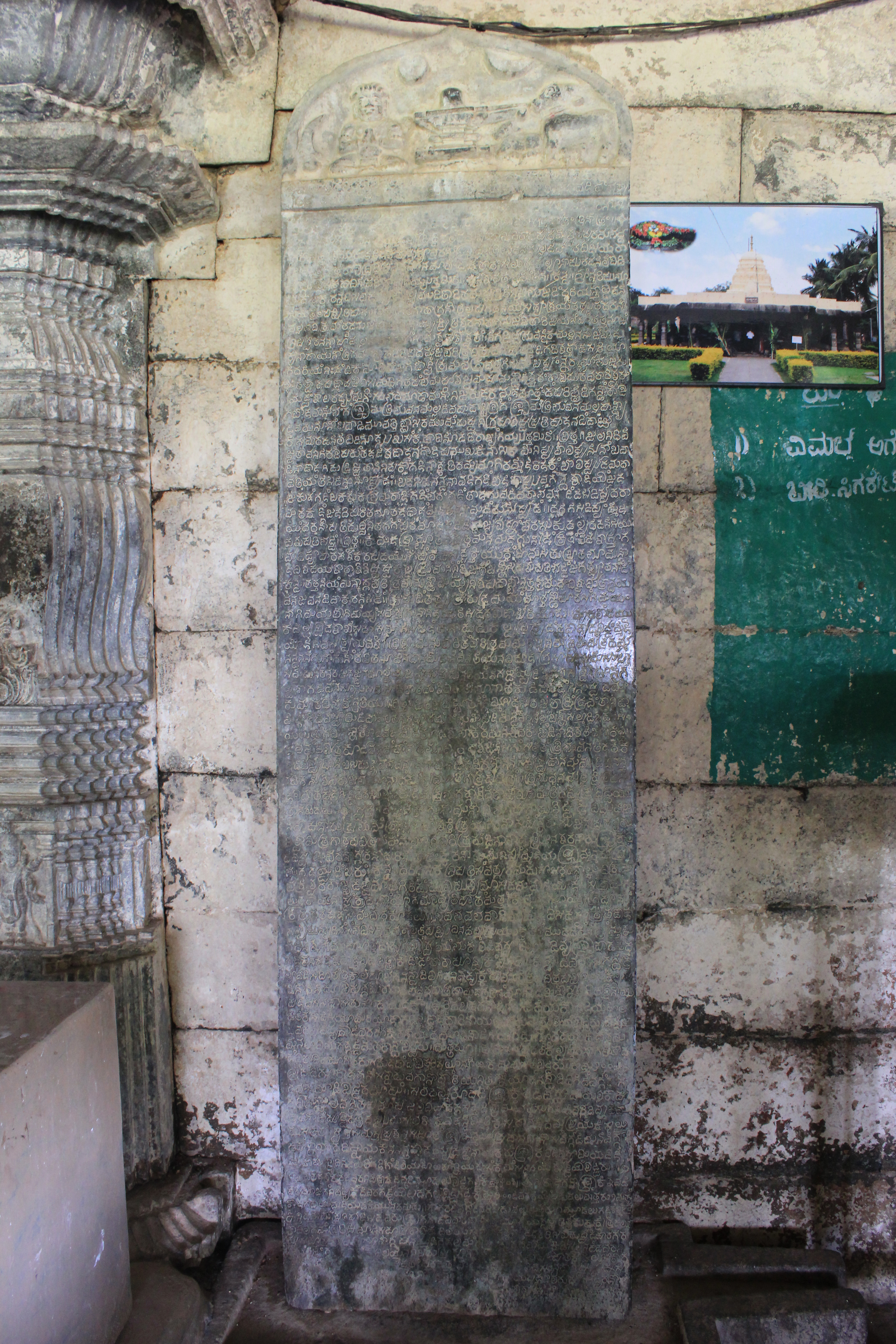
Old Kannada inscription (c.1083) of King Vikramaditya VI, at the Kalleshvara Temple, Ambali

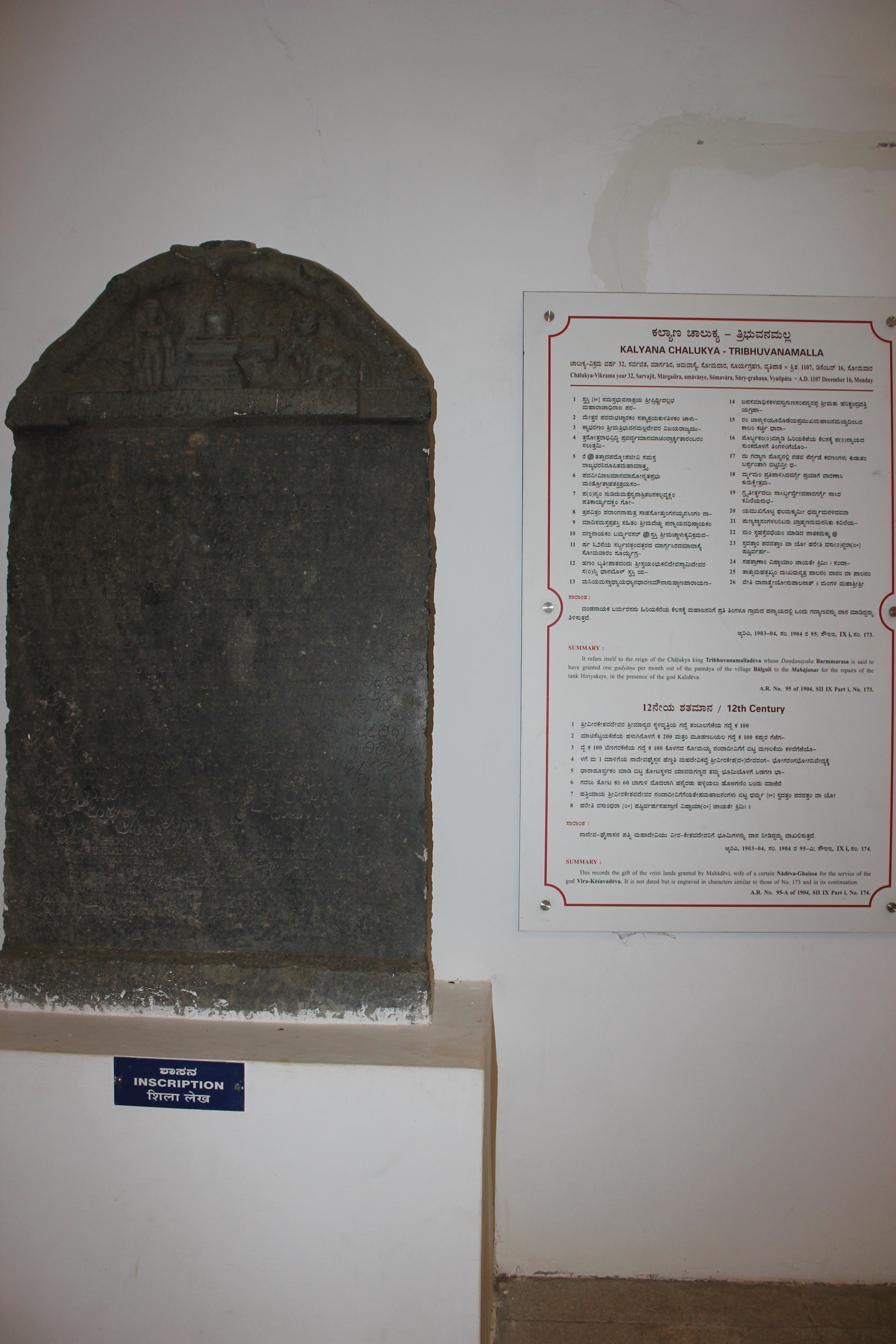
Old Kannada inscription (c.1107 AD) of Western Chalukya King Vikramaditya VI

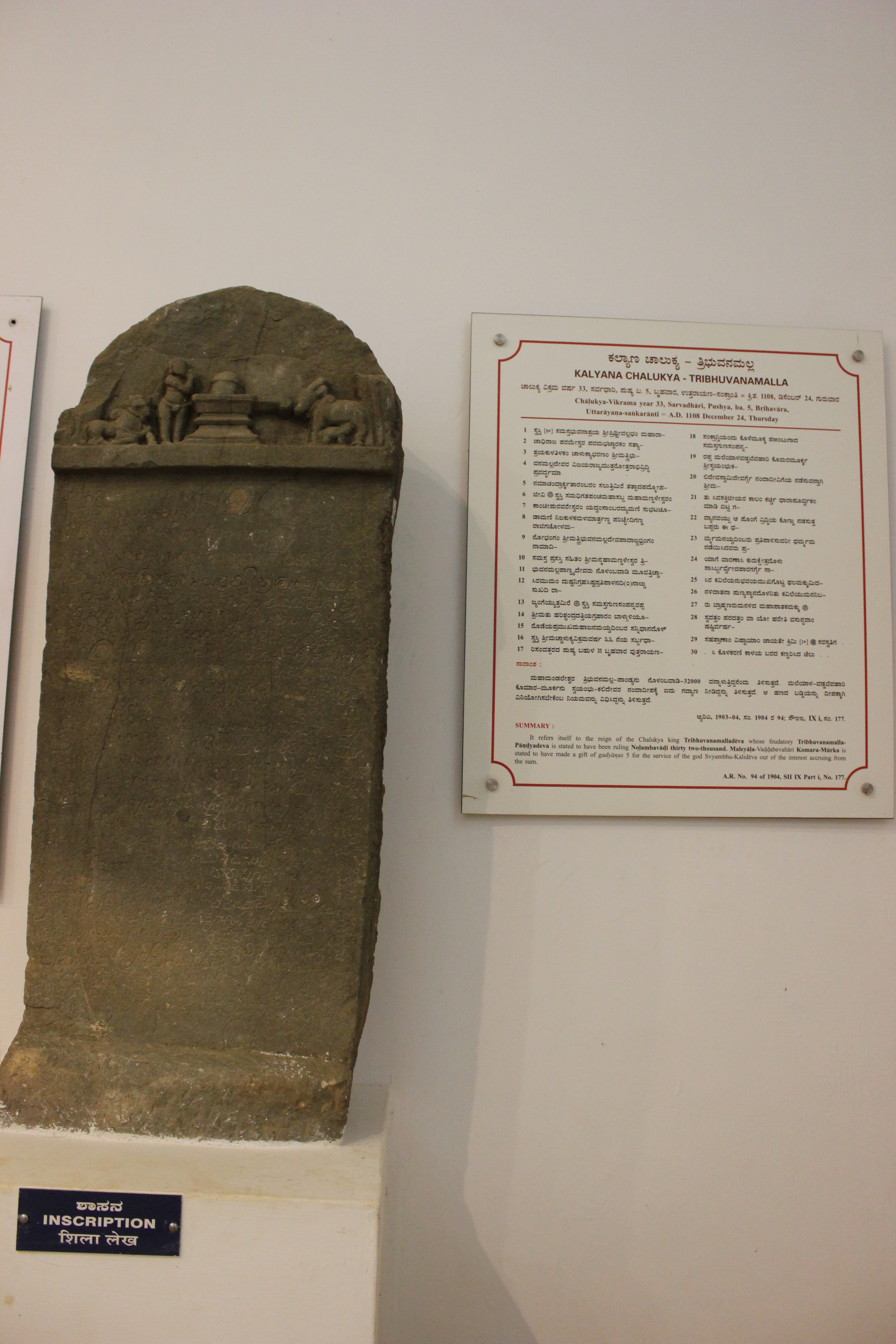
Old Kannada inscription (c.1108 AD) of Western Chalukya King Vikramaditya VI

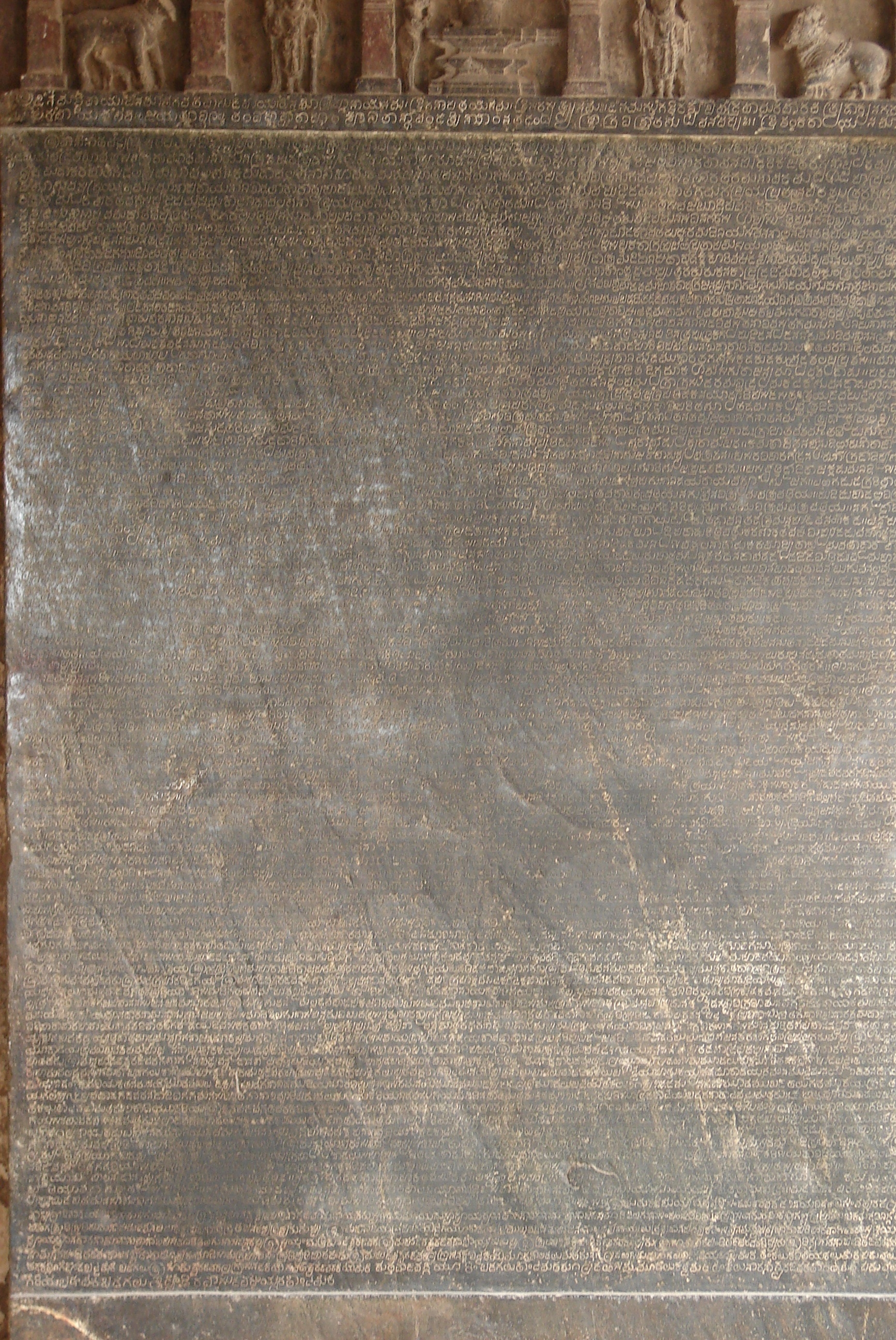
Old Kannada inscription (1112 CE) of King Vikramaditya VI in the Mahadeva Temple at Itagi

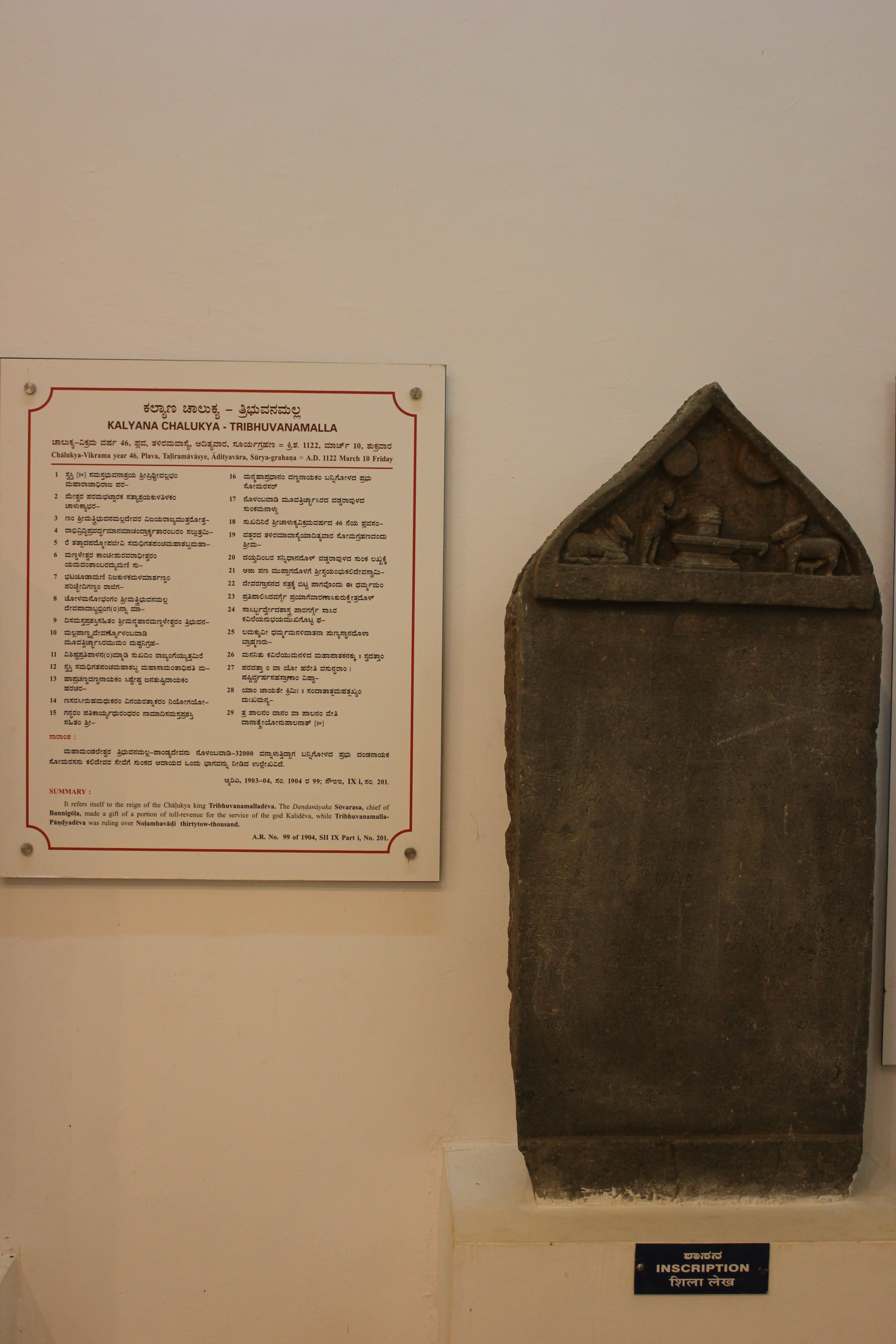
Old Kannada inscription (c.1122 AD) of Western Chalukya King Vikramaditya VI

== See also ==
- Vikrama Chola
- Vishnuvardhana Hoysala
- The title Vikramaditya
