= Kalleshvara Temple, Ambali =

Kalleshvara Temple
- Hindu temple
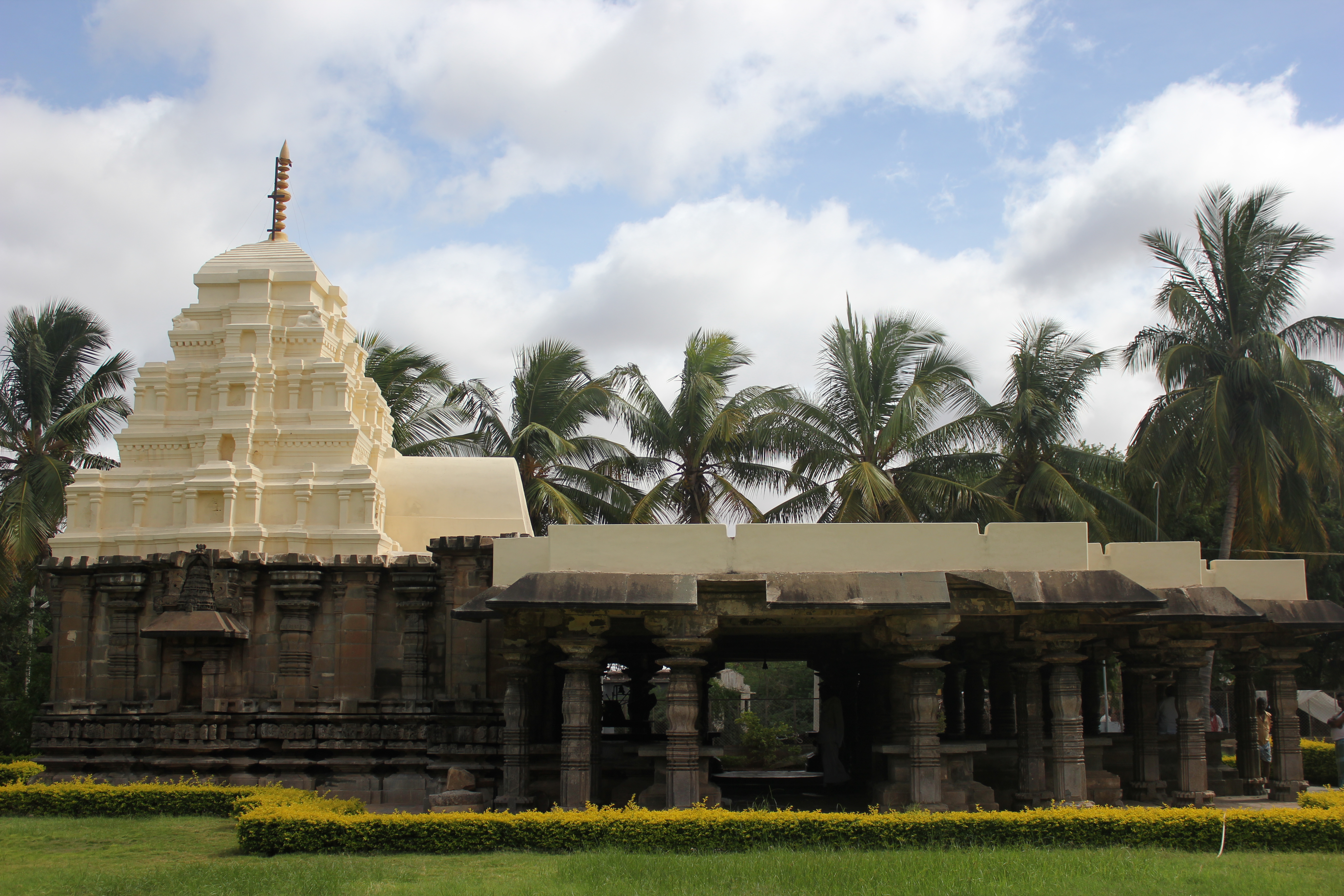
- Kalleshwara temple (1083) at Bagali in Bellary district
- Country: India
- State: Karnataka
- District: Vijayanagara District

Languages
  - Official: Kannada
- Time zone: UTC+5:30 (IST)
- ISO 3166 code: IN-KA
- Vehicle registration: KA
- Website: karnataka.gov.in

The Kalleshvara temple (also spelt Kalleshwara or Kallesvara) is located in the town of Ambali in Vijayanagara district of Karnataka state, India. According to an Old Kannada inscription (dated 1083) placed in the sabhamantapa (lit, "gathering hall"), the temple was constructed during the reign of the Western Chalukya Empire King Vikramaditya VI (also called Tribhuvana Malla). This temple is protected as a monument of national importance by the Archaeological Survey of India.

== Temple plan ==
Art historian Adam Hardy categorizes the architectural style of the temple as "12th century, trans-Tungabhadra branch of the Lakkundi school, related to Kuruvatti (Mallikarjuna temple) with some non-mainstream affinities". The temple is a single shrine (vimana) construction with an adjoining hall (mantapa). The basic building material is Soap stone. The original superstructure over the shrine is lost. The temple which faces east comprises a sanctum (garbhagriha), an antechamber (or vestibule or antarala whose tower is called the sukhanasi) that connects the sanctum to a gathering hall (sabhamantapa) which is preceded by a main hall (mukhamantapa). The walls of the shrine and the sabhamantapa are articulated with projections and recesses creating niches which carry miniature decorative tower or turrets (Aedicula) in vesara style (a fusion of south and north Indian styles). The doorjamb of the sanctum and antechamber are crafted with decorative motifs, and the lintel (lalata) depicts Gajalakshmi (the Hindu goddess Lakshmi flanked by elephants on either side). The square bases of pillars in the sabhamantapa and mukhamantapa have the characteristic decoration with reliefs, depicting various Hindu deities such as Surya (the sun god), Bhairava (a version of the god Shiva) and Durga.

== See also ==
- Kalleshwara Temple, Hire Hadagali
- Kalleshvara Temple, Bagali

== Gallery ==
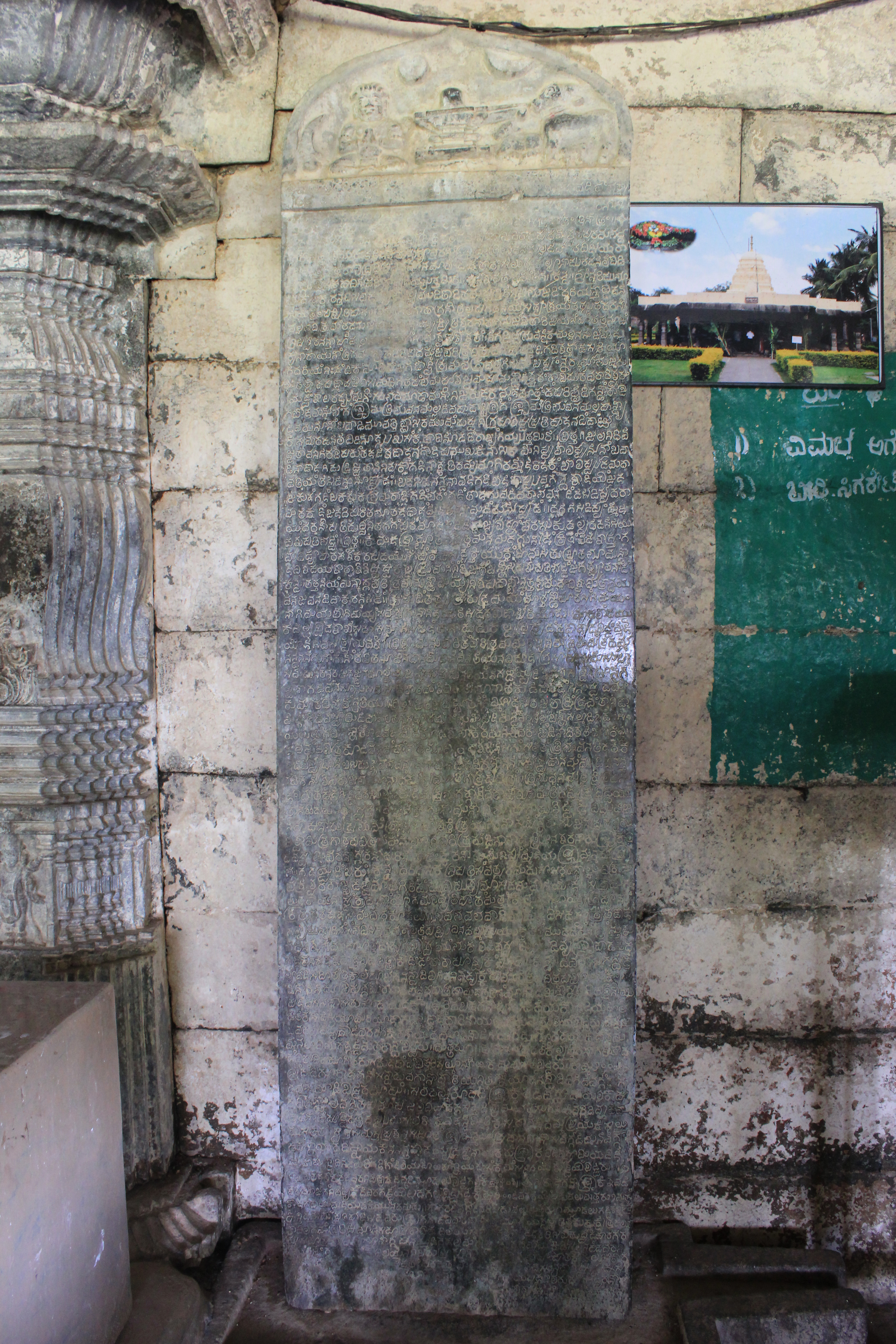
Old Kannada inscription of King Vikramaditya VI dated 1083 in open hall of Kalleshvara temple at Ambali

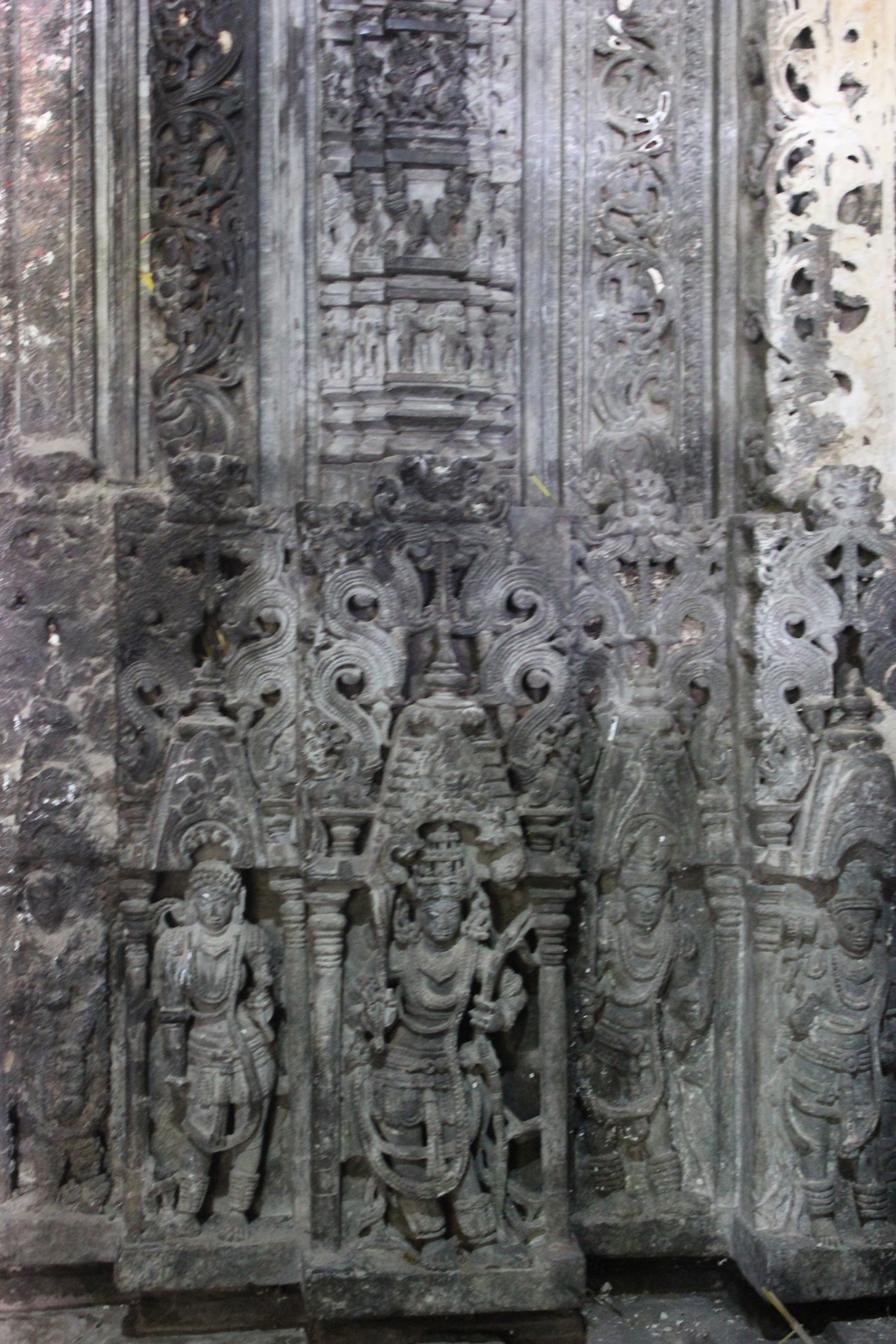
Doorjamb relief in Kalleshvara temple at Ambali

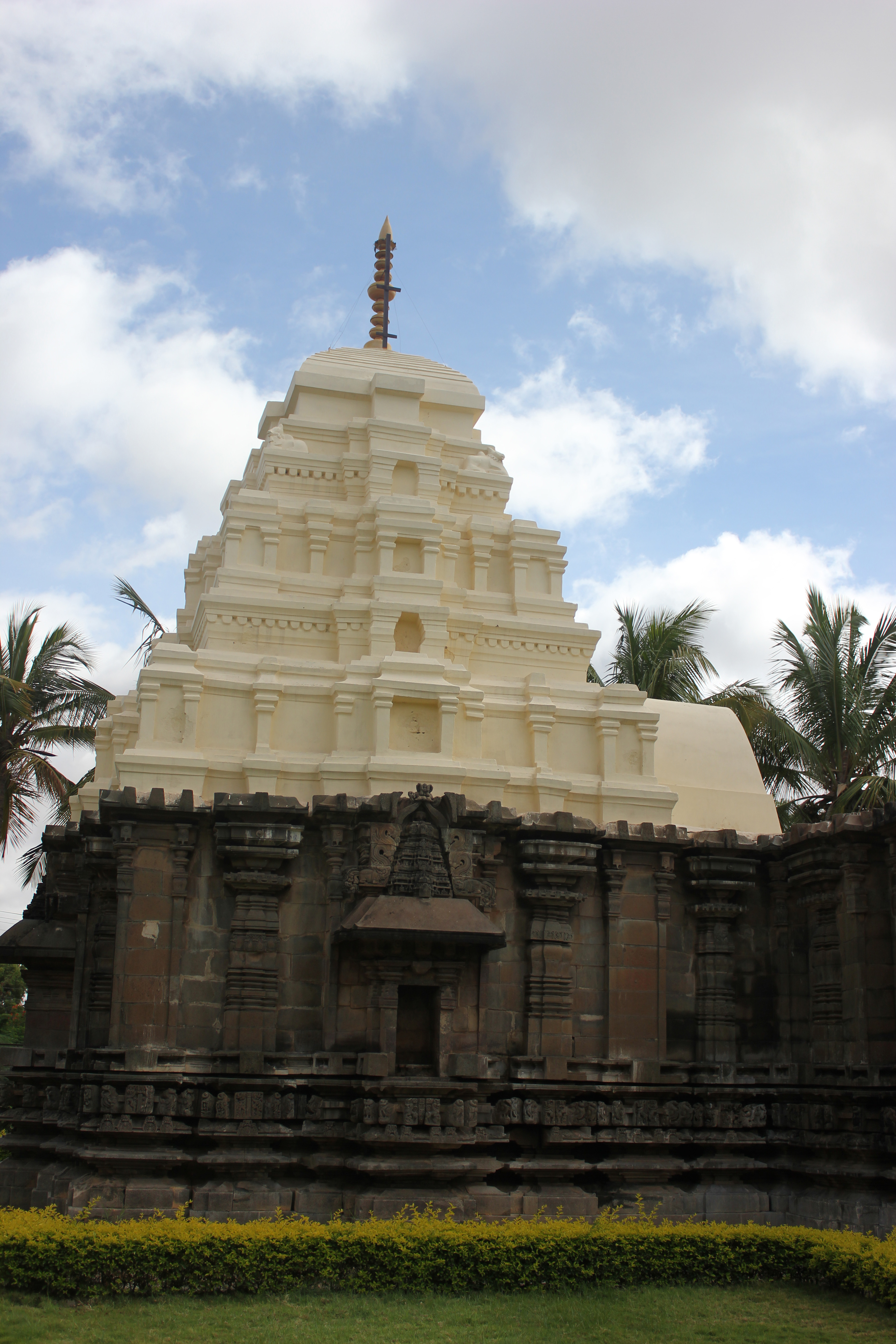
Vesara vimana (shrine and tower or shikhara) at Kalleshvara temple, Ambali

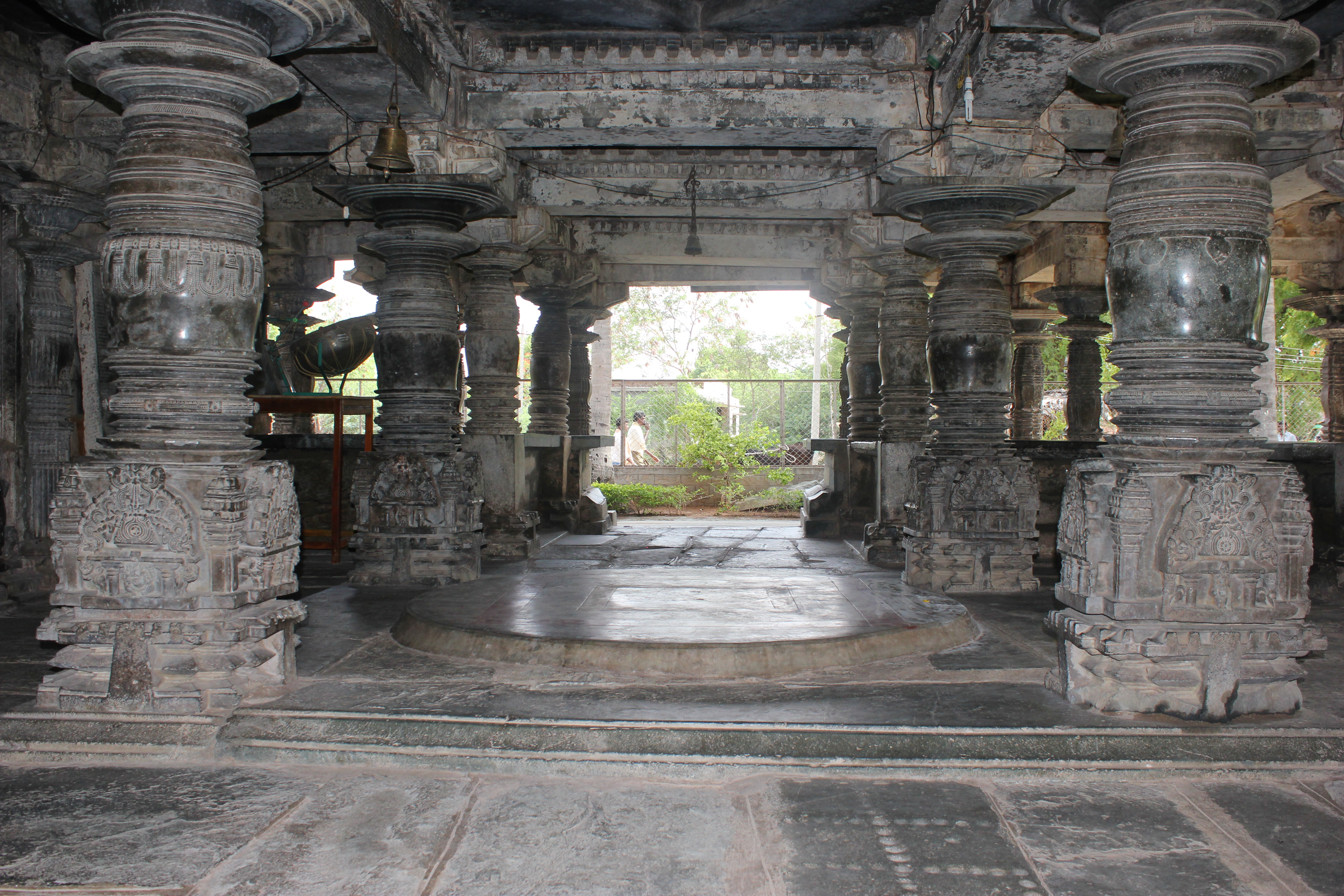
Ornate mantapa (hall) and lathe turned pillars with decorative base containing relief
