= Kalleshwara Temple, Hire Hadagali =

Kalleshwara Temple
- Village
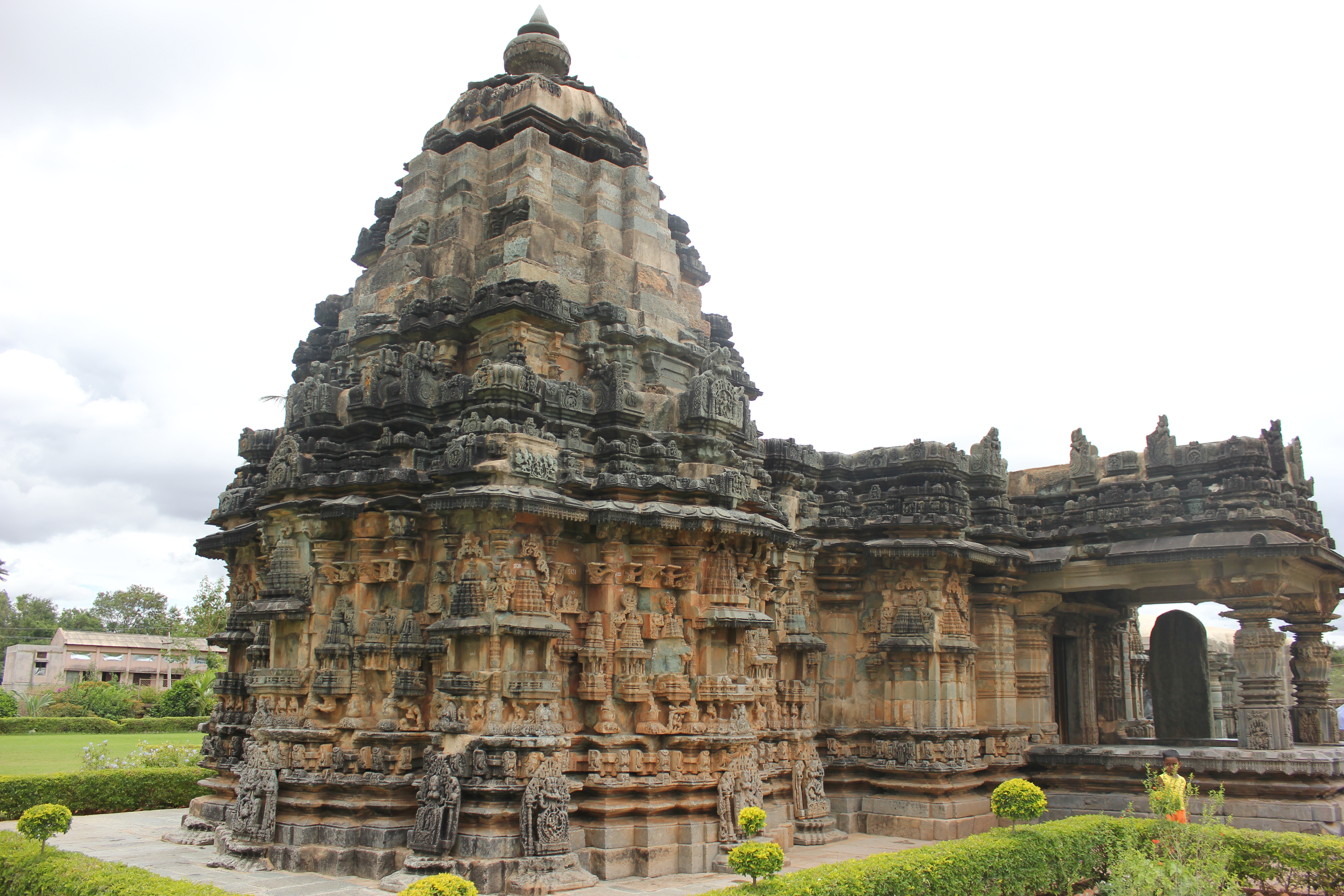
- Kalleshwara temple (1057 A.D.) at Hire Hadagali in Vijayanagara district

- Location within Karnataka Location within India
- Coordinates: 14°55′31″N 75°49′52″E
- Country: India
- State: Karnataka
- District: Vijayanagara district
- Taluk: Hoovina Hadagali

Languages
  - Official: Kannada
- Time zone: UTC+5:30 (IST)

The Kalleshwara temple (also spelt Kalleshvara or Kallesvara) is located in the town of Hire Hadagali of the Hoovina Hadagalitaluk in Vijayanagara district (then Bellary district) of Karnataka state, India.

== Kalleshwara Temple ==
The temple was constructed by Demarasa, prime minister (or mahamatya) to Western Chalukya Empire King Someshvara I (who had the honorific Trailokya Malladeva or "Lord of three worlds"), who reigned from 1042–1068 CE. Art historian Adam Hardy refers to the temple as Kattesvara and classifies it as a "close to mainstream" Western Chalukya architecture (also called Later or Kalyani Chalukya), with the tower over the shrine being a later day re-construction. The basic material used for the original construction is soapstone.

According to art historian Ajay Sinha, an old Kannada inscription (c. 1057) at the temple calls it Bhimesvara-Demesvara. The inscription gives information about the genealogy of the Chalukya dynasty and refers to Vikramaditya VI as a kumara (prince). Another old Kannada inscription (c. 1108) from the rule of Vikramaditya VI gives further details about the consecration of the temple by Udayaditya under the orders of Demarasa. A third poetic Kannada inscription (c. 1212) on the premises belongs to the rule of Hoysala King Veera Ballala II. The temple is protected as a monument of national importance by the Archaeological Survey of India.

== Temple plan ==
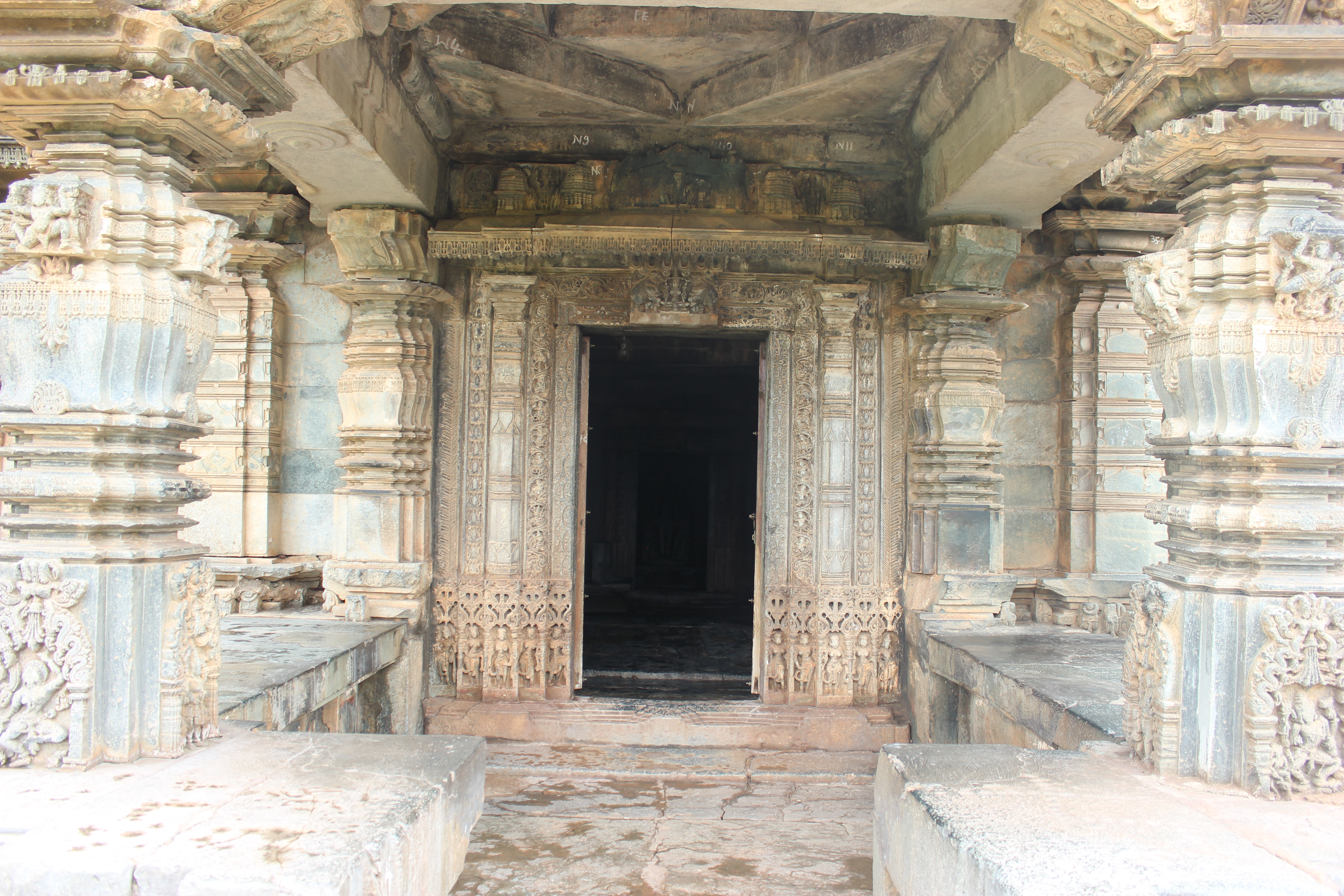
Ornate porch entrance into Kalleshvara temple at Hire Hadagali

The temple is two shrined (dvikuta, though only one shrine has a superstructure or shikhara), each with a sanctum (garbhagriha) and a vestibule (antarala) that connects to a common four pillared closed hall (navaranga or sabhamantapa, lit meaning "gathering hall"). In the original plan, a large "main hall" (mukhamantapa) existed, connecting the closed hall to the outside of the temple, form the southern direction. Outside the main temple complex, an open hall (called nandimantapa) containing a sculpture of Nandi (the bull, a companion of the god Shiva) has been converted into a shrine.

The decorativeness of the outer walls of the main shrine and its closed hall exemplify Chalukyan art. Projections and recesses with niches have been created and used skillfully to accommodate pilasters whose niches contains Hindu deities in relief, depicting the gods Indra, Shiva, his consort Parvati, Lakshmi and others. The doorway to the vestibule has artistic carvings of dvarapalas (door keepers), the goddess of love Rati, and god of love Manmatha. The door lintel (lalata) has an image of Gajalakshmi (Lakshmi flanked by elephants on either side). The eaves over the door has fine images of the Hindu deities Brahma, Keshava (a form of Vishnu) and Shiva. According to Sinha, the exuberance of sculptural articulation seen here is actually a southern Karnataka Hoysala influence on Chalukyan architecture.

== See also ==
- Kalleshvara Temple, Ambali
- Kalleshvara Temple, Bagali

== Gallery ==
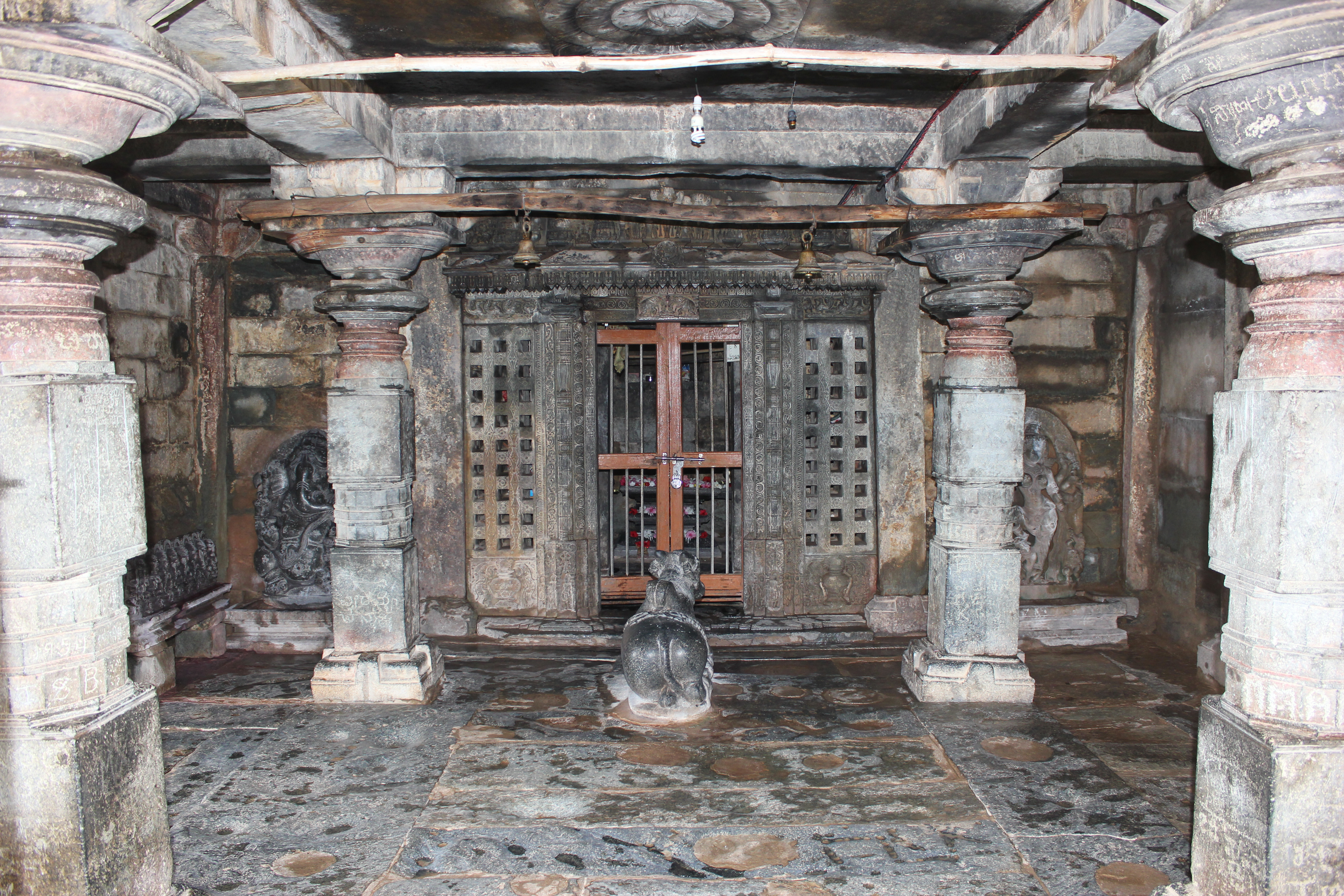
Navaranga (closed mantapa or hall) facing a shrine in Kalleshwara temple, Hire Hadagali

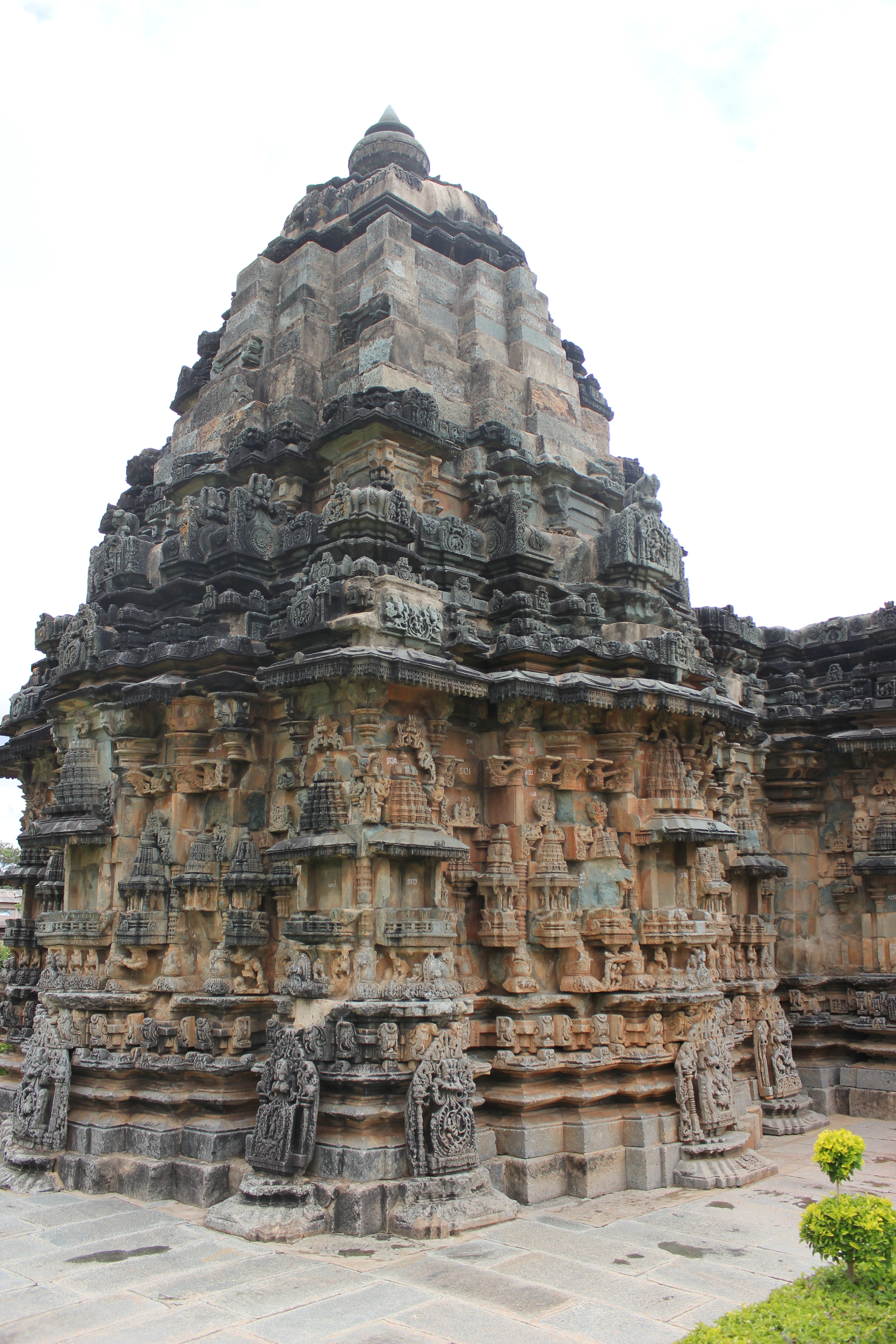
Vesara tower in Kalleshwara temple at Hire Hadagali

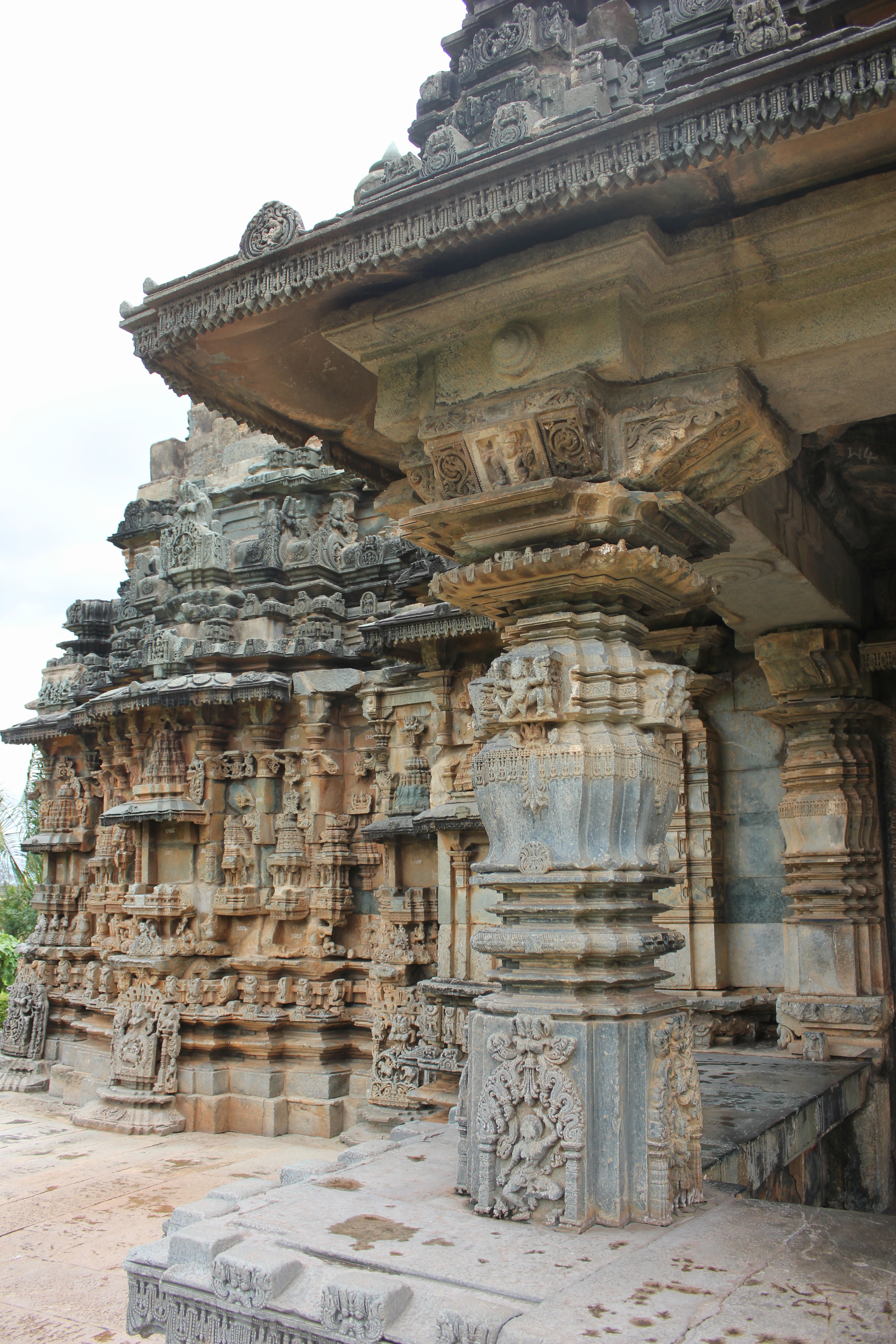
Profile of shrine, and porch with decorative half pillar in Kalleshwara temple, Hire Hadagali

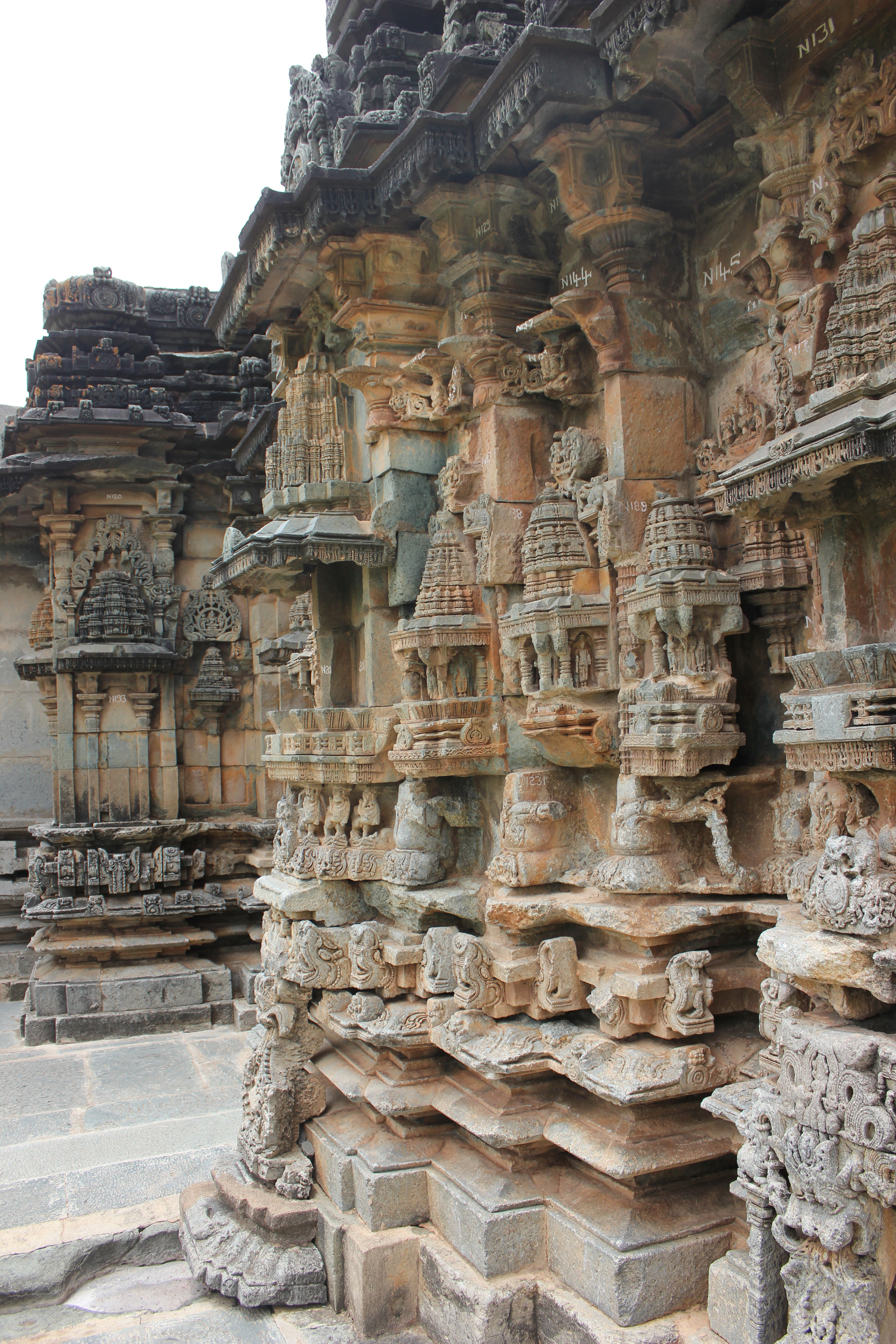
Shrine wall relief carvings in Kalleshwara temple, Hire Hadagali

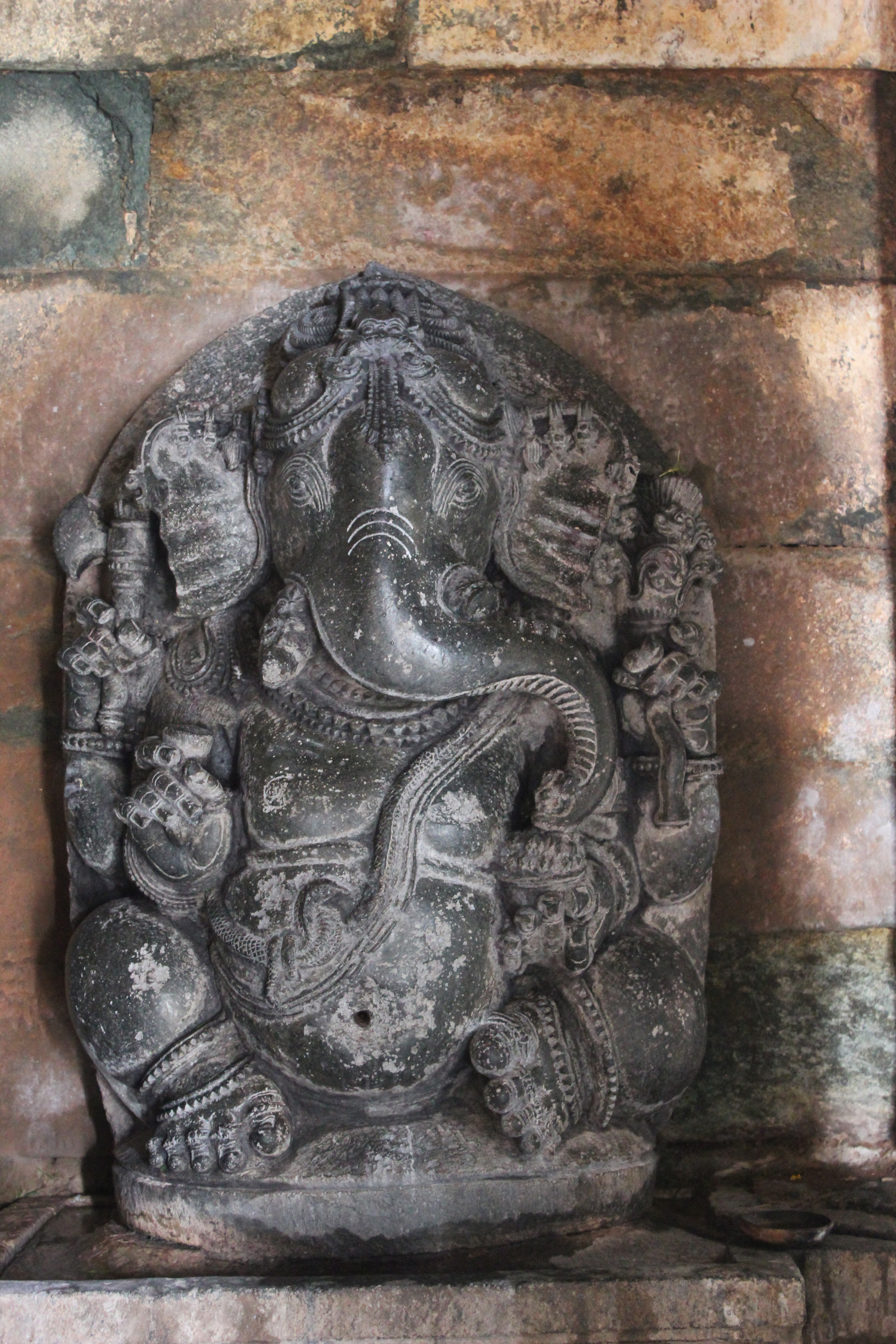
A sculpture of Hindu deity Ganesha in Kalleshwara temple, Hire Hadagali

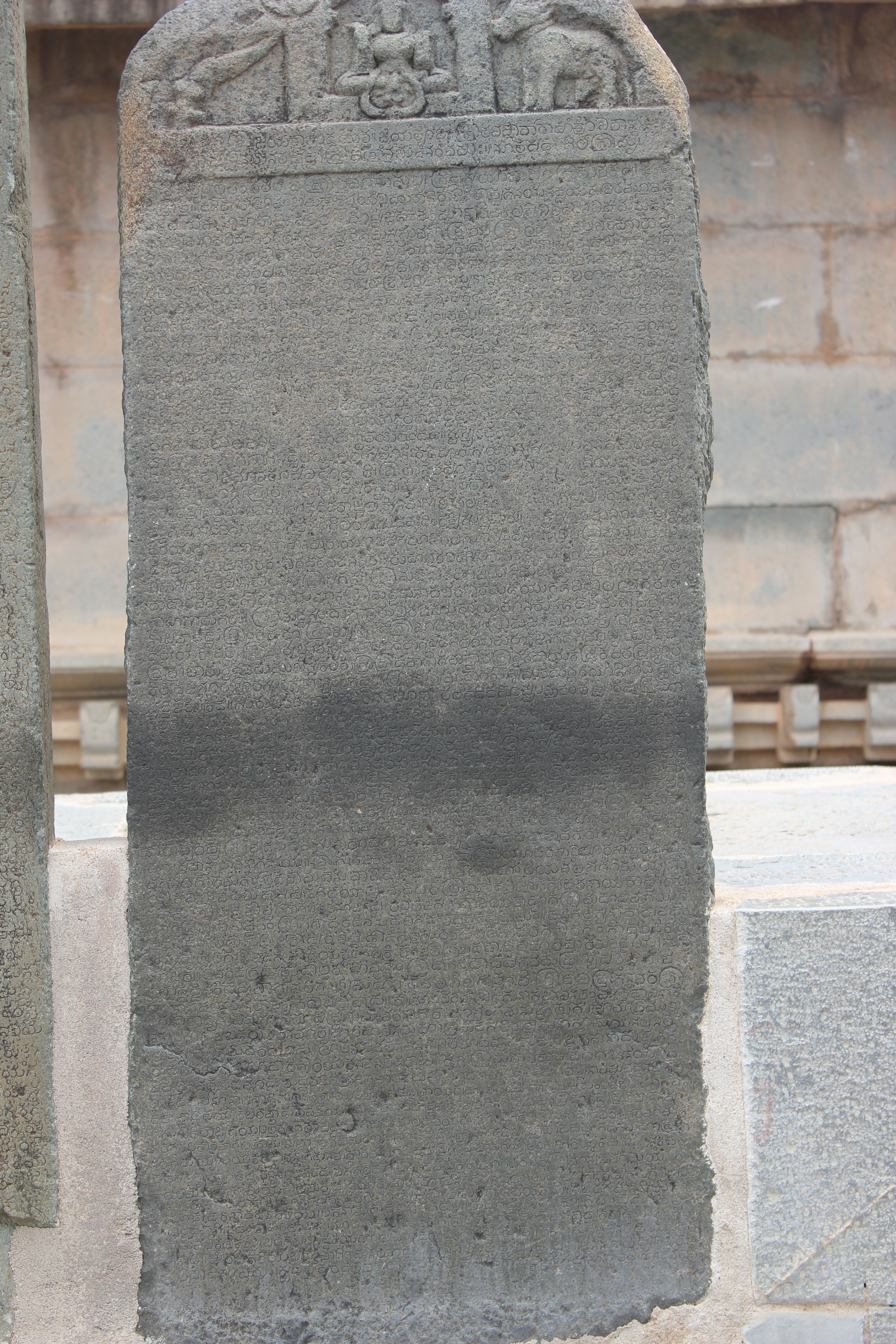
Old Kannada inscription dated 1108 A.D. from the rule of Vikramaditya VI gives details about the construction of the temple

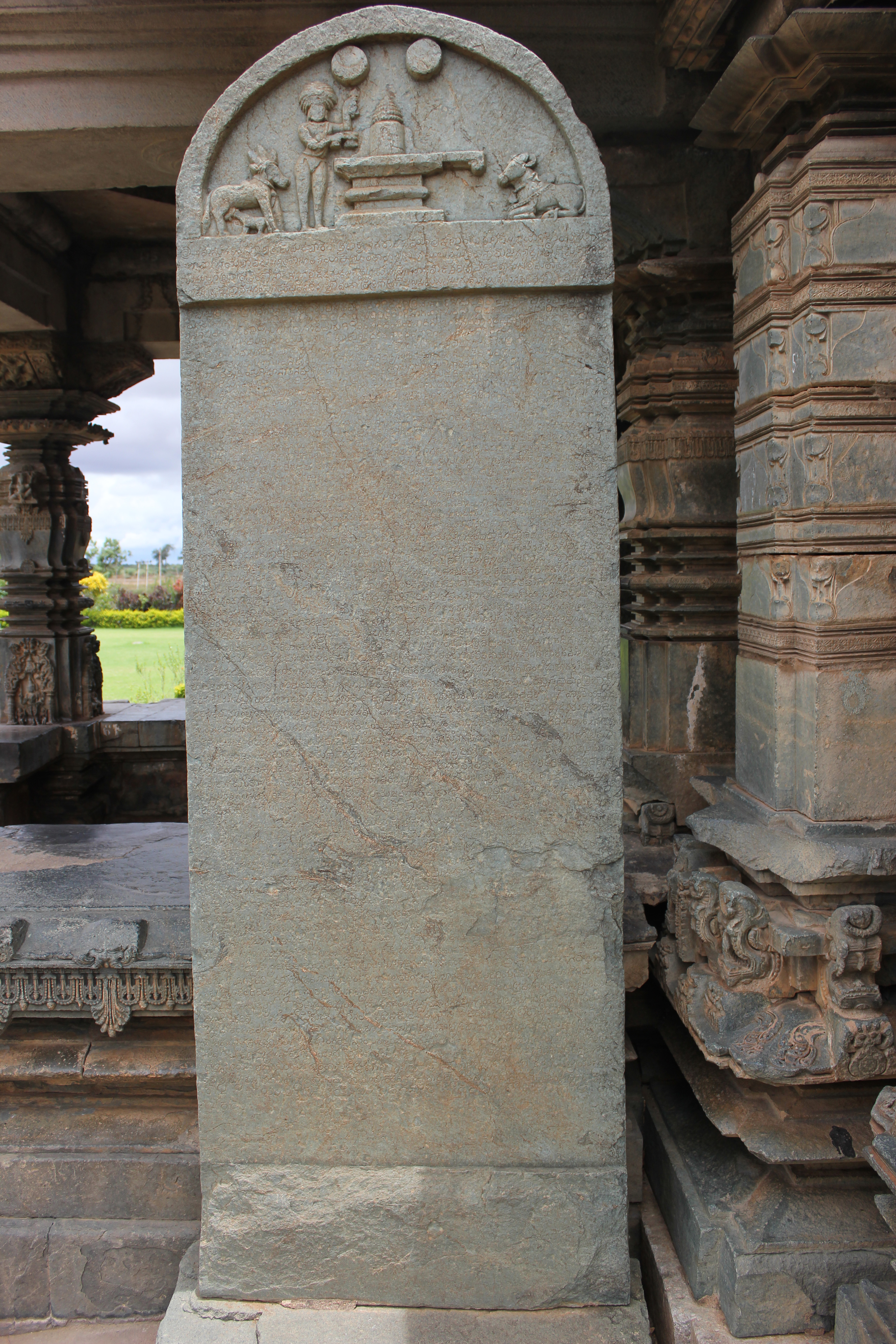
Old Kannada inscription (1212 A.D) of Hoysala King Veera Ballala II at Kalleshvara temple

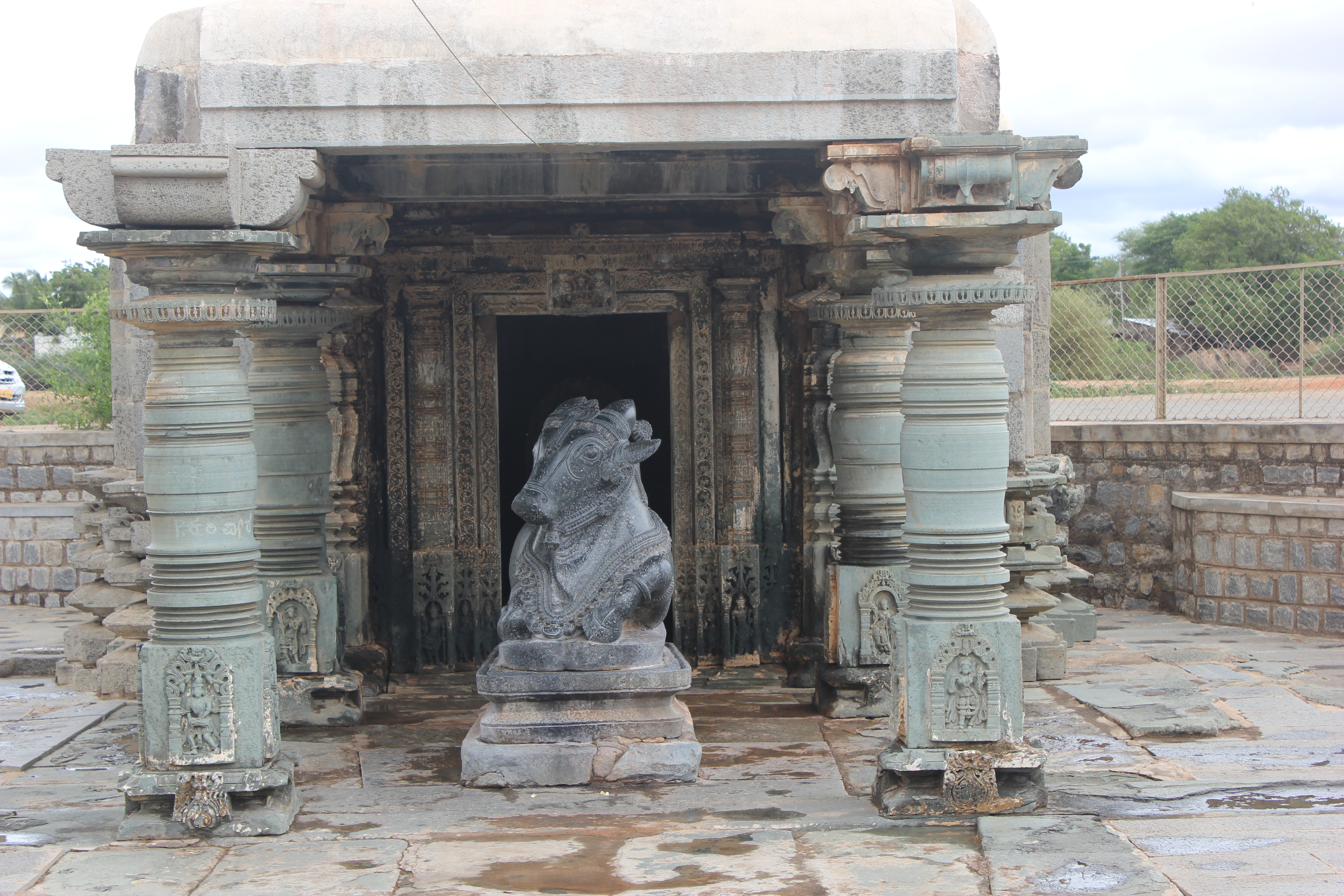
Nandimantapa (hall for Nandi the bull) in Kalleshvara temple at Hire Hadagali
