= Anavatti =

Anavatti Ane Hatti
- Town
- Location in Karnataka, India Anavatti (India)
- Coordinates: 14°33′48″N 75°09′06″E
- Country: India
- State: Karnataka
- District: Shivamogga
- Talukas: Soraba

Government
  - Body: Anavatti Town Panchayat

Population (2001)
  - Total: 8,168
- Demonym: Anavattiyavru

Languages
  - Official: Kannada
  - Regional: Anavatti Kannada
- Time zone: UTC+5:30 (IST)
- PIN: 577413
- Vehicle registration: KA 31 Sirsi; KA15 Sagara
- Website: Official website

Anavatti is a town in the Shivamogga district of Karnataka, India. Anavatti was previously known as Ane Hatti (transl. elephants sanctuary) during the Kadamba dynasty.

Anavatti is well known for the Kaitabheshwara Temple and an ancient Kotilingeshwara Temple located on the northern outskirts of time. It is on the border of 3 districts (Uttara Kannada, Shivamogga and Haveri). The main language spoken in Anavatti is Kannada and there is a great deal of religious diversity.

== Demographics ==
As of the 2001 census of India, Anavatti had a population of 8168 with 4059 males and 4109 females.

As of 2023 estimation, Anavatti has a population of 15000 with 8000 males and 7000 females.

== See also ==
- Sirsi
- Shimoga
- Districts of Karnataka
