= List of Monuments of National Importance in Dharwad district =

The following structures have been designated as Monuments of National Importance by the Archaeological Survey of India.

== List of monuments ==
SL. No.	Description	Location	Address	District	Coordinates	Image
N-KA-D224	Banashankaridevi temple	Amargol		Dharwad	15°23′57″N 75°05′14″E	Banashankaridevi temple More images
N-KA-D225	Sankaralinga temple	Amargol		Dharwad	15°23′57″N 75°05′14″E	Sankaralinga temple More images
N-KA-D226	Amritesvara temple	Annigeri		Dharwad	15°25′25″N 75°25′58″E	Amritesvara temple More images
N-KA-D227	Kalamesvara temple	Balambid		Dharwad	14°45′43″N 75°13′10″E	Upload Photo
N-KA-D228	Nagaresvara temple or Aravattu Kambadagudi	Bankapura		Haveri	14°55′33″N 75°14′59″E	Nagaresvara temple or Aravattu Kambadagudi More images
N-KA-D229	Inscribed memorial stones in a walled enclosure	Betageri		Gadag	15°26′40″N 75°38′44″E	Upload Photo
N-KA-D230	Muktesvara temple	Chudadanpur		Haveri	14°47′52″N 75°39′55″E	Muktesvara temple More images
N-KA-D231	Doddabasappa Temple	Dambal		Gadag	15°18′09″N 75°46′18″E	Doddabasappa Temple More images
N-KA-D232	Someshvara temple	Dambal		Gadag	15°18′08″N 75°46′16″E	Someshvara temple More images
N-KA-D233-a	Two forts gates (inner & outer): Inner gate	Dharwad		Dharwad	15°27′50″N 75°00′43″E	Upload Photo
N-KA-D233-b	Two forts gates (inner & outer): Outer gate	Dharwad		Dharwad	15°27′51″N 75°00′45″E	Two forts gates (inner & outer): Outer gate More images
N-KA-D234	Saraswati temple	Gadag		Gadag	15°25′28″N 75°37′36″E	Saraswati temple More images
N-KA-D235	Someshvara temple	Gadag		Gadag	15°25′44″N 75°37′36″E	Someshvara temple More images
N-KA-D236	Galagesvara temple	Galaganatha		Haveri	14°55′18″N 75°41′00″E	Galagesvara temple
N-KA-D237	Billeshwara Temple with a finely sculptured doorway.	Hangal		Haveri	14°45′17″N 75°07′23″E	Billeshwara Temple with a finely sculptured doorway. More images
N-KA-D238	Tarakesvara temple	Hangal		Haveri	14°45′55″N 75°07′26″E	Tarakesvara temple More images
N-KA-D239	Veerabhadra temple in Hangal Fort	Hangal		Haveri	14°45′34″N 75°07′37″E	Veerabhadra temple in Hangal Fort More images
N-KA-D240	Someshvara temple	Haralahalli		Haveri	14°50′08″N 75°40′27″E	Upload Photo
N-KA-D241	Kallesvara temple	Haralahalli		Haveri	14°50′09″N 75°40′28″E	Upload Photo
N-KA-D242	Siddhesvara Temple	Haveri		Haveri	14°47′26″N 75°24′39″E	Siddhesvara Temple More images
N-KA-D243	Two inscribed stones leaning against Shankaralinga temple to the left of the main Entrance.	Hombal		Gadag	15°31′03″N 75°33′21″E	Upload Photo
N-KA-D244	Brahma Jinalaya, Lakkundi	Lakkundi		Gadag	15°23′22″N 75°42′51″E	Brahma Jinalaya, Lakkundi More images
N-KA-D245	Kasivisvesvara Temple	Lakkundi		Gadag	15°23′15″N 75°43′01″E	Kasivisvesvara Temple More images
N-KA-D246	Kumbaresvara temple	Lakkundi		Gadag	15°23′25″N 75°43′13″E	Kumbaresvara temple More images
N-KA-D247	Manikesvara temple at Muskinbhavi	Lakkundi		Gadag	15°23′35″N 75°43′13″E	Manikesvara temple at Muskinbhavi More images
N-KA-D248	Muskin Bhavi	Lakkundi		Gadag	15°23′35″N 75°43′13″E	Muskin Bhavi More images
N-KA-D249	Naganatha near Jaina temple	Lakkundi		Gadag	15°23′25″N 75°42′51″E	Naganatha near Jaina temple More images
N-KA-D250	Nannesvara Temple, Lakkundi	Lakkundi		Gadag	15°23′14″N 75°43′00″E	Nannesvara Temple, Lakkundi More images
N-KA-D251	Sarvesvara temple	Naregal		Gadag	14°49′51″N 75°16′48″E	Upload Photo
N-KA-D252	Stone inscription inside the Shankaralinga temple	Nargund		Dharwad	15°43′20″N 75°23′00″E	Upload Photo
N-KA-D253	Kadambesvara temple	Rattihalli		Haveri	14°25′14″N 75°30′59″E	Upload Photo
N-KA-D254	Basavanna temple	Tamboor		Dharwad	15°05′48″N 74°55′47″E	Basavanna temple More images
N-KA-D255	Chandramouleshwara Temple	Unkal,Hubli		Dharwad	15°22′37″N 75°06′59″E	Chandramouleshwara Temple More images

== See also ==
- List of Monuments of National Importance in Bangalore circle
- List of Monuments of National Importance in Belgaum district
- List of Monuments of National Importance in Bidar district
- List of Monuments of National Importance in Bijapur district
- List of Monuments of National Importance in Gulbarga district
- List of Monuments of National Importance in North Kanara district
- List of Monuments of National Importance in Raichur district
- List of Monuments of National Importance in India for other Monuments of National Importance in India
- List of State Protected Monuments in Karnataka
