= Western Chalukya temples =

Temples in India

Some famous temples built by the Western Chalukyas, referred to as the "Later Chalukya art" that flourished in and around the Tungabhadra River districts of modern Karnataka state, India, are included in the table below.

Famous Western Chalukya temples in Karnataka (973–1200)
Name	Location	District	Period
Bhutanatha	Badami	Bagalkot	11th century
Mallikarjuna group	Badami	Bagalkot	11th century
Yellamma	Badami	Bagalkot	11th century
Amrtesvara	Annigeri	Dharwad	1050 C.E.
Brahma Jinalaya	Lakkundi	Gadag	11th century
Kasivisvesvara	Lakkundi	Gadag	1086 C.E.
Veeranarayana	Gadag	Gadag	1098 C.E.
Nannesvara	Lakkundi	Gadag	11th century
Muktesvara	Chavudayyadanapura	Haveri	12th century
Siddhesvara	Haveri	Haveri	11th century
Tarakesvara	Hangal	Haveri	12th century
Ganapati	Hangal	Haveri	12th century
Galageshwara	Galaganatha	Haveri	11th century
Sarweshwara	Naregal	Haveri	11th century
Parsvanatha basadi	Shravanabelagola	Hassan	1083 C.E.
Arvattukhamba	Bankapura	Haveri	1091 C.E.
Shambulinga	Kundgol	Dharwad	11th century
Santesvara	Tilavalli	Haveri	12th century
Kaithabesvara	Kubatur	Shimoga	1100 C.E.
Trimurtinarayana	Bandalike	Shimoga	1160 C.E.
Mahadeva	Itagi	Koppal	1112 C.E.
Mallikarjuna	Kuruvatti	Bellary	11th century
Bhimeshvara	Nilagunda	Davangere	1075-1100 C.E.
Kallesvara	Bagali	Davangere	986 C.E.
Kedareshvara	Balligavi	Shimoga	1060 C.E.
Tripurantakesvara	Balligavi	Shimoga	1070 C.E.
Gandabherundesvara	Balligavi	Shimoga	1060 C.E.
Trikutesvara & Sarasvati	Gadag	Gadag	1070 C.E.
Dodda Basappa	Dambal	Gadag	12th century
Chandramaulesvara	Unkal	Dharwad	11th century
Jod-Kalasa Gudi	Sudi	Gadag	1060 C.E.
Mallikarjuna	Sudi	Gadag	1030 C.E.
Kumbhesvara	Lakkundi	Gadag	11th century
Naganatha	Lakkundi	Gadag	11th century
Manikesvara	Lakkundi	Gadag	11th century
Basavesvara	Basavana Bagevadi	Bijapur	1050 C.E.
Somesvara	Lakshmeshwara	Gadag	12th century
Kallesvara	Hirehadagali	Bellary	1057 C.E.
Kadambesvara	Rattihalli	Haveri	12th century
Kamalanarayana	Degaon	Belgaum	12th century
Dattatreya	Chattarki	Bijapur	12th century
Kallesvara	Huvvinahadagalli	Bellary	12th century
Kallesvara	Ambali	Bellary	1083 C.E.
Mahadeva	Jalsingi	Bidar	12th century
