= Banashankari (disambiguation) =

Banashankari is a locality in Bangalore, Karnataka, India.

Banashankari may also refer to:

- Banashankari Amma Temple, a Hindu temple located at Cholachagudd near Badami, in Bagalkot district, Karnataka, India
- Banashankari Temple, Amargol, a Hindu temple located in between Dharwad and Hubli, Karnataka, India
- Banashankari (film), a 1977 Indian Kannada film
