= Chandramauleshwara Temple, Unkal =

11th-century Shiva temple in Karnataka, India

Chandramauleshwara temple at Unkal
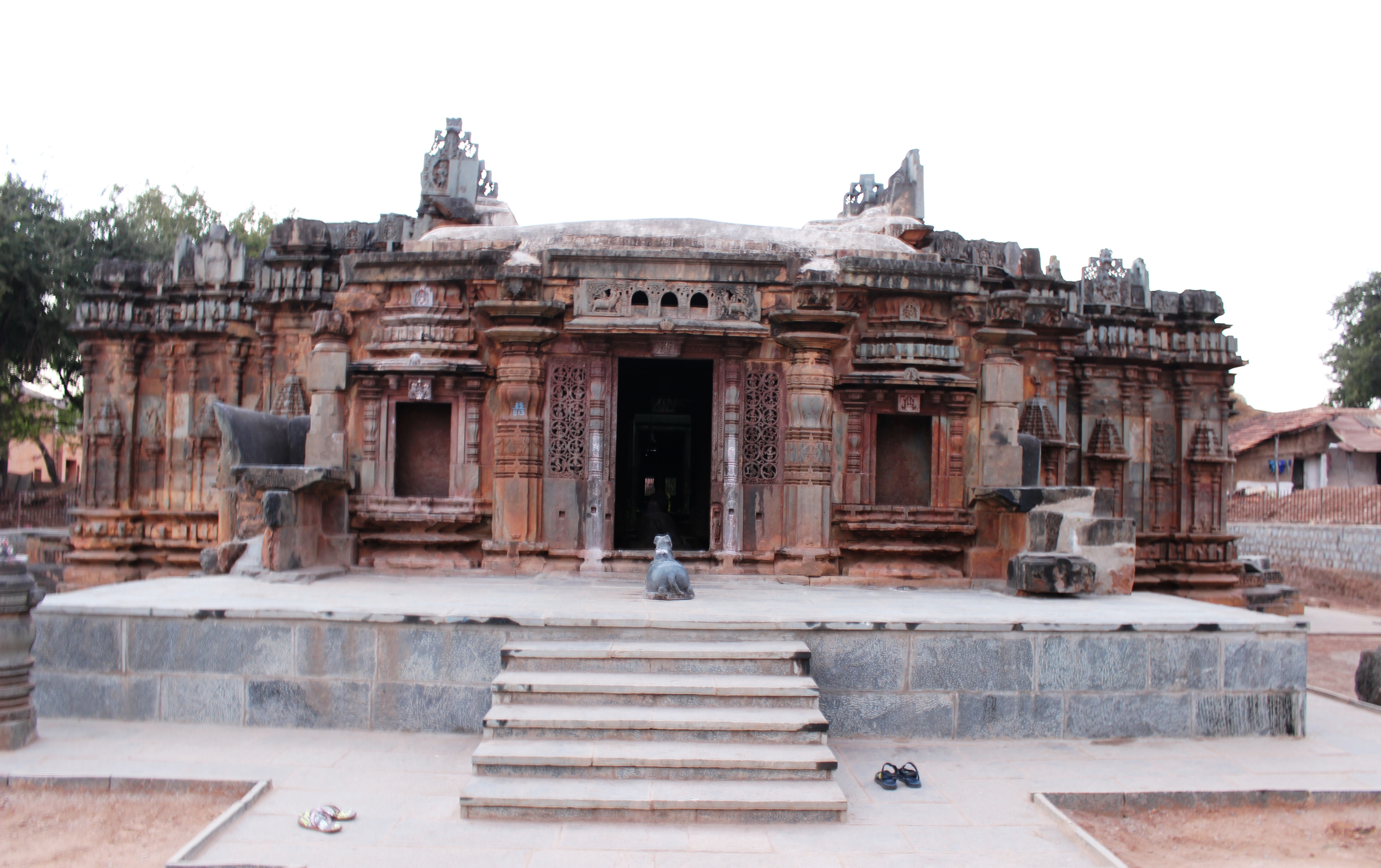

- Location within India Location within Karnataka

Religion
- Affiliation: Hinduism
- District: Dharwad
- Deity: Shiva

Location
- Location: Hubballi
- State: Karnataka
- Country: India
- Coordinates: 15°22′36.4″N 75°07′00″E

Architecture
- Creator: Bommanna Dandanayaka
- Completed: c. 1085 CE

The Chandramauleshwara Temple, sometimes referred to as the Candramauḷĩśvara or Chandramouleshwara temple at Unkal, is an 11th-century Shiva temple with Chalukyan architecture in Unkal (Hubballi), Karnataka, India. It is built on a square-cross plan with one entrance for each cardinal direction, corresponding to the sandhara plan found in Sanskrit texts on architecture. It originally had a Chaturmukha (four-faced) Linga in the center of the temple and many more mandapas (halls), but the surviving structure is much smaller.

The temple preserves an early example of a relatively uncommon Hindu architecture. It is also notable for how it integrates the artwork of Shaivism, Vaishnavism, Shaktism and Vedic deities together.

It is a Monument of National importance and is designated as a Protected Monument under the Ancient Monuments and Archaeological Sites Act (1958). It is managed by the Dharwad circle of the Archaeological Survey of India (ASI).

== Location and date ==
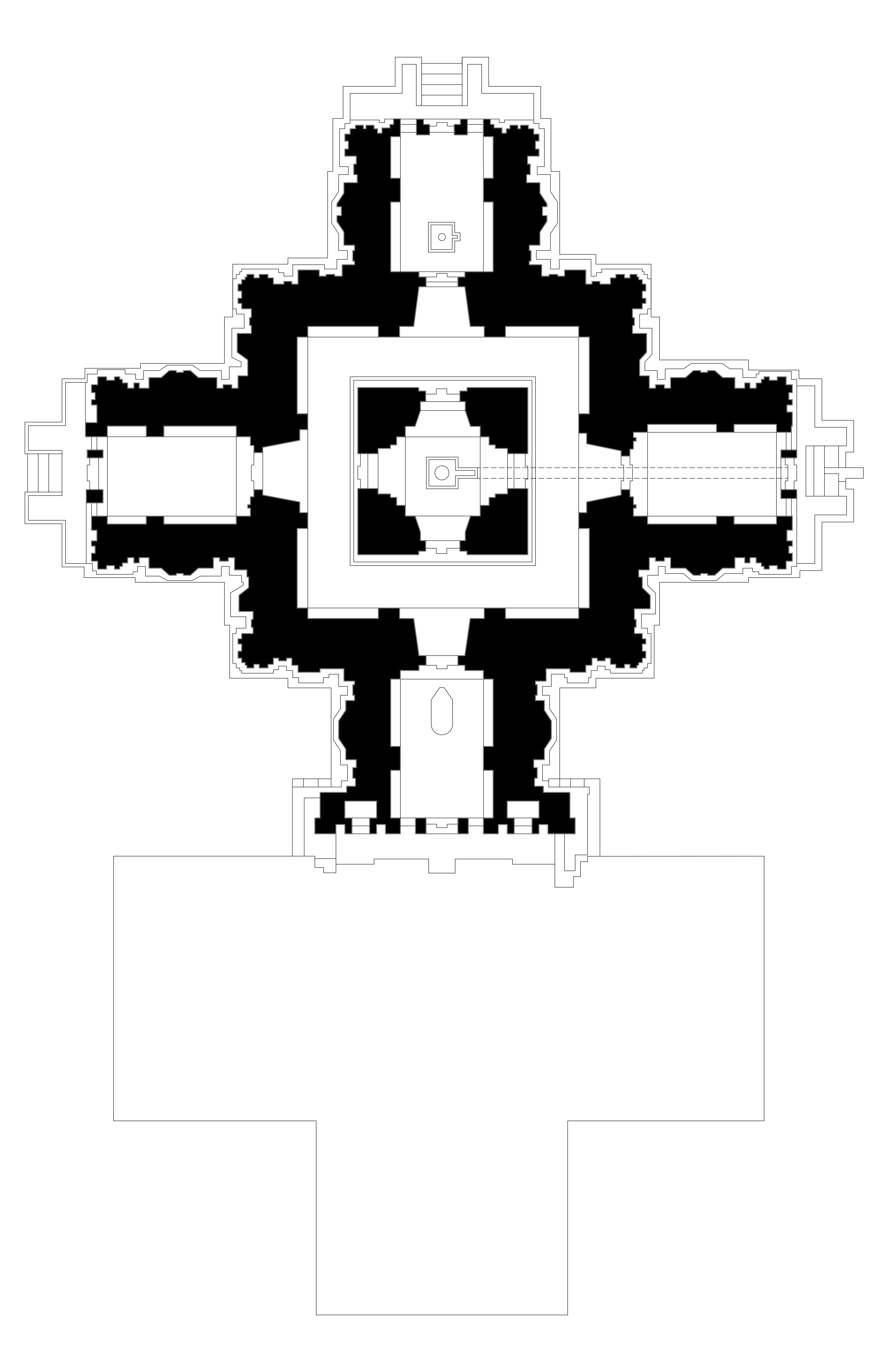
Floor plan

The Chandramauleshwara Temple is located in Unkal, Hubli City east of the Unkal lake (NH 67, Old NH4). Unkal was historically named as Unukal and Unukallu, is within the Hubli-Dharwad municipality.

Chandramouleshwar is a monument from the Kalyana Chalukyan era. It lacks a foundation inscription, and its date thus has to be indirectly inferred by other inscriptions that mention it, architectural style and iconographic details. According to Dakhy and Meister – scholars known for their encyclopedia on India temple architecture and history, these factors suggest that "a date no later than the eighties of the 11th century seems admissible".

The presence of two 12th-century stone inscriptions in Unkal village show that the temple was built in or before the 12th century. The Archaeological Survey of India assigns it to the 12th century.

== Architecture ==
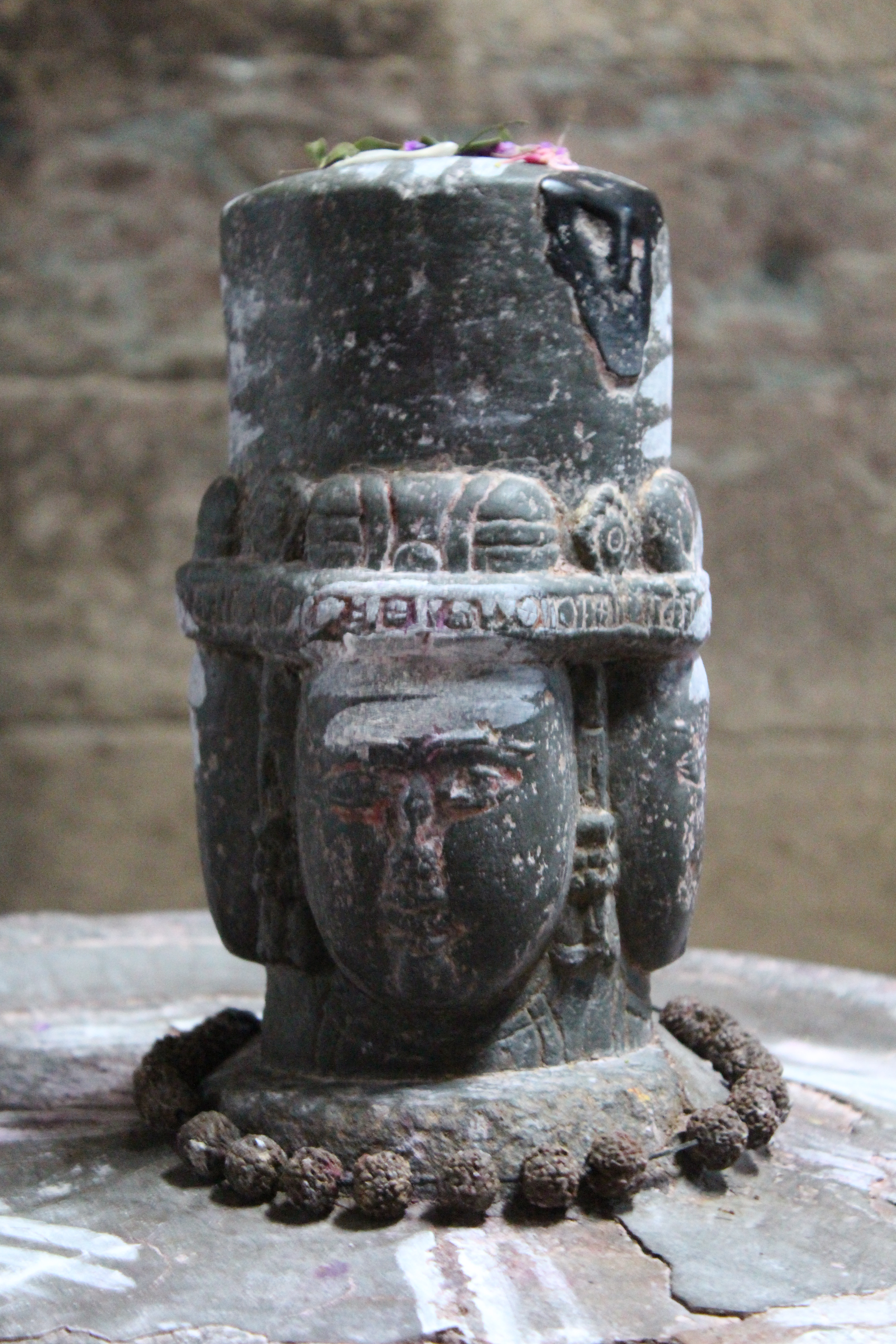
Four-faced Shiva lingam, one of the faces

The temple is a remarkable building that illustrates the sandhara plan, with a square garbhagriha that can accessed from four cardinal directions. This open from all sides plan comes with four molded walls each with decorated doors. The doorjambs are decorated with pancha shakhas (five concentric band of fine carvings), but the artisans made each door unique. The eastern door is particularly excellent, one of the best from the 11th century. Each door has a pair of dwarapalas. The temple includes a pradakshina patha for circumambulation. It also has an antarala and a sarvatobhadra-style mukhamandapa.

The outer walls include the architectural and decorative details in major Hindu temples, but to accommodate the four entrances, the temple integrates ardha-mandapas that function as antaralas. The original temple had mukhamandapas on the north and south side for the pilgrims to gather, but that is now lost and only mutilated and damaged sections of these sections can now be traced. The details in and above the mancabandha adhistana are elegant, with a band of flowers, then alternating horse-elephant rajasena, above which is the vedikas with miniature but beautiful musicians, then gandharas framed between aedicules, topped with wood/jewel-like detail kaksasana carvings.

The jalas in this temple are of two types – gulika and puspakantha – both elegantly completed, with timber-like finish.

Originally, the temple housed the image of Chaturmukha linga at the very center so that the pilgrim could see one face of Shiva no matter where she or he stood. However, at some point, this was moved and it is now in the western side of the temple. One possible explanation was offered by Henry Cousens after his survey of this site. The temple likely suffered destruction after the 13th century, went into disuse. The "very dilapidated" temple was later appropriated by Lingayats who moved the Chaturmukha linga and replaced it with a plain linga they preferred.

The outer walls of the temple have niches framed with pilasters. These depict a galaxy of deities and Hindu legends from all the major traditions within Hinduism: Brahma, avatars of Vishnu, and various forms of Siva. Of particular note are the Nataraja, Narasimha, dancing Ganesha, Sarasvati and Mahishasurmardini. Another notable feature here is that two of the four lalitabimbas into the sanctum have Gajalakshmi and two have Sarasvati, a fact that led Cousens to suggest that this temple may be much older than the 11th century and might once have been a Brahma temple.

== Conservation and restoration ==
Archaeological Survey of India (ASI) had begun work on the temple premises very long back. It started work on a compound wall to prevent further encroachments, but this work too remains incomplete.

== Unkal Lake ==
Unkal Lake is one of the water sources of Hubli-Dharwad and a picnic spot. Unkal Lake has a boating facility. Unkal lake is the origin of river Bedti. This river flows through the western ghats and drains in Arabian sea. Also, Bedti river joins Shalmala river near Kalaghatagi and together they flow as river Gangavali.

Unkal Lake is one of the water sources of Hubli-Dharwad and a picnic spot. Unkal Lake has a boating facility.↵Unkal lake is the origin of river Bedti. This river flows through the western ghats and drains in Arabian sea. Also, Bedti river joins Shalmala river near Kalaghatagi and together they flow as river Gangavali. Origin of river Shalmala is temple Dharwad.

== Gallery ==
11th century Chandramouleshwar Temple at Unkal

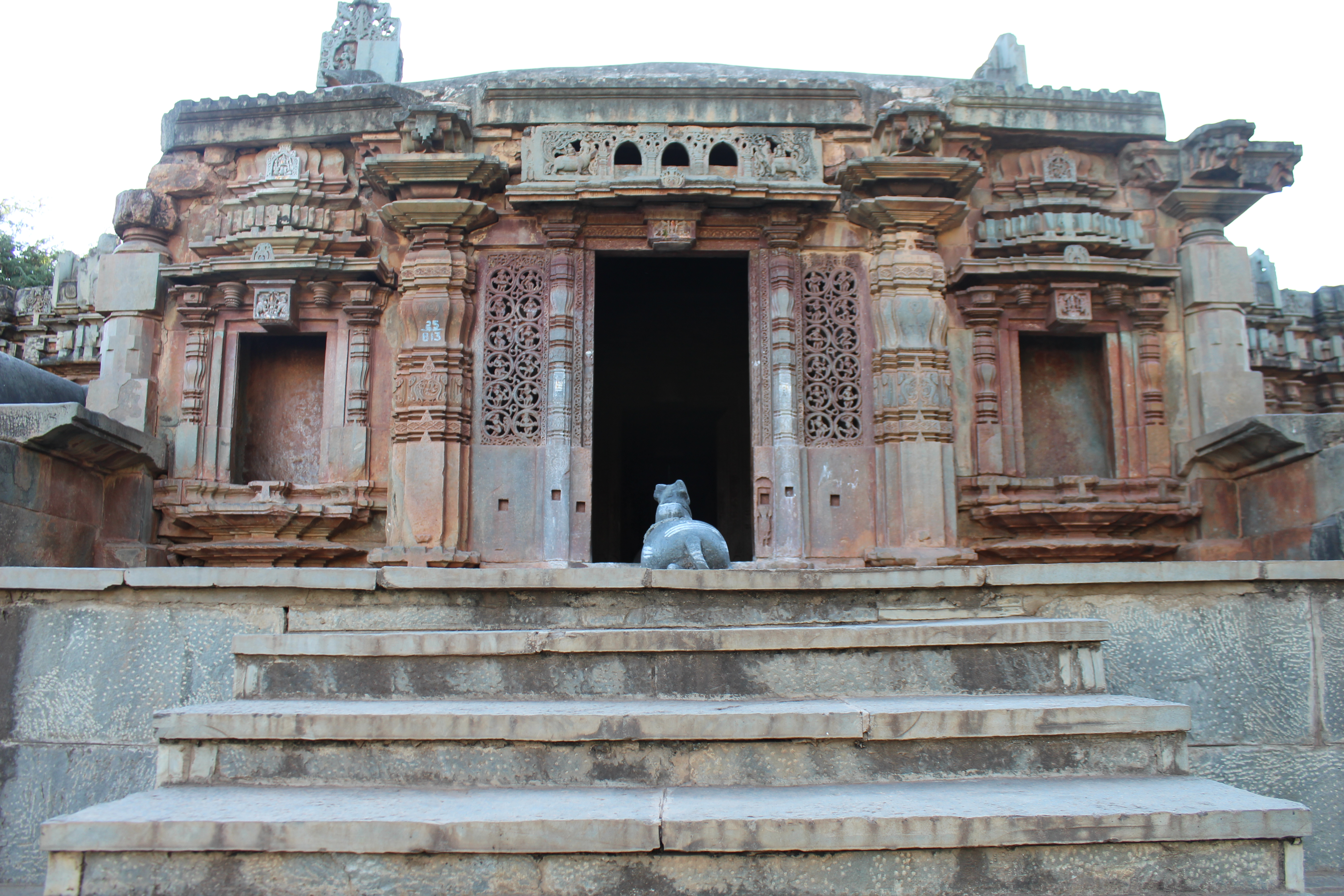
Main entrance, seen from outside

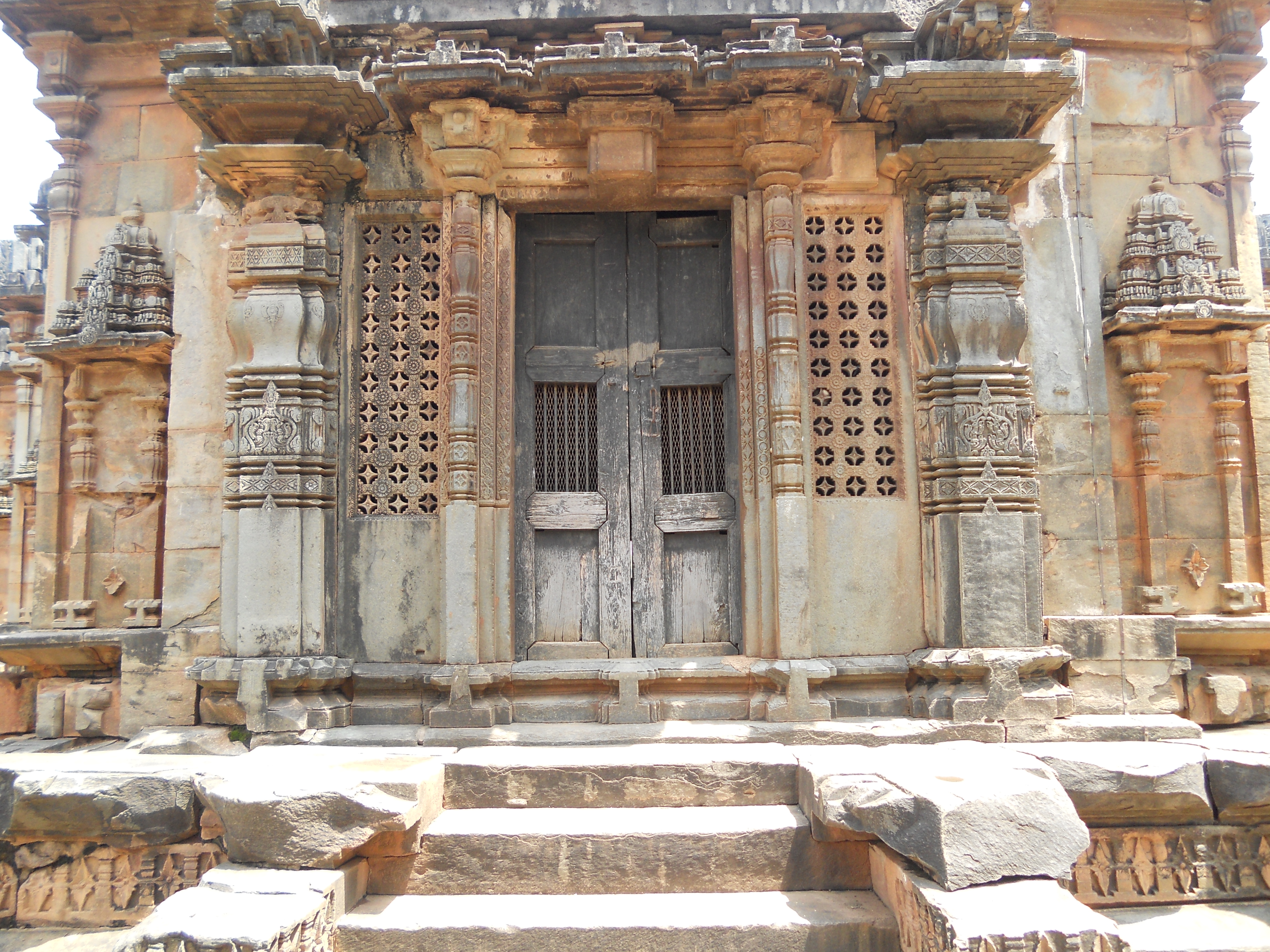

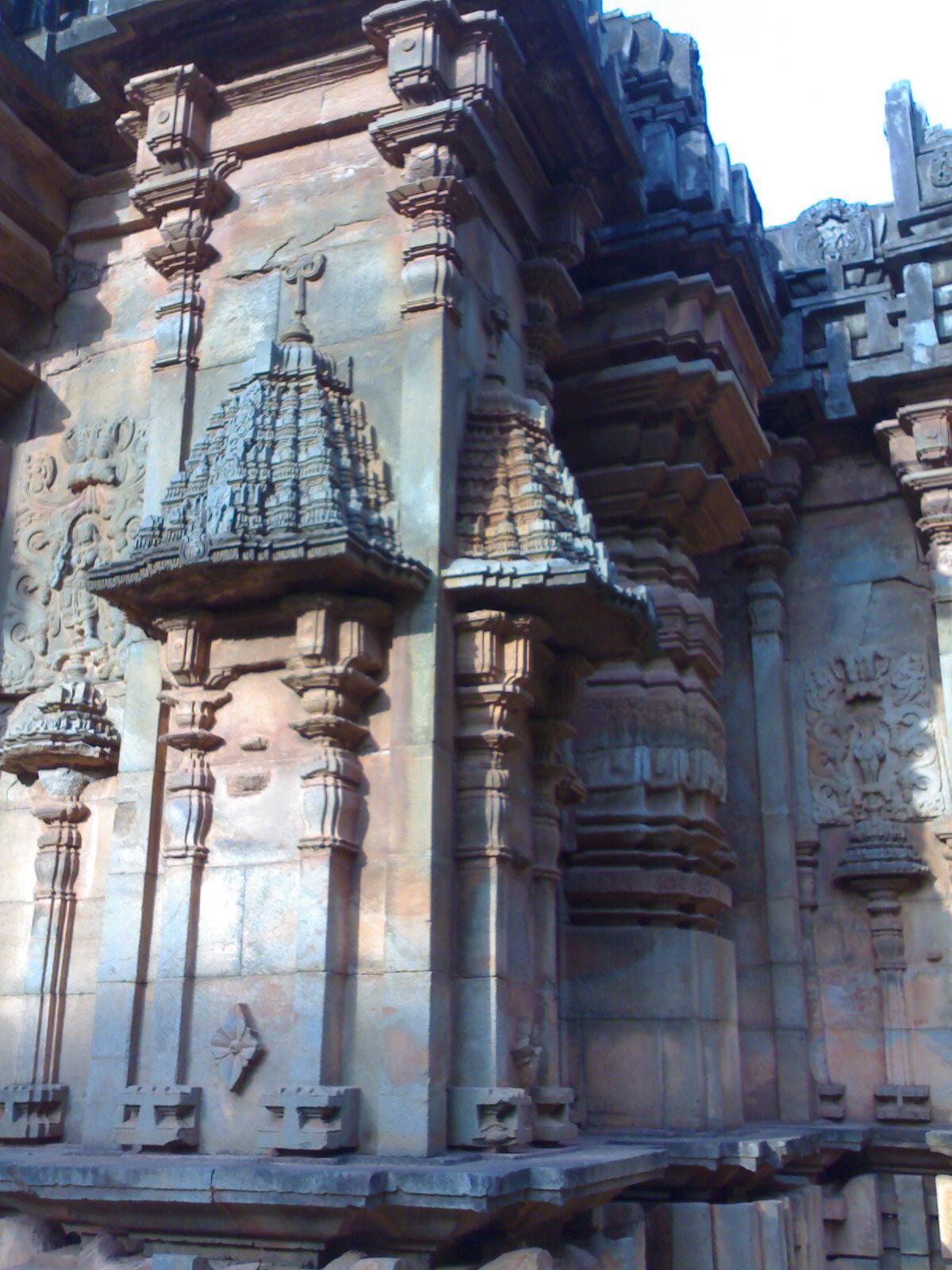

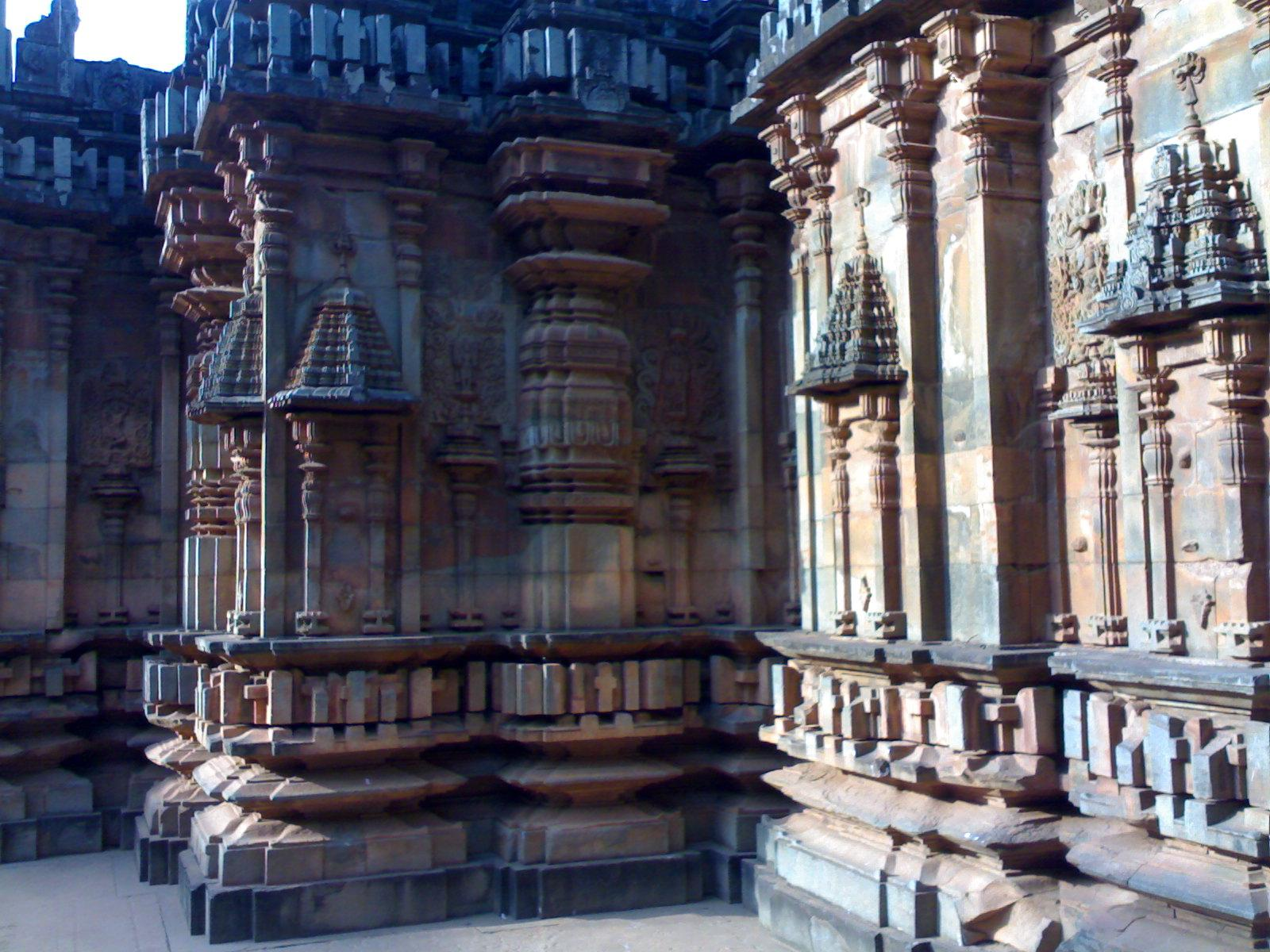

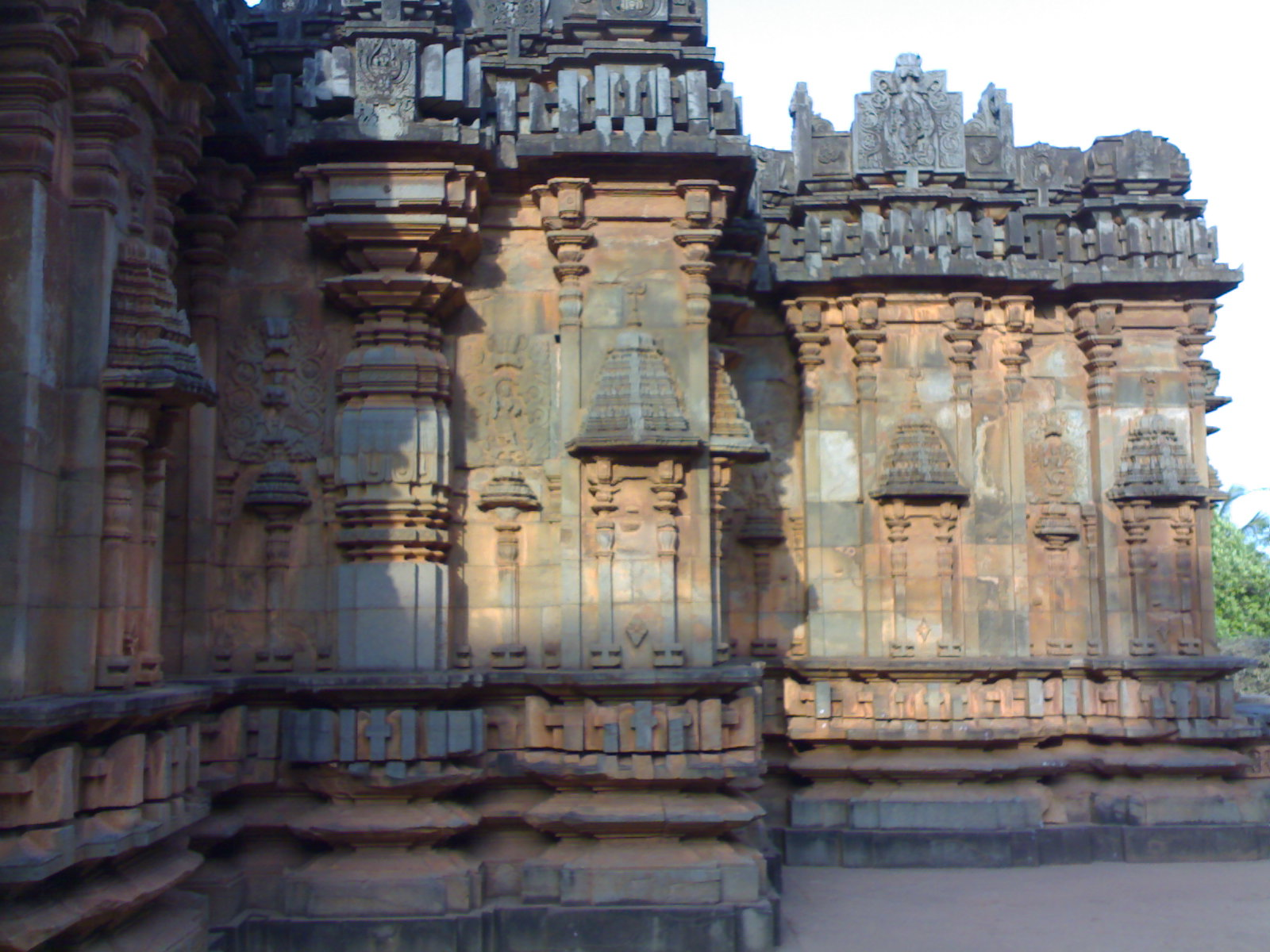
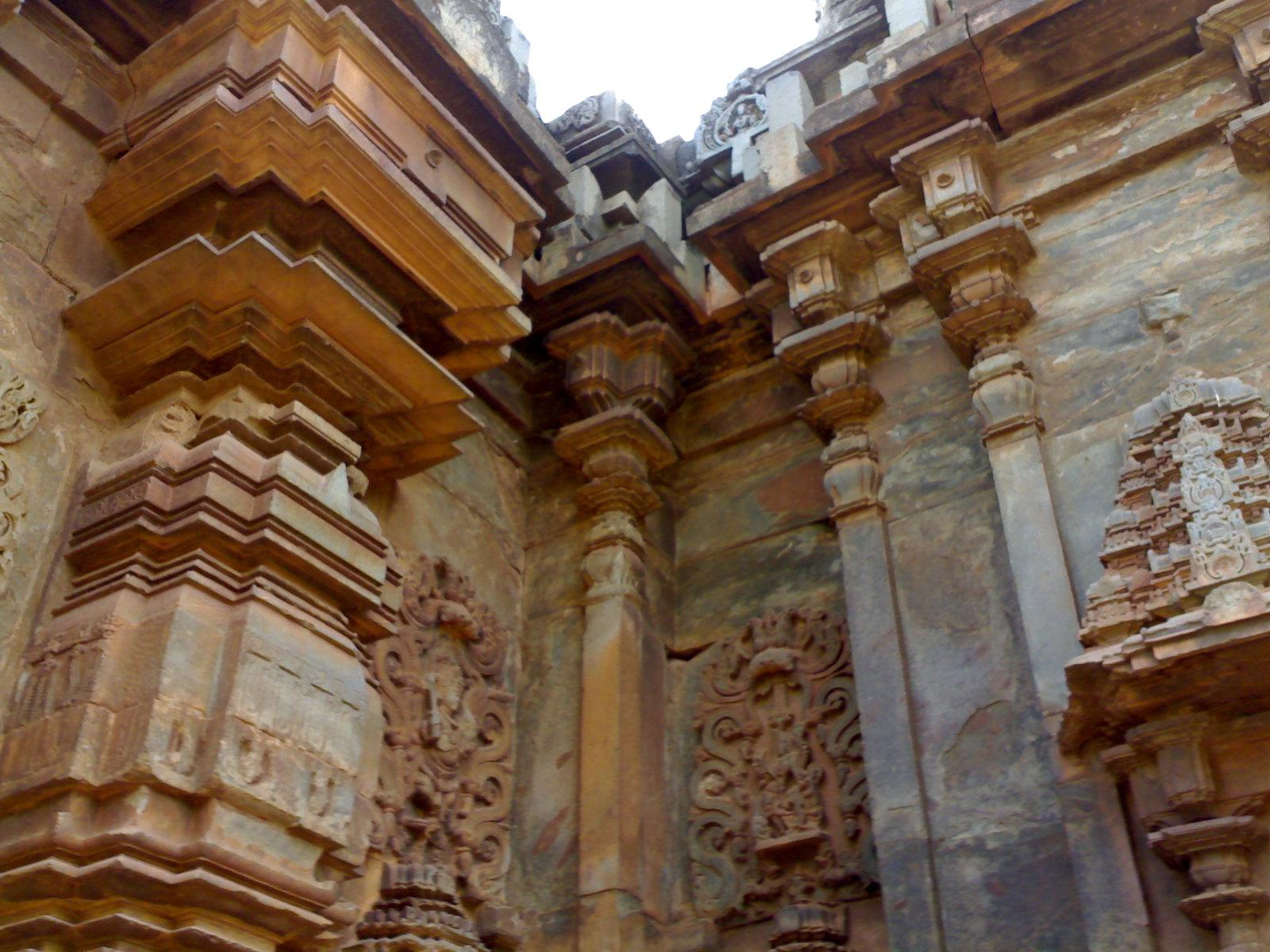

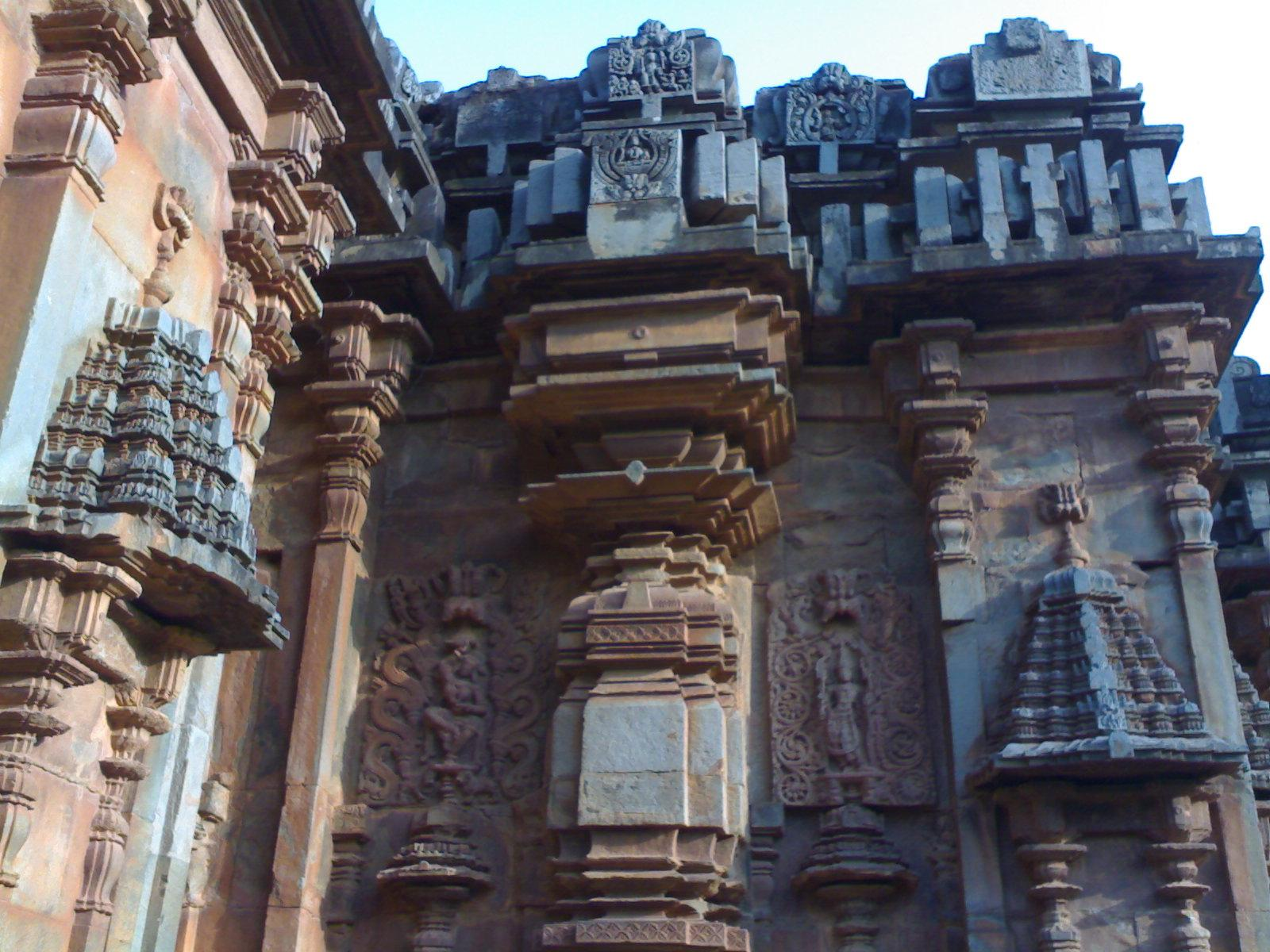

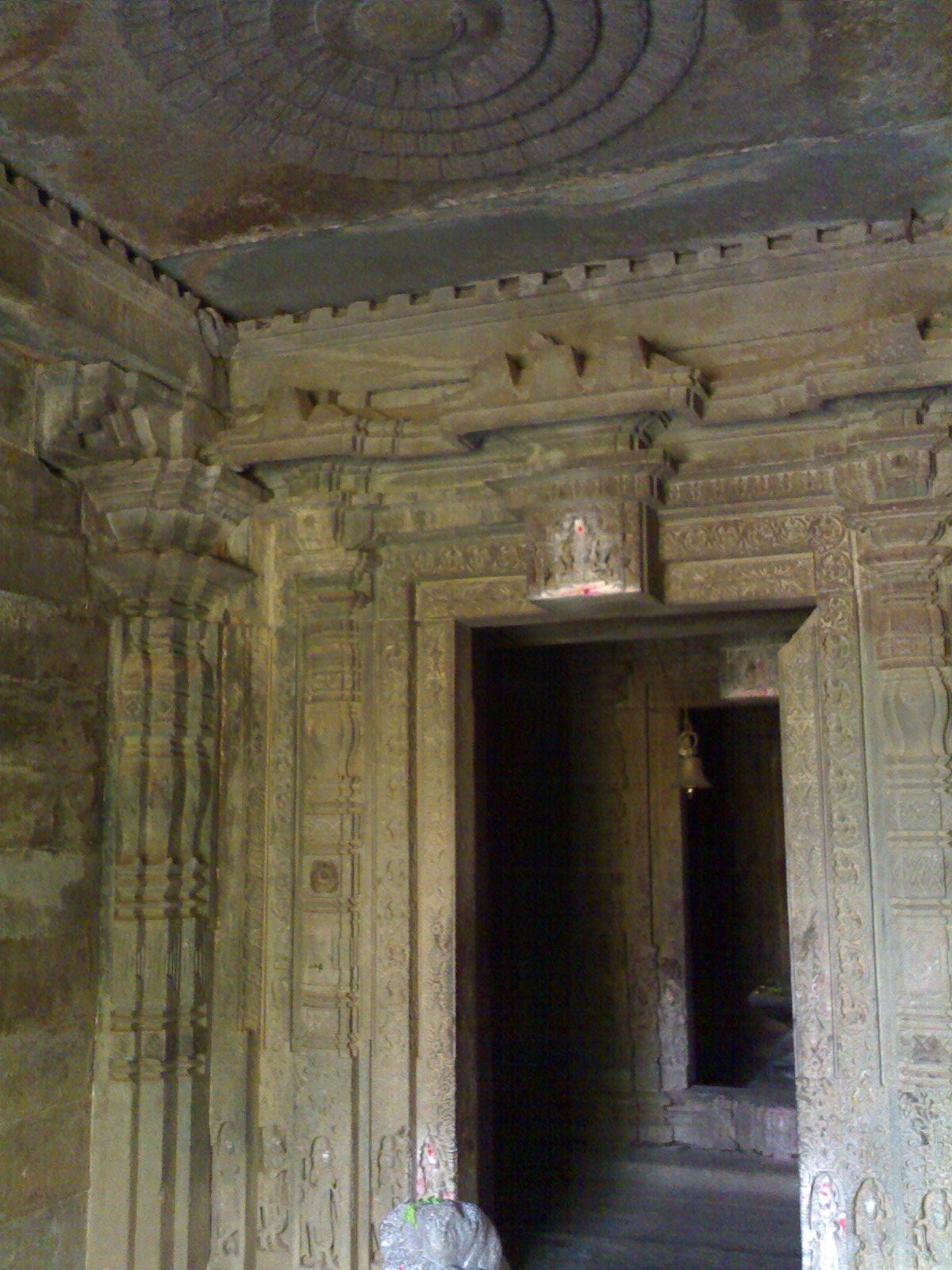

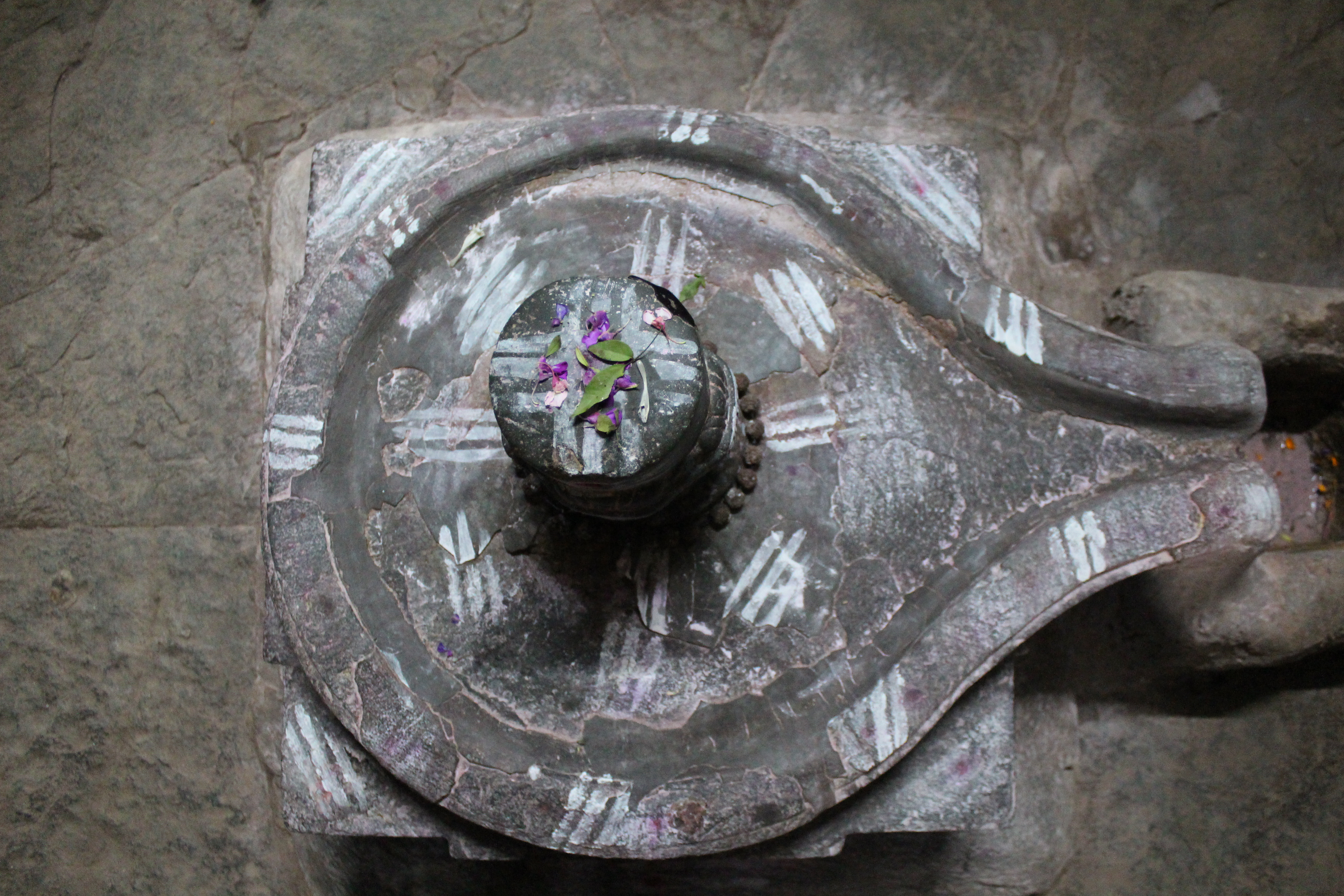
Chaturmukhi (Four-faced) Shiva lingam, from top

== See also ==
- Annigeri
- Banashankari Temple Amargol
- Bankapura
- Halasi
- Haveri
- Hooli
- Kundgol
- Lakshmeshwar
- North Karnataka
- Tamboor
- Tourism in North Karnataka
- Western Chalukyas
- Western Chalukya architecture
