= Nannesvara Temple, Lakkundi =

11th century Hindu temple in Lakkundi, Gadag district, Karnataka, India

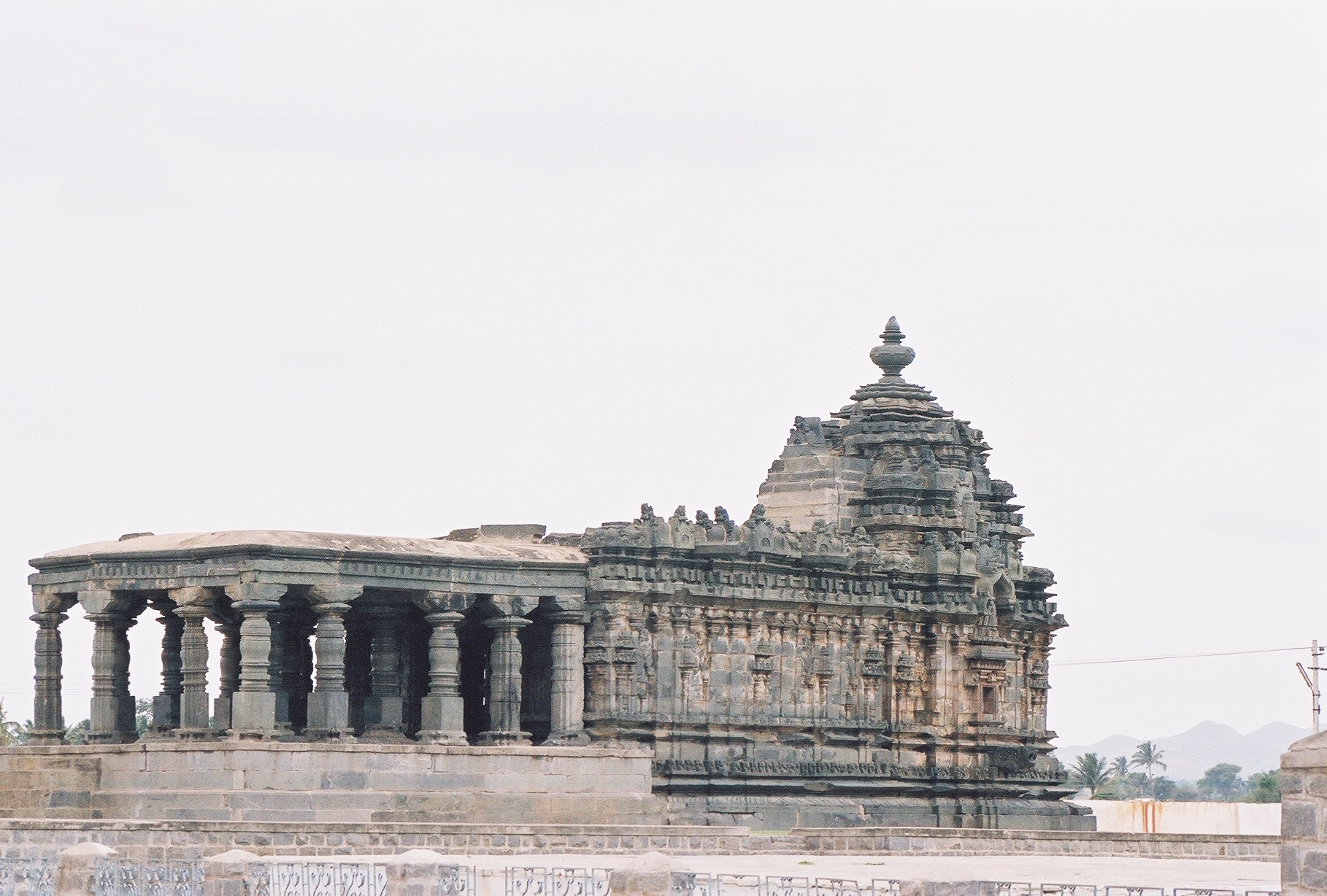
- Nannesvara temple

- Location within Karnataka Nannesvara Temple, Lakkundi (India)

Religion
- Affiliation: Hinduism
- Deity: Shiva
- Governing body: Archaeological Survey of India

Location
- Location: Lakkundi, Karnataka
- Coordinates: 15°23′14.6″N 75°42′59.4″E

Architecture
- Style: Western Chalukya architecture
- Established: 1020–30 CE
- Temple: 1

The Nannesvara Temple, also referred to as the Nanneshvara temple, is an 11th-century Hindu temple in Lakkundi, Gadag district, Karnataka. It is notable for being the earliest known imperial-style temple of the Kalyana Chalukyas, one with significant influences from both North Indian and South Indian schools of Hindu architecture. It stands immediately west to the much larger and more ornate Kasivisvesvara twin Temple in a similar style.

The temple is protected as a monument of national importance by the Archaeological Survey of India.

== Location ==
Lakkundi is about 12 kilometers from the twin city of Gadag-Betageri, between Hampi and Goa, connected by India's National Highway 67. A home to numerous ruins of historic Hindu and Jain temples, Lakkundi is geographically located in a region with many major temple groups from the Kalachuris, Chalukyas, Yadavas-Seunas, Hoysalas and Vijayanagara era. For example, it is close to historic temples found in Dambal, Kukkanur, Gadag, Annigeri, Mulgund, Harti, Laksmesvara, Kalkeri, Savadi, Hooli, Rona, Sudi, Koppal, and Itagi. The nearest Railway station is in Gadag city. The Nannesvara temple is located to the west of Kasivisvesvara temple, towards the south of the village.

== History ==
Lakkundi is phonetically shortened name of the historic city of Lokkigundi, a name found in inscriptions in the village and those quite far in southern Karnataka and Maharashtra. Over 30 inscriptions from Lakkundi and other parts of Deccan region, in Kannada and Sanskrit, from the 8th to 13th century attest to the importance of Lakkundi as a historic city to both Hindu and Jain traditions.

Though Lakkundi was an established town in the second half of the 1st millennium, its growth and wealth came after 973 CE when Taila II, a Chalukya of Vatapi descendant and chieftain appointed in 965 CE, organized a successful revolt against Karkka II of the Rashtrakuta dynasty. In regional texts, the reign that followed is called Cālukya (Later Chalukyas, Kalyani Chalukyas, or Chalukyas of Kalyana) to distinguish them from the Calukya (Early Chalukyas). Lakkundi flowered and grew with the Shiva-tradition Hindu monarch Satyasraya Irivabedanga – the successor and son of Taila II who came to power in 997 or 998 CE. This is attested by both Jain and Hindu inscriptions of early 11th-century.

Lakkundi grew to be a major city, prosperous and one with a mint. Lakkundi and several historic towns to its north – such as Rona, Sudi, Kradugu now known as Gadag, Hooli and others – attracted a burst of religious, cultural and literary flowering from the 11th to 13th century, with ever more sophisticated temple architectures, Vidyadana (charity supported schools) and public works such as step wells. These are largely in the context of Shaivism and Jainism, though a few major temples of Vaishnavism here are also from this period. In 1192 CE, after many of the remarkable temples of Lakkundi were already standing, a Sanskrit inscription of Hoysala king Ballala II re-affirms the continued importance of Lakkundi and it becoming his capital. After the 13th-century, there is an abrupt end to all evidence of new public works, temples, inscriptions and other indirect signs of economic prosperity in Lakkundi.

=== Date ===
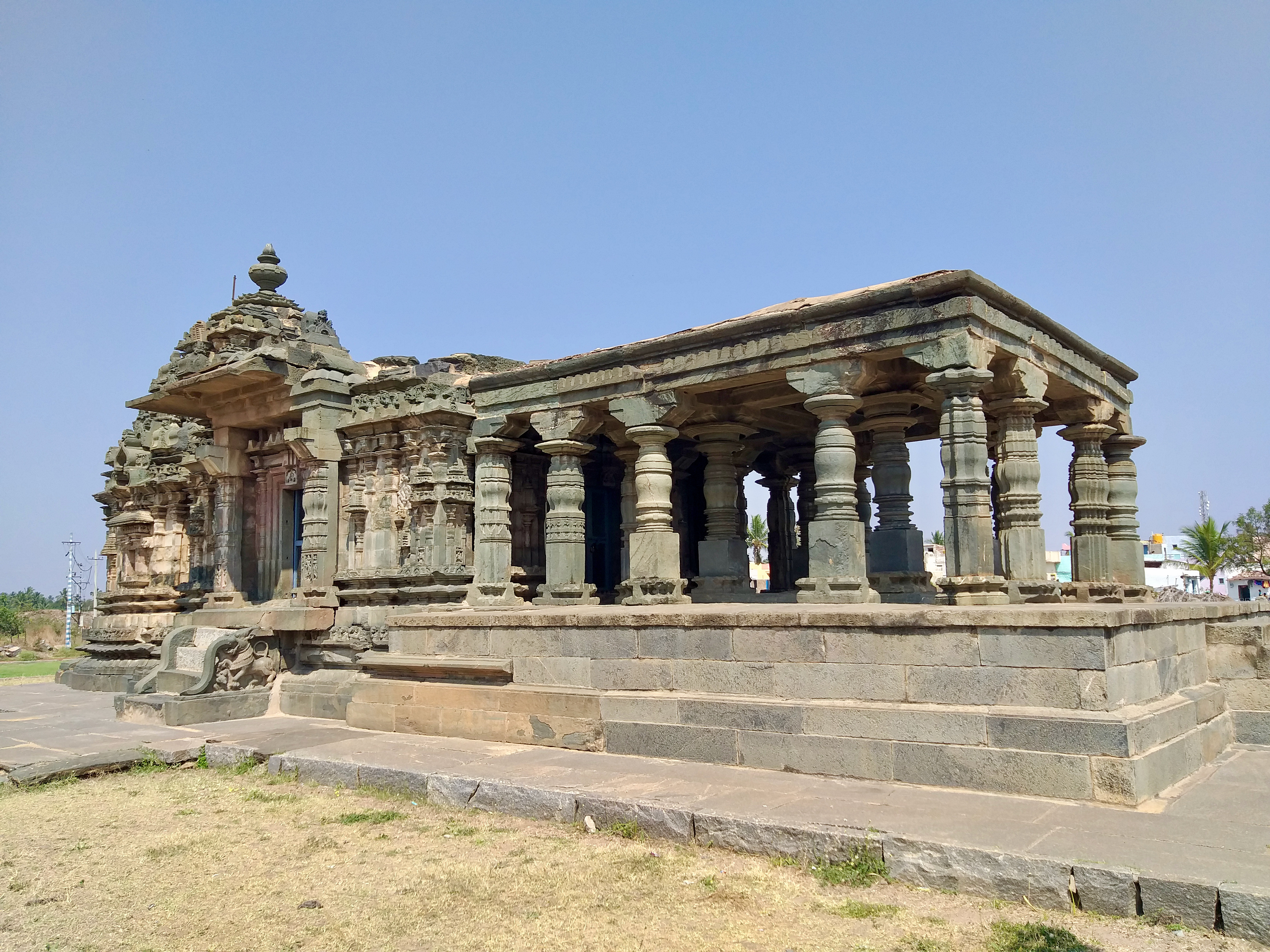
Nannesvara temple

There is no surviving foundation inscription at Nannesvara. All estimates are based on the secondary inscriptions that mention this temple, the architecture style and iconographic details in the context of the historic Lakkundi school, combined with the assumption that more complex and elaborate versions build upon and follow simpler versions. Dhaky and Meister, scholars with numerous articles and books on historic architecture on the Indian subcontinent, date this temple to the 1020s CE. The architecture scholar and historian of Indian temples Adam Hardy dates it a bit later, in the 2nd half of the 11th century.

== Architecture ==
The temple is built on a raised platform (jagati). According to the historian Kamath, these features are standard in a typical Later Chalukya temples. The material used, soapstone, is a Chalukyan architectural innovation that became popular in 12th and 13th century Chalukya and Hoysala constructions.

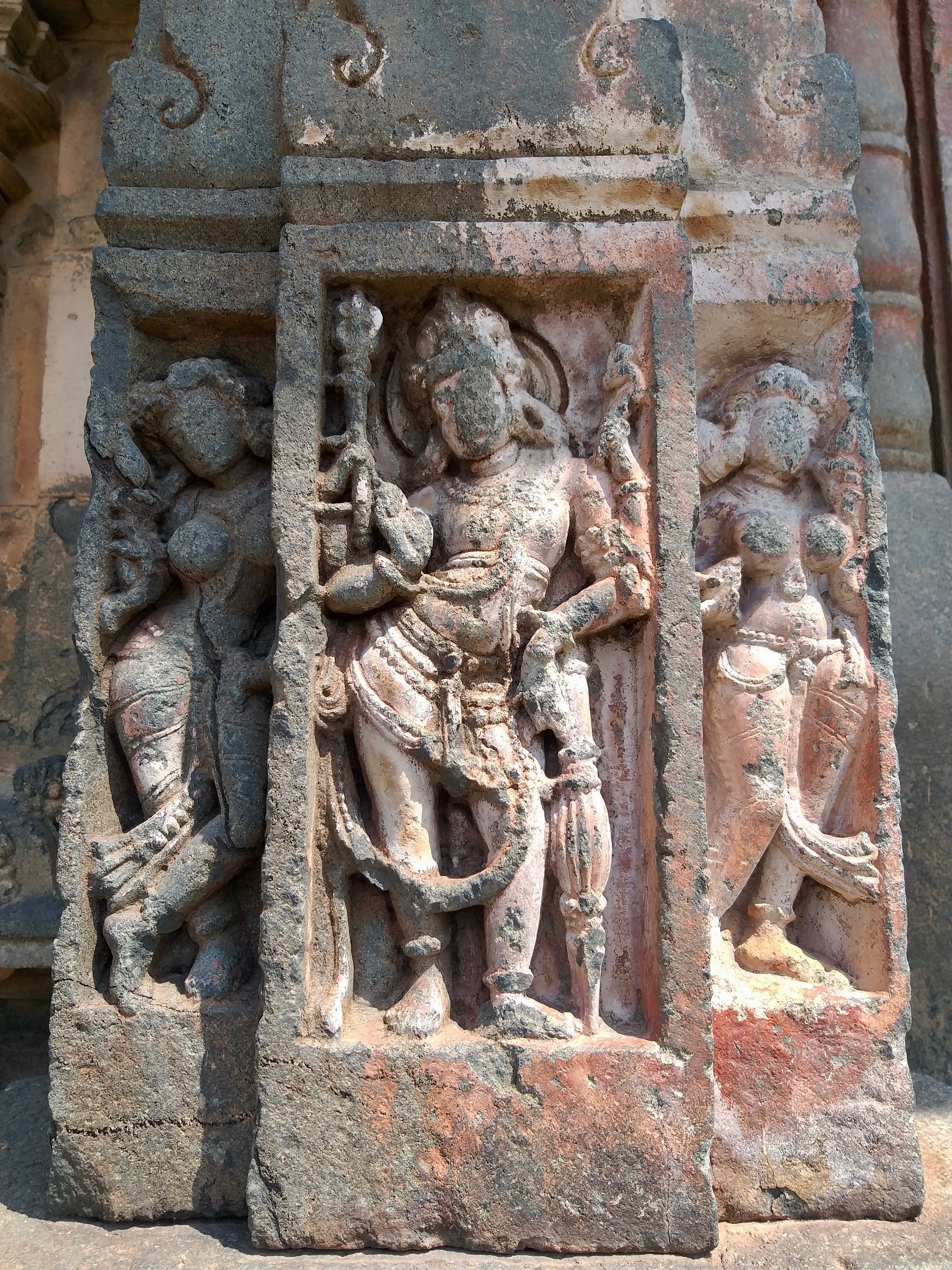
Harihara (half Shiva, half Vishnu) with salabhanjikas

The temple has a pitha styled after the earlier Hindu temples in western Indian (Gujarat and nearby regions). It has a jadyakumbha, a karnali and the gajapitha (a band of standing elephants depicted as holding the pitha). Above this pitha is integrated the southern Indian, more particularly the Karnata-Dravidian style of adhisthana.

The square-plan rangamandapa is supported by pillars, and is more open than the Brahma Jinalaya Jain temple. The pillars are lathe-shaped, show different designs called Srikara, Vardhamana and Indrakanta styles in historic Sanskrit texts on architecture. On the base of one of the pillars is an inscription that says that a commoner lady named Devalabbe of the Hebbana family donated a series of pillars to this temple. It does not include the saka year.

The vimana is a tritala (three storeyed), with karna and bhadra proliferations, along with a khattaka styled after a Shekhari-Nagara architecture. Framed recesses have torana canopies. The Shekhari-Nagara motif repeats around the superstructure, but remarkably integrates the deep trefoils found in eastern parts of India, particularly Kalinga architecture of Kosala region (now central Odisha). The second tala depicts a Nagara-shikhara, while the third tala a Latina-shikhara. Above the third level are phamsana courses and then a north Indian style kalasha. Thus, the entire vimana superstructure is a composition that synthesizes forms and shapes found in the west, central, east and southern parts of the Indian subcontinent.

The gudhamandapa is also of square plan just like the rangamandapa. It has a flight of steps for an entrance, with beautifully sized and carved dvarapalas (defaced, mutilated). Inside, the gudhamandapa has four pillars, more elaborately carved and polished than the pillars in the rangamandapa. The gudhamandapa walls feature a style similar to that found on the vimana but with pratiratha-proliferation set between the pilasters. The sanctum is square and has a Shiva linga.

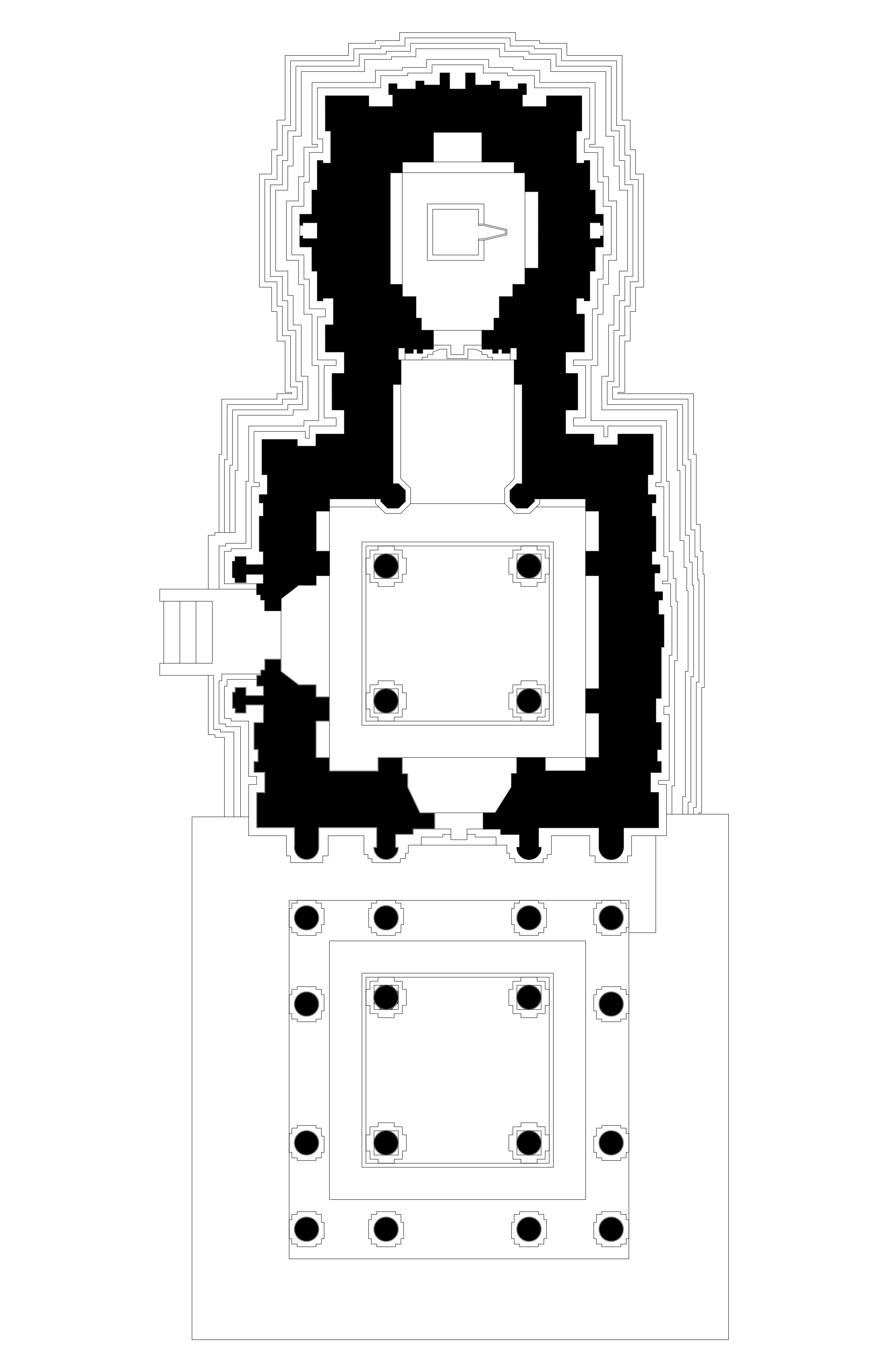
The floor plan of Nannesvara temple, Lakkundi.

=== Temple plan ===
The Nannesvara temple has a large, open pillared ranga-mandapa (devotee or pilgrim's reception hall), a closed gudha-mandapa (assembly hall (Note: This is sometimes called navaranga in Kannada texts)), and a garbhagriya (sanctum). The plan is similar to the bit earlier Brahma Jinalaya Jain temple in Lakkundi and the even earlier Shiva temple in Kukkanur, but the Nannesvara temple shows a series of innovations with grander execution and style than these older versions. Further, the relative proportions of the floor plan shows the architect welcoming ideas and integrating Nagara style from central and western parts of the subcontinent, particularly Madhya Pradesh and Gujarat. This integration is not as extensive as the Kasivisvesvara temple nearby, yet the shilpins successfully execute and integrate a variety of stambha (pillar) styles and decorative elements at the Nannesvara temple with soapstone.

== Gallery ==
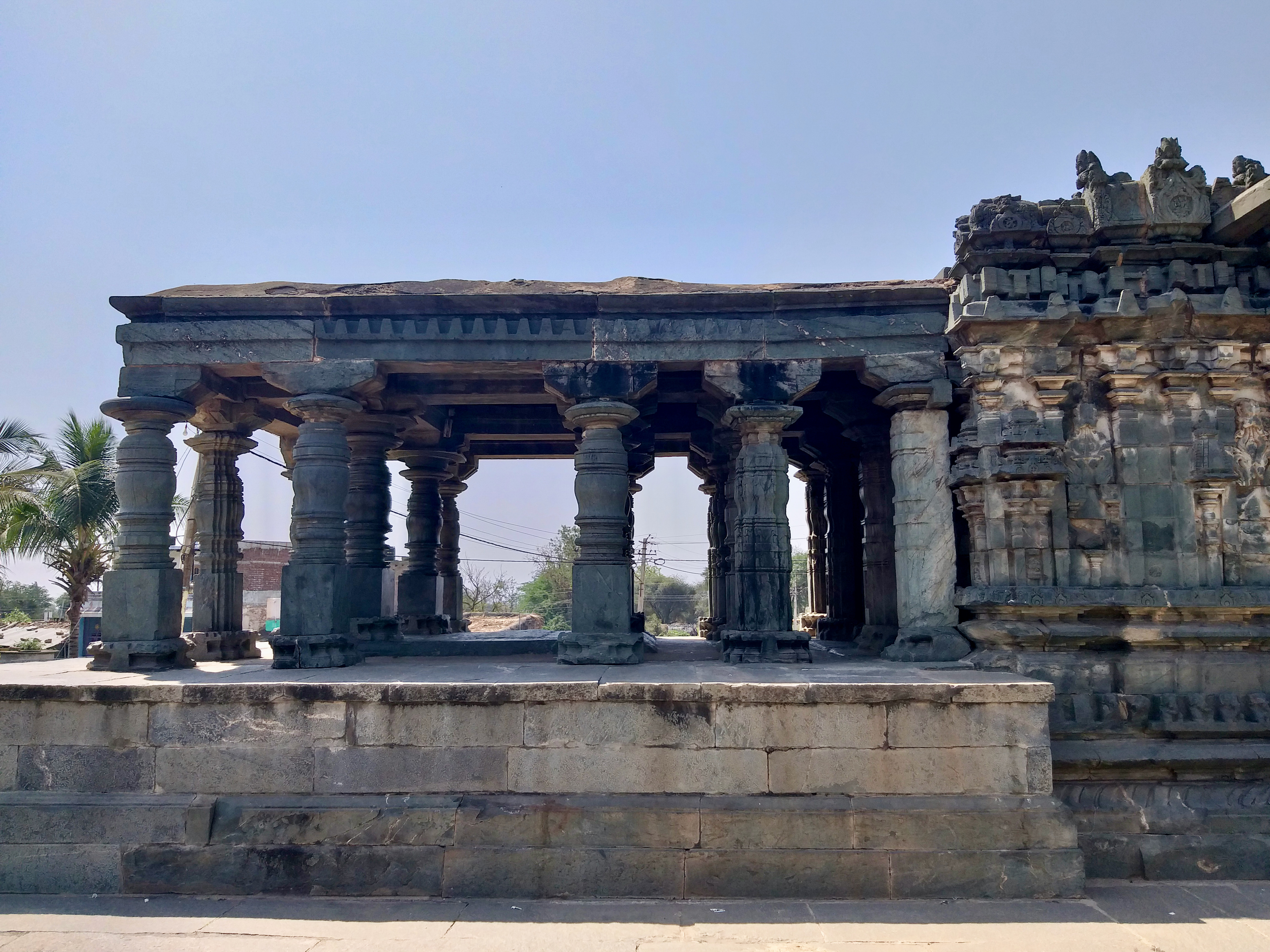
Rangamandapa

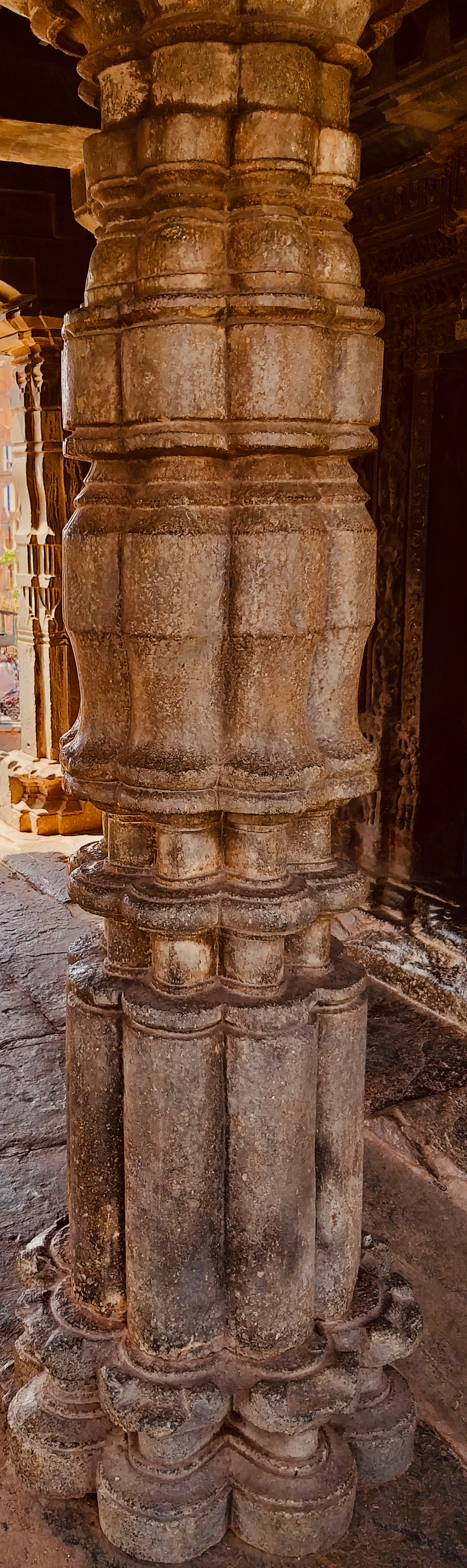
One of the lathe-shaped pillars in the rangamandapa

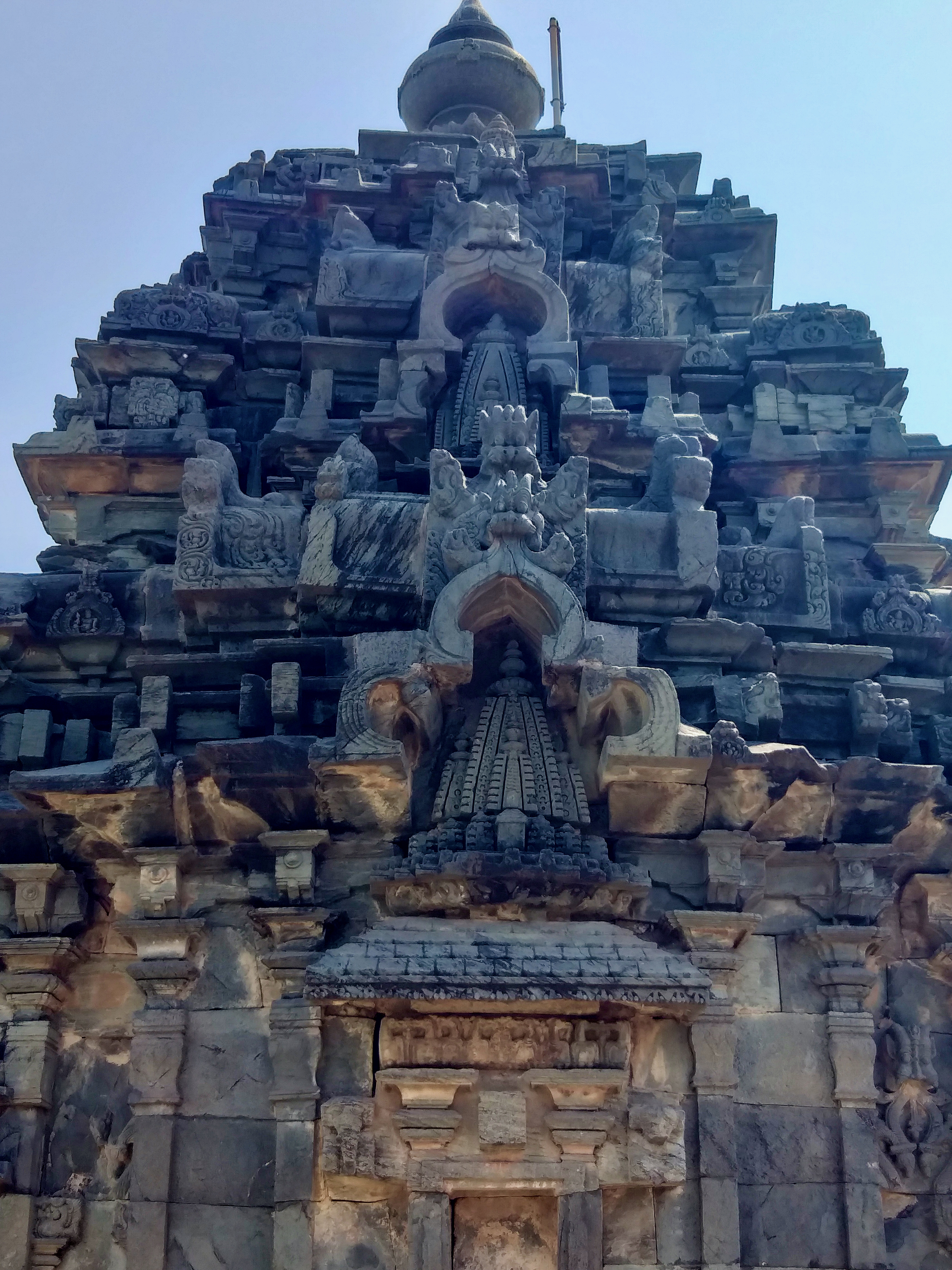
Vimana superstructure with motifs from western, central and eastern India

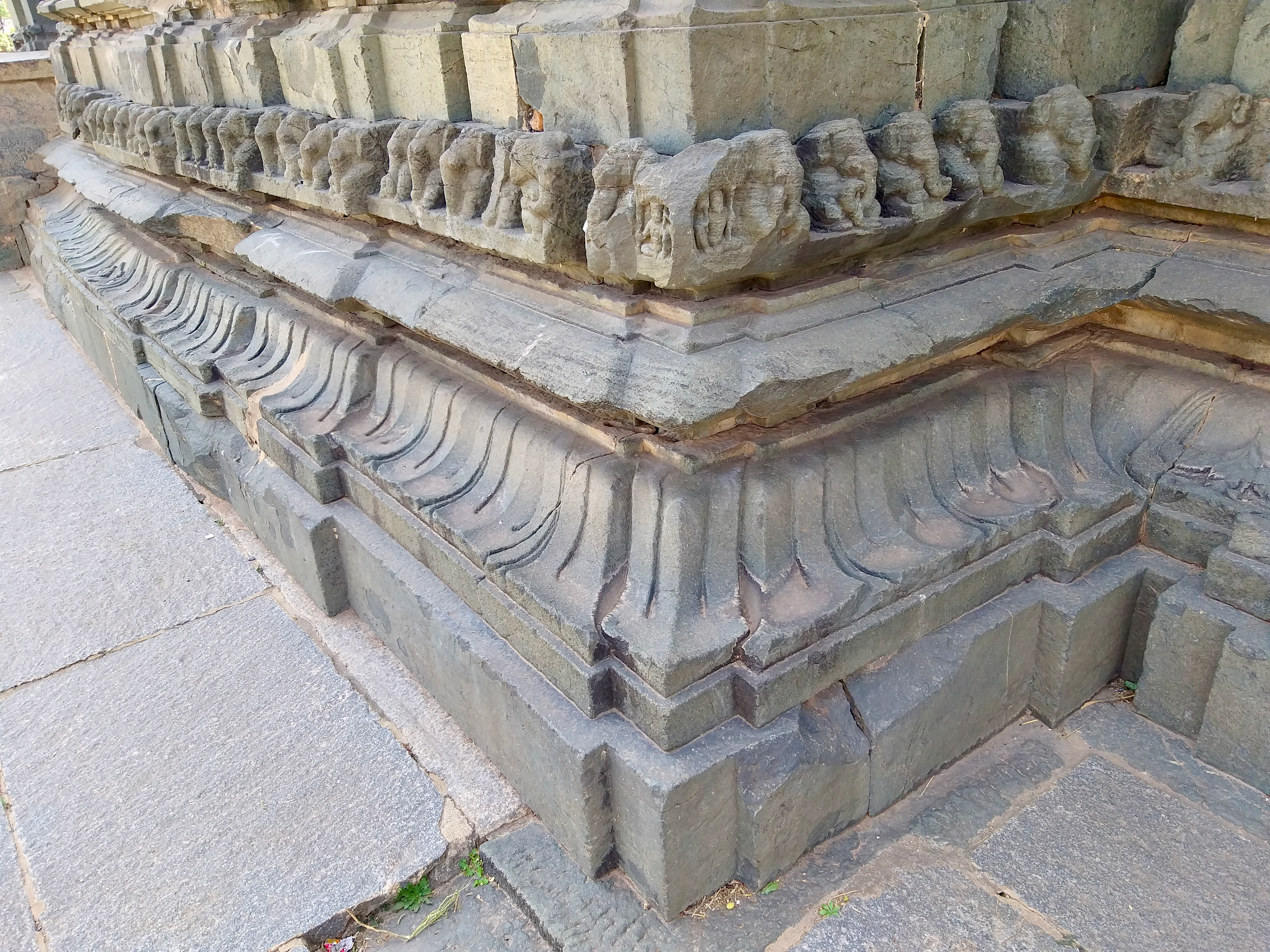
The pitha in North Indian style

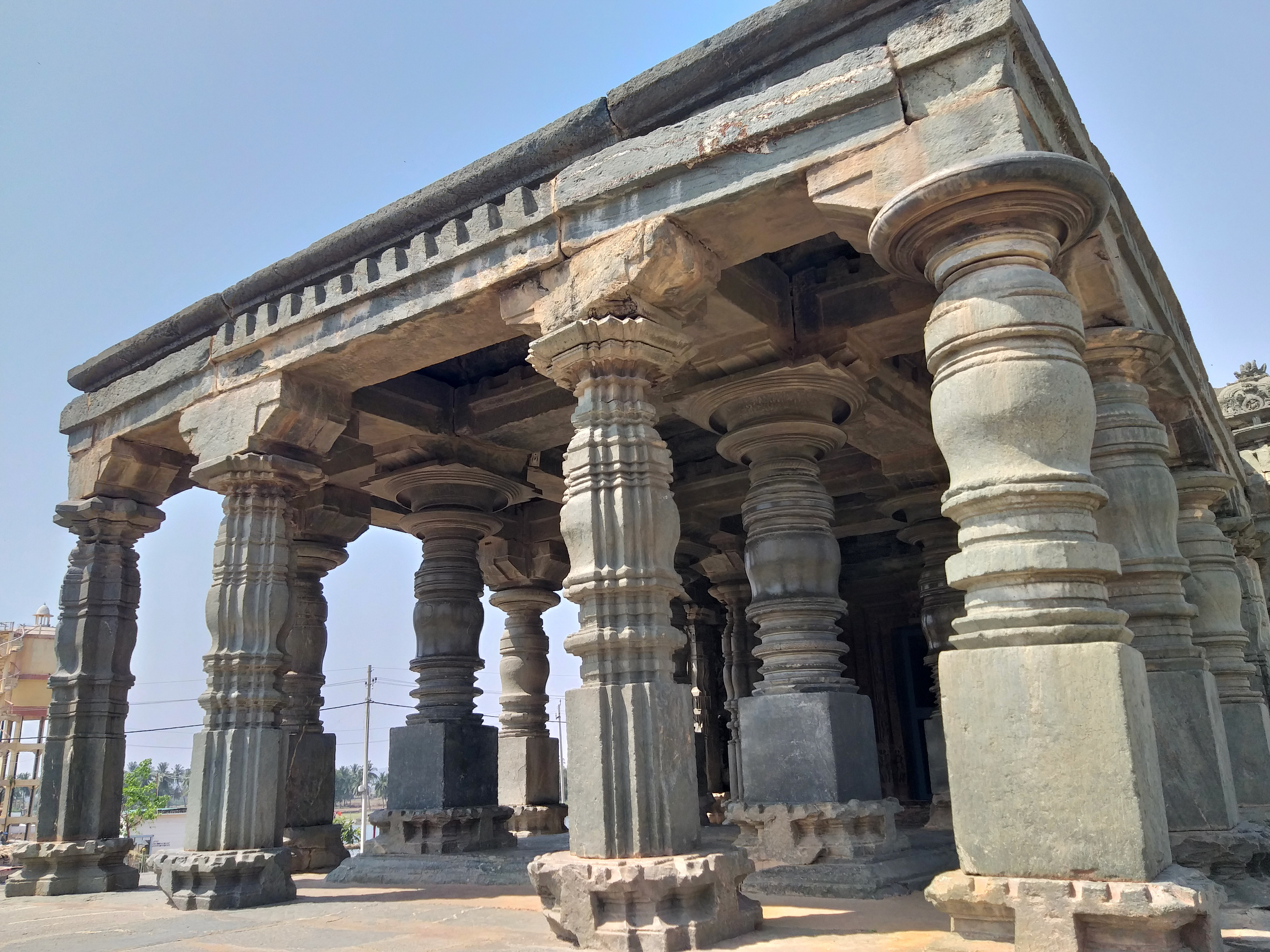
Pillars in South Indian style

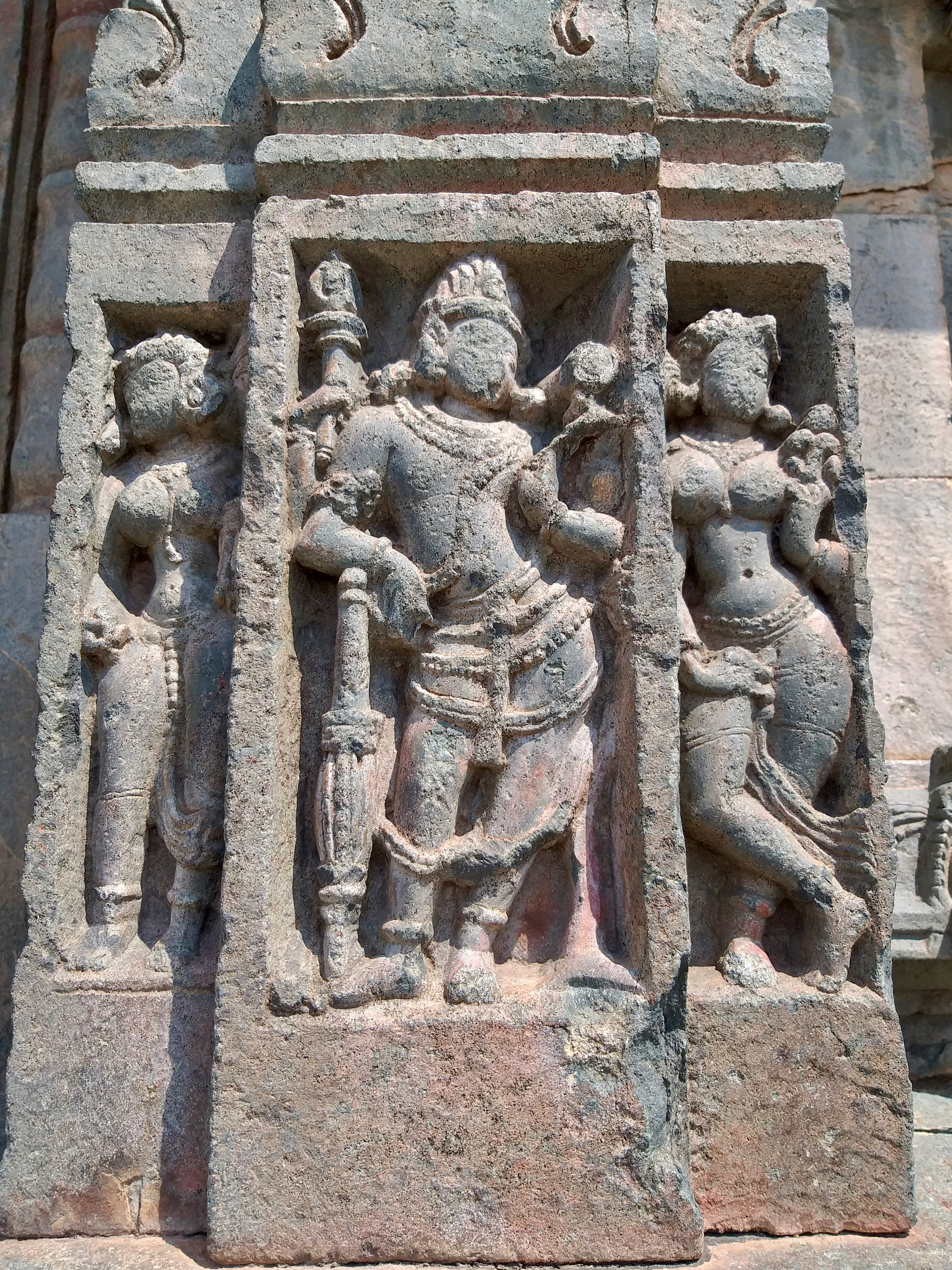
Outer wall reliefs

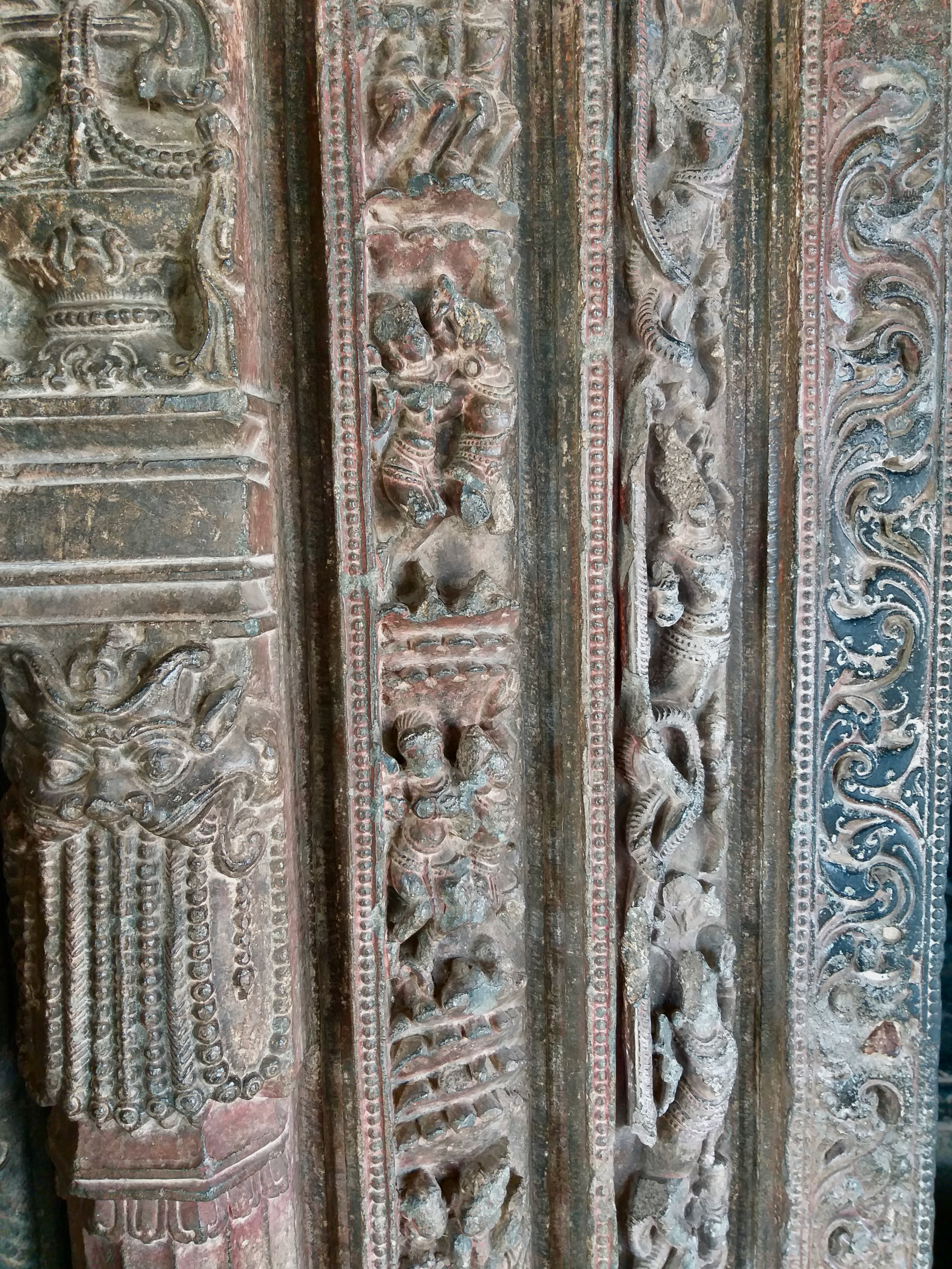
Entrance doorframe carvings (sakhas)

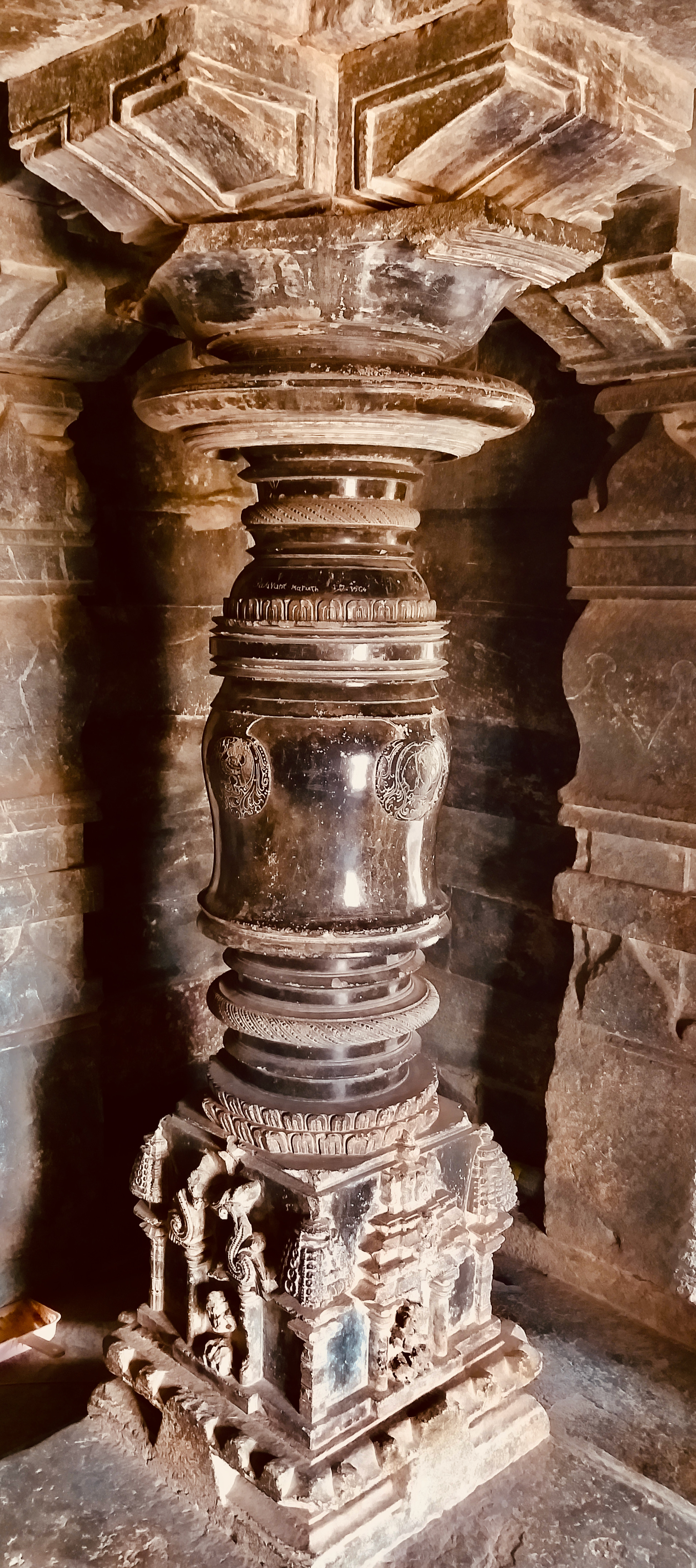
A pillar in the gudhamandapa

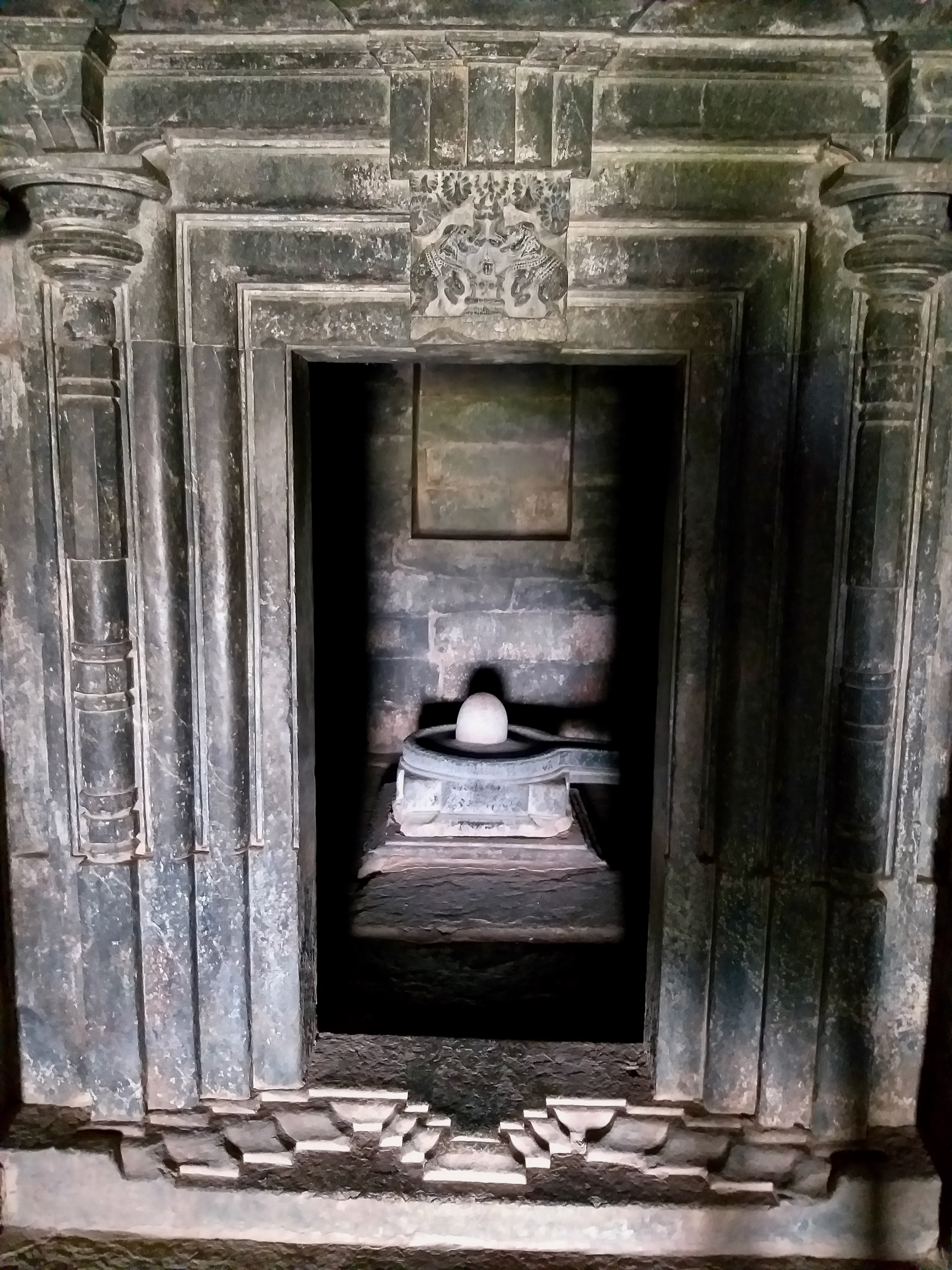
Sanctum with plain doorframe and Gaja-lakshmi at the lalitabimba
