= Nagareshvara Temple, Bankapura =

Nagareshvara Temple
- Hindu temple
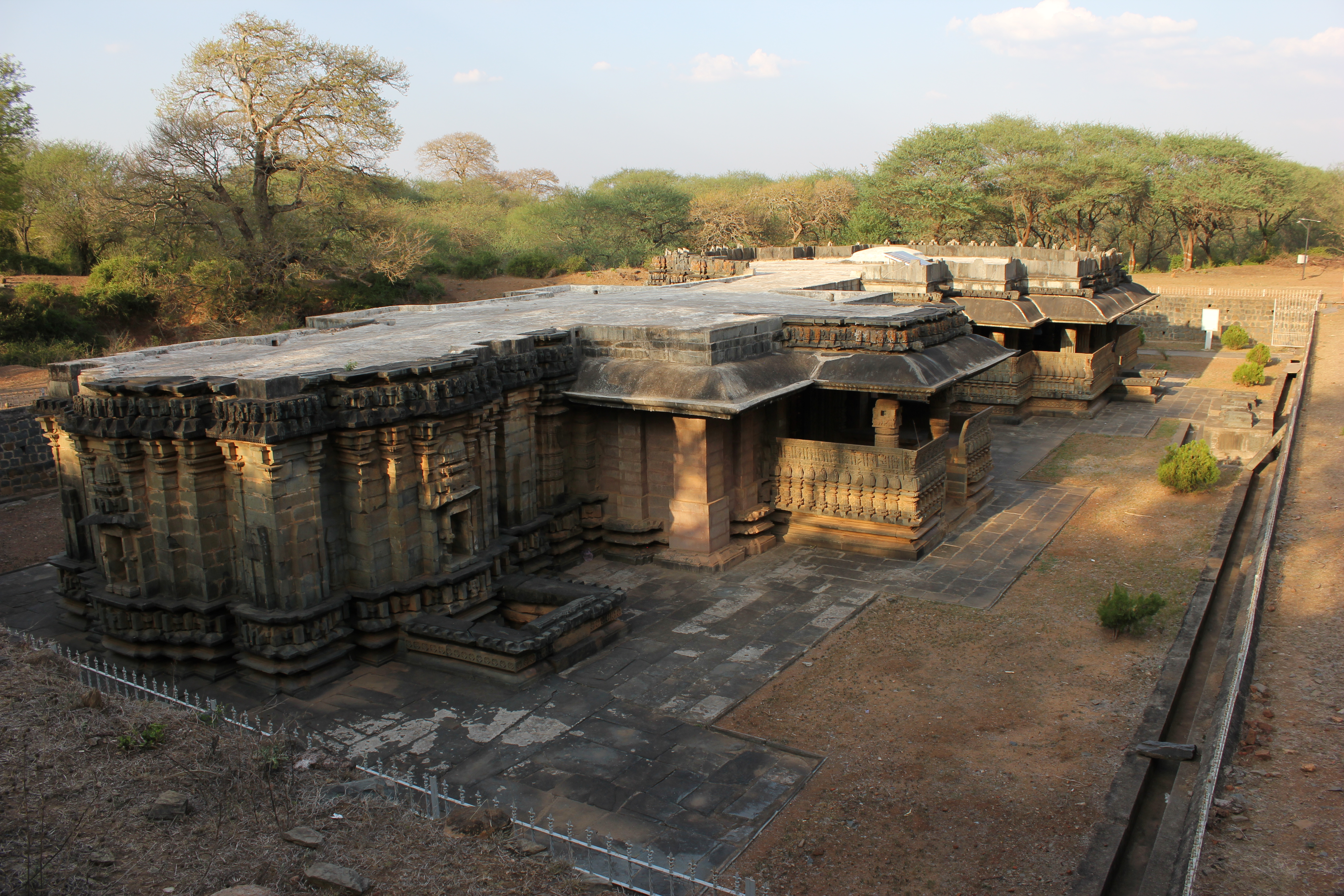
- Large open mantapa in Nagareshvara temple (11th century CE) at Bankapura in Haveri district
- Interactive map of Nagareshvara Temple
- Coordinates: 14.92586°N 75.24970°E
- Country: India
- State: Karnataka
- District: Haveri District

Languages
  - Official: Kannada
- Time zone: UTC+5:30 (IST)
- PIN: 581202

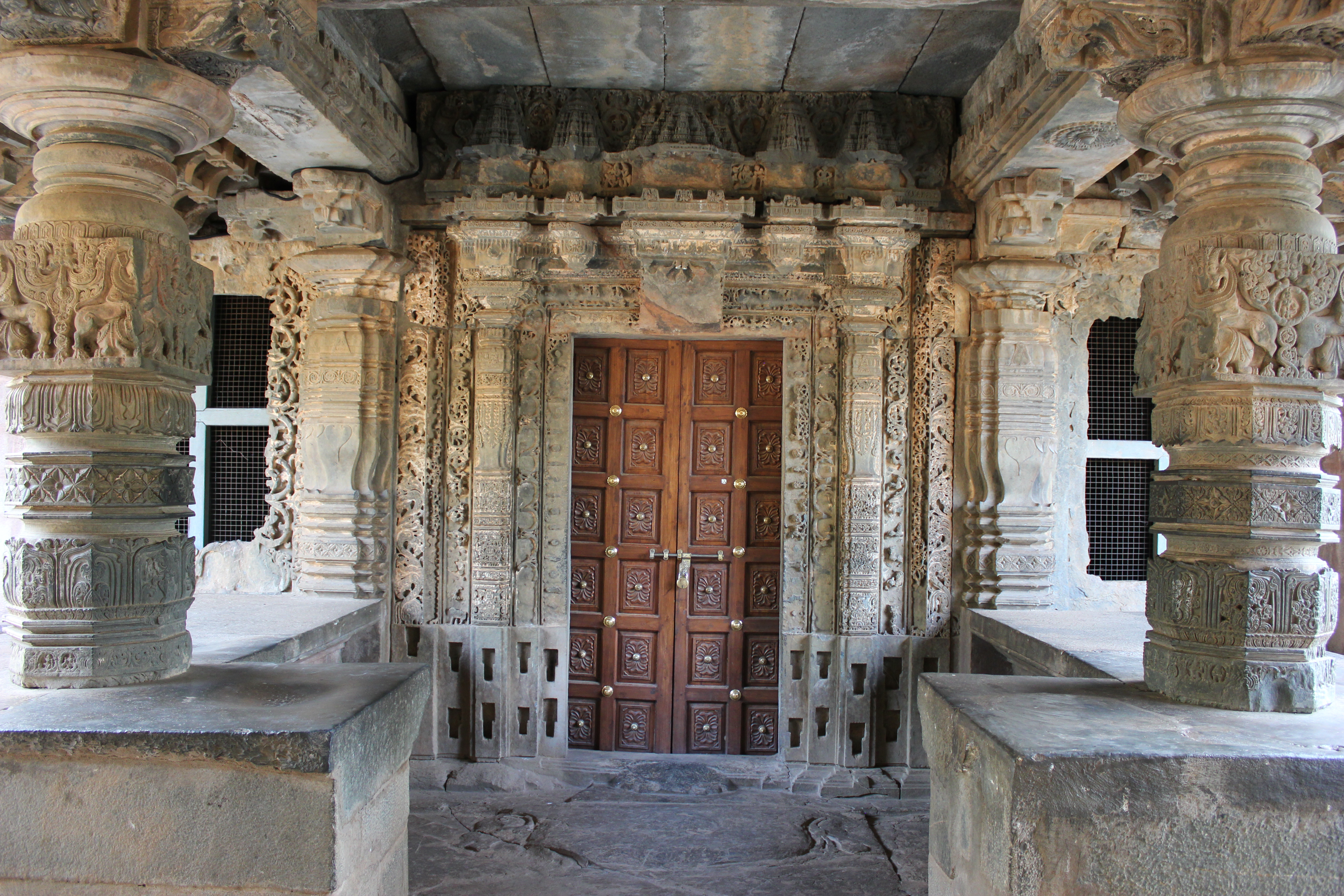
Elaborately decorated doorjamb and lintel of lateral entrance into closed mantapa of the Nagareshvara temple, Bankapura

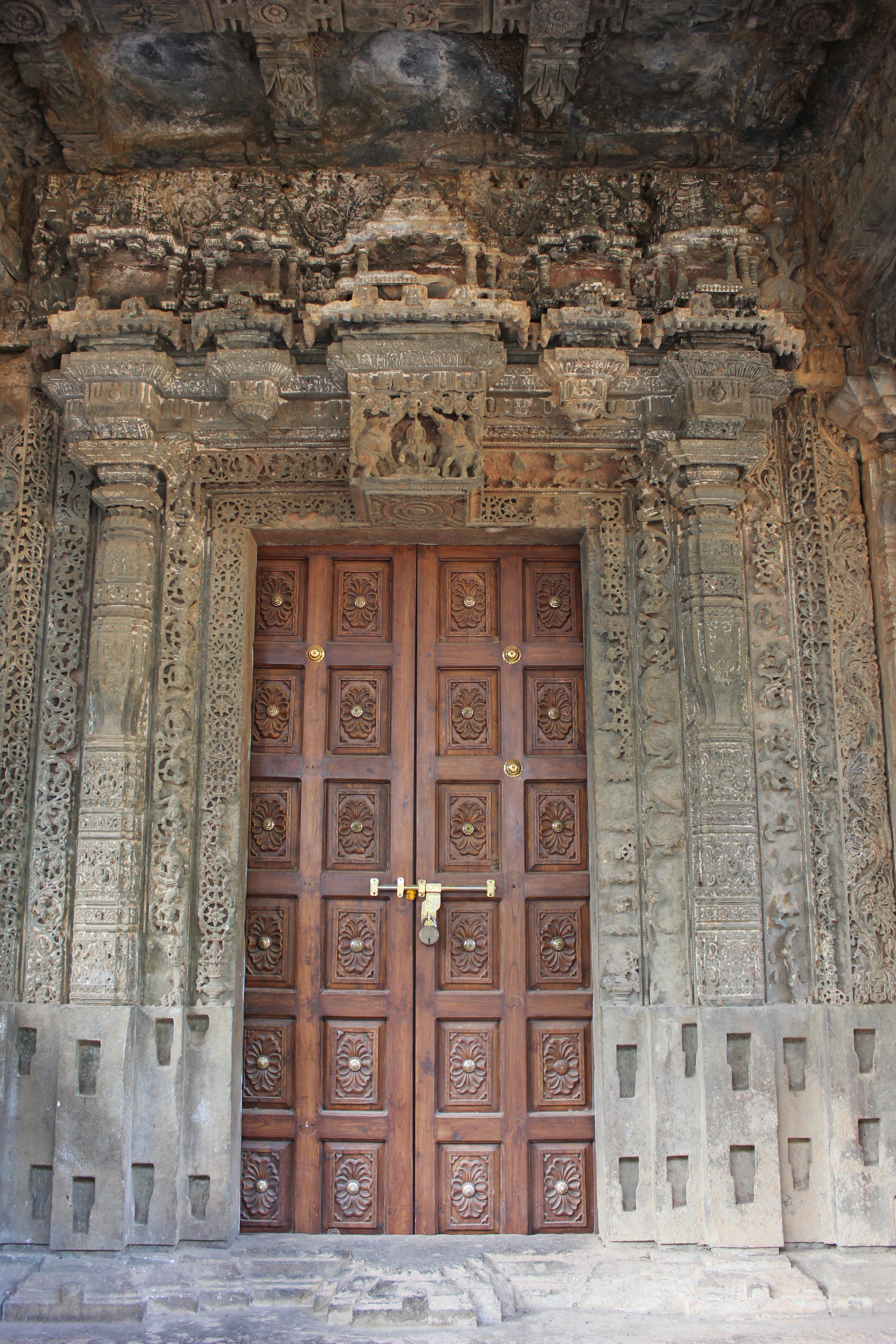
Decorative door jamb and lintel relief at main entrance into closed mantapa of the Nagareshvara temple, Bankapura

The Nagareshvara Temple, (also spelt Nagaresvara or Nagareshwara) also called the Aravattarukmbhada Gudi (lit, "Temple with sixty six columns") is a 12th-century Western Chalaukya (also called Later Chalukya or Kalyani Chalukya) construction. Bankapura is located in the Haveri District of Karnataka state, India. According to the Archaeologist Henry Cousens (1854–1933), during medieval times, the Bankapura fort was considered one of the most important fortifications in the Karnataka region. According to Cousens, the temple suffered much damage when Bankapura fell to the armies of Firoz Shah Bahamani in 1406 CE and later again when it was occupied by the Bijapur Sultan Adil Shah. According to the writings of Farishtah, the Sultan "ordered a superb temple within the fort to be destroyed". However, despite much pillage, the large temple with its majestic "great" hall (mantapa) still retains some of its original beauty. That the temple was built in honor of the Hindu god Shiva comes from two short inscriptions in the temple which begin with a salutation to "Shambu" (another name for the Hindu god Shiva). There are other inscriptions in the temple, two of which are dated 1138 CE and one dated 1091 that record grants to the god "Nagaresvaradeva". The temple is protected as a monument of national importance by the Archaeological Survey of India.

== Temple plan ==
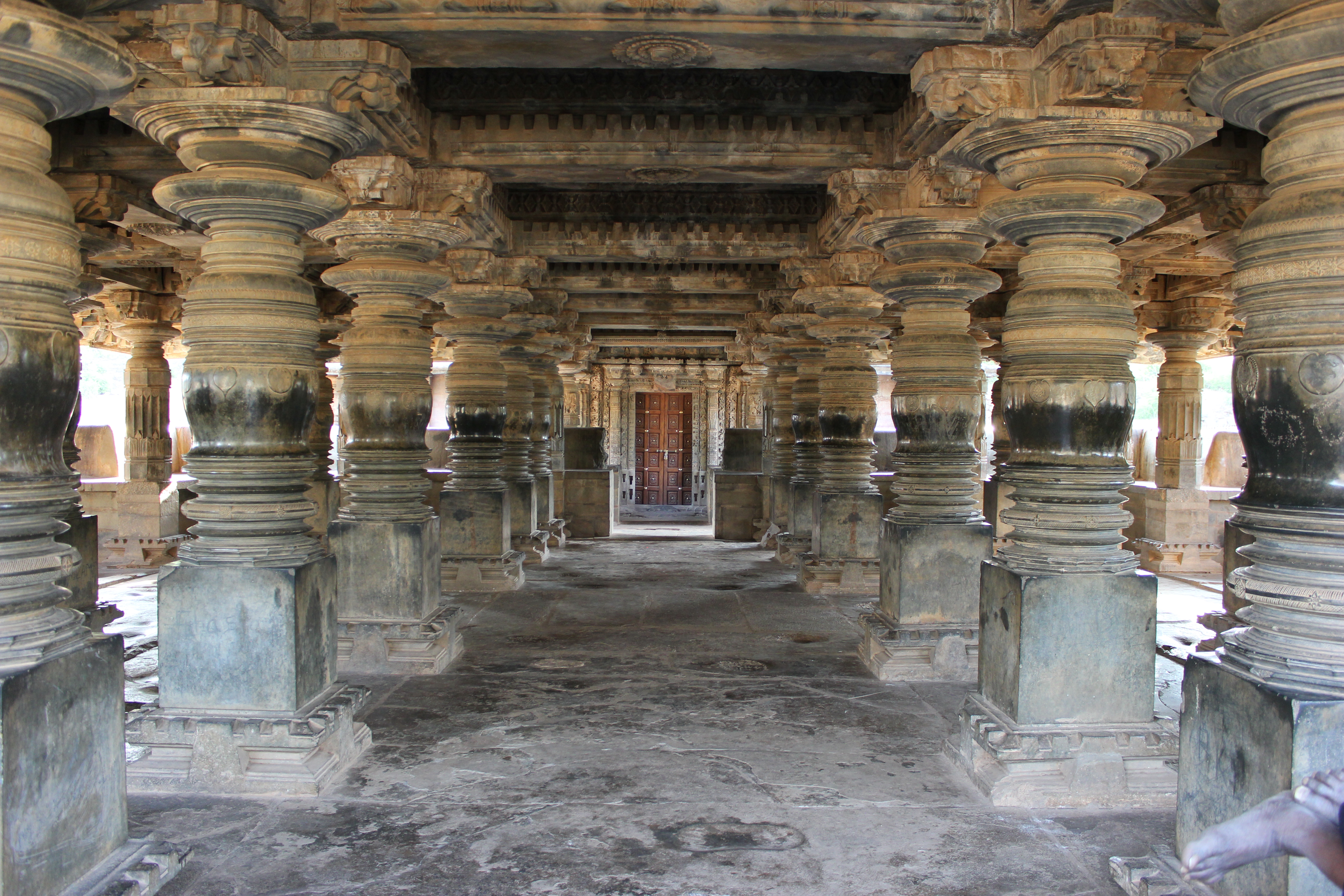
Large open mantapa with lathe turned pillars in the Nagareshvara temple at Bankapura

According to the historian Kamath, Western Chalukya architecture has a pride of place in Indian architectural tradition, and had a significant influence on the later day Hoysala architecture. According to art historian Adam Hardy, this temple is assignable to the 12th century and belongs to the non-mainstream Western Chalukya art. It is constructed with soap stone material and comprises a small shrine (vimana) and a closed hall (mantapa) that connects to a large open hall (Mahamantapa or Navaranga). Like all Western Chalukyan temples, the sanctum is connected to the large hall via a vestibule ("antechamber" or ardhamantapa, which literally means "half hall"). At the end of the large hall, facing the sanctum is an open Nandimantapa (a small open hall with a seated sculpture of Nandi the bull, a companion to the god Shiva). According to the art historian Percy Brown, the Western Chalukya architects provided well rendered external wall surfaces for the shrine and the halls. This they did by spacing out the surface with slender full and half pilasters. On top of the half pilasters are miniature decorative towers (shikhara, called aedicula) with niches underneath.

The highlight of the large hall are the bell shaped lathe turned pillars of dark grey stone (soap stone). So well polished are the pillars that they sparkle with reflected light. According to the Kamath, this is a standard characteristic of Western Chalukya pillar art, later to become popular with the Hoysala architects as well. The main decoration on these pillars are the horizontal rings of moldings. There are other pillars on square bases whose shafts are octagonal or 16-sided with round capitals. The columns that stand between the two halls are extremely ornate and belong to an entirely different workmanship. The ceiling in the large hall between pillars are highly decorative with designs such as rosettes with imaginary beasts (Kirtimukhas) at the four corners. Mention must be made of the central domed ceiling in the large hall which rises in concentric ornamental circles. The doorjamb and lintel decoration is worthy of mention, especially at the entrance to the closed hall from the south. The sanctum is now empty but would have at one time housed a linga, the universal image of the god Shiva. Though this temple has been called a Jain temple, according to Cousens, there is no trace of any images directly related to Jainism. On the contrary, there are numerous sculptures in relief of the Hindu gods such as Shiva, Vishnu, Ganapati, Brahma and Kali.

== Notes ==
- Cousens, Henry (1996) [1926]. The Chalukyan Architecture of Kanarese Districts. New Delhi: Archaeological Survey of India. OCLC 37526233.
- Foekema, Gerard (2003) [2003]. Architecture decorated with architecture: Later medieval temples of Karnataka, 1000–1300 AD. New Delhi: Munshiram Manoharlal Publishers Pvt. Ltd. ISBN 81-215-1089-9.
- Kamath, Suryanath U. (2001) [1980]. A concise history of Karnataka: from pre-historic times to the present. Bangalore: Jupiter books. LCCN 80905179. OCLC 7796041.
- Adam Hardy, Indian Temple Architecture: Form and Transformation: the Karṇāṭa Drāviḍa Tradition, 7th to 13th Centuries, Abhinav, 1995 ISBN 81-7017-312-4.
- "Alphabetical List of Monuments – Karnataka – Dharwad, Dharwad Circle, Karnataka". Archaeological Survey of India, Government of India. Indira Gandhi National Center for the Arts.
