= Banashankari Temple, Amargol =

Hindu temple in Karnataka, India

Banashankari Temple of Amargol is an ancient temple dedicated to Banashankari in Dharwad, Karnataka, India.

== Location ==
Amargol is located in between Dharwad and Hubli, about 9 km from Hubli city centre and adjacent to Navanagar. Banashankari Temple at Amargol is 4 km from Unkal lake and Chandramouleshwara Temple Hubli.

== Banashankari temple at Amargol ==
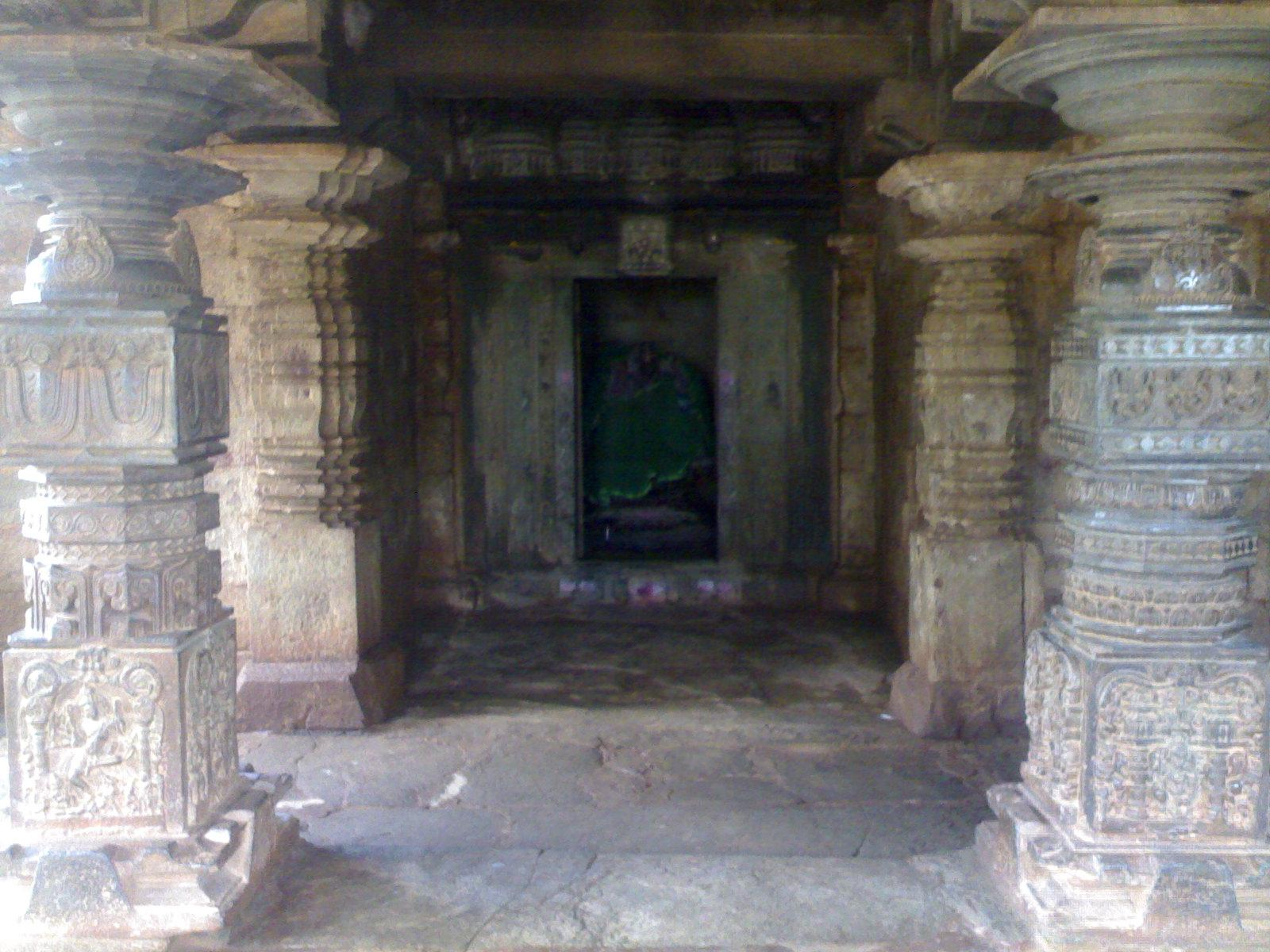
Banashankari Temple Amargol, Karnataka

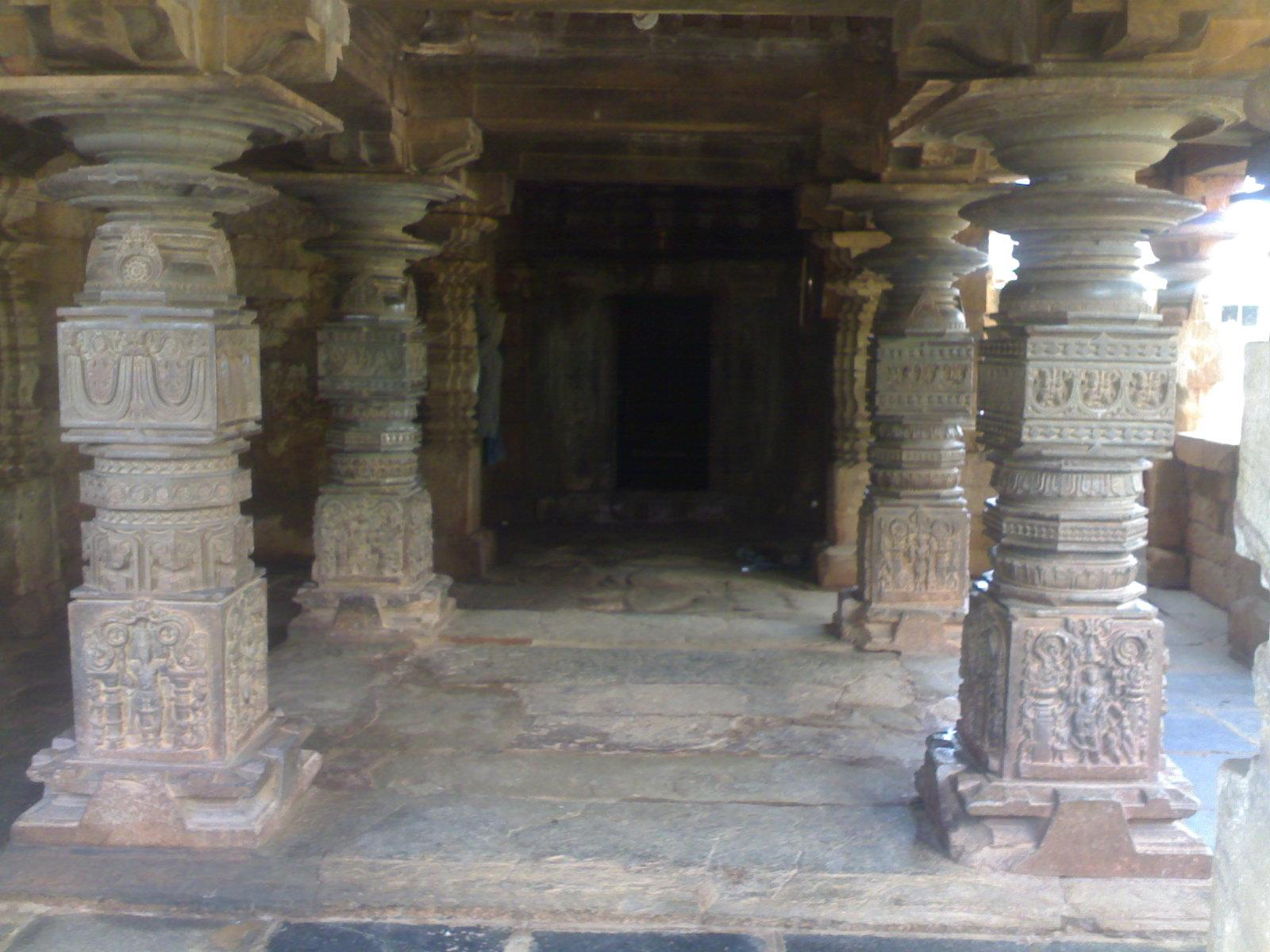
Banashankari Temple Amargol, Karnataka

Near to the Banashankari Temple at Amargol there is a temple of Shankarlinga built by Jakkanacharya.

In the early 13th century, the temples of this period have nagara articulation, built in the stepped diamond and the square plan natural to a nagara superstructure. Notable among temples with a stepped-diamond style are the Ganesha Temple at Hangal, the Banashankari Temple at Amargol (which has one dravida shrine and one nagara shrine), and a small shrine that is a part of the ensemble at the Mahadeva Temple (Itagi).

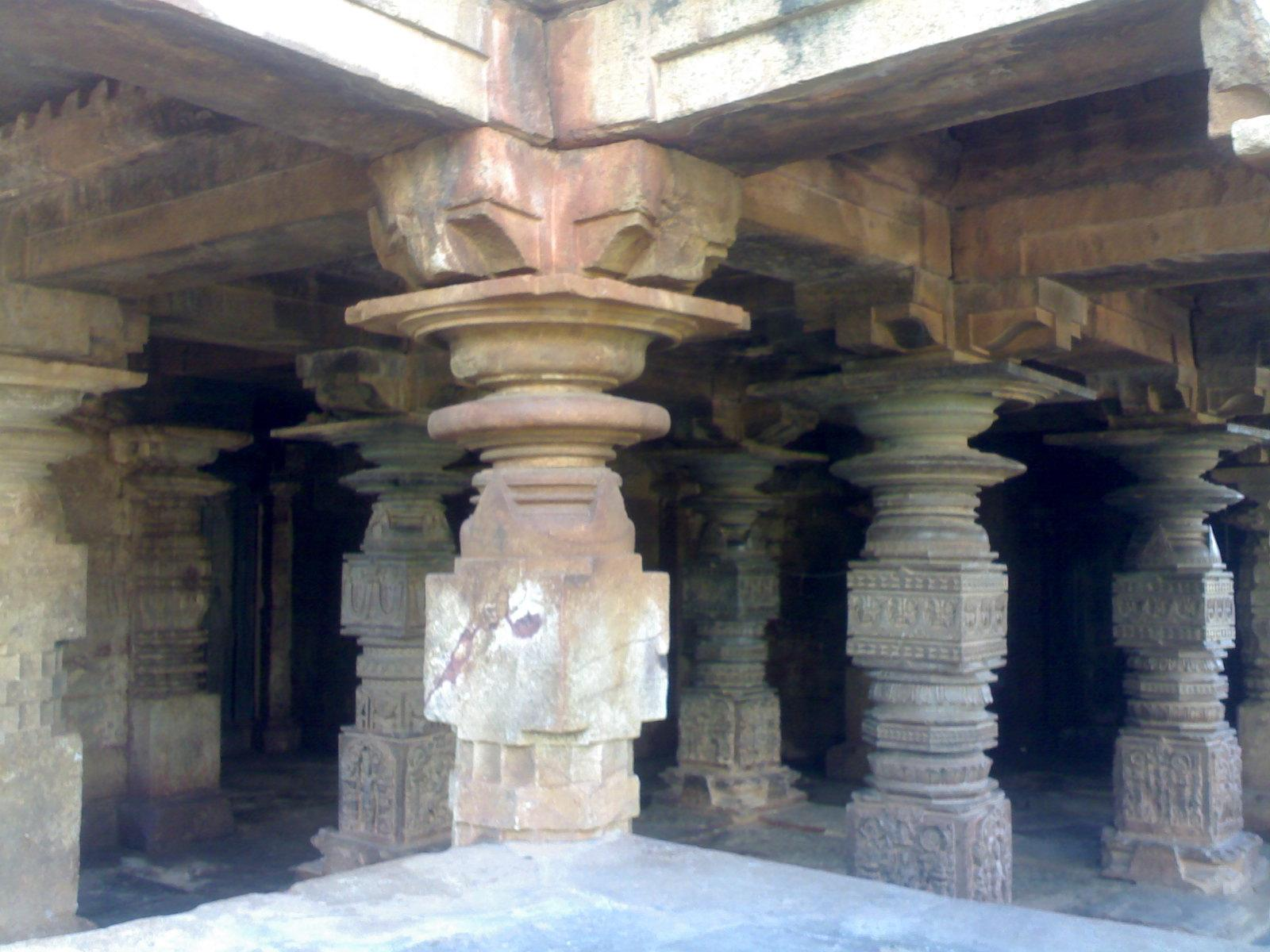
Banashankari Temple Amargol, Karnataka

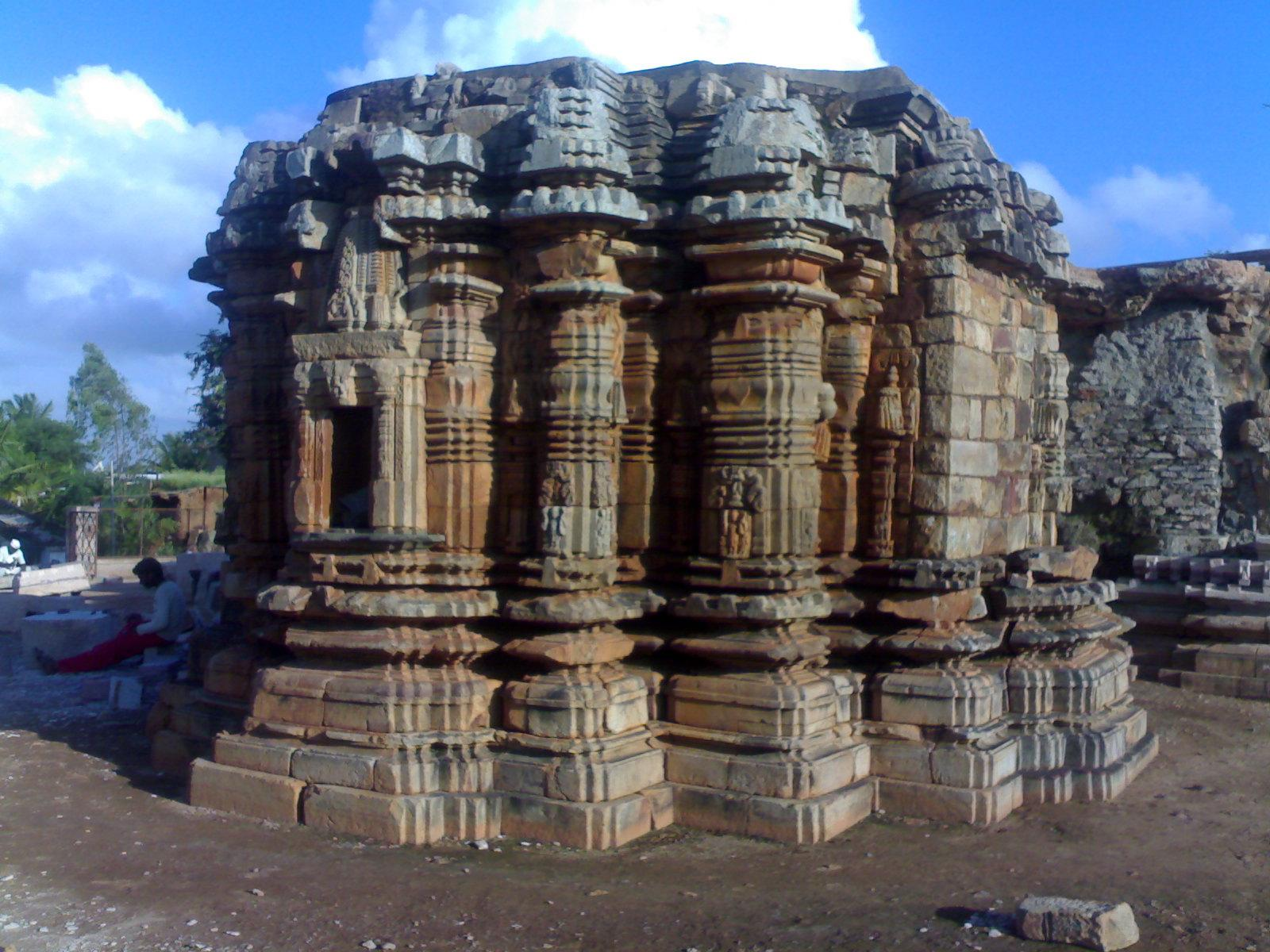
Banashankari Temple Amargol, Karnataka

Conservation and restoration work is in progress. It belongs to the Archaeological Survey of India.

== See also ==
- Western Chalukya architecture
- Chandramouleshwara Temple Hubli
- Kundgol
- Annigeri
- Gadag
- Lakkundi
- North Karnataka
- Tourism in North Karnataka
