= List of Monuments of National Importance in Belgaum district =

The following structures in Belgaum district have been designated as Monuments of National Importance by the Archaeological Survey of India (ASI).

== List of monuments ==
SL. No.	Description	Location	Address	District	Coordinates	Image
N-KA-D1	Western Chalukyan inscription (Saka 1015) in the temple of Banashankari.	Asundi		Belgaum	15°44′48″N 75°01′26″E	Upload Photo
N-KA-D2	Two Ratha inscriptions of Chieftains one of which is dated Saka 1086 in ancient Siva temple	Bailhongal		Belgaum	15°49′06″N 74°51′33″E	Upload Photo
N-KA-D3	Kadamba inscription dated Kali Yuga 4282	Bailur		Belgaum	15°50′59″N 74°29′51″E	Upload Photo
N-KA-D4	Western Chalukyan inscription (Saka 992, Fragmentry) in the Virabhadradev temple	Belavadi		Belgaum	15°43′01″N 74°54′59″E	Upload Photo
N-KA-D5	Old Jaina temple in the corner of the commissariat storryard Kamala Basti	Belgaum Fort		Belgaum	15°51′29″N 74°31′17″E	Old Jaina temple in the corner of the commissariat storryard Kamala Basti More images
N-KA-D6	Old Jain temple outside the Commissariat storeyard.	Belgaum Fort		Belgaum	15°51′30″N 74°31′19″E	Old Jain temple outside the Commissariat storeyard.
N-KA-D7	Remains of an old Hindu temple near the barracks.	Belgaum Fort		Belgaum	15°51′26″N 74°31′33″E	Upload Photo
N-KA-D8	Safa Masjid	Belgaum Fort		Belgaum	15°51′26″N 74°31′27″E	Safa Masjid More images
N-KA-D9	Kannada (15th century AD) inscription in the ancient Isvara temple	Degalavalli		Belgaum	15°34′45″N 74°44′17″E	Upload Photo
N-KA-D10	Temple known as Kamala Narayana Temple Bastigudi with 4 Kadamba inscription, two of which are dated Kali Yuga 4275 (1174 A.D.)	Degaon		Belgaum	15°34′14″N 74°45′09″E	Temple known as Kamala Narayana Temple Bastigudi with 4 Kadamba inscription, two of which are dated Kali Yuga 4275 (1174 A.D.) More images
N-KA-D11	Two Kadamba inscriptions dated Kali Yuga 4270 & 4272 in the temple of Narasimha.	Halasi		Belgaum	15°32′27″N 74°35′22″E	Two Kadamba inscriptions dated Kali Yuga 4270 & 4272 in the temple of Narasimha. More images
N-KA-D12	Ratta tablet dated Saka 1130 and 1178 in Brahmadeva temple	Hannikeri		Belgaum	15°50′41″N 74°42′50″E	Upload Photo
N-KA-D13	Panchalingesvara temple	Hooli		Belgaum	15°47′46″N 75°11′28″E	Panchalingesvara temple More images
N-KA-D14	Inscriptions on two Pillars of Panchalingesvara temple	Hooli		Belgaum	15°47′46″N 75°11′28″E	Inscriptions on two Pillars of Panchalingesvara temple More images
N-KA-D15	Western Chalukya inscription of SomeshvaradevaII (Saka 997) in Shankaradeva temple	Kadrolli		Belgaum	15°41′54″N 74°44′05″E	Upload Photo
N-KA-D16	Ratta inscription (Saka 1127) in ancient Jaina Basti	Kadrolli		Belgaum	16°15′53″N 74°52′11″E	Upload Photo
N-KA-D17	Kadamba inscription (Kali Yuga 4289 ) in Basava temple	Kitturu		Belgaum	15°35′43″N 74°47′30″E	Upload Photo
N-KA-D18	Three groups of Dolmens	Konnur		Belgaum	16°11′27″N 74°45′10″E	Upload Photo
N-KA-D19	Ratta inscription (Saka 1075 ) in Mahalingesvara temple	Konnur		Belgaum	16°12′11″N 74°44′52″E	Upload Photo
N-KA-D20	Ratta inscription (Saka 1009 & 1043) in a Jaina temple	Konnur		Belgaum	16°12′05″N 74°44′59″E	Upload Photo
N-KA-D21	Ruined 11th-century temple	Konnur		Belgaum	16°12′04″N 74°44′50″E	Upload Photo
N-KA-D22	Inscription against the wall of the Panchalingdev temple of the Yadav king Singhana of Devgiri (Saka 1145)	Munavalli		Belgaum	15°50′53″N 75°07′01″E	Upload Photo
N-KA-D23	Inscription in the temple of Udachavva of Khandahara in Krishna (Saka 1174)	Manoli Fort		Belgaum	15°51′16″N 75°07′25″E	Upload Photo
N-KA-D24	Inscription of Sadashivadevaraya of Vijayanagar in Mallikarjuna temple	Murgod		Belgaum	15°53′12″N 74°55′47″E	Upload Photo
N-KA-D25	Ancient Jaina temple in the Jungle	Nandgad		Belgaum	15°33′37″N 74°32′59″E	Upload Photo
N-KA-D26	Inscription dated Saka 1141of Ratta Chieftain Kantavirya IV in ancient Basava temple	Nesargi		Belgaum	15°54′39″N 74°47′17″E	Upload Photo
N-KA-D27	Ratta inscription (Saka 1168, fragmentary) in Narayandev temple	Padli		Belgaum	15°44′41″N 75°08′26″E	Upload Photo
N-KA-D28	Ratta inscription dated Saka 971 & 1010 and a fragment of another dated Saka 970 in the temple of Ankusesvara.	Saundatti		Belgaum	15°45′55″N 75°07′04″E	Upload Photo
N-KA-D29	Two inscriptions in the ancient Jain temple (Saka 797 & 902)	Saundatti		Belgaum	15°46′04″N 75°07′00″E	Upload Photo
N-KA-D30	Jumma Masjid	Sampagaon		Belgaum	15°47′40″N 74°45′28″E	Jumma Masjid
N-KA-D31	Silahara inscriptions (Saka 1078 ) in Basavesvara temple.	Shedbal		Belgaum	16°41′22″N 74°45′35″E	Upload Photo
N-KA-D32	Ratta inscriptier at the water fall near Someshvara temple (Saka 902)	Sogal		Belgaum	15°51′41″N 74°58′24″E	Upload Photo
N-KA-D33	Vijayanagara inscription of Krishnadevara (Saka 1436) in Yellamma temple.	Ugargol		Belgaum	15°45′16″N 75°09′15″E	Upload Photo
N-KA-D34	Jaina temple of Muktesvara	Wakkund		Belgaum	15°45′48″N 74°53′43″E	Jaina temple of Muktesvara More images
N-KA-D35	Kadamba inscription (Saka 1082) in Kalmesvara temple	Golihalli		Belgaum	15°33′21″N 74°39′24″E	Upload Photo
N-KA-D36	Group of temples at Halasi, (Suvarneshvara Temple, Rameshwar Temple, Kalameshvara Temple and Bhu-Varaha Temple)	Khanpur, Halasi		Belgaum	15°38′N 74°31′E	Upload Photo

== See also ==
- List of Monuments of National Importance in Bangalore circle
- List of Monuments of National Importance in Bidar district
- List of Monuments of National Importance in Bijapur district
- List of Monuments of National Importance in Dharwad district
- List of Monuments of National Importance in Gulbarga district
- List of Monuments of National Importance in North Kanara district
- List of Monuments of National Importance in Raichur district
- List of Monuments of National Importance in India for other Monuments of National Importance in India
- List of State Protected Monuments in Karnataka
