= List of Monuments of National Importance in Bagalkot and Bijapur district, Karnataka =

The following structures in Bagalkot district and Bijapur district have been designated as Monuments of National Importance by the Archaeological Survey of India (ASI).

== List of monuments ==
SL. No.	Description	Location	Address	District	Coordinates	Image
N-KA-D41	Ambigergudi (1)	Aihole		Bagalkot	16°01′16″N 75°52′49″E	Ambigergudi (1) More images
N-KA-D42	Ambigergudi (2)	Aihole		Bagalkot	16°01′16″N 75°52′50″E	Ambigergudi (2) More images
N-KA-D43	A temple of Galaganatha group (1)	Aihole		Bagalkot	16°00′37″N 75°52′46″E	A temple of Galaganatha group (1) More images
N-KA-D44	A temple of Galaganatha group (2)	Aihole		Bagalkot	16°00′36″N 75°52′43″E	A temple of Galaganatha group (2) More images
N-KA-D45	A temple of Galaganatha group (3)	Aihole		Bagalkot	16°00′37″N 75°52′45″E	A temple of Galaganatha group (3) More images
N-KA-D46	A temple of Galaganatha group (4)	Aihole		Bagalkot	16°00′36″N 75°52′45″E	A temple of Galaganatha group (4) More images
N-KA-D47	A temple of Galaganatha group (5)	Aihole		Bagalkot	16°00′36″N 75°52′46″E	Upload Photo
N-KA-D48	Badigergudi	Aihole		Bagalkot	16°01′11″N 75°52′51″E	Badigergudi
N-KA-D49	Basavanna	Aihole		Bagalkot	16°01′36″N 75°53′07″E	Basavanna
N-KA-D50	Boyargudi	Aihole		Bagalkot	16°00′55″N 75°52′57″E	Upload Photo
N-KA-D51	Bilegudi	Aihole		Bagalkot	16°01′08″N 75°53′05″E	Upload Photo
N-KA-D52	Chrantimath (Murphadryavargudi)	Aihole		Bagalkot	16°01′08″N 75°52′55″E	Chrantimath (Murphadryavargudi)
N-KA-D53	Chrantimath (Murphadryavargudi)	Aihole		Bagalkot	16°01′07″N 75°52′55″E	Upload Photo
N-KA-D54	Desayargudi	Aihole		Bagalkot	16°00′57″N 75°52′56″E	Upload Photo
N-KA-D55	Dolmens	Aihole		Bagalkot	16°00′49″N 75°53′16″E	Upload Photo
N-KA-D56	Galaganath temple	Aihole		Bagalkot	16°00′36″N 75°52′44″E	Upload Photo
N-KA-D57	Gaudargudi	Aihole		Bagalkot	16°01′11″N 75°52′53″E	Gaudargudi
N-KA-D58	Gaudergudi (1)	Aihole		Bagalkot	16°01′10″N 75°52′53″E	Upload Photo
N-KA-D59	Gaudergudi (2)	Aihole		Bagalkot	16°01′11″N 75°52′50″E	Upload Photo
N-KA-D60	Gauder Ishvargudi	Aihole		Bagalkot	16°01′13″N 75°52′53″E	Upload Photo
N-KA-D61	Great Durga temple	Aihole		Bagalkot	16°01′15″N 75°52′55″E	Great Durga temple
N-KA-D62	Huchimalligudi in Sy. No. 64	Aihole		Bagalkot	16°01′26″N 75°53′01″E	Huchimalligudi in Sy. No. 64
N-KA-D63	Ishvara	Aihole		Bagalkot	16°01′13″N 75°53′01″E	Upload Photo
N-KA-D64	Ishavarlinga (1) Ishavarlinga Complex	Aihole		Bagalkot	16°01′14″N 75°53′01″E	Upload Photo
N-KA-D65	Ishavarlinga (2) Ishavarlinga Complex	Aihole		Bagalkot	16°01′13″N 75°53′01″E	Upload Photo
N-KA-D66	Ishavarlinga (3) Ishavarlinga Complex	Aihole		Bagalkot	16°01′12″N 75°53′01″E	Upload Photo
N-KA-D67	Ishavarlinga (no local name)	Aihole		Bagalkot	16°01′13″N 75°53′01″E	Upload Photo
N-KA-D68	Meguti Jaina temple	Aihole		Bagalkot	16°01′03″N 75°53′03″E	Meguti Jaina temple More images
N-KA-D69	Jyotirlinga temple	Aihole		Bagalkot	16°01′15″N 75°53′00″E	Upload Photo
N-KA-D70	Karegudi	Aihole		Bagalkot	16°01′08″N 75°53′05″E	Upload Photo
N-KA-D71	Kontigudi	Aihole		Bagalkot	16°01′06″N 75°52′53″E	Kontigudi
N-KA-D72	Maddingudi (Basavanna 1)	Aihole		Bagalkot	16°01′06″N 75°52′56″E	Upload Photo
N-KA-D73	Maddingudi (Basavanna 2)	Aihole		Bagalkot	16°01′05″N 75°52′56″E	Upload Photo
N-KA-D74	Yoginarayan temple	Aihole		Bagalkot	16°01′10″N 75°52′59″E	Upload Photo
N-KA-D75	Matha without a shrine (large hall)	Aihole		Bagalkot	16°01′02″N 75°52′53″E	Upload Photo
N-KA-D76	Jaina cave (Mena Basti)	Aihole		Bagalkot	16°00′46″N 75°53′17″E	Jaina cave (Mena Basti) More images
N-KA-D77	No name but forms part of Veniyargudi.	Aihole		Bagalkot	16°01′04″N 75°52′48″E	No name but forms part of Veniyargudi.
N-KA-D78	No name close to Virabhadra temple	Aihole		Bagalkot	16°00′27″N 75°52′44″E	Upload Photo
N-KA-D79	Rachigudi	Aihole		Bagalkot	16°01′08″N 75°52′48″E	Rachigudi
N-KA-D80	Ramalinga temple	Aihole		Bagalkot	16°00′27″N 75°52′44″E	Upload Photo
N-KA-D81	Ravan Phadi (Brahmanical Cave)	Aihole		Bagalkot	16°01′21″N 75°53′04″E	Ravan Phadi (Brahmanical Cave) More images
N-KA-D82	Small temple to southwest of the Great Durga temple	Aihole		Bagalkot	16°01′14″N 75°52′54″E	Upload Photo
N-KA-D83	Temple adjoining Kontigudi on west side & inscription tablet within the temple	Aihole		Bagalkot	16°01′06″N 75°52′53″E	Upload Photo
N-KA-D84	Surangagudi temple adjoining Konti gudi	Aihole		Bagalkot	16°01′05″N 75°52′53″E	Upload Photo
N-KA-D85	Jyotirlinga complex in Sy. No. 66	Aihole		Bagalkot	16°01′14″N 75°53′00″E	Jyotirlinga complex in Sy. No. 66
N-KA-D86	Temple close to Kontigudi Sy. No. 47	Aihole		Bagalkot	16°01′05″N 75°52′54″E	Upload Photo
N-KA-D87	Suryanarayana Temple close to Ladkhan temple	Aihole		Bagalkot	16°01′12″N 75°52′53″E	Suryanarayana Temple close to Ladkhan temple
N-KA-D88	Temple in the fields at north-west corner of the village	Aihole		Bagalkot	16°01′19″N 75°52′49″E	Upload Photo
N-KA-D89	Huchchappayya matha in S.No. 270	Aihole		Bagalkot	16°00′57″N 75°52′48″E	Huchchappayya matha in S.No. 270
N-KA-D90	Ladkhan temple	Aihole		Bagalkot	16°01′12″N 75°52′52″E	Ladkhan temple More images
N-KA-D91	Temple on the north of Durga temple	Aihole		Bagalkot		Upload Photo
N-KA-D92	Siva temple with a large Nandimandapa	Aihole		Bagalkot		Siva temple with a large Nandimandapa
N-KA-D93	Trayambakesvara temple (black marble Isvarlinga)	Aihole		Bagalkot	16°01′06″N 75°52′57″E	Upload Photo
N-KA-D94	Two storeyed Buddhist temple and cave at Meguti hill	Aihole		Bagalkot	16°01′04″N 75°53′03″E	Two storeyed Buddhist temple and cave at Meguti hill
N-KA-D95	Veerabhadra temple	Aihole		Bagalkot	16°00′27″N 75°52′44″E	Upload Photo
N-KA-D96	Veniyargudi (1)	Aihole		Bagalkot	16°01′04″N 75°52′48″E	Upload Photo
N-KA-D97	Veniyargudi (2)	Aihole		Bagalkot	16°01′03″N 75°52′48″E	Upload Photo
N-KA-D98	Veniyargudi (3)	Aihole		Bagalkot	16°01′03″N 75°52′50″E	Upload Photo
N-KA-D99	Veniyargudi	Aihole		Bagalkot	16°01′03″N 75°52′49″E	Upload Photo
N-KA-D100	Mahal Idgah near the Ain Ulmul Kha's tomb	Ainapur		Bijapur	16°50′04″N 75°46′00″E	Upload Photo
N-KA-D101	Old Gate	Amingad		Bagalkot	16°03′41″N 75°57′03″E	Upload Photo
N-KA-D102	Stone bearing Inscriptions	Arshibidi (Gudur)		Bagalkot	15°54′21″N 75°55′54″E	Upload Photo
N-KA-D103	Stone bearing Inscriptions	Arshibidi (Gudur)		Bagalkot	15°54′21″N 75°55′52″E	Upload Photo
N-KA-D104	Stone bearing Inscriptions	Arshibidi (Gudur)		Bagalkot		Upload Photo
N-KA-D105	Bhutanatha group of temples on the east margin of the tank	Badami		Bagalkot	15°55′15″N 75°41′16″E	Bhutanatha group of temples on the east margin of the tank More images
N-KA-D106	Group of temples on the north side of the Lake towards east end	Badami		Bagalkot	15°55′17″N 75°41′13″E	Group of temples on the north side of the Lake towards east end
N-KA-D107	Lakulisha temple behind Bhutanatha group containing a nude seated image in the shrine	Badami		Bagalkot	15°55′15″N 75°41′16″E	Lakulisha temple behind Bhutanatha group containing a nude seated image in the shrine
N-KA-D108	Shaiva,Vaishnava &amp Jaina caves	Badami		Bagalkot	15°55′05″N 75°41′06″E	Shaiva,Vaishnava &amp Jaina caves More images
N-KA-D109	Large seated remains in a natural cavern under the cliff to the south-east of the Bhutanatha temples (Kostharaya cave)	Badami		Bagalkot	15°55′14″N 75°41′17″E	Large seated remains in a natural cavern under the cliff to the south-east of the Bhutanatha temples (Kostharaya cave)
N-KA-D110	Rock shelter Sidila padi cave	Badami		Bagalkot	15°56′37″N 75°42′02″E	Rock shelter Sidila padi cave
N-KA-D111	Relief sculptures on the behind the Bhutanatha group of temples	Badami		Bagalkot	15°55′14″N 75°41′17″E	Relief sculptures on the behind the Bhutanatha group of temples More images
N-KA-D112	Southern fort & the old gun.	Badami		Bagalkot	15°55′23″N 75°40′57″E	Southern fort & the old gun. More images
N-KA-D113	Temple on the knoll under the bastion of the northern fort	Badami		Bagalkot	15°55′25″N 75°40′54″E	Upload Photo
N-KA-D114	Northern fort and temple	Badami		Bagalkot	15°55′20″N 75°41′03″E	Northern fort and temple
N-KA-D115	Hermitage in the natural cavern to the east of the lake	Badami		Bagalkot	15°55′13″N 75°41′18″E	Upload Photo
N-KA-D116	Remains of the ancient Chalukyuan fortification walls including moat. Walls, gates and dam forming the western boundary of Bhutanatha tank	Badami		Bagalkot	15°55′10″N 75°41′04″E	Remains of the ancient Chalukyuan fortification walls including moat. Walls, gates and dam forming the western boundary of Bhutanatha tank
N-KA-D117	Inscription	Belur		Bagalkot	15°50′46″N 75°44′57″E	Upload Photo
N-KA-D118	Kalika Bhavani temple	Bevoor		Bagalkot	16°12′31″N 75°53′17″E	Upload Photo
N-KA-D119	Narayanadeva temple	Bevoor		Bagalkot	16°12′32″N 75°53′17″E	Upload Photo
N-KA-D120	Ramesvara temple	Bevoor		Bagalkot	16°12′30″N 75°53′21″E	Upload Photo
N-KA-D121	Inscriptions	Bhairamatti		Bijapur	16°10′01″N 75°51′31″E	Upload Photo
N-KA-D122	Afzulkhan's wives tomb	Bijapur		Bijapur	16°50′02″N 75°40′34″E	Afzulkhan's wives tomb
N-KA-D123	Afzulkhan's Cenotaph	Bijapur		Bijapur	16°50′40″N 75°40′42″E	Upload Photo
N-KA-D124	Ain-ul-mulk's tomb	Ainapur		Bijapur	16°50′05″N 75°46′06″E	Ain-ul-mulk's tomb
N-KA-D125	Ali I Rouza	Bijapur		Bijapur	16°49′10″N 75°42′50″E	Upload Photo
N-KA-D126	Ali II Rouza (Bara Kaman)	Bijapur		Bijapur	16°49′47″N 75°43′05″E	Ali II Rouza (Bara Kaman) More images
N-KA-D127	Ali-shahid Pir's masjid	Bijapur		Bijapur	16°49′18″N 75°43′23″E	Upload Photo
N-KA-D128	All old guns on ramparts and in trophy	Bijapur		Bijapur	16°49′54″N 75°42′32″E	All old guns on ramparts and in trophy
N-KA-D129	Ambar Khanna Grannery	Bijapur		Bijapur	16°49′22″N 75°43′57″E	Upload Photo
N-KA-D130	Andu Masjid	Bijapur		Bijapur	16°49′20″N 75°43′06″E	Andu Masjid
N-KA-D131	Asar mahal	Bijapur		Bijapur	16°49′34″N 75°43′21″E	Asar mahal More images
N-KA-D132	Batulla Khan's Masjid	Bijapur		Bijapur	16°49′21″N 75°43′33″E	Upload Photo
N-KA-D133	Bukhari Masjid	Bijapur		Bijapur	16°49′46″N 75°43′02″E	Upload Photo
N-KA-D134	Chand Bavdi	Bijapur		Bijapur	16°50′04″N 75°42′40″E	Upload Photo
N-KA-D135	Chota Asar Mosque	Bijapur		Bijapur	16°49′54″N 75°42′50″E	Upload Photo
N-KA-D136	Chinch Didi Masjid	Bijapur		Bijapur	16°49′31″N 75°43′17″E	Upload Photo
N-KA-D137	Dakhni Idgah	Bijapur		Bijapur	16°49′53″N 75°42′43″E	Upload Photo
N-KA-D138	Dam of Ramalinga temple with two outlet (massonry water) channels running at right angles to the north and adjoining gateway at the extreme east end.	Bijapur		Bijapur	16°51′11″N 75°41′17″E	Upload Photo
N-KA-D139	Gagan Mahal	Bijapur		Bijapur	16°49′36″N 75°43′06″E	Gagan Mahal More images
N-KA-D140	Dhaiwadi masjid near Allapur gate	Bijapur		Bijapur	16°49′26″N 75°44′16″E	Upload Photo
N-KA-D141	Gates & walls of the city & citadels	Bijapur		Bijapur	16°49′30″N 75°44′22″E	Gates & walls of the city & citadels
N-KA-D142	Gol Gumbaz	Bijapur		Bijapur	16°49′48″N 75°44′10″E	Gol Gumbaz More images
N-KA-D143	Grave of Aurangazaeb's wife in Navbagh	Bijapur		Bijapur	16°49′25″N 75°42′47″E	Upload Photo
N-KA-D144	Green Stone tomb	Bijapur		Bijapur	16°49′08″N 75°42′50″E	Upload Photo
N-KA-D145	Ghumat Bavdi	Bijapur		Bijapur	16°49′11″N 75°42′41″E	Upload Photo
N-KA-D146	Haji Hasan Saheb's tomb	Bijapur		Bijapur	16°49′23″N 75°44′05″E	Upload Photo
N-KA-D147	Hasan Guljar's tomb with marble tomb stone near Ramalinga tank	Bijapur		Bijapur	16°51′20″N 75°41′26″E	Upload Photo
N-KA-D148	Hyder (Ujpli) Buruj	Bijapur		Bijapur	16°49′57″N 75°42′42″E	Upload Photo
N-KA-D149	Hyder Khan's tomb	Bijapur		Bijapur	16°49′32″N 75°41′42″E	Hyder Khan's tomb
N-KA-D150	Ibrahim I Jami Masjid	Bijapur		Bijapur	16°49′15″N 75°42′57″E	Upload Photo
N-KA-D151	Ikhalas Khan's Mosque	Bijapur		Bijapur	16°49′00″N 75°43′20″E	Upload Photo
N-KA-D152	Jahan Begum's Tomb	Ainapur		Bijapur	16°49′40″N 75°46′30″E	Upload Photo
N-KA-D153	Jalmandir	Bijapur		Bijapur	16°49′32″N 75°43′03″E	Upload Photo
N-KA-D154	Jod Gumbaj	Bijapur		Bijapur	16°49′30″N 75°42′45″E	Jod Gumbaj More images
N-KA-D155	Jumma Masjid	Bijapur		Bijapur	16°49′19″N 75°43′43″E	Jumma Masjid More images
N-KA-D156	Kamarkhi gumbaz	Bijapur		Bijapur	16°49′56″N 75°42′59″E	Upload Photo
N-KA-D157	Ibrahim Rauza	Bijapur		Bijapur	16°49′37″N 75°42′10″E	Ibrahim Rauza More images
N-KA-D158	Karimuddin's Mosque	Bijapur		Bijapur	16°49′27″N 75°43′07″E	Upload Photo
N-KA-D159	Makka Masjid	Bijapur		Bijapur	16°49′31″N 75°43′13″E	Makka Masjid
N-KA-D160	Mehtar Mahal	Bijapur		Bijapur	16°49′22″N 75°43′20″E	Mehtar Mahal
N-KA-D161	Moats of the Fort wall	Bijapur		Bijapur	16°50′24″N 75°43′24″E	Moats of the Fort wall
N-KA-D162	Mosque at Golgumbaz	Bijapur		Bijapur	16°49′49″N 75°44′06″E	Mosque at Golgumbaz More images
N-KA-D163	Mosque No. 21 (behind Chandbavdi)	Bijapur		Bijapur	16°50′05″N 75°42′39″E	Upload Photo
N-KA-D164	Mosque No.213	Bijapur		Bijapur	16°48′38″N 75°42′57″E	Upload Photo
N-KA-D165	Mosque No.366	Bijapur		Bijapur	16°49′37″N 75°46′30″E	Upload Photo
N-KA-D166	Moti dargah	Bijapur		Bijapur	16°49′43″N 75°41′40″E	Upload Photo
N-KA-D167	Mubarak Khan's Mahal	Bijapur		Bijapur	16°49′04″N 75°43′50″E	Upload Photo
N-KA-D168	Mulla Mosque	Bijapur		Bijapur	16°50′15″N 75°42′33″E	Upload Photo
N-KA-D169	Mustafa Khan's Mosque	Bijapur		Bijapur	16°49′29″N 75°43′32″E	Upload Photo
N-KA-D170	Nav Gumbaz	Bijapur		Bijapur	16°49′34″N 75°43′35″E	Nav Gumbaz
N-KA-D171	Nitya Navari tomb & masjid near Moti dargahs	Bijapur		Bijapur	16°49′41″N 75°41′37″E	Upload Photo
N-KA-D172	Old Mosque No. 294	Bijapur		Bijapur	16°49′38″N 75°43′09″E	Upload Photo
N-KA-D173	Ruined gateway with inscriptions slab No. 217	Bijapur		Bijapur	16°49′24″N 75°43′10″E	Upload Photo
N-KA-D174	Sat Mahal (Sat manjil)	Bijapur		Bijapur	16°49′32″N 75°43′03″E	Sat Mahal (Sat manjil)
N-KA-D175	Shah Navaz Khan's tomb	Bijapur		Bijapur	16°50′35″N 75°42′09″E	Upload Photo
N-KA-D176	Sikandar Shah's tomb	Bijapur		Bijapur	16°49′52″N 75°42′53″E	Upload Photo
N-KA-D177	Small pavilion in front of Arash Mahal	Bijapur		Bijapur	16°49′38″N 75°43′17″E	Upload Photo
N-KA-D178	Small tomb No. 47	Bijapur		Bijapur	16°49′10″N 75°42′41″E	Upload Photo
N-KA-D179	Sonheri masjid	Bijapur		Bijapur	16°51′07″N 75°42′00″E	Upload Photo
N-KA-D180	Tomb of Pir Shaik Hamid Khadir	Bijapur		Bijapur	16°49′10″N 75°42′39″E	Upload Photo
N-KA-D181	Tomb No. 22 on the western bank of Chand Bavdi	Bijapur		Bijapur	16°50′04″N 75°42′39″E	Upload Photo
N-KA-D182	Tomb No. 48	Bijapur		Bijapur	16°49′10″N 75°42′40″E	Upload Photo
N-KA-D183	Two different moats of citadel locally known as Arquilla.	Bijapur		Bijapur	16°49′37″N 75°43′04″E	Upload Photo
N-KA-D184	Water pavilions	Bijapur		Bijapur		Upload Photo
N-KA-D185	Water pavilions to the south of the church in the Ark quilla	Bijapur		Bijapur	16°49′34″N 75°43′07″E	Upload Photo
N-KA-D186	Water towers Nos. 61,67,91,114,115,142,147,281,282, 286 and 289	Bijapur		Bijapur	16°49′31″N 75°43′18″E	Upload Photo
N-KA-D187	Well at Ibrahimpur	Bijapur		Bijapur	16°48′13″N 75°43′44″E	Upload Photo
N-KA-D188	Yakub Dabuli's mosque & tomb No.204	Bijapur		Bijapur	16°49′42″N 75°43′18″E	Upload Photo
N-KA-D189	Yusuf's old Jami Masjid	Bijapur		Bijapur	16°49′21″N 75°43′25″E	Upload Photo
N-KA-D190	Zanziri or Malik Jahan Begum's mosque.	Bijapur		Bijapur	16°49′35″N 75°42′57″E	Upload Photo
N-KA-D191	Ancient Hindu temple of Dattatreya.	Chattarki		Bijapur	16°56′09″N 76°04′20″E	Upload Photo
N-KA-D192	Old Temple (partly buried ) to the right side of the main entrance to the modern Banashankari temple	Cholachagudda		Bagalkot	15°53′14″N 75°42′18″E	Old Temple (partly buried ) to the right side of the main entrance to the modern Banashankari temple
N-KA-D193	Old Temple with adjacent ancient structures, gateway to the left side of the entrance to the modern Banashankari temple	Cholachagudda		Bagalkot	15°53′13″N 75°42′18″E	Old Temple with adjacent ancient structures, gateway to the left side of the entrance to the modern Banashankari temple
N-KA-D194	Tank with colonades at Banashankari temple	Cholachagudda		Bagalkot	15°53′14″N 75°42′20″E	Tank with colonades at Banashankari temple
N-KA-D195	Old Jaina temple on top of a hill locally known as Melgudi.	Hallur		Bijapur	16°12′03″N 75°50′52″E	Upload Photo
N-KA-D196	Visvesvara temple with two big Dwarapalas & main entrance to the courtyard.	Hallur		Bijapur	16°11′47″N 75°50′42″E	Upload Photo
N-KA-D197	Inscriptions	Hippangi		Bijapur	16°48′53″N 76°04′00″E	Upload Photo
N-KA-D198	Inscriptions	Katgeri		Bijapur		Upload Photo
N-KA-D199	Masjid	Katijapur		Bijapur	16°45′54″N 75°40′32″E	Upload Photo
N-KA-D200	All four water pavilions	Kumatigi		Bijapur	16°49′01″N 75°53′35″E	Upload Photo
N-KA-D201	Water pavilions in S.No. 318	Kumatigi		Bijapur	16°49′08″N 75°53′27″E	Upload Photo
N-KA-D202	Badi Kaman & related arcades	Mahal bagayat		Bijapur	16°49′23″N 75°43′30″E	Badi Kaman & related arcades
N-KA-D203	Small masjid over rectangular dam to the south of (Afsal Khan's tomb)	Mahal bagayat		Bijapur	16°49′59″N 75°40′34″E	Upload Photo
N-KA-D204	Naganatha temple near Shivayogamandir	Nagaralsamat		Bijapur	15°54′11″N 75°44′20″E	Upload Photo
N-KA-D205	Inscriptions	Nandikesvara		Bijapur	15°55′57″N 75°43′17″E	Upload Photo
N-KA-D206	Inscriptions	Nandwadi		Bijapur	16°01′04″N 76°16′54″E	Upload Photo
N-KA-D207	Fortwalls	Navarasapur		Bijapur	16°50′05″N 75°38′17″E	Upload Photo
N-KA-D208	Sankaralinga temple including inscriptions	Nimbal		Bijapur	17°06′08″N 75°51′22″E	Upload Photo
N-KA-D209	Chandrashekara temple near Sangamesvara temple	Pattadakal		Bagalkot	15°57′00″N 75°48′58″E	Chandrashekara temple near Sangamesvara temple More images
N-KA-D210	Dolmen on the south side of the road leading from the village to Badami about a mile to west	Pattadakal		Bagalkot	15°56′53″N 75°47′58″E	Upload Photo
N-KA-D211	Galaganatha temple	Pattadakal		Bagalkot	15°57′01″N 75°48′58″E	Galaganatha temple More images
N-KA-D212	Virupaksha temple	Pattadakal		Bagalkot	15°56′57″N 75°48′58″E	Virupaksha temple More images
N-KA-D213	Jain Narayan temple	Pattadkal		Bagalkot	15°56′59″N 75°48′29″E	Jain Narayan temple More images
N-KA-D214	Jambulinga temple	Pattadakal		Bagalkot	15°57′01″N 75°48′58″E	Jambulinga temple More images
N-KA-D215	Kadasiddesvara temple	Pattadakal		Bagalkot	15°57′02″N 75°48′58″E	Kadasiddesvara temple More images
N-KA-D216	Kasi visvesvara Temple	Pattadakal		Bagalkot	15°56′59″N 75°48′57″E	Kasi visvesvara Temple More images
N-KA-D217	Monolithic stone pillar bearing inscriptions	Pattadakal		Bagalkot	15°57′00″N 75°48′59″E	Monolithic stone pillar bearing inscriptions More images
N-KA-D218	Mallikarjuna temple	Pattadakal		Bagalkot	15°56′58″N 75°48′57″E	Mallikarjuna temple More images
N-KA-D219	Papanatha temple	Pattadakal		Bagalkot	15°56′51″N 75°48′59″E	Papanatha temple More images
N-KA-D220	Sangamesvara temple	Pattadakal		Bagalkot	15°57′00″N 75°48′58″E	Sangamesvara temple More images
N-KA-D221	Sri Ramadeva temple	Talikote		Bijapur	16°28′20″N 76°18′26″E	Upload Photo
N-KA-D222	Aqueduct running from Bhat Bavdi southwest of Tervi village to Taj Bavdi, Bijapur	Torvi		Bijapur	16°49′31″N 75°42′35″E	Aqueduct running from Bhat Bavdi southwest of Tervi village to Taj Bavdi, Bijapur More images
N-KA-D223-a	Sangeeth Mahal	Torvi		Bijapur	16°49′39″N 75°39′29″E	Sangeeth Mahal More images
N-KA-D223-b	Nari Mahal	Torvi		Bijapur	16°49′36″N 75°39′27″E	Upload Photo

== See also ==
- List of Monuments of National Importance in Bangalore circle
- List of Monuments of National Importance in Belgaum district
- List of Monuments of National Importance in Bidar district
- List of Monuments of National Importance in Dharwad district
- List of Monuments of National Importance in Gulbarga district
- List of Monuments of National Importance in North Kanara district
- List of Monuments of National Importance in Raichur district
- List of Monuments of National Importance in India for other Monuments of National Importance in India
- List of State Protected Monuments in Karnataka
