= Makkah Masjid =

Makkah Masjid is the name of various Muslim places of worship. Makkah means the holy city of Mecca and Masjid means a place of worship, otherwise known as a Mosque. Institutions with this name include:

- Makkah Masjid, Chennai
- Makkah Masjid, Bijapur
- Makkah Masjid, Hyderabad
