= Virkar =

Indian surname

Virkar is an Indian surname.

== People ==
- Aakanksha Virkar-Yates, Senior Lecturer in Literature at the University of Brighton
- Ajay Virkar, American chemical engineer
- Anil Virkar, American materials scientist
- Katayun Virkar (1918–2011), Indian medical researcher
- Krishnaji Bhaskar Virkar, Indian educator, founder of Abhinava Vidyalaya, Pune
- Narayan Vinayak Virkar (born 1890), Indian photographer and photojournalist
- Shefali Virkar, Assistant Professor, Institute for Public Management and Governance, Vienna University of Economics and Business (WU Wien)
- Prakash Virkar, Indian chemical engineer

== Other uses ==
- Inspector Virkar, main character in Piyush Jha's series of novels about a Mumbai policeman
- Chakravyuh – An Inspector Virkar Crime Thriller, web series based on Piyush Jha's novels

== See also ==
- Deshastha Brahmin surnames
