= Andu Masjid =

Mosque in Bijapur, Karnataka, India

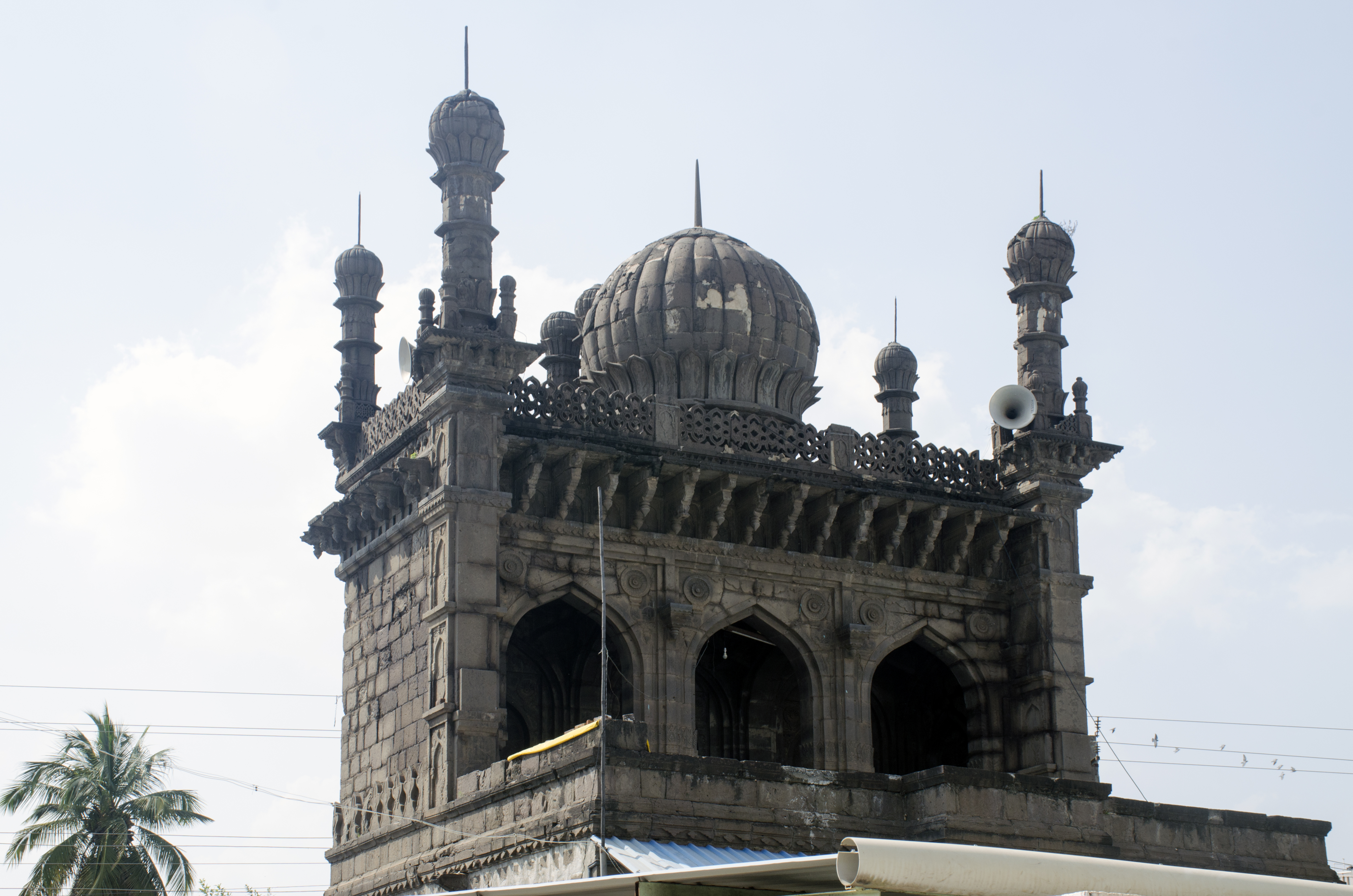
- The mosque, in 1866, by William Henry Pigou

- Location of the mosque in Karnataka

Religion
- Affiliation: Islam
- Ecclesiastical or organizational status: Mosque
- Status: Active

Location
- Location: Bijapur, Karnataka
- Country: India
- Interactive map of Andu Masjid
- Administration: Archaeological Survey of India
- Coordinates: 16°49′20″N 75°43′06″E

Architecture
- Type: Mosque architecture
- Style: Indo-Islamic
- Founder: I‘tibar Khan
- Completed: 1017 AH (1608/1609 CE)

Specifications
- Dome: One
- Minaret: Four
- Materials: Dressed stone

Monument of National Importance
- Official name: Andu Masjid
- Reference no.: N-KA-D130

The Andu Masjid, also known as Anda Masjid, is a mosque located in Bijapur, in the state of Karnataka, India. The mosque is a Monument of National Importance, administered by the Archaeological Survey of India.

== Architecture ==
An inscription carved at the entrance of the mosque notes that it was commissioned by I‘tibar Khan in 1017 AH (1608/1609 CE). Khan was a nobleman who lived during the reign of Ibrahim Adil Shah II.

Henry Cousens posits that it was built as a women's mosque. The absence of a pulpit within the prayer-hall points to this conclusion, since no man would be allowed to enter the mosque and deliver a sermon, due to purdah restrictions. Other elements supporting this theory include a parapet around the terrace of the building, which allows its occupants a view of the city without being seen themselves. However, as of 2016, the mosque has banned the entry of women. Its ground floor serves as a madrasa, while the upper floor serves as a prayer-hall for men.

The building has two stories, with the mosque on the first floor and a hall on the ground floor, which might have served as a caravanserai. It is built out of dressed stone masonry. The first floor is ornately decorated, while the ground floor is plain.

The mosque is situated on the western side of the first floor, and its façade has three arched entrances of equal size, opening out into a terrace. Two staircases provide access to the outer corners of the terrace, and a low parapet runs around it. The prayer-hall measures about 6 metres (20 ft) square. Its western wall contains a large mihrab (prayer-niche), flanked by two smaller niches. There is no minbar (pulpit) within the mosque.

A ribbed dome surmounts the roof, resting upon an arcaded drum with sixteen sides. Four minarets rise above a projecting buttress at the rear of the dome, which aligns with the prayer-niche of the mosque below. Four more minarets are provided, one at each corner of the building. The main dome is melon-shaped, as are small domes crowning each of the minarets.

== See also ==
- Islam in India
- List of mosques in India
- List of Monuments of National Importance in Bijapur district, Karnataka
