= Deshastha Brahmin surnames =

Deshastha Brahmin surnames are derived by adding the suffix kar or e to the village from which the family originally hailed. For example, Akhegaonkar came from the village Akhegaon, Bidkar came from the town of Bid, Jugade came from the village Jugad, Mulik came from district Muluk and some links say Mulikwadi from Konkan area, Yadwadkar came from Yadwad Nagpurkar comes from the city Nagpur, Virkar came from the village Vira or Veer, the Marathi poet V. V. Shirwadkar, colloquially known as Kusumagraj, came from the town of Shirwad, Dharwadkar from the town of Dharwad, and Bijapurkar from the town of Bijapur in Karnataka.

Deshasthas historically resident in Southern India also use directly the town name where they originally hail from without any suffix. For examples Diwan Tanjore Madhava Rao came from the town of Thanjavur, Diwan Kanchi Krishnaswamy Rao or Historian Conjeevaram Hayavadana Rao from the town of Kanchipuram also known as Conjeevaram in Tamil Nadu, Civil servant Gurunath Venkatesh Bewoor from the village Bewoor, poet V. K. Gokak from the city of Gokak, Mysore Sadashiva Rao from the city of Mysore in Karnataka, artist N. S. Bendre from the village of Bendri in Madhya Pradesh.

Some Deshastha Brahmin surnames are also derived from their gotra name of rishi For example, prominent Marathi writer, a poet Pralhad Keshav Atre popularly known as Acharya Atre surname "Atre" came from the gotra Atri.

Deshasthas also use the occupation or profession they did as their surnames such as Joshi means astrologer, Vaidya means doctor. Deshasthas who were manufacturers of Salt and who did trading of salt in the state of Karnataka adopted Uppu or Vuppu as their surnames which means Salt in Kannada.

Deshastha Brahmins also use the surnames, which their ancestors got as titles or positions held like Kulkarni, Deshpande, Deshmukh, Rajguru, Nirkhee, Fadnavis, Gadkari, Hatkar (हातकर) and Desai denote their professions. However, some of these names are also common to some other Marathi communities. For example, Deshpande and Kulkarni surnames are also found in the CKP caste. Deshmukh is also found in the Maratha, CKP and Chitpawan and other castes. Patil is also found in the Maratha and several other castes. Kulkarni means revenue collector and Joshi means astrologer. Ghaisas, which means brave and is a rank during Rashtrakuta dynasty and is used as a surname by Deshastha Brahmins, Chitpavan Brahmins, and Karhade Brahmins.

Some Deshastha Brahmin surnames simply derived from their locations such as Nashikkar Nagarkar Mulik Muluk Neve.

Some Deshastha Brahmin surnames simply describe physical and mental characteristics such as Hirve which means green or Buddhisagar which literally translates to ocean of intellect or "Dharmik" or “Dharmik” which means "very religious".

== See also ==
- Deshastha Brahmin
- List of Deshastha Brahmins
