= Gurunath Venkatesh Bewoor =

Indian civil servant

Sir Gurunath Venkatesh Bewoor KCIE, ICS
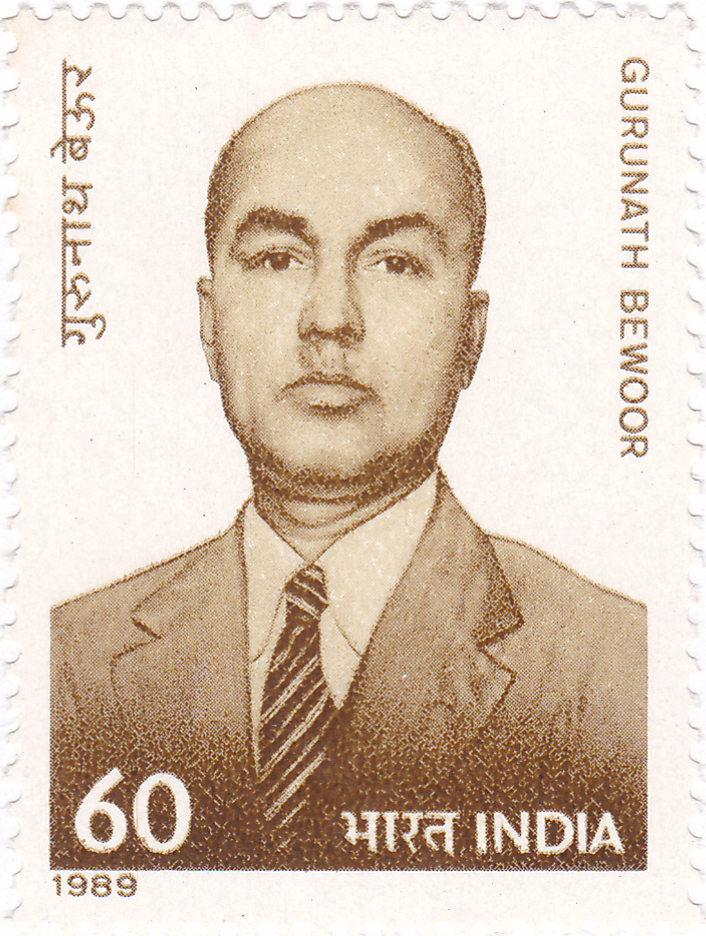
- Gurunath Venkatesh Bewoor on a 1989 stamp of India

Director-General of Posts and Telegraphs Department
- In office 1934–1941

Member of the Executive Council of the Viceroy of India
- In office July 1946 – October 1947
- Monarch: George VI of the United Kingdom
- Governor-General: The Viscount Wavell

Managing Director of Air India and Air India International
- In office 1948–1950

Personal details
- Born: 20 November 1888 Bevoor, Bijapur district, Bombay Presidency (now in Bagalkot district, Karnataka)
- Died: 2 December 1950 (aged 62)
- Spouse: Rukmini Bewoor
- Children: Gopal Gurunath Bewoor
- Education: Cambridge University
- Occupation: Administrator
- Profession: Civil servant

Sir Gurunath Venkatesh Bewoor KCIE, ICS (20 November 1888 – 2 December 1950) was an Indian civil servant. He served on the Viceroy's Executive Council during the World War II and the first Indian director of the Post and Telegraph department of India. He later served as Managing Director of Air India.

== Early life and education ==
The family name comes from Bevoor village then part of Bijapur district of the old Bombay Presidency and now in the Bagalkot district of northern Karnataka. Gurunath Bewoor was born there on 20 November 1888 in a Deshastha Madhva Brahmin family. He got his Bachelor of Arts degree from the Deccan College, Pune (then part of Bombay University, and won the Dakshina Fellowship. His further education was Cambridge University following which he passed the Indian Civil Service (ICS) entrance examination.

== Civil servant ==
Bewoor joined the ICS in 1921 in the Central Provinces cadre. After a year of district service he was transferred to the Posts and Telegraphs Department in 1922. He served as Post Master General at Patna, Nagpur and Bombay. He was appointed a CIE in the 1932 King's Birthday Honours List. In 1934, he was appointed as the Director General of the Post and Telegraph Department of India; he was knighted five years later, being officially invested as a Knight Bachelor on 20 June 1939 at Viceregal Lodge, Simla, by the Viceroy of India, Lord Linlithgow.

In 1941, he was appointed Secretary, Posts and Air Department. Despite the pressures of World War II and the disruptions caused by the Quit India movement, Bewoor efficiently managed the communications infrastructure of Britain's Indian empire. Bewoor, along with others such as C.D. Deshmukh, N. R. Pillai, Y. N. Sukthankar, R. K. Nehru, H. M. Patel, S. Jagannathan, was a member of the Finance and Commerce Pool (FCP), an elite group of Indian administrators tasked with managing the economic, commercial, industrial and supply-related issues of the war in India.

In 1946 he reached the pinnacle of the British Raj as a member of the Viceroy's Executive Council under Lord Wavell and was appointed a KCIE (Knight Commander of the Order of the Indian Empire) in the 1946 New Year Honours List.

Bewoor was the originator of a formula known as the "Bewoor Time Test" to judge the efficiency of postal work. This was based on a report he authored for the postal department in 1929, similar to the time-and-motion studies of Frederick Winslow Taylor.

== Aviation ==
In 1944, he represented India at the ICAO Conference in Chicago. He was also a member of the United Nations Transport and Communications Commission.

Sir Gurunath Bewoor died unexpectedly in December 1950.

His older son Madhav was a graduate of the Royal Military Academy Sandhurst and died during World War II. His younger son Gopal Gurunath Bewoor was the Chief of the Army Staff from 1973 to 1975.
