= List of Monuments of National Importance in Uttara Kannada district =

The following structures in Uttara Kannada district have been designated as Monuments of National Importance by the Archaeological Survey of India (ASI).

== List of monuments ==
SL. No.	Description	Location	Address	District	Coordinates	Image
N-KA-D262	Inscriptions in Markandesvara temple	Bailur		Uttara Kannada	14°07′50″N 74°29′23″E	Upload Photo
N-KA-D263	Carved bed-stead of stone in a small chamber in the south side of compound of Madhukesvara temple	Banavasi		Uttara Kannada	14°32′07″N 75°01′01″E	Carved bed-stead of stone in a small chamber in the south side of compound of Madhukesvara temple More images
N-KA-D264	Madhukesvara temple	Banavasi		Uttara Kannada	14°32′07″N 75°01′02″E	Madhukesvara temple More images
N-KA-D265	Inscriptions in Madhukesvara temple	Banavasi		Uttara Kannada	14°32′06″N 75°01′02″E	Inscriptions in Madhukesvara temple More images
N-KA-D266	Stones (Veeragals)	Bedakani		Uttara Kannada	14°19′52″N 74°50′25″E	Stones (Veeragals)
N-KA-D267	Adike Narayana Devasthan including Virupaksha devasthana	Bhatkal		Uttara Kannada	13°59′02″N 74°33′49″E	Upload Photo
N-KA-D268	Jettappa Naikana Chandranathesvara Basti	Bhatkal		Uttara Kannada	13°59′13″N 74°33′20″E	Jettappa Naikana Chandranathesvara Basti More images
N-KA-D269	Joshi Shankaranarayana Devasthana	Bhatkal		Uttara Kannada	13°59′01″N 74°33′46″E	Upload Photo
N-KA-D270	Ketpai Narayana Devasthana	Bhatkal		Uttara Kannada	13°59′01″N 74°33′45″E	Ketpai Narayana Devasthana More images
N-KA-D271	Lakar Kamati Narayana Devasthana	Bhatkal		Uttara Kannada	13°59′12″N 74°33′49″E	Upload Photo
N-KA-D272	Narasimha Devasthana	Bhatkal		Uttara Kannada	13°59′00″N 74°33′56″E	Narasimha Devasthana More images
N-KA-D273	Parsvanatha Basti	Bhatkal		Uttara Kannada	13°59′02″N 74°33′21″E	Upload Photo
N-KA-D274	Raghunatha Devasthana	Bhatkal		Uttara Kannada	13°59′19″N 74°33′25″E	Upload Photo
N-KA-D275	Shantappa Naik Tirumala Devasthana	Bhatkal		Uttara Kannada	13°59′00″N 74°33′51″E	Shantappa Naik Tirumala Devasthana More images
N-KA-D276	Three European graves	Bhatkal		Uttara Kannada	13°59′02″N 74°32′51″E	Upload Photo
N-KA-D277	Inscriptions	Bilagi		Uttara Kannada	14°21′39″N 74°47′30″E	Upload Photo
N-KA-D278	Ratnatraya Basti	Bilagi		Uttara Kannada	14°21′39″N 74°47′30″E	Upload Photo
N-KA-D279	Siva temple on the east of the river	Bilagi		Uttara Kannada	14°21′49″N 74°47′13″E	Upload Photo
N-KA-D280	Virupaksha temple	Bilagi		Uttara Kannada	14°21′25″N 74°47′34″E	Upload Photo
N-KA-D281	Virabhadra temple, inscriptions and ancient site	Gudhapur		Uttara Kannada		Upload Photo
N-KA-D282	Chandranatha Basti	Hadavalli		Uttara Kannada	14°01′50″N 74°37′56″E	Chandranatha Basti More images
N-KA-D283	Carved stones near the temple of the Gramadeva	Hosur		Uttara Kannada	14°20′25″N 74°52′59″E	Upload Photo
N-KA-D284	Figure of a Tiger opposite the English school	Kumta		Uttara Kannada	14°25′23″N 74°25′02″E	Upload Photo
N-KA-D285	Tombs on the right side of the Manku-Kumta road	Kumta		Uttara Kannada		Upload Photo
N-KA-D286	Mirjan Fort	Mirjan		Uttara Kannada	14°29′22″N 74°25′03″E	Mirjan Fort More images
N-KA-D287	Chaturmukha Basadi, Gerusoppa	Nagarbastikere Gerusoppa		Uttara Kannada	14°13′43″N 74°39′53″E	Chaturmukha Basadi, Gerusoppa More images
N-KA-D288	Inscriptions	Nagarbastikere Gerusoppa		Uttara Kannada	14°13′44″N 74°39′44″E	Upload Photo
N-KA-D289	Varhamanaswamy temple	Nagarbastikere Gerusoppa		Uttara Kannada	14°13′45″N 74°39′44″E	Upload Photo
N-KA-D290	Virabhadra temple	Nagarbastikere Gerusoppa		Uttara Kannada	14°13′44″N 74°39′46″E	Upload Photo
N-KA-D291	Temple of Shiva	Somasagar		Uttara Kannada	14°33′33″N 74°48′22″E	Upload Photo
N-KA-D292	King's seat	Sonda		Uttara Kannada	14°44′15″N 74°48′51″E	Upload Photo
N-KA-D293	Temple close to King's seat	Sonda		Uttara Kannada	14°44′12″N 74°48′50″E	Upload Photo

== See also ==
- List of Monuments of National Importance in Bangalore circle
- List of Monuments of National Importance in Belgaum district
- List of Monuments of National Importance in Bidar district
- List of Monuments of National Importance in Bijapur district
- List of Monuments of National Importance in Dharwad district
- List of Monuments of National Importance in Gulbarga district
- List of Monuments of National Importance in Raichur district
- List of Monuments of National Importance in India for other Monuments of National Importance in India
- List of State Protected Monuments in Karnataka
