= List of Monuments of National Importance in Raichur district =

The following structures in Raichur district have been designated as Monuments of National Importance by the Archaeological Survey of India (ASI).

== List of monuments ==
SL. No.	Description	Location	Address	District	Coordinates	Image
N-KA-D294	Pre-historic site	Hire-Banakal		Koppal	15°25′01″N 76°27′22″E	Pre-historic site More images
N-KA-D295	Mahadev temple	Ittagi/Itagi		Koppal	15°26′42″N 75°58′03″E	Mahadev temple More images
N-KA-D296	Ancient mound	Koppal		Koppal		Upload Photo
N-KA-D297	Rock edicts of Ashoka on the hillock known as Gavimath and Palkigundu	Koppal		Koppal	15°20′14″N 76°09′44″E	Rock edicts of Ashoka on the hillock known as Gavimath and Palkigundu More images
N-KA-D298	Ancient mound	Maski		Raichur		Upload Photo
N-KA-D299	Rock edicts of Ashoka	Maski		Raichur	15°57′26″N 76°38′29″E	Rock edicts of Ashoka More images

== See also ==
- List of Monuments of National Importance in Bangalore circle
- List of Monuments of National Importance in Belgaum district
- List of Monuments of National Importance in Bidar district
- List of Monuments of National Importance in Bijapur district
- List of Monuments of National Importance in Dharwad district
- List of Monuments of National Importance in Gulbarga district
- List of Monuments of National Importance in North Kanara district
- List of Monuments of National Importance in India for other Monuments of National Importance in India
- List of State Protected Monuments in Karnataka
