= List of Monuments of National Importance in Kalaburagi district =

The following structures in Kalaburagi district have been designated as Monuments of National Importance by the Archaeological Survey of India (ASI).

== List of monuments ==
SL. No.	Description	Location	Address	District	Coordinates	Image
N-KA-D256	Pre-historic site	Evathalli		Gulbarga		Upload Photo
N-KA-D257	Gulbarga fort and great mosque in it	Gulbarga		Gulbarga	17°20′27″N 76°49′50″E	Gulbarga fort and great mosque in it More images
N-KA-D258	Haft Gumbad (Tombs of Firozshah)	Gulbarga		Gulbarga	17°20′32″N 76°50′41″E	Haft Gumbad (Tombs of Firozshah) More images
N-KA-D259	Pre-historic site	Rajankullur		Gulbarga		Upload Photo
N-KA-D260	Ancient site	Udchan		Gulbarga		Upload Photo
N-KA-D261	Ancient excavated site remains of Buddhist Stupa	Kanaganahalli		Gulbarga	16°50′08″N 76°56′01″E	Ancient excavated site remains of Buddhist Stupa More images

== See also ==
- List of Monuments of National Importance in Bangalore circle
- List of Monuments of National Importance in Belgaum district
- List of Monuments of National Importance in Bidar district
- List of Monuments of National Importance in Bijapur district
- List of Monuments of National Importance in Dharwad district
- List of Monuments of National Importance in North Kanara district
- List of Monuments of National Importance in Raichur district
- List of Monuments of National Importance in India for other Monuments of National Importance in India
- List of State Protected Monuments in Karnataka
