= List of Monuments of National Importance in Bidar district =

Bidar is described as City of Whispering Monuments. The mountaintop town that served as the capital of medieval Deccan, has 98 monuments of which four national monuments are protected by the Archaeological Survey of India and 14 by the State Archaeology Department, Karnataka.

Bidar earned a place on the World Monument Watch list 2014.

== List of monuments in Bidar ==
SL. No.	Description	Location	Address	District	Coordinates	Image
N-KA-D37	Bahmani Tombs	Astoor		Bidar	17°54′55″N 77°33′41″E	Bahmani Tombs More images
N-KA-D38	Barid Shahi tombs	Bidar		Bidar	17°55′12″N 77°30′12″E	Barid Shahi tombs More images
N-KA-D39	Bidar Fort	Bidar		Bidar	17°55′16″N 77°31′52″E	Bidar Fort More images
N-KA-D40	Madarsa Mahmud Gawan	Bidar		Bidar	17°54′53″N 77°31′49″E	Madarsa Mahmud Gawan More images

== See also ==
- List of Monuments of National Importance in Bangalore circle
- List of Monuments of National Importance in Belgaum district
- List of Monuments of National Importance in Bijapur district
- List of Monuments of National Importance in Dharwad district
- List of Monuments of National Importance in Gulbarga district
- List of Monuments of National Importance in North Kanara district
- List of Monuments of National Importance in Raichur district
- List of Monuments of National Importance in India for other Monuments of National Importance in India
- List of State Protected Monuments in Karnataka
