= Cholachagudda =

- village
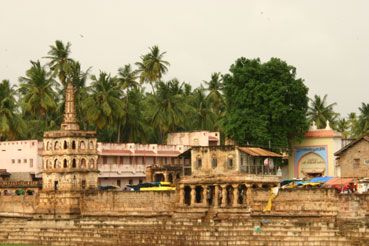
- A view of Banashankari temple complex

- Location in Karnataka, India Cholachagudda (India)
- Coordinates: 15.8722°N 75.7200°E
- Country: India
- State: Karnataka
- District: Bagalkot District

Government
  - Type: Panchayati raj (India)
  - Body: Gram panchayat

Languages
  - Official: Kannada
- Time zone: UTC+5:30 (IST)
- ISO 3166 code: IN-KA
- Vehicle registration: KA
- Website: karnataka.gov.in

Cholachagudda is in Bagalkot District (Badami Taluka) Karnataka State of India, it is near Badami. It is on the bank of Malaprabha river which is a tributary of Krishna river. It has two famous Hindu temples dedicated to Banashankari and Virabadhreshwara. It is known for its paan leaves plantation, clove-chillies and banana plantations.

== See also ==
- Banashankari Temple at Cholachagudda
- Badami
- Pattadakal
- Mahakuta
- Aihole
- Gajendragad
- Sudi
- North Karnataka
