= Narayan Virkar =

Narayan Vinayak Virkar (1890–1968) was an Indian photographer for the National Congress Party, known for his images of Indian leaders and the pictures he took of the Jallianwalla Bagh Massacre aftermath.
