= Kadrolli =

- Village
- Location in Karnataka, India Kadrolli (India)
- Coordinates: 15.79°N 74.75°E
- Country: India
- State: Karnataka
- District: Belgaum
- Talukas: Bailhongal

Area
  - Total: 0.35 km^{2} (0.14 sq mi)

Population (2001)
  - Total: 5,481
  - Density: 16,000/km^{2} (41,000/sq mi)

Languages
  - Official: Kannada
- Time zone: UTC+5:30 (IST)

Kadrolli is a village in the southern state of Karnataka, India. It is located in the Bailhongal taluk of Belgaum district in Karnataka.

== Demographics ==
As of 2001 Indian census, Kadrolli had a population of 5,481 comprising 2,763 males and 2,718 females.

== See also ==
- Belgaum
- Districts of Karnataka
