= Banashankari Amma Temple =

Hindu shrine in Karnataka, India

Shri Shakambhari Shakti Peetha, Cholachagudda, Badami
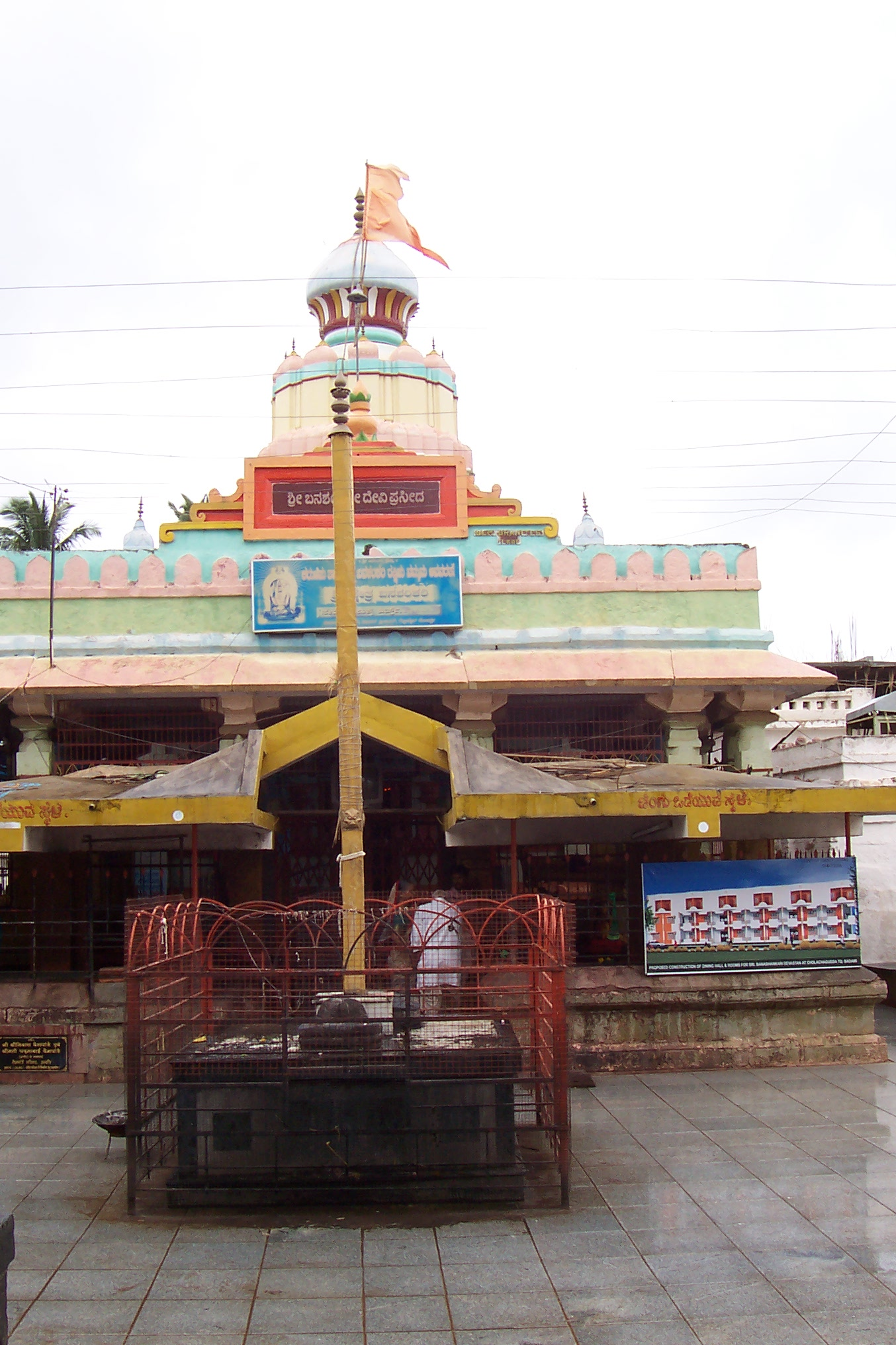

- Location in Karnataka

Religion
- Affiliation: Hinduism
- District: Bagalkot
- Deity: Shakambhari or Banashankari, form of goddess Parvati
- Festival: Banashankari jatre

Location
- Location: Badami
- State: Karnataka
- Country: India
- Coordinates: 15°53′14″N 75°42′18″E

Architecture
- Type: Dravidian architecture
- Creator: Originally Chalukyas
- Completed: 18th century (current structure), original temple 7th century

Banashankari Devi Temple (or Banashankari temple) is a Hindu shrine located at Cholachagudda near Badami, in Bagalkot district, Karnataka, India. The temple is popularly called 'Shakambhari' 'Banashankari or Vanashankari' since it is located in the Tilakaaranya forest. The temple deity is also called the Shakambhari (Kannada: ಶಾಕoಭರಿ), an incarnation of the goddess Parvati.

The temple attracts devotees from Karnataka as well as the neighbouring state of Maharashtra. The original temple was built by the 7th-century Badami Chalukya kings, who worshipped goddess Banashankari as their tutelary deity. The temple celebrates its annual festival called Banashankari jatre, in the months of January or February. The festival comprises cultural programmes, boat festival as well as a Rath yatra, when the temple goddess is paraded around the city in a chariot. Banshakhari is a form of Maa Shakambhari Devi whose real, main and ancient temple is located in Saharanpur District in Uttar Pradesh. It is also known as Shaktipeeth Shakambhari Devi. There are statues of Bhima, Bhramari, Shatakshi and Ganesha along with mother.

== Etymology and other names ==
Banshankari or Vanashankari is made up of two Sanskrit words: vana ("forest") and Shankari ("the consort of Shiva, Parvati"). The temple is popularly called Vanashankari since it is located in the Tilakaaranya forest. The transformation of vana- to bana- reflects a common loanword adaptation in Kannada from Sanskrit words. The other popular name given is Shakambhari, which means the "Vegetable Goddess". It is formed by joining the two words Shaka and Ambari. In Sanskrit, Shaka means vegetables or vegan food and Ambari means "one who wears or bears to the hungry". A further elaboration is that "Shakambhari" comes from Shakam joined with the root Bhri (Shaka = vegetables or food and root bhri = to nourish).

Locals also call the temple goddess as Balavva, Banadavva, Sunkavva, Shiravanthi, Chowdamma and Vanadurge. It is said that Banashankari is the sixth incarnation of the warrior-goddess Durga.

== History ==
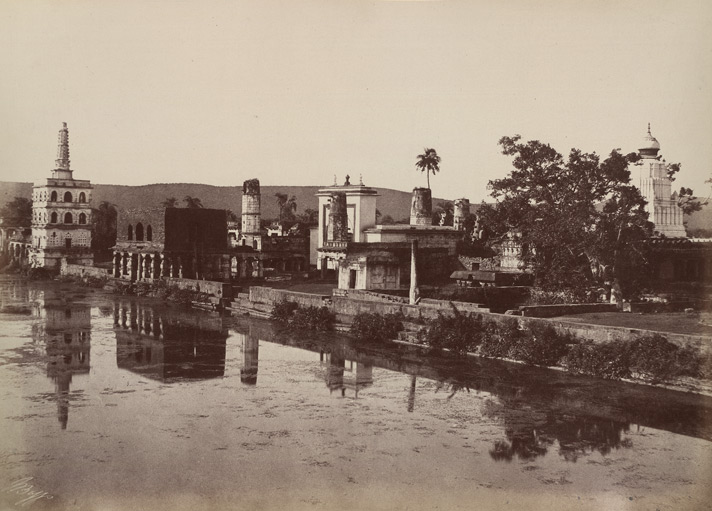
A complete view of Banashankari temple complex in 1855

Historians have dated the original temple to the 7th century CE - the Kalyani Chalukya period to Jagadekamalla I in 603 CE (according to epigraphic inscriptions) who installed the image of the goddess. The present refurbished temple was built in 1750, by Parusharam Agale, a Maratha chieftain.

It is also said that the original temple was in existence even before the reign of the Chalukyas who gave royal favour to the beliefs of the Vaishnava, Shaivaite, Jain and Shakta religious orders. They worshipped Banashankari as a form of Shakti, their Supreme Goddess. Epigraphic inscriptions mention that Jagadekamalla I renovated the temple with several additions. Another inscription in Kannada language on a pillar located on the northern side of the temple dated to 1019 CE, describes the bravery of the Rashtrakuta king Bhimadeva. The Deepa Stambas (lamp pillar) are seen at the entrance to the temple; the construction of these, as per an inscription, are ascribed to the warrior Ketimayya.

== Structure ==
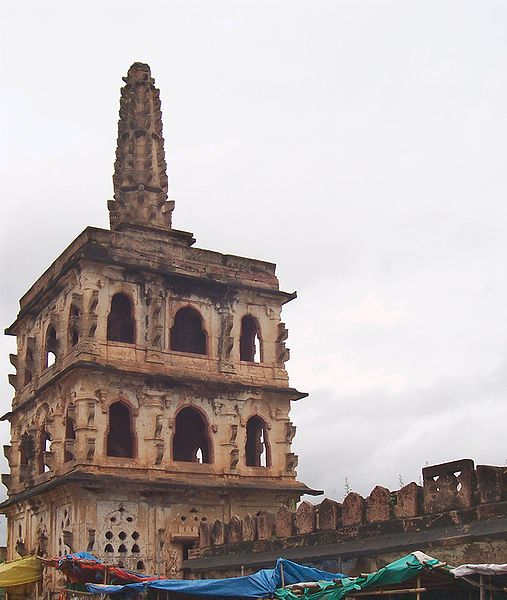
The Guard tower cum Deepa Stamba (lamp tower) on the bank of the water tank in front of the Shakambari temple

The temple was built initially in the Dravidian architectural style. The rebuilt structure is in the Vijayanagara architectural style. The temple is enclosed by a high wall on all sides. The main structure has a mukha mantapa (portico), ardha mantapa (entrance porch/chamber in front of the sanctum) and a sanctum topped by a Vimana (tower). The main sanctum of the temple has the image of goddess Banashankari deified in it. The black stone sculpture depicts the goddess seated on a lioness trampling a demon under her foot. The goddess has eight arms and holds a trishul (trident), damaru (hand drum), kapaalpatra (skull cup), ghanta (war bell), Vedic scriptures, khadga-kheta (sword and shield) and severed head of demon. The goddess was the Kuladevi (tutelary deity) of the Chalukyas. The goddess Banashankari is the tutelary god for Devanga Community. The Devanga weaver community in particular, holds this goddess in great reverence. Banashankari is also the tutelary deity of some Deshastha Brahmins.

There is a 360 ft (109.7 m) square water tank in the forefront of the temple at the entrance, which is locally called Haridra Tirtha, a corrupted version of the name Harishchandra Tirtha. The pond is enclosed with stone mantapas (halls) on three sides. A pradakshina or circumambulatory path surrounds the tank.

Lamp towers (Deepa stambhas) are seen in the foreground of the temple on the west bank of the pond and also at the entrance. The tower on the bank of the tank is also an uncommon guard tower which is "reflects the Vijayanagara blend of Hindu and Islamic style". It is called the Victory Tower.

== Legend ==
The scriptures Skanda Purana and Padma Purana state that the demon Durgamasura harassed the local people constantly. Answering the prayers of the Devas (demi-gods) who appealed to God through a sacrifice to protect them from Durgamasura, the Lord directed the goddess Shakambari to help the people. The goddess appeared through the fire of the Yagna (fire-sacrifice) in the form of the goddess Shakambari. She then killed the demon after a fierce encounter and restored peace in the region. Banashankari is considered as the incarnation of goddess Parvati, who is the consort of god Shiva.

The forests around the temple have coconut, plantain and betel leaf plants and trees. Hence, it is also said that during a severe famine, the goddess provided vegetables and food for the people to survive and thus, the goddess was given the name Shakambari.

== Banashankari jatre ==
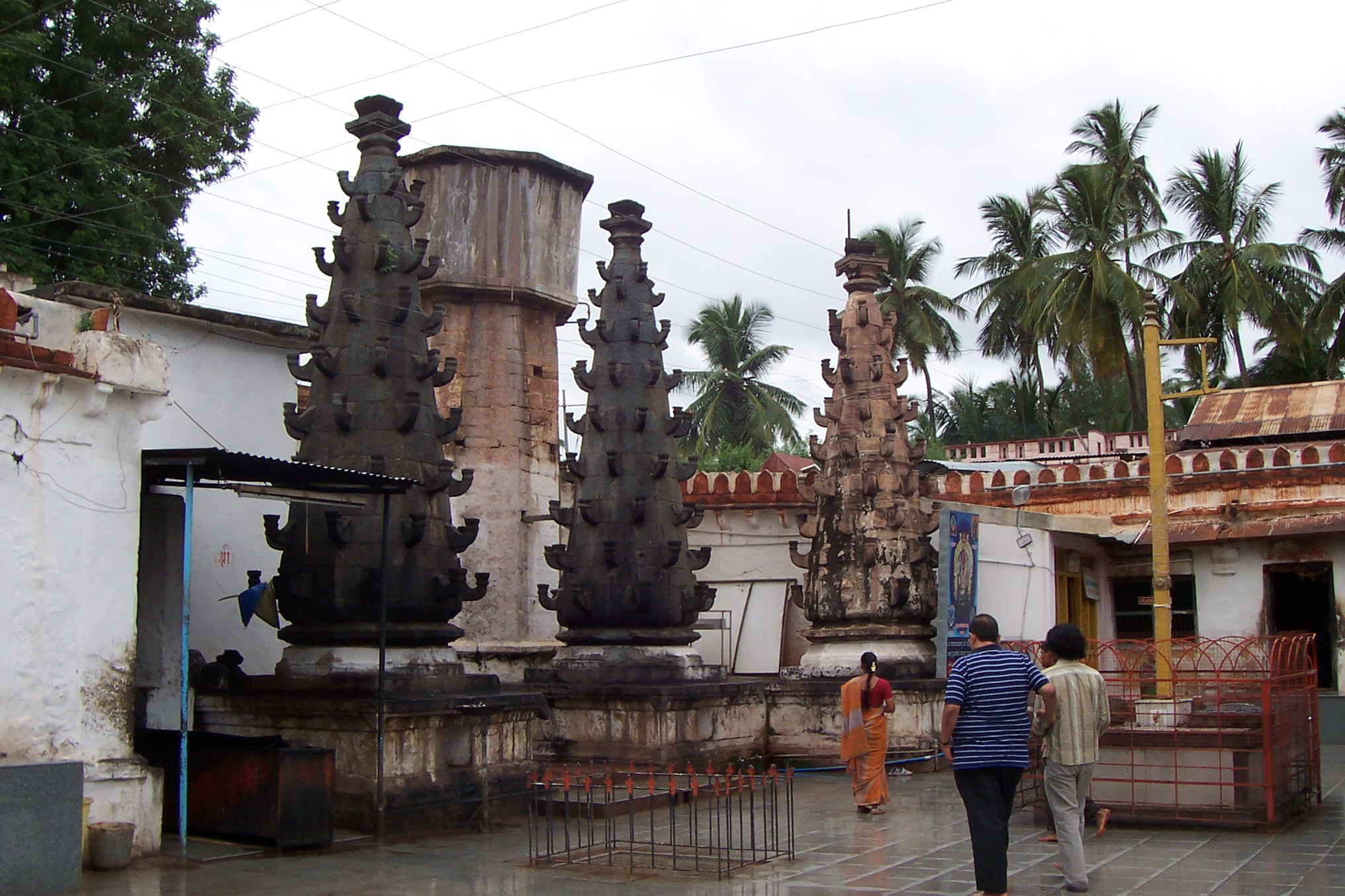
Courtyard of the Banashankari temple with deepa stambas, lamp towers

Banashankari jatre ('jatre' means a "fair") is held as a religious cum cultural festival, at the temple precincts every year on the occasion of the Rath yatra, for a period of about three weeks starting from the Rath yatra. Its starts on 8th day of Pushya masa. ಬನದ ಹುಣ್ಣಿಮ celebrated on full moon day. No past data is traceable confirming the beginning of such a festival, but it is inferred that it was started some two hundred years back. Pilgrims from across Karnataka and also the neighboring state of Maharashtra belonging to different religious beliefs, congregate here in large numbers to celebrate the festival. The time is considered auspicious to even fix marriages and purchase agricultural implements. Cultural programmes (music, drama and circus) are held to entertain the largely rural community who flock the venue to not only worship their favorite deity but also for fun and frolic. It symbolizes cultural bonding between people of different communities here. A unique feature is that many shops and kiosks set up during the festival selling vermilion, clothing, sacred threads and sweets are operated by Muslims who also display a portrait of goddess Banashankari in their shops. Another interesting marketing activity seen at this venue is of the sale, by artisans of Holeyalur and surrounding areas, of elaborately engraved door frames and doors made in teak, acacia and other varieties of wood. Cattle fair is also held during this festival. Speciality of the cattle fair is the focus on sale of white bulls.

During the festival, the temple and town are decorated with hundreds of varieties of leaves and flowers. In the fair, which starts on Bandhashtami day, a Palleda Habba or the Vegetable Utsava or festival is also held when at the start itself 108 varieties of food items (called ‘bazi’ in local language) made of vegetables are offered to the deity.

The festival also marks another unique event namely, the Teppotsava (the boat festival) held in the temple tank. During this event, parents use boats made of banana stems to ferry newly born children blessed by the grace of the goddess around the pond seeking good luck to their children.

=== Rath yatra ===
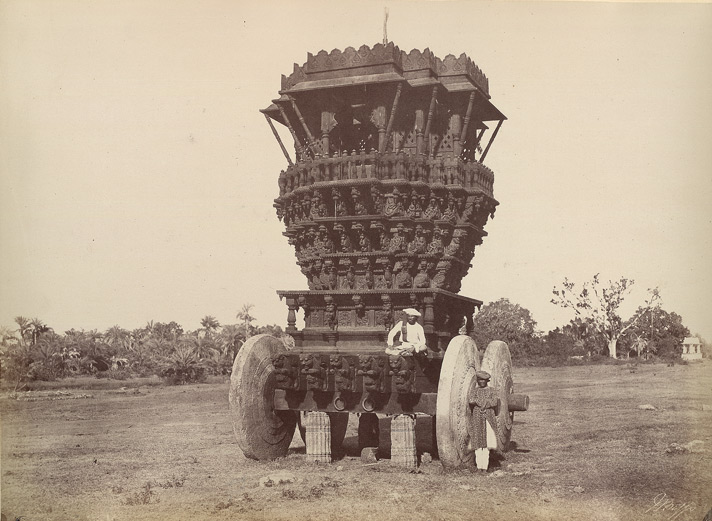
Banashankari wooden Ratha, a photo taken in 1855 by Thomas Biggs (car or chariot)

The Rath Yatra or chariot festival of the goddess held every year starts on the full moon day of the Hindu month Pausha (January) in which the temple goddess Parvati is taken in the chariot (a movable shrine) in a procession along the streets of the Cholachagudd village from the temple gate to Padhkatte, another nearby sculpture. The Rath yatra is witnessed by thousands of people, irrespective of their caste and creed from across the state. To see this cultural and religious extravaganza, people from adjacent villages come in colorfully decorated carts.

During the religious celebrations in Hindu temples, images of the gods and goddesses worshipped in the temples, are taken on large wooden chariots called rathas and drawn in a pageant by the devotees. The chariots are generally 5–6 m (16.4–19.7 ft) in height and weigh several tonnes. Huge wheels of solid wood are fixed to the chariot. The chariot is pulled by specially trained men. The chariot appears like a mini temple or shrine as it invariably has figurines of gods and goddesses carved on it.

== Location and access ==
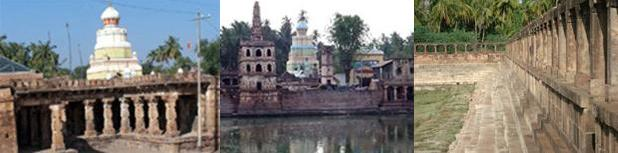
Montage of views of the water tank in front of the temple

The Banashankari temple located to the south of Badami and the Badami town itself are enclosed between two gorges. The valley formed by the two gorges has steep sandstone ridges. The soil formation is termed black cotton soil.

The temple is located at Cholachagudd about 5 km (3.1 mi) from Badami on the road to Gadag. Badami Railway Station, served by the South Western Railways, is the nearest railhead. Badami is well connected by a good network of roads to all parts of Karnataka and is 495 km (307.6 mi) from Bangalore and 125 km (77.7 mi) from Hubli, which is the nearest airport. In the fair all type of ornaments, jewelry, wall doors, clothes and bangles, and sweets are available. It is a fair of 12 days.
