= Mecca Masjid, Bijapur =

Mosque in Bijapur, Karnataka, India

Mecca Masjid
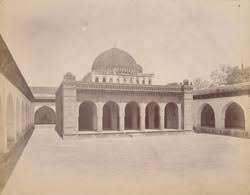
- The east façade of the mosque, in c. 1880s

- Location of the mosque in Karnataka

Religion
- Affiliation: Islam
- Ecclesiastical or organizational status: Mosque
- Status: Active

Location
- Location: Vijayapura, Bijapur, Karnataka
- Country: India
- Interactive map of Mecca Masjid
- Coordinates: 16°49′31″N 75°43′12″E

Architecture
- Type: Mosque architecture
- Completed: c. 1669

Specifications
- Dome: One
- Minaret: Two (maybe more)

Monument of National Importance
- Official name: Makka Masjid
- Reference no.: N-KA-D159

The Mecca Masjid, also known as Makka Masjid, is a mosque located in the Vijayapura district of Bijapur, in the state of Karnataka, India. Believed to be completed in c. 1669, the mosque was built for women of the royal household.

The mosque structure is a Monument of National Importance.

== History ==
The date of construction of the mosque is not known. In The New Cambridge History of India, it is ascribed to the reign of Ali Adil Shah II, while Henry Cousens dates it to the end of the 13th century. There is a tomb of a saint at the eastern end of the enclosure, who had probably commissioned the mosque. The minarets are remnants of an earlier structure, probably an earlier mosque, built during the Bahamani dynasty. Cousens opines that the high walls built around the mosque, indicate that it was used as an elephant stable. He opines that the earlier mosque, in its ruinous state, was used as an elephant stable before the newer mosque was built.

== Architecture ==
The mosque is located within an open court, enclosed on all four sides by arched cloisters. The arches of the cloisters have low piers, similar to those of the Jama Mosque, Kalaburagi. The façade of the mosque contains five arched entrances, and a cusped outline emphasizes the central arch. It is surmounted by a hemispherical dome, carried on a terrace with eight arches. A two-tiered parapet rises above the façade, and a chhatri is placed upon each of the buttresses at the corners.

The western wall containing the mihrab is decorated with carvings. There is no pulpit within the mosque, as women's prayers are not preceded with a sermon.

== See also ==
- Islam in India
- List of mosques in India
