= Ain-ul-Mulk's Tomb =

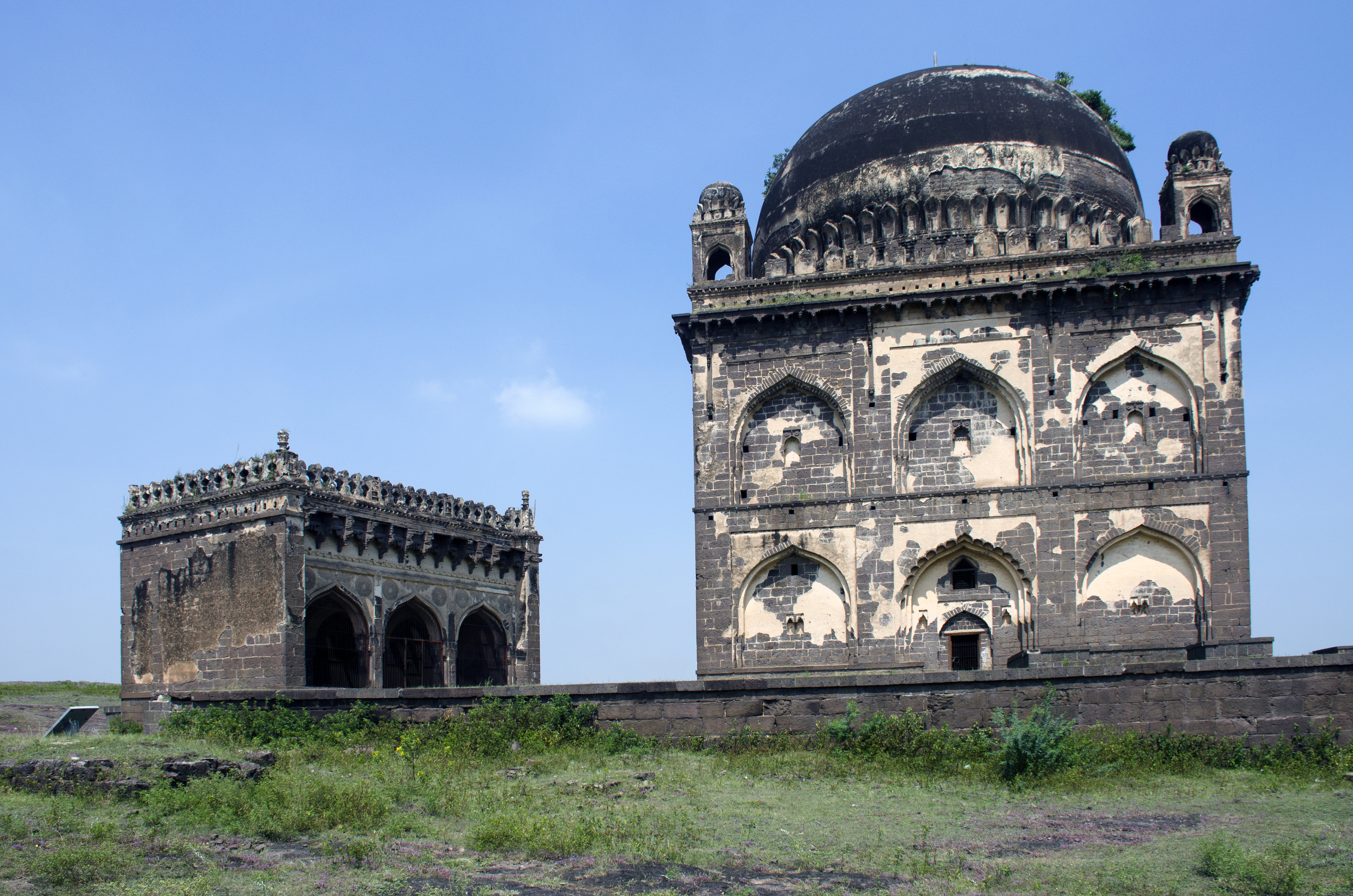
- Interactive map of Ain-ul-Mulk's Tomb
- Location: Bijapur
- Coordinates: 16.8346491°N 75.7680482°E

Monument of National Importance
- Official name: Ain-ul-mulk's tomb
- Reference no.: N-KA-D124

Ain-ul-Mulk's Tomb, also known as Chota Gumbaz, is a mausoleum located on the outskirts of Bijapur, in the Indian state of Karnataka. It is listed as a monument of national importance.

== History ==
The tomb was built during the Adil Shahi period for Ain-ul-Mulk, a nobleman in the court of Ibrahim I. Ain-ul-Mulk had rebelled against the sultan and was killed in 1556.

== Description ==
It is located in Ainapur, which is a suburb of Bijapur located about 2.5 kilometers east of the main city.

The tomb is a square building surmounted by a large, hemispherical dome. Domed pavilions are provided on all four corners of the main dome. The facade has two tiers of three recessed arches on all its sides. Its walls are decorated with stucco work.

=== Mosque ===
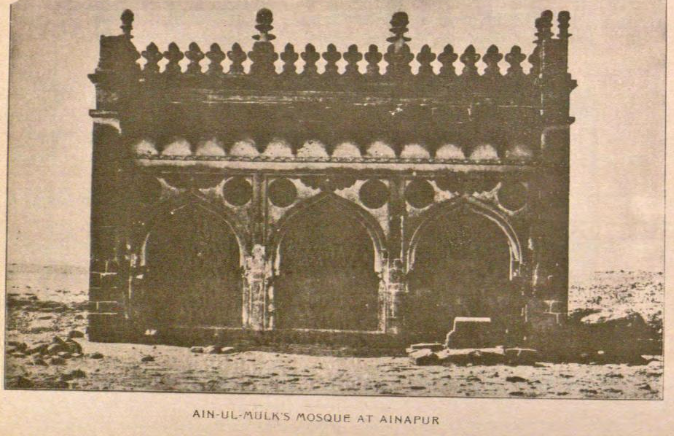
Mosque beside Ain-ul-Mulk's Tomb

A highly decorated mosque is located beside the tomb. A parapet wall runs along the roof, dotted by pot-like finials with domical tops.
