= Belgaum Fort =

Fort in Belgaum, Karnataka, India

- Part of Belgaum
- Karnataka, India
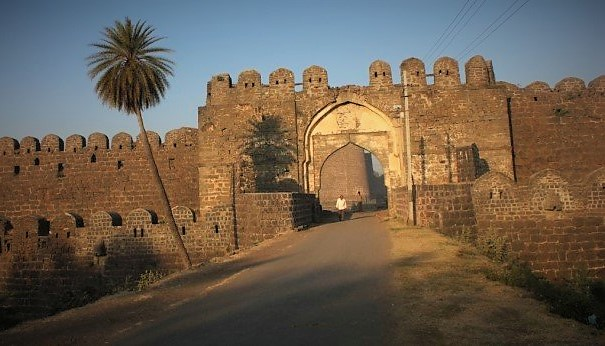
- Main Gate to the Fort

Site information
- Type: Fortress
- Controlled by: Government of Karnataka
- Open to the public: Yes
- Condition: Ruins

Location
- Coordinates: 15.8583333°N 74.5244444°E

Site history
- Built: 13th century
- Built by: Original by Ratta Dynasty and fortified by Yakub Ali Khan of the Bijapur Sultanate
- Materials: Granite stones and mud

Belgaum Fort is in the city of Belgaum, in the Belgaum district, in Karnataka state, India. It was begun by Jaya Raya, also called Bichi Raja, an ally of the Ratta dynasty, in the year 1204. It has undergone several renovations over the centuries under dynastic rulers of the region.

The fort, built with ramparts and a large moat, with historical and religious monuments dated to the Adil Shahi dynasty.

The fort has been captured in battles many times, as the possession of local rulers, until the region was stabilized by the British Raj. It is notable in modern history because Mahatma Gandhi was imprisoned by the British in this fort during India's freedom struggle.

== Geography ==
The fort is in the foothills of the Sahyadri mountain range of (Western Ghats) in the precincts of the Belagavi town (which was also known as Belgaum or 'Venugrama' meaning bamboo village), at an altitude of about 762 metres (2,500 ft), 100 km (62 mi) from the Arabian Sea. The Markandeya River flows nearby.

There is a Lake in front of the Fort known as Killa Lake.

== History ==
The fort's history is traced to the Ratta Dynasty with lineage to the Rashtrakuta Dynasty (earlier chieftains of Saundatti, who later shifted their capital to Belgaum), Vijayanagara rulers, Bijapur Sultans or Bahmanis, Marathas (Shivaji Maharaj)and finally by the British in that order. Before Rattas, Shatavahanas, Chalukyas and Kadambas from Goa have ruled over the region.

The Belgaum fort belonged to the Ratta dynasty from the time it was built in 1204 by a Ratta officer named Bichiraja. Belgaum, the city around the fort, served as the capital of that dynasty between 1210 and 1250. Rattas were defeated by the Yadava Dynasty of Devagiri, and they briefly controlled the fort. At the turn of the 14th century, the Khaljis of Delhi invaded and succeeded in ruining the indigenous powers of the region – the Yadava and the Hoysalas —without providing a viable administration. This lacuna was made good by the Vijayanagara Empire, which had become the established power of the area by 1336.

In 1474, the Bahmani Sultanate, then ruling from Bidar, captured the fort of Belgaum under the leadership of Mahamood Gawan. In 1518, the Bahamani Sultanate split up into five small states, and Belgaum became part of the Adilshahi sultanate of Bijapur. The Ismail Adil Shah of Adilshahi dynasty reinforced the fort with the help of Asad Khan Lari (a Persian from the province of Lar) and much of the existing structures dates from 1519.

In Belgaum, the rule of Adilshahs began in the times of Ismail Adil Shah. Asad Khan Lari assisted Ismail in the battle for the fort and conferred with Belgaum as his jagir in 1511 (in 1519, Asad Khan completed the Masjid Safa in the Belgaum fort).

In 1686, the Mughal emperor Aurangzeb defeated the Bijapur sultanate, and Belgaum came under his control. This was a short-lived control because, after the death of Aurangzeb in 1707, the Mughal empire's control declined. With this changed situation, the Maratha confederacy was taken over by the Peshwas. In 1776, Hyder Ali of Mysore won over this region, but only for a short period. The Peshwas, with British assistance, defeated Hyder Ali and regained control of Belgaum. With changed circumstances over the years, the same British attacked the Belgaum fort, which was under Peshwas control. They held it under siege from 21 March to 12 April 1818 and took control of the fort and deposed the Peshwas. Shivalinga Raju, the Kittur Desai, helped the British in this attack on the fort. As a reward, the British allowed Desai to rule over Belgaum town and the fort.

The fort is currently used as the regional headquarters of the Indian Army.

== Fort structure ==
Belgaum Fort is one of the oldest in the state of Karnataka. It had fortifications designed to repel attacks of invading armies. It was originally built by Bichiraja (Ratta Dynasty) in 1204.

Built in an undulating plain, the fort has an oval shape and is surrounded by a deep and wide moat excavated in soft red stone. The external side is a broad esplanade with bastions which rise to about 32 feet (9.8 m) from the bottom of the moat. The internal dimensions of the fort, which has a level ground, is 1,000 yards (910 m) in length and 800 yards (730 m) in width.

Two massive bastions flanked by a large gate, which was originally an entry gate through a bridge, has since been blocked. The gate now in use (said to have been designed by a Brahmin) is considered a fine specimen of Indian architecture. It has a guard chamber, a "groined roof once ornamented with pendants". The exterior of the gate is decorated with large motifs of animals and birds. The gateway is covered by massive doors made of iron designed for defense. An inscription on the top of the arch of the gate in Persian ascribes its building to Jakub Ali Khan. The inscription reads:

"Jakub Ali Khan, who is a joy to the heart, by whose benevolence the world is prosperous, built the wall of the fort from its base as strong as the barrier of Sicardis."

In 1631 the main gate of the fort was built.

There is a western gate with an archway, which is guarded only by a chain stretched across two old cannons. This provides access from a sloping road crossed by a causeway over the moat.

The fort has Hindu, Jain and Muslim architectural influence with temples and mosques within its limits, indicating cultural syncretism. The architectural styles seen in the mosques are of the Indo-Saracenic and Deccan type. The fort has been built with stones and mud. A wide moat runs round the fort.

== Temples ==
=== Jain temples ===
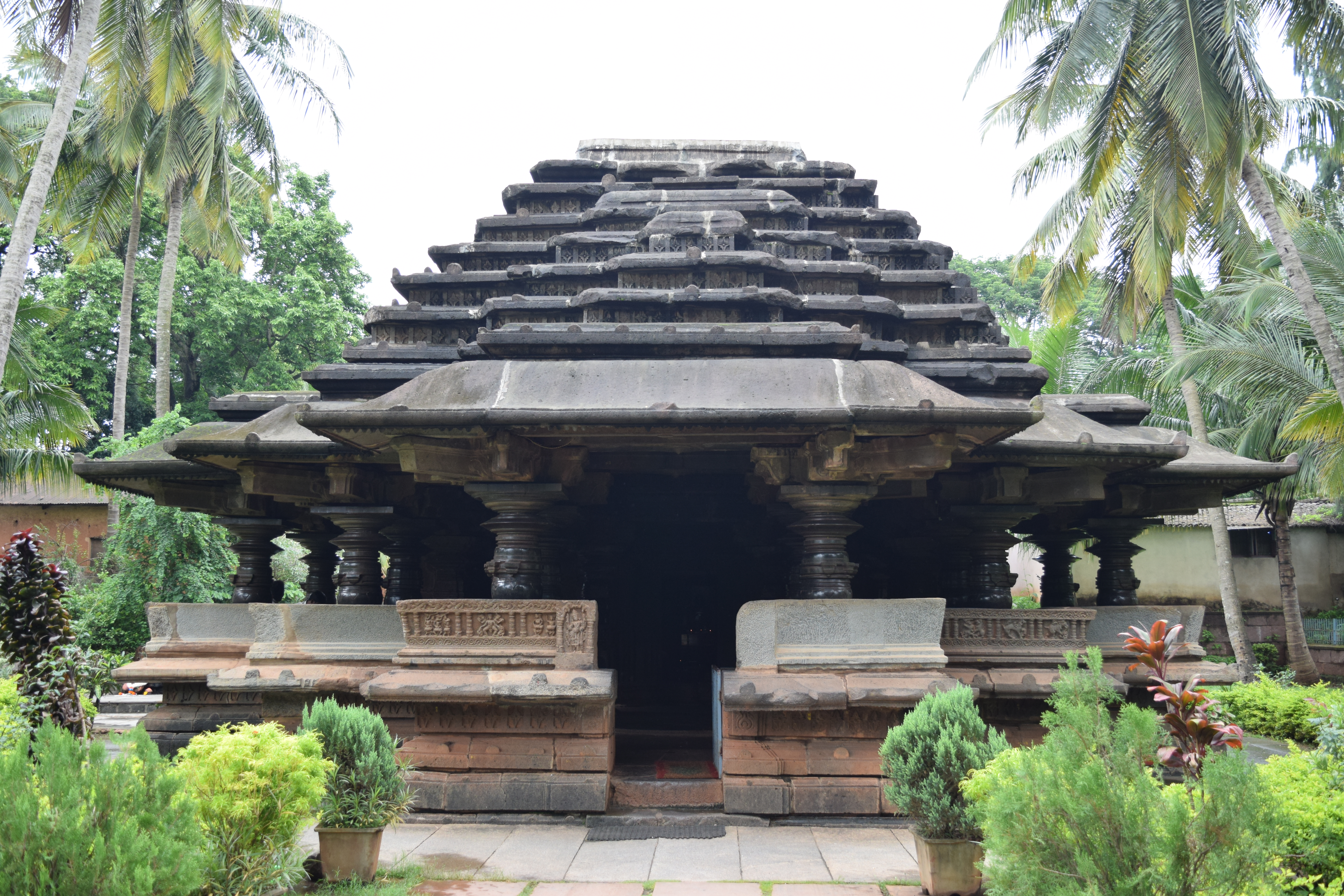
Kamal Basadi Jain temple in Belgaum

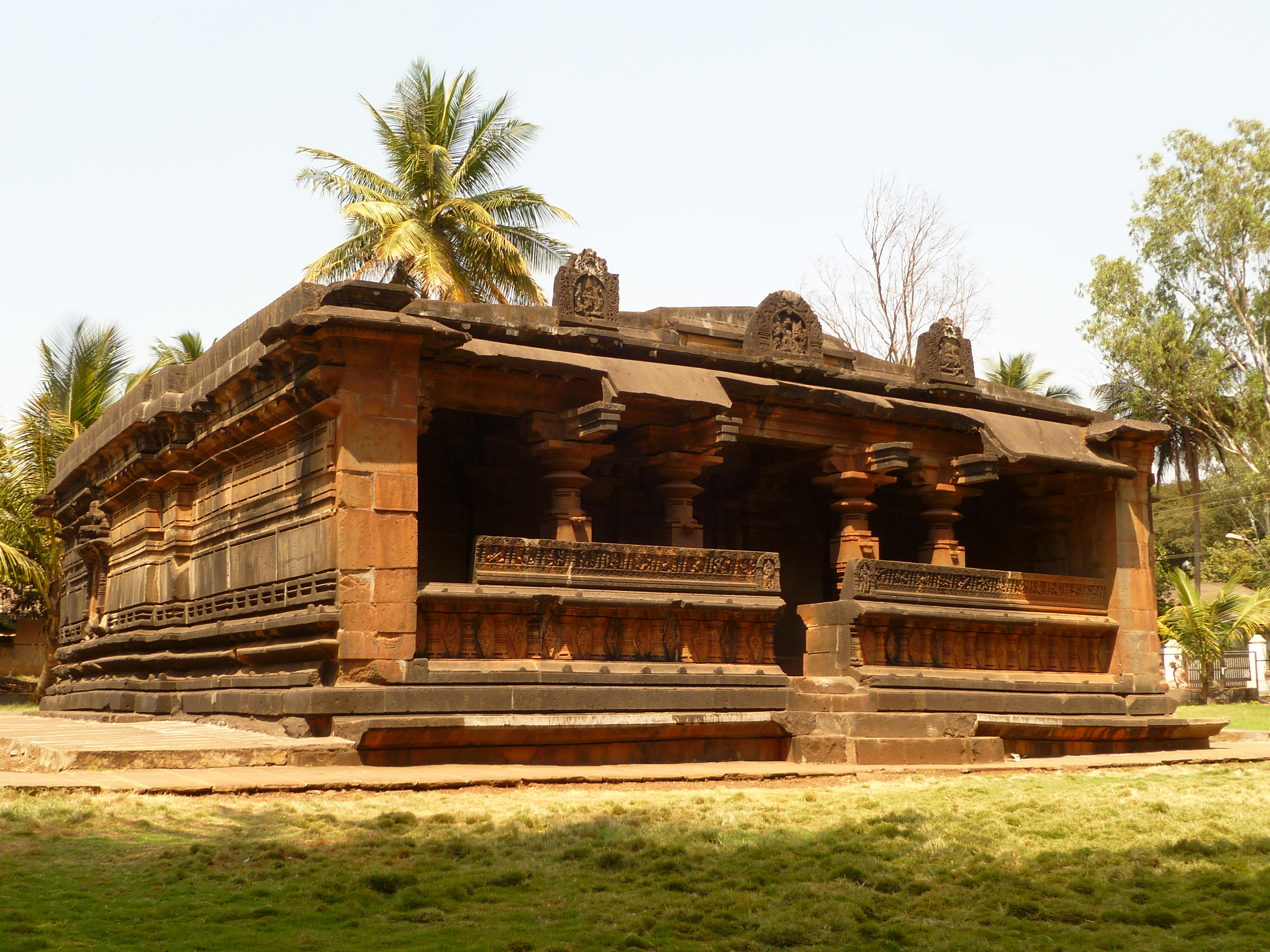
The second Jain temple, Chikki Basadi in ruins

Of the two Jain temples inside the fort, the 'Kamal Basadi', a basadi with the Neminatha idol in black stone (found in a forest nearby) deified on a stone-carved pedestal, is more famous. It was built in 1204. The other temple, called the 'Chikki Basadi', is in ruins (see picture). Both temples were built inside the fort in the Chalukyan architecture style.

The Mukhamantapa (Mukha main hall) of the Kamal Basadi is very impressive, with a neatly depicted lotus carving projecting from the ceiling. It is accessed through steps partly enclosed by a balustrade with a large dome of great beauty. Lotus flowers, designed in concave shape, spaced at 1-foot intervals (30 cm), arranged in concentric circles in decreasing layers and depicting a central blossom of the lotus, decorate the roof. The lotus pendant is covered by a large pyramidal roof.

The pillars that support the roof with the lotus pendant are founded on plinths. Some pillars made of black basaltic stones (said to have magnetic characteristics) are highly polished. It is named the Kamal Basadi since the tower of the temple depicts kamal (lotus) with 72 petals, which presently displays images of the past 24 tirthankaras but can depict the present and future thirthankars. The pillars are well carved with decorations and neatly polished.

Other idols seen in the temple are of Bhagwan Sumatinath in the kayotsarga posture, Bhagwan Parshvanath under the shade of seven-hooded serpent (Nagaraj), Bhagwan Adinath in the padmasana posture and the Navagraha. The Archeology Department renovated this temple in 1996.

The second Jain temple, Chikki Basadi, in ruins now, was once considered as a "remarkable piece of Jain architecture". It has a frontage that displays festooned rows of dancing figurines, musicians, and trimmed flowers.

=== Hindu temples ===
There are two Hindu shrines at the fort entrance: one devoted to Ganesha and another to goddess Durga. The Durga temple is dedicated to multi-armed goddess Durga, as considered the goddess of forts and warfare. It is in a corner of the fort. The outer facade of the temple exhibits painted images of mythological figures.

=== Mosques ===
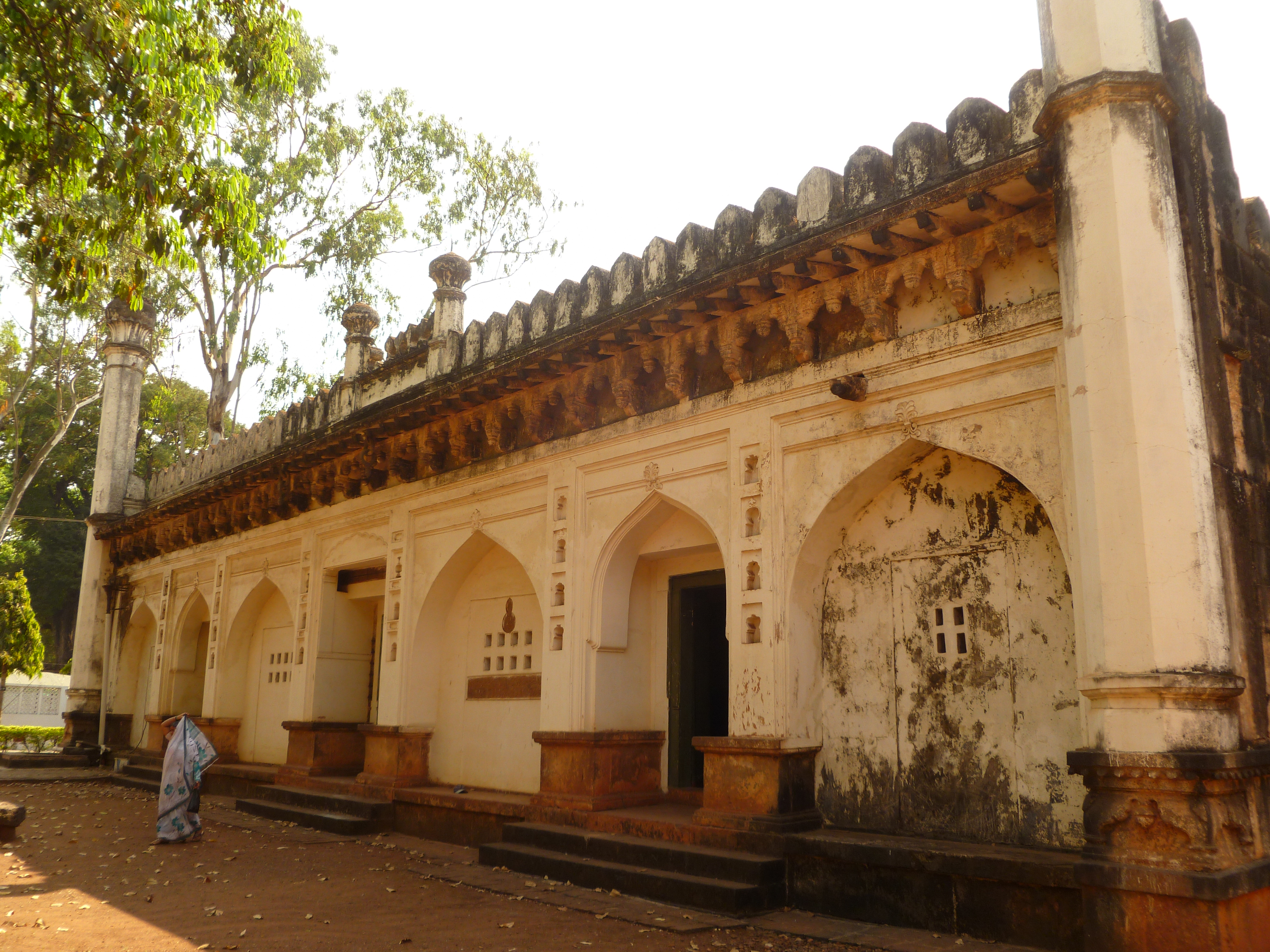
Safa_masjid in the fort

The fort has two mosques or masjids: Safa Masjid and Jamia Masjid. The former mosque is the most frequented by the Muslim population of Belgaum. Safa Masjid was completed in 1519 by Asad Khan Lari (testified by the Persian inscription). The mosque's pillars have exquisite inscriptions in a fusion of Nagari and Persian styles. It is said that two of the pillars are from Hindu temples and have Kannada inscriptions in Nāgarī scripts. One pillar dated to 1199 is credited to Ratta King Kartaveerya IV and the other pillar dated to 1261 is credited to Sevuna (Yadava) Krishna. The Jamia Masjid, dated 1585–86, was built by Sher Khan.

== Access ==
The fort is in the precincts of Belgaum city (which is in the northwestern parts of Karnataka) and lies at the border of two states: Maharashtra and Goa. It is well connected by road, rail and air services to all parts of the country.

Belgaum is connected by road via the National Highway 4 (connecting Maharashtra (now part of the Golden Quadrilateral), Karnataka, Andhra Pradesh and Tamil Nadu) and NH 4A (connecting Karnataka and Goa). The road distance is 502 kilometres (312 mi) to Bangalore (on the Bangalore-Pune highway); 515 km (320 mi) to Hyderabad and 500 km (310 mi) to Mumbai. It is midway between Bangalore and Mumbai.

The distances to the nearest cities in the border states of Maharashtra and Goa are Hubbali - 94 km (58 mi), Dharwad - 70 km (43 mi), Mangalore - 438 km (272 mi), Goa-125 km (78 mi), Kolhapur - 103 km (64 mi) and Pune - 336 km (209 mi). It is close to the bus station.

The airport serving the city is Belgaum Airport at Sambra which is the oldest airport in North Karnataka. It is 10 km (6.2 mi) from the city.

Belgaum is well connected by rail to major destinations such as Bangalore, Mumbai (via Miraj) and Goa.
