= Konnur (Rural) =

Konnur Gokak Road (Konnur railway station)
- Municipal council
- Location in Karnataka, India Konnur (India)
- Coordinates: 16.2013°N 74.7436°E
- Country: India
- State: Karnataka
- District: Belagavi
- Established: 1979
- Talukas: gokak

Government
  - Type: Municipal council
- Elevation: 606 m (1,988 ft)

Population (2011)
  - Total: 27,474

Languages
  - Official: Kannada
- Time zone: UTC+5:30 (IST)
- PIN: 591231
- Telephone code: 08332
- Vehicle registration: KA 49
- Nearest city: gokak
- Lok Sabha constituency: belgaum
- Vidhan Sabha constituency: gokak
- Website: http://www.konnurtown.mrc.gov.in

Konnur is a city in Gokak taluk, Belgaum district in Karnataka, India. The Konnur railway station (Gokak road) is located in Konnur 11 km from Gokak. It is near famous water falls like Gokak falls and Godachinamalki.
