= Nav Gumbaz =

Mosque in Bijapur, Karnataka, India

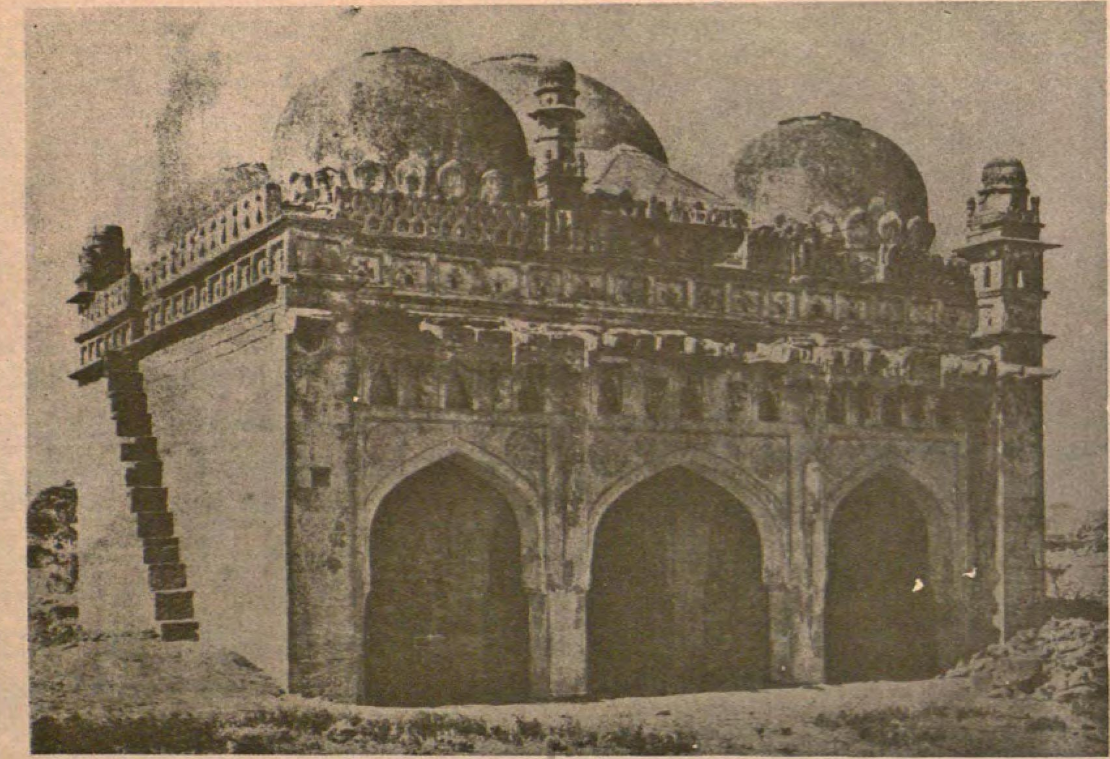
- The mosque, c. 1916

- Location of the mosque in Karnataka

Religion
- Affiliation: Islam
- Ecclesiastical or organizational status: Mosque
- Status: Active

Location
- Location: Bijapur, Karnataka
- Country: India
- Interactive map of Nav Gumbaz
- Coordinates: 16°49′34″N 75°43′36″E

Architecture
- Type: Mosque architecture
- Style: Indo-Islamic; Gujarat
- Completed: Bijapur Sultanate
- Dome: Nine

Monument of National Importance
- Official name: Nav Gumbaz
- Reference no.: N-KA-D170

The Nav Gumbaz (literally "nine domes"), also called the Nau Gumbaz, is a mosque located in Bijapur, in the state of Karnataka, India. It was built during the reign of the Bijapur Sultanate.

The mosque structure is a Monument of National Importance.

== Description ==
The architectural features of the mosque, in particular, its multiple domes, are characteristic of the architectural style of Gujarat, as opposed to that of the Bijapur Sultanate. The nine domes of the mosque correspond with nine bays that the prayer hall is divided into. The central dome, as well as the four domes at the corners are segmental, while four intermediate domes have pyramidal vaults. A chhatri rises over the corners of the facade.

The facade has three arched entrances leading into the interior. A staircase runs along the southern wall of the mosque.

=== Interior ===
The interior is divided into nine bays by means of arches. The western wall of the mosque contains the mihrab, which is built out of polished black basalt, as well as Quranic inscriptions. A large inscription, which includes the Shia creed, is also present.

== See also ==
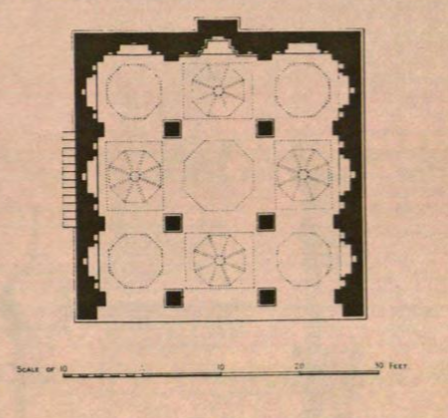
Plan of the Nav Gumbaz (west-up). The interior of the mosque is divided into nine bays, each corresponding with a dome.

- Islam in India
- List of mosques in India
