= Asundi =

- Village
- Country: India
- State: Karnataka
- District: Belgaum

Government
  - Type: Panchayat raj
  - Body: Gram panchayat

Languages
  - Official: Kannada
- Time zone: UTC+5:30 (IST)
- Postal code: 591126
- ISO 3166 code: IN-KA
- Vehicle registration: KA
- Website: karnataka.gov.in

Asundi is a village in Belgaum district in the southern state of Karnataka, India.

According to the 2011 census of India, it had a total area of 2071.6 hectares. Its population was 5161 spread over 1074 households. The village had 2 pre-primary schools and 2 primary schools.
