= Makkah Mosque, Chennai =

Mosque in Chennai, Tamil Nadu, India

Makkah Mosque
- Location of the mosque in Chennai

Religion
- Affiliation: Islam
- Ecclesiastical or organizational status: Mosque
- Leadership: Maulvi S.M.Taha Ahmed Kashibi (imam)
- Status: Active

Location
- Location: Anna Salai, Chennai, Tamil Nadu
- Country: India
- Interactive map of Makkah Mosque
- Coordinates: 13°03′30″N 80°09′06″E

Architecture
- Type: Mosque architecture
- Capacity: 5,000 worshippers

The Makkah Mosque is a mosque in the city of Chennai, India. The dargah of Syed Musa Sha Khaderi is located near the mosque. The masjid is located on Anna Salai. The five-storeyed mosque is one of the largest in India and can house 5,000 worshippers at a time.

== See also ==
- Islam in India
- List of mosques in India
