= Munavalli =

Munavalli Munoli
- Town
- Manoli
- Location in Karnataka, India Munavalli (India)
- Coordinates: 15.78°N 75.12°E
- Country: India
- State: Karnataka
- District: Belagavi
- Talukas: Saundatti

Government
  - Type: Panchayat Raj

Population (2011)
  - Total: 36,765
- Demonym: Munavalliga

Languages
  - Official: Kannada
- Time zone: UTC+5:30 (IST)
- Postal code: 591117
- Vehicle registration: KA 24

Munavalli is a town municipal council in Belagavi district, Karnataka. It has one famous Hindu temple called Panchalingeshwara that has been for a thousand years.

== Demographics ==
At the 2001 India census, Manolli had a population of 19897 with 10340 males and 9557 females.

== See also ==
- Belgaum
- Districts of Karnataka
