= Henry Cousens =

Scottish archeologist and photographer

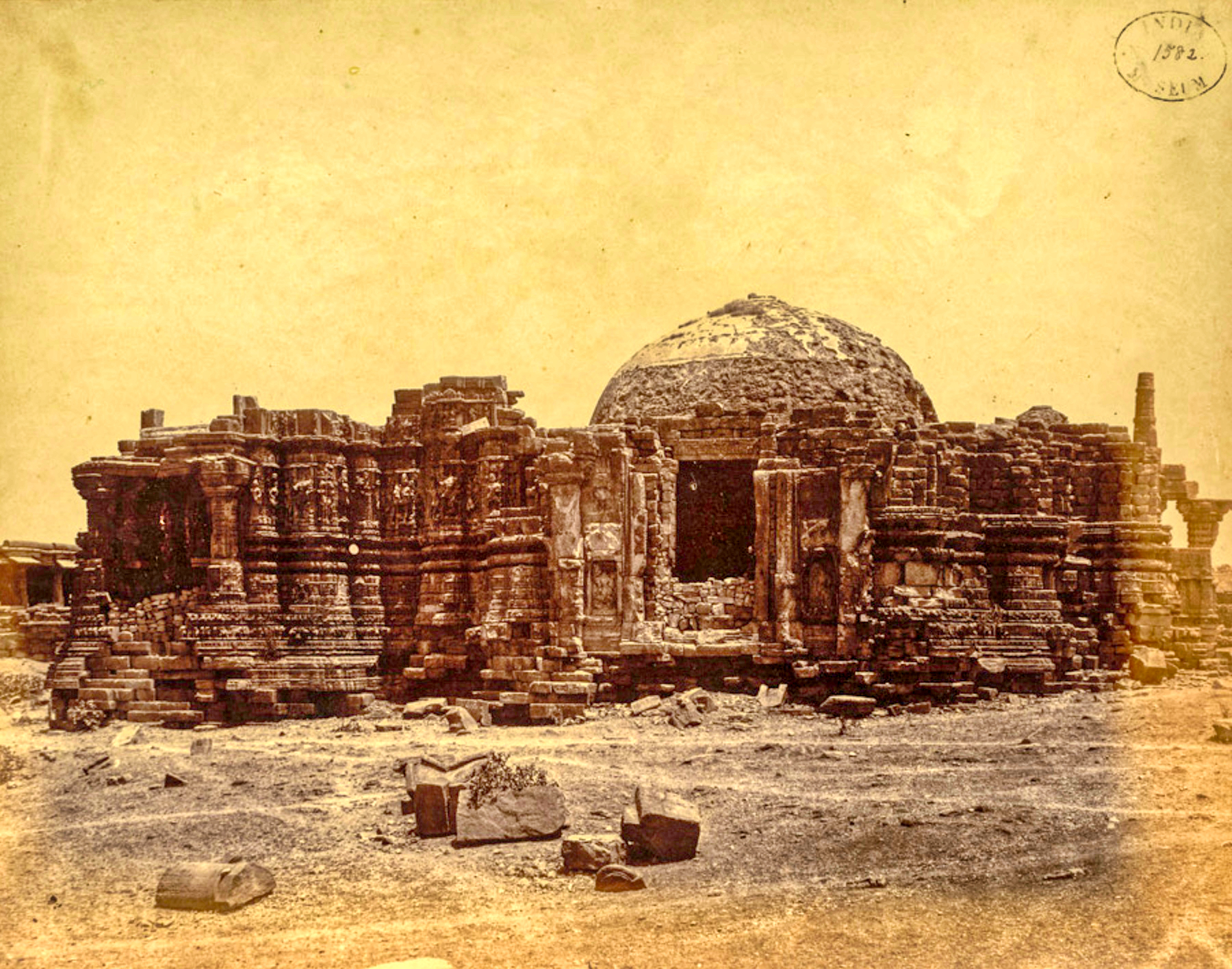
Photo by Cousens of the ruins of the Somnath Temple, 1869.

Henry Cousens (1854–1933) was a Scottish archaeologist and photographer known for his pioneering work among the monuments and antiquities in British India, particularly in regions that are now Western India and Southern Pakistan.

== Early life and career ==
He was born in 1854 to Margaret Fitzmaurice and Henry Cousens Sr, in Renfrewshire, Scotland, UK.

== Career ==
After his studies, he arrived in India and joined the Western division of the Archeological Survey of India in 1881. In 1891, he was promoted to the Superintendent post, where he served for nearly 20 years, retiring in 1910. With a team of artists and draftsmen, he visited remote archaeological and historic sites, surveyed the ruins and sites, and documented — with photographs — caves, temples, and other antiquarian sites.

== Reception ==
Cousens meticulous measurements, sketches, photographs and reports were in many cases the earliest reports of historic sites in these parts of India and Pakistan and brought them to the notice of wider scholarship within India, as well as Europe and the United States. His collaboration with James Burgess produced a series of publications, cited throughout the 20th and 21st century. These were praised as of high quality, "beautiful photographs of temples and mosques", and important contributions by his peers:

Henry Cousens’s Photographic Achievements

By the end of the nineteenth century, the importance of comprehensive visual documentation produced to rigorous standards was becoming recognized by a few farsighted individuals, most notably Henry Cousens in his work at the great Buddhist stupa at Sanchi, some 40 kilometers from Bhopal, in the Indian state of Madhya Pradesh. In order to photograph the extensive sculptural panels that adorn this World Heritage Site, Cousens built an elaborate wooden framework that allowed him to raise his camera parallel to each section and to photograph each individual relief without distortion and to a uniform scale. (A full description of his working method can be found in his Annual Report for 1900 [Cousens 1901].) This task, which took Cousens and his team of assistants over two months to complete and which resulted in a collection of over 250 large-format negatives, remains a model of its kind. It further illustrates the financial and time commitment required to produce fully satisfactory visual records of archaeological subjects. While such an approach has historically been the exception rather than the rule, it remains an enduring model of photography’s unique value as a tool of record in its comprehensive scale, carefully planned organization, and technical quality.

— John Falconer (2010)

According to John Marshall, Cousens' success at the Archeological department brought his team added responsibilities where the British India government sought to preserve the local heritage, its ancient monuments and further explore buried remains. Cousens effort helped clean up, restore and start this process of preserving India's heritage in Sindh, Gujarat, Maharashtra, Telangana, Andhra Pradesh and Karnataka.

== Bibliography ==
His publications include:

- The Antiquities of the Town of Dabhoi in North Gujarat (with J. Burgess)
- Bijapur, a Guide to its Ruins
- Notes on the Buildings and other Antiquarian Remains at Bijapur
- Lists of Antiquarian Remains in HH. the Nizam’s Territories (now part of Andhra Pradesh, Telangana, Maharastra and Karanataka)
- The Architectural Antiquities of Northern Gujarat (with J. Burgess)
- Portfolio of Illustrations of Sindh Tiles
- Bijapur and its Architectural Remains
- The Architectural Antiquities of Western India
- The Chalukyan Architecture of the Kanarese Districts
- The Antiquities of Sindh (now part of Pakistan)
- Medieval Temples of the Dakhan
- Somanatha and other Medieval Temples in Kathiawad
