= Bevoor =

- village
- Location in Karnataka, India Bevoor (India)
- Coordinates: 16.2084°N 75.8941°E
- Country: India
- State: Karnataka
- District: Bagalkot
- Talukas: Bagalkot

Government
  - Body: Gram panchayat

Population (2001)
  - Total: 5,356

Languages
  - Official: Kannada
- Time zone: UTC+5:30 (IST)
- ISO 3166 code: IN-KA
- Vehicle registration: KA
- Website: karnataka.gov.in

Bevoor is a village in the southern state of Karnataka, India. It is located in the Bagalkot taluk of Bagalkot district in Karnataka.

== Demographics ==
As of 2001 India census, Bevoor had a population of 5356 with 2698 males and 2658 females.
