= Ballari Nala =

River in India

Coordinates: 12°28′04″N 80°09′16″E

Bellary Nala

Physical characteristics
- Source
  - location: Yellur in Karnataka, India
  - elevation: 1010m
- Mouth
  - location: Markandeya river, near Karaguppi, Hukkeri, Karnataka, India
  - elevation: 650m
- Length: 36 mi (58 km)

Bellary Nala (or Ballari Nala) is a river of southern India. It rises in the Yellur in Belgaum Taluk of Karnataka state, flows towards South-eastern side of the Belagavi city and flows through Halga, Vadgaon, Shahapur, Bastwad, Basavan Kudchi, Angol, Mutga, Sambra, Muchandi, Sulebhavi Khangaon, Hudali, Suldhal, Malamaradi, Budihal, Ankalgi, Akkatangerahal, Kundargi and many villages before reaching its confluence into the Markandeya river at near Karaguppi in Hukkeri Taluk (2 kilometres (1.2 mi) from Pachapur Railway Station)

== Current State ==
During monsoon, Bellary Nala floods frequently that has been causing them huge losses for farmers the past. They have been demanding officials to desilt the nala. They have submitted memorandums to the authorities concerned and even protested against their alleged negligence. Also the nala has not been cleaned for sometime. The 30-km stretch of Bellary Nala traverses through dense industrial and populated clusters and agriculture farms before joining Markandeya river. The several industries and even hospitals release their waste into the nala. As a result, crops on the banks of the nala are damaged and to make things worse, many farmers working in those fields complain of skin diseases. Even the government sanctioned funds for taking up the nala work in 2017, but the work never commenced. Since Bellary Nala carries the Belagavi city's sewage throughout the year, it is also the duty of the Belgaum City Corporation to clean. However, the corporation says it is helpless and that it is up to the district administration to take care of it. This year as an addon, the making of the Halga - Macche bypass Road has worsened the situation.

== Dam ==
Government of Karnataka is constructing an irrigation dam across Bellary Nala. The Bellary nala irrigation project envisages to irrigate 8200 Hectares of land in Belgaum, Gokak, Saundatti & Bailahongal taluks of Belgaum district by constructing a dam across Bellary nala, which is a main tributary to Markandeya river. Excavation for dam foundation, concreting in block 1 to 6 and 8 to 18 are partly completed. Total length of main canal is 106 km, works in reach from km 44 to 106 are under progress. (Except km 1 to 10 & 32 to 40, which is under forest area)

== Belagavi Nala ==
Belagavi Nala is a tributary of Ballari Nala, which rises at Laxmi Tekdi in Belgaum city and converges near Laxminagar in the outskirts of Belgaum.

== See also ==
- Krishna Water Disputes Tribunal
- Markandeya river
- Krishna River
- Ghataprabha River
- Godchinamalaki Falls
