= Godachinamalaki =

- Village
- Location in Karnataka, India Godachinamalaki (India)
- Coordinates: 16°7′54.73″N 74°43′49.98″E
- Country: India
- State: Karnataka
- District: Belagavi
- Talukas: Gokak
- Elevation: 660 m (2,170 ft)

Languages
  - Official: Kannada
- Time zone: UTC+5:30 (IST)

Godachinamalaki is a village in Belagavi district in the southern state of Karnataka, India. It lies at an altitude of 660 metres (2,170 feet) above sea level.

== Godchinamalaki Falls ==
The village is famous for its proximity to Godchinamalaki Falls (near Gokak Falls on Ghataprabha River) on Markandeya river, before the Markandeya's confluence with the Ghataprabha River at Gokak.
