= Hanamapur =

Hanamapur may refer to any of the following villages in India:

- Hanamapur (557449), Gokak taluk, Belagavi district, Karnataka
- Hanamapur (557483), Gokak taluk, Belagavi district, Karnataka
- Hanamapur, Athni taluk, Belagavi district, Karnataka
- Hanamapur (S.U.), Ramdurg taluk, Belagavi district, Karnataka
- Hanamapur, Dharwad district, Karnataka
- Hanamapur, Haveri district, Karnataka
