= Belagavi Nala =

Coordinates: 12°28′04″N 80°09′16″E

Physical characteristics
- Source
  - location: Laxmi Tekdi, Belgaum, Karnataka, India
  - elevation: 760m
- Mouth
  - location: Bellary Nala, near Laxminagar, Belgaum, Karnataka, India
  - elevation: 740m
- Length: 10.5 km (6.5 mi)

Belagavi Nala is a river of southern India. It rises at Laxmi Tekdi in Belgaum city of Karnataka state, flows towards South-eastern side of the Belagavi city and flows through Camp, Station Road, Shastry Nagar, Shivaji Garden and Vishwakarmanagar right up to Old PB Road, before reaching its confluence into the Bellary Nala at Laxminagar in Belgaum.

== Current state ==
Nala, often termed in the context of sewage drain, has now become a reality of the people of Belagavi. The design proposal for Revitalisation project looks at a fundamental and a pragamatic solution of claiming back the water streams from these nalas and develop them into a green network which allows for pedestrian and bicycle connections, public greens and connected ecological corridors for reviewing the landscape of Belagavi.

== See also ==
- Krishna Water Disputes Tribunal
- Bellary Nala
- Markandeya river
- Krishna River
- Ghataprabha River
- Godchinamalaki Falls
