= Yellur =

Yellur may refer to,

- Yellur, Belgaum, a village in Belgaum district in Karnataka, India.
- Yellur, Udupi, a village in Udupi district in Karnataka, India.
- Yellur, Adilabad, a village in Adilabad district, Andhra Pradesh, India.
- Yellur, Mahbubnagar, a village in Mahbubnagar district, Andhra Pradesh, India.
