= Hunshyal =

Hunshyal may refer to:

- Hunshyal (P.G.), a village in Karnataka, India
- Hunshyal (P.Y.), a village in Karnataka, India
