= Bad, Karnataka =

Bad
- Village
- Country: India
- State: Karnataka
- District: Belgaum
- Talukas: Hukeri

Government
  - Type: Panchayat raj
  - Body: Gram panchayat

Languages
  - Official: Kannada
- Time zone: UTC+5:30 (IST)
- ISO 3166 code: IN-KA
- Vehicle registration: KA

Bad is a village in Belgaum district in the southern state of Karnataka, India.

Karnataka is the second-largest milk-producing state in India, after Gujarat. During the COVID-19 pandemic, state-run dairy behemoth Karnataka Milk Federation (KMF) collection centres at many villages stopped functioning due to a huge drop in demand. Local milk producers who survived on selling milk to the KMF resorted to dumping thousands of litres into tanks, lakes and even rivers.

The current air quality in Bad is listed as poor. "The air has reached a high level of pollution and is unhealthy for sensitive groups. Reduce time spent outside if you are feeling symptoms such as difficulty breathing or throat irritation."
