= Zangatihal =

- Village
- Location in Karnataka, India Zangatihal (India)
- Coordinates: 16°11′9.57″N 74°33′52.39″E
- Country: India
- State: Karnataka
- District: Belgaum
- Talukas: Hukeri

Languages
  - Official: Kannada
- Time zone: UTC+5:30 (IST)

Zangatihal is a village in Belgaum district in the northern state of Karnataka, India.
