= Duradundi =

- Village
- Location in Karnataka, India Duradundi (India)
- Coordinates: 16.14°N 74.81°E
- Country: India
- State: Karnataka
- District: Belgaum
- Talukas: Gokak

Population (2001)
  - Total: 7,271

Languages
  - Official: Kannada
- Time zone: UTC+5:30 (IST)

Duradundi is a village in the southern state of Karnataka, India. It is located in the Gokak taluk of Belagavi district in Karnataka. Duradundi is run by an elected official, Head of Village or Sarpanch.

== Demographics ==
In 2011 India census, Duradundi had a population of 7613. It consists of 3776 males and 3837 females, and 1212 minors from 0-6.

== See also ==
- Belgaum
- Districts of Karnataka
