= Mallapur (P.G.) =

Village in Karnataka, India

- Village
- Location in Karnataka, India Mallapur (P.G.) (India)
- Coordinates: 16.14°N 74.81°E
- Country: India
- State: Karnataka
- District: Belgaum
- Talukas: Gokak

Population (2001)
  - Total: 12,786

Languages
  - Official: Kannada
- Time zone: UTC+5:30 (IST)

Mallapur (P.G.) is a village in the southern state of Karnataka, India. It is located in the Gokak taluk of Belagavi district in Karnataka.

== Demographics ==
At the 2011 India census, Mallapur (P.G.) had a population of 16062 with 8075 males and 7987 females.

== See also ==
- Belgaum
- Districts of Karnataka
