= Patagundi =

- Village
- Country: India
- State: Karnataka
- District: Belagavi
- Talukas: Gokak

Languages
  - Official: Kannada
- Time zone: UTC+5:30 (IST)

Patagundi is a village in Belagavi district of Karnataka, India. Patagundi is situated in the banks of river Gataprabha. The place is famous for Anjaneya and Jadi Siddeshwara temple.and ಇಲ್ಲಿನ ಅನೇಕ ಜನರು ಆಂಜನೇಯನನ್ನು ಪಟಗುಂದೇಶ್ವರನೆಂದು ಕರೆಯುತ್ತಾರೆ,ಈ ಪಟಗುಂದೇಶ್ವರನಿಗೆ ಸಕ್ಕರೆ ನೈವೇದ್ಯ ತುಂಬಾ ಇಷ್ಟವಂತೆ,ಇಲ್ಲಿಗೆ ರಾಜ್ಯದ ಮೂಲೆಮೂಲೆಗಳಿಂದ ಅನೇಕ ಭಕ್ತರು ಬಂದು ಅವರ ಹರಕೆಯನ್ವು ತೀರಿಸುತ್ತಾರೆ,ಹಾಗೂ ಪಟಗುಂದೇಶ್ವವರನು ಭಕ್ತರು ಕೇಳಿದ ವರಗಳನ್ನು ಬೇಗನೆ ಈಡೇರಿಸುತ್ತಾನೆ ಎಂಬುದು ಇಲ್ಲಿನ ಜನರ ಅಪಾರವಾದ ನಂಬಿಕೆ Main agriculture crops are Sugarcane, Maize and vegetables.
