= Mastiholi =

- Village
- Location in Karnataka, India Mastiholi (India)
- Coordinates: 16°05′N 74°33′E
- Country: India
- State: Karnataka
- District: Belgaum
- Talukas: Hukeri

Languages
  - Official: Kannada
- Time zone: UTC+5:30 (IST)

Mastiholi is a village in Belgaum district of Karnataka, India.
