= Rashing =

- Village
- Country: India
- State: Karnataka
- District: Belgaum
- Talukas: Hukeri

Languages
  - Official: Kannada
- Time zone: UTC+5:30 (IST)

Rashing is a small village in Belgaum district of Karnataka state, India.

It is located at Karnataka and Maharashtra border.
