= Kamaladinni =

Coordinates: 16°20′N 76°48′E

- Village
- Interactive map of Kamaladinni
- Country: India
- State: Karnataka
- District: Belagavi
- Talukas: Gokak

Languages
  - Official: Kannada
- Time zone: UTC+5:30 (IST)

Kamaladinni is a village in Belagavi district in Karnataka, India. having one govt primary school and other aided mahatma Gandhi school in kamaladinni
