= Madamakkanal =

- Village
- Country: India
- State: Karnataka
- District: Belagavi
- Talukas: Hukkeri

Languages
  - Official: Kannada
- Time zone: UTC+5:30 (IST)

Madamakkanal is a village in Belagavi district in Karnataka, India.
