= Shirhatti (Kh) =

Coordinates: 15.2313°N 75.5772°E

Shirhatti (Kh) Shirhatti Khurd
- Village
- Interactive map of Shirhatti (Kh)
- Country: India
- State: Karnataka
- District: Belgaum
- Talukas: Hukeri

Government
  - Type: Panchayat raj

Languages
  - Official: Kannada
- Time zone: UTC+5:30 (IST)

Shirhatti (Kh) is a village in Belgaum district of Karnataka, India.
