= Shirhatti (Bk) =

Shirhatti (Bk) Shirhatti Budruk
- Village
- Country: India
- State: Karnataka
- District: Belgaum
- Talukas: Hukeri

Languages
  - Official: Kannada
- Time zone: UTC+5:30 (IST)

Shirhatti (Bk) is a village in Belgaum district of Karnataka, India.
