= Molmanatti =

- Village
- Country: India
- State: Karnataka
- District: Belagavi
- Talukas: Gokak

Languages
  - Official: Kannada
- Time zone: UTC+5:30 (IST)

Molmanatti is a village in Belagavi district of Karnataka, India.

== Demographics ==
Per the 2011 Census of India, Molmanatti has a total population of 4345; of whom 2167 are male and 2178 female.
