= Ankale =

Ankale Ankali
- Village
- Country: India
- State: Karnataka
- District: Belgaum
- Talukas: Hukkeri

Population (2001)
  - Total: 1,500

Languages
  - Official: Kannada
- Time zone: UTC+5:30 (IST)
- PIN: 591313
- Nearest city: Sankeshwar

Ankale is a village in Hukkeri Taluk, Belgaum district in the southern state of Karnataka, India.
