= Kot, Karnataka =

Kot
- Village
- Country: India
- State: Karnataka
- District: Belgaum
- Talukas: Hukeri

Government
  - Type: Panchayat raj
  - Body: Gram panchayat

Languages
  - Official: Kannada
- Time zone: UTC+5:30 (IST)
- ISO 3166 code: IN-KA
- Vehicle registration: KA
- Website: karnataka.gov.in

Kot is a village in Belgaum district in Karnataka, India.
