= Ramewadi =

Daddi-Ramewadidi
- Town
- Nickname: Daddi-Ramewadi
- Location in Karnataka, India Daddi-Ramewadidi (India)
- Coordinates: 16°02′N 74°21′E
- Country: India
- State: Karnataka
- District: Belgaum
- Talukas: Hukeri

Population (2021)
  - Total: 16,079
- Demonym: NAVU DADDI MANDI

Languages
  - Official: Kannada, MARATHI
- Time zone: UTC+5:30 (IST)

Daddi-Ramewadidi, also known as Daddi-Ramewadi or simply Ramewadi, is the largest section of Daddi, a town in the Belgaum district of Karnataka, India.

Ramewadi has a famous domestic animal market, held weekly on Monday.

Daddi is well connected to Belgaum by roads. Other nearby cities include Kolhapur, Gadhinglaj, Ajara, Sankeshwar, Nipani, Gokak and Hukkeri.
