= Jinaral =

- Village
- Location in Karnataka, India
- Coordinates: 16°07′32″N 74°33′17″E
- Country: India
- State: Karnataka
- District: Belgaum
- Talukas: Hukeri

Languages
  - Official: Kannada
- Time zone: UTC+5:30 (IST)

Jinaral is a village in Belgaum district in the southern state of Karnataka, India.
