= Awargol =

- Village
- Country: India
- State: Karnataka
- District: Belgaum
- Talukas: Hukeri

Languages
  - Official: Kannada
- Time zone: UTC+5:30 (IST)

Awargol is a village in Belgaum district in the southern state of Karnataka, India. The village has population of 3242 people. It is located 44 KM towards North from District head quarters Belgaum. 565 KM from State capital Bangalore.
