= Kallolli =

Kalloli
- Village
- Location in Karnataka, India Kalloli (India)
- Coordinates: 16.14°N 74.81°E
- Country: India
- State: Karnataka
- District: Belgaum
- Talukas: Gokak

Population (2016)
  - Total: 16,500

Languages
  - Official: Kannada
- Time zone: UTC+5:30 (IST)
- PIN: 591224

Kalloli is a village in the southern state of Karnataka, India. It is located in the Gokak taluk of Belagavi district in Karnataka. The village has a famous Hanuman temple attracting devotees from Karnataka and Maharashtra.

== Demographics ==
As of 2011 India census, Kalloli had a population of 16000 with 8300 males and 7700 females.

== See also ==
- Belgaum
- Districts of Karnataka
- Shri Ramlingeshwar education society's
- Shri Basaveshwar education society's
- PJN high school
