= Midakanatti =

- Village
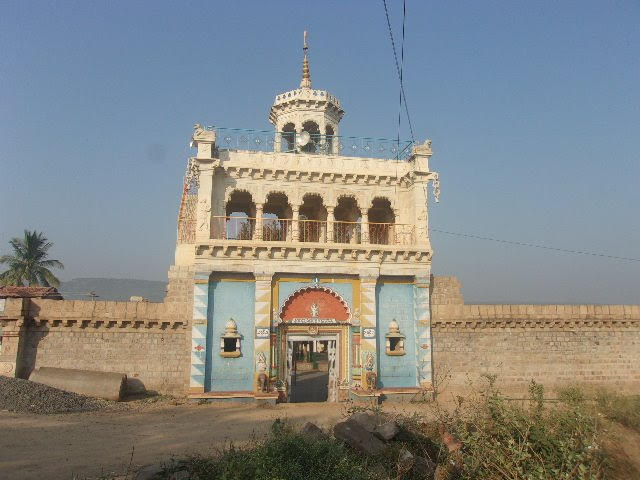
- Ramasiddeshwar Temple
- Country: India
- State: Karnataka
- District: Belagavi
- Taluk: Gokak

Government
  - Body: Gram panchayat

Population (2011)
  - Total: 2,165

Languages
  - Official: Kannada
- Time zone: UTC+5:30 (IST)
- Pin code: 591344
- Telephone code: 08332
- Vehicle registration: KA-49

Midakanatti is a village in Gokak, a taluk in Belagavi District of Karnataka State in India. It is administered by the Midakanatti Panchayat (village council). It is located 52 km east of the divisional headquarters in Belagavi, 25 km from the town of Gokak, and 507 km from the state capital, Bengaluru.

== Gallery ==
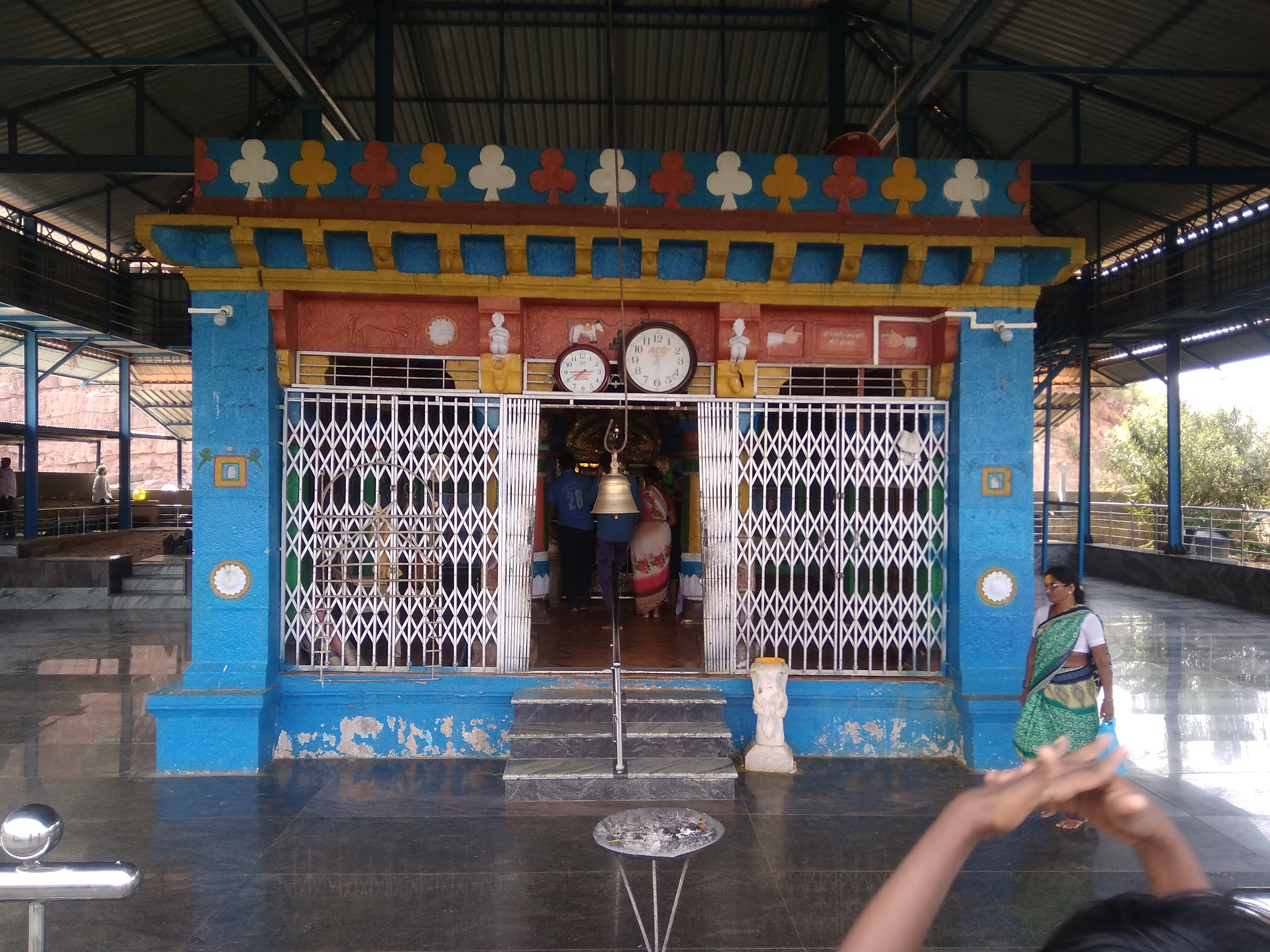
Shri Halasiddeshwar Temple

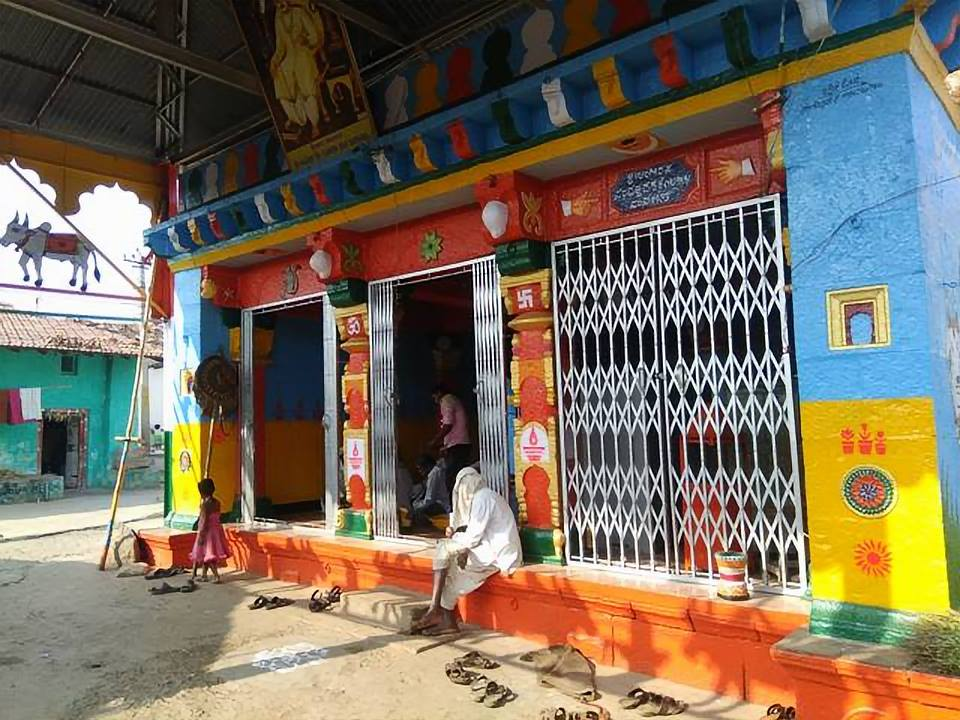
Shri Basaveshwar Temple

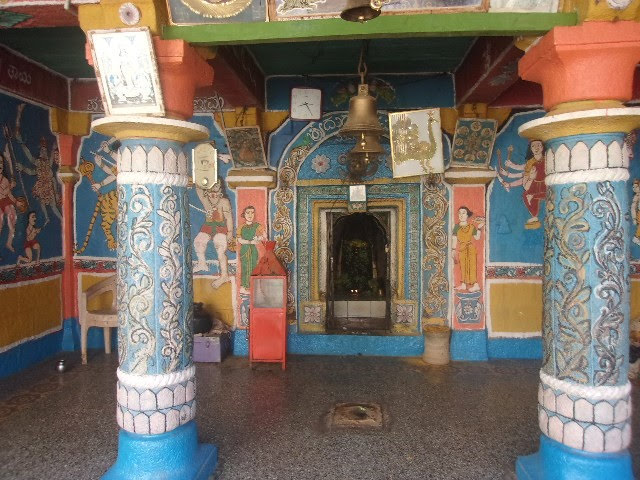
Mata Durga Devi Temple

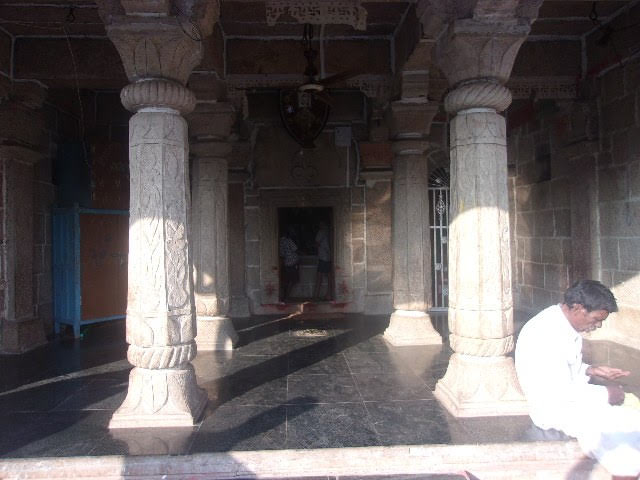
Mata Yallamma Devi Temple

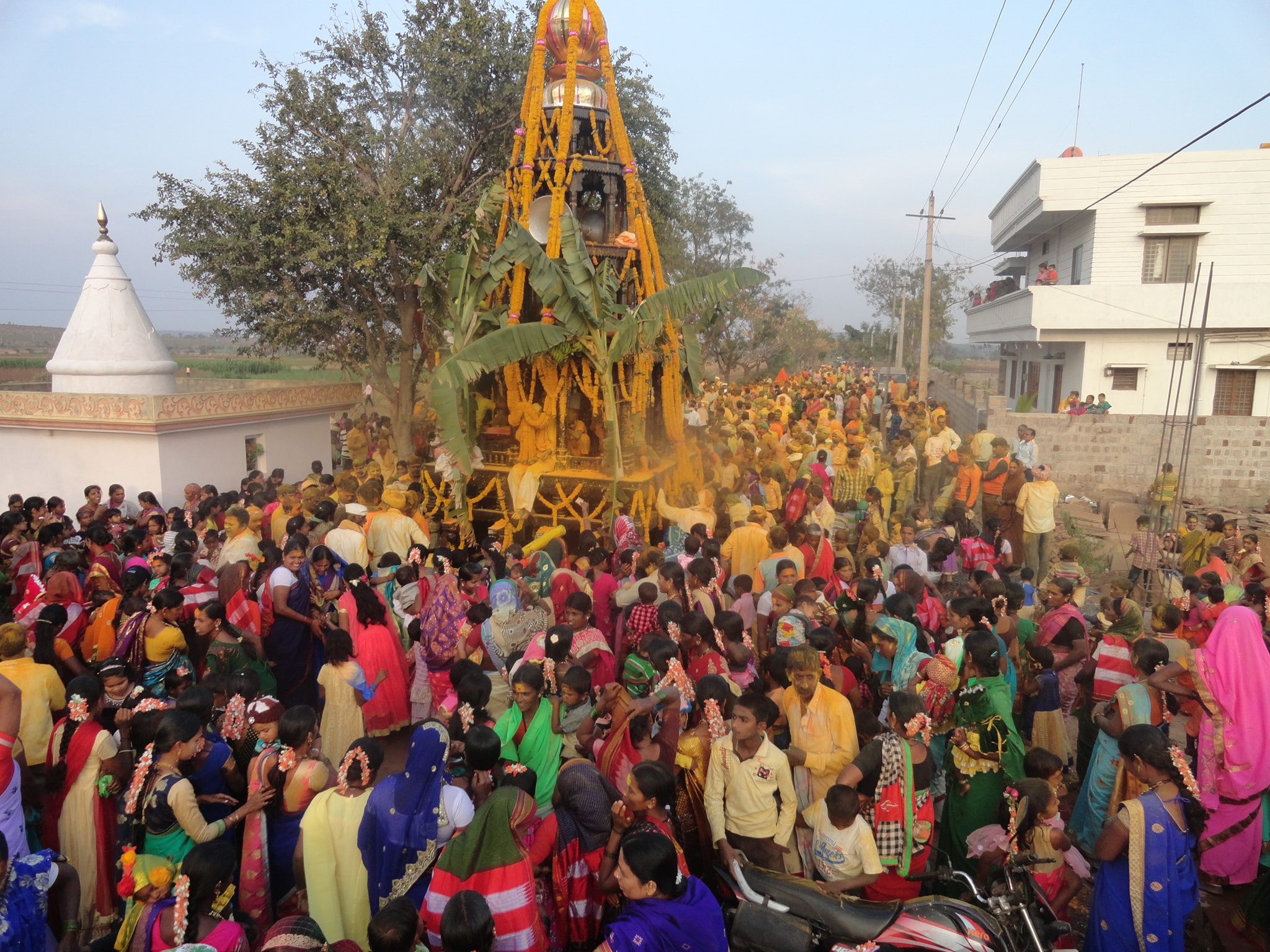
Mahashivratri Festival Rathotsava Midakanatti
