= Pamaladinni =

- Village
- Location in Karnataka, India Pamaladinni (India)
- Coordinates: 16°16′53″N 74°46′41″E
- Country: India
- State: Karnataka
- District: Belgaum
- Talukas: Gokak

Population (2001)
  - Total: 7,062

Languages
  - Official: Kannada
- Time zone: UTC+5:30 (IST)

Pamaladinni is a village in the southern state of Karnataka, India. It is located in the Gokak taluk of Belagavi district in Karnataka.

== Demographics ==
As of 2001 India census, Pamaladinni had a population of 7062 with 3652 males and 3410 females.

== See also ==
- Belgaum
- Districts of Karnataka
