= Hulloli =

- Village
- Location in Karnataka, India Hulloli (India)
- Coordinates: 16°16′N 74°40′E
- Country: India
- State: Karnataka
- District: Belgaum
- Talukas: Hukeri

Languages
  - Official: Kannada
- Time zone: UTC+5:30 (IST)

Hulloli is a village which comes under Hukkeri Taluka in Belgaum district in the southern state of Karnataka, India.

Hulloli has a Government Primary School and a Government High School and hygiene 30-bed Government Hospital. The village has connectivity with other small towns: Hukkeri 7 km and Chickodi 20 km, Gokak 20 km, Belagavi 58 km. For train availability there is a railway station called Ghataprabha (GPB) only 11 km distance from Hulloli.

Its called a high literacy rate village in the Hukkeri Taluka. It has multiple banks and Temples.

Hulloli has water source connection from the river called Ghataprabha.
