= Upparatti =

- Village
- Country: India
- State: Karnataka
- District: Belagavi
- Talukas: Gokak

Languages
  - Official: Kannada
- Time zone: UTC+5:30 (IST)

Upparatti is a village of Gokak taluk in the Belagavi district of Karnataka, southern India.
