= Tavag =

- Village
- Location in Karnataka, India Tavag (India)
- Coordinates: 16.14°N 74.81°E
- Country: India
- State: Karnataka
- District: Belgaum
- Talukas: Gokak

Population (2001)
  - Total: 5,682

Languages
  - Official: Kannada
- Time zone: UTC+5:30 (IST)
- ISO 3166 code: IN-KA

Tavag is a village in the southern state of Karnataka, India. It is located in the Gokak taluk of Belagavi district in Karnataka.

== Demographics ==
At the 2001 India census, Tavag had a population of 5682 with 2929 males and 2753 females.

== See also ==
- Belgaum
- Districts of Karnataka
