= Benachinamaradi =

- Village
- Location in Karnataka, India Benachinamaradi (India)
- Coordinates: 16.14°N 74.81°E
- Country: India
- State: Karnataka
- District: Belgaum
- Talukas: Gokak

Government
  - Type: Panchayat raj

Population (2001)
  - Total: 5,115

Languages
  - Official: Kannada
- Time zone: UTC+5:30 (IST)

Benachinamaradi is a village in the southern state of Karnataka, India. It is located in the Gokak taluk of Belagavi district in Karnataka.

== Demographics ==
At the 2001 India census, Benachinamaradi had a population of 5115 with 2662 males and 2453 females.

== See also ==
- Belgaum
- Districts of Karnataka
