= Gotur, Belgaum =

Gotur
- Village
- Location in Karnataka, India Gotur (India)
- Coordinates: 17°22′N 77°06′E
- Country: India
- State: Karnataka
- District: Belagavi
- Talukas: hukkeri

Languages
  - Official: Kannada
- Time zone: UTC+5:30 (IST)

Gotur is a village in Belagavi district in the northern state of Karnataka, India.
