= Bellanki =

Coordinates: 16.0915°N 74.4129°E

- Village
- Interactive map of Bellanki
- Country: India
- State: Karnataka
- District: Belgaum
- Talukas: Hukeri

Languages
  - Official: Kannada
- Time zone: UTC+5:30 (IST)

Bellanki is a village in Belgaum district in the southern state of Karnataka, India.
