= Dhupadal =

- Village
- Location in Karnataka, India Dhupadal (India)
- Coordinates: 16.14°N 74.81°E
- Country: India
- State: Karnataka
- District: Belgaum
- Talukas: Gokak

Population (2001)
  - Total: 9,658

Languages
  - Official: Kannada
- Time zone: UTC+5:30 (IST)

Dhupadal is a village in the southern state of Karnataka, India. It is located in the Gokak taluk of Belagavi district in Karnataka.

== Demographics ==
As of 2001 India census, Dhupadal had a population of 9658 with 4784 males and 4874 females.

== See also ==
- Belgaum
- Districts of Karnataka
