= Tapashi =

- Village
- Country: India
- State: Karnataka
- District: Belagavi
- Talukas: Gokak

Languages
  - Official: Kannada
- Time zone: UTC+5:30 (IST)
- PIN: 591 233

Tapashi is a village in Belagavi district of Karnataka, India. Specialty of this village is river has been flowing from east to west !
