= Nadigudiketra =

- Village
- Country: India
- State: Karnataka
- District: Belgaum
- Talukas: Hukeri

Government
  - Type: Panchayat raj

Languages
  - Official: Kannada
- Time zone: UTC+5:30 (IST)
- ISO 3166 code: IN-KA

Nadigudiketra is a village in Belgaum district of Karnataka, India. As of 2011, the population was 534. The village covers 339.59 hectares (839.1 acres).
