= Ankalgi =

Coordinates: 16°02′N 74°42′E

Ankalagi Kasaba Ankalagi Ankalagi
- Village
- Nickname: Adiveppana Ankalagi
- Interactive map of Ankalagi
- Country: India
- State: Karnataka
- District: Belagavi
- Talukas: Gokak

Population
  - Total: 20,000

Languages
  - Official: Kannada
- Time zone: UTC+5:30 (IST)
- PIN: 591101
- Nearest city: Belagavi (32 km)

Ankalagi is a village on the bank of the Ballari Nala River in Gokak taluk, Belagavi district of Karnataka state in southern India about 30 km from Belagavi and 30 km from Gokak.
