= Wantmuri =

- Village
- Location in Karnataka, India Wantmuri (India)
- Coordinates: 16°1′54.5″N 74°31′55.6″E
- Country: India
- State: Karnataka
- District: Belgaum
- Talukas: Hukeri

Languages
  - Official: Kannada
- Time zone: UTC+5:30 (IST)

Wantmuri is a village in Hukeri taluk of Belgaum district in the southern state of Karnataka, India.
