= Gurlapur =

- Village
- Location in Karnataka, India Gurlapur (India)
- Coordinates: 16°22′N 74°58′E
- Country: India
- State: Karnataka
- District: Belagavi
- Talukas: Gokak

Languages
  - Official: Kannada
- Time zone: UTC+5:30 (IST)

Gurlapur is a village in Belagavi district in the southern state of Karnataka, India.
