= Gulaganjikoppa =

- Village
- Country: India
- State: Karnataka
- District: Belagavi
- Talukas: Gokak

Languages
  - Official: Kannada
- Time zone: UTC+5:30 (IST)

Gulaganjikoppa is a village in Belagavi district in the southern state of Karnataka, India.

== Demographics ==
Per the 2011 Census of India, Gulaganjikoppa has a total population of 1468; 743 of whom are male and 725 female.
