= Melavanki =

- Village
- Location in Karnataka, India Melavanki (India)
- Coordinates: 16.14°N 74.81°E
- Country: India
- State: Karnataka
- District: Belgaum
- Talukas: Gokak

Population (2001)
  - Total: 6,154

Languages
  - Official: Kannada
- Time zone: UTC+5:30 (IST)

Melavanki is a village in the southern state of Karnataka, India. It is located in the Gokak taluk of Belagavi district in Karnataka.

== Demographics ==
At the 2001 India census, Melavanki had a population of 6154 with 3181 males and 2973 females.

== See also ==
- Belgaum
- Districts of Karnataka
