= Belvatti =

Village in Karnataka, India

- Village
- Country: India
- State: Karnataka
- District: Belgaum

Languages
  - Official: Kannada
- Time zone: UTC+5:30 (IST)
- Postal code: 591108
- Vehicle registration: KA 22

Belvatti (Marathi: बेळवट्टी ) is a small village situated on the banks of the river Markandeya in Belgaum district in the southern state of Karnataka, India. The village has a population of about 3000, and a voting population of around 1300.

The main source of income of people in Belvatti is agriculture. Sugarcane, sweet potatoes, poatoes, rice, cashew nuts, and corn are all farmed in the village.

Belvatti is situated on the borders of three states: Karnataka, Maharashtra, and Goa, so people in the village can talk in Kannada fluently.

Belvatti relocated in 1960 due to the construction of the Rakaskop dam on the river Markandeya.
