= Bairanatti =

- Village
- Country: India
- State: Karnataka
- District: Belagavi
- Talukas: Gokak

Languages
  - Official: Kannada
- Time zone: UTC+5:30 (IST)

Bairanatti is a village in Belagavi district in the southern state of Karnataka, India. It belongs to Belgaum division.

As of 2023, the Bairanatti population is estimated to be 627 total people, with 238 males and 389 females.
