= Panchanaikanatti =

- Village
- Country: India
- State: Karnataka
- District: Belagavi
- Talukas: Gokak

Government
  - Type: Village Panchayath

Languages
  - Official: Kannada
- Time zone: UTC+5:30 (IST)

Panchanaikanatti is a village in Belagavi district of Karnataka, India.

It is a small village with 30 households in old Panchanaikanatti. Most people residing in the village are from ST (Valmiki community) community, and then Vokkaligas.

The village is famous for Shri Mahalaxmi Temple and Shri Mahaganapati Temple.

The village is surrounded by Mamadapur, Ajjanakatti, and Chikkanandi.
