= Kuligod =

- Village
- Location in Karnataka, India Kuligod (India)
- Coordinates: 16.14°N 74.81°E
- Country: India
- State: Karnataka
- District: Belgaum
- Talukas: Mudalagi

Population (2001)
  - Total: 5,390

Languages
  - Official: Kannada
- Time zone: UTC+5:30 (IST)

Kuligod is a village in the southern state of Karnataka, India. It is located in the Gokak taluk of Belagavi district in Karnataka.

Kuligod / Parijatha Kulagoda is in Mudalgi Taluka of Belgaum District.

The famous folk art of North Karnataka "Shree Krishna Parijatha" was composed in Kuligod by the Famous Kuligod Thammanna in reference to his family god "Kulagodu Bhalabheema"”ಕುಲಗೋಡು ಬಲಭೀಮ ದೇವಸ್ಥಾನ” (A World Famous Hanuman temple still stands in Kuligod, where devotees come and worship Hanuman.

Many festivals are celebrated in the temple, mainly Karthika and ookali. Karthika starts from Deepavali and ends 3 months later, with big celebrations in the temple, annadhana, community gatherings, folk shows and mainly Shree Krishna Prajitha performed by famous folk artists. The show starts at 10pm and goes on till dawn. The show deals with Krishna and his wives, it has incredible oration skills and with lots of comedy.

== Demographics ==
As of 2001 India census, Kuligod had a population of 5390 with 2715 males and 2675 females.

== See also ==
- Belgaum
- Districts of Karnataka

Sri Krishna Parijatha was written by Kulgod Tammanna.
