= Salamwadi =

- Village
- Country: India
- State: Karnataka
- District: Belgaum
- Talukas: Hukeri

Population (2017)
  - Total: 3,000

Languages
  - Official: Marathi language
- Time zone: UTC+5:30 (IST)
- Postal code: 591254
- ISO 3166 code: IN-KA

On the bank of Ghataprabha river Salamwadi is a village in Belgaum district of Karnataka, India.
