= Yalimunoli =

- Village
- Location in Karnataka, India Yalimunoli (India)
- Coordinates: 16.29°N 74.60°E
- Country: India
- State: Karnataka
- District: Belgaum
- Talukas: Hukeri

Population (2001)
  - Total: 6,314

Languages
  - Official: Kannada
- Time zone: UTC+5:30 (IST)

Yalimunoli is a village in the southern state of Karnataka, India. It is located in the Hukeri taluk of Belgaum district in Karnataka.

== Demographics ==
As of 2001 India 2001 census of India, Yalimunoli had a population of 6314 with 3209 males and 3105 females.

== See also ==
- Belgaum
- Districts of Karnataka
