= Kalliguddi =

- Village
- Country: India
- State: Karnataka
- District: Belagavi
- Talukas: Gokak

Languages
  - Official: Kannada
- Time zone: UTC+5:30 (IST)
- Nearest city: Gokak
- Lok Sabha constituency: Belgaum
- Vidhan Sabha constituency: Arabhavi (Gokak East)

Kalliguddi is a village in Belagavi district in Karnataka, India. It is an agriculture- and horticulture-based village. The major crops are maize and also grapes. Historically this village is related in Jamakhandi Samsthan. In 1956 Karnataka state found that it comes under Gokak taluk. This is last village of gokak taluk. The village is well known for road facilities in this region.
