= Nabapur =

- Village
- Location in Karnataka, India Nabapur (India)
- Coordinates: 16.1667°N 74.8333°E
- Country: India
- State: Karnataka
- District: Belagavi
- Talukas: Gokak

Languages
  - Official: Kannada
- Time zone: UTC+5:30 (IST)

Nabapur is a village in Belagavi district of Karnataka, India.
