= Hagedal =

Coordinates: 16°05′N 76°07′E

- Village
- Interactive map of Hagedal
- Country: India
- State: Karnataka
- District: Belgaum
- Talukas: Hukeri

Languages
  - Official: Kannada
- Time zone: UTC+5:30 (IST)

Hagedal is a village in Belgaum district in the southern state of Karnataka, India.
