= Tukkanatti =

- Village
- Location in Karnataka, India Tukkanatti (India)
- Coordinates: 16.14°N 74.81°E
- Country: India
- State: Karnataka
- District: Belgaum
- Talukas: Gokak

Population (2001)
  - Total: 8,039

Languages
  - Official: Kannada
- Time zone: UTC+5:30 (IST)

Tukkanatti is a Village in the southern state of Karnataka, India. It is located in the Gokak taluk of Belagavi district in Karnataka.

== Demographics ==
As of 2001 India census, Tukkanatti had a population of 8039 with 4103 males and 3936 females.

== See also ==
- Belgaum
- Districts of Karnataka
