= Beerangaddi =

Beeranagaddi
- Village
- Nickname: beeranagaddi
- Country: India
- State: Karnataka
- District: Belagavi
- Founded by: Basaveshwar
- Talukas: Gokak

Government
  - Type: BJP

Languages
  - Official: Kannada
- Time zone: UTC+5:30 (IST)
- Postal code: 591218

Beeranagaddi is a village in Belagavi district in the southern state of Karnataka, India.
