= Appannagouda Patil =

Indian freedom fighter

Appannagouda Patil was a freedom fighter and prominent leader in the co-operative movement of Karnataka.

== Notable works ==
He was the reason behind establishment of The Hukeri Rural Electric Cooperative Society which came into existence on 31 July 1969.

== Recognition ==
His chair has been set up at Rani Channamma University, Belagavi in tribute to his contributions to the co-operative movement.

The Hukkeri Rural Electric Co-Operative Society which is India's first electric co-operative society runs a unit under his name that is involved in manufacturing of cement poles as an alternative to iron poles.
