= Hunshyal (P.G.) =

- Village
- Location in Karnataka, India Hunshyal (P.G.) (India)
- Coordinates: 16.14°N 74.81°E
- Country: India
- State: Karnataka
- District: Belgaum
- Talukas: mudalgi

Population (2001)
  - Total: 5,896

Languages
  - Official: Kannada
- Time zone: UTC+5:30 (IST)

Hunshyal (P.G.) is a village in the southern state of Karnataka, India. It is located in the Gokak taluk of Belagavi district in It has mallakamba or halokali in Shri veeranjaneya jatre .it comes in January or February month .ln every year 1st,2nd,3 January arranged a big jatra . this jatra belongs to Shri siddhalingeshwar &shambhavi Mata.

In this jatra arrangesThe satsang sammelana

ಇಲ್ಲಿ ಒಂದು ಶಾಸನ ದೊರೆತಿದ್ದು ಅದರ ಬಗ್ಗೆ ಯಾರೂ ಗಮನ ಹರಿಸಿಲ್ಲ. ಅದು ಅರೇಬಿಕ್ ಭಾಷೆ ಹೋಲುತ್ತದೆ.

ಊರ ಚಾವಡಿಯ ಪಕ್ಕದಲ್ಲಿದೆ.ಅದಕ್ಕೆ ಜನರೆಲ್ಲ ದೇವರೆಂದು ಹಾಲು ಹಾಕುತ್ತಾರೆ.

== Demographics ==
As of 2001 India census, Hunshyal (P.G.) had a population of 5896 with 2964 males and 2932 females.

== See also ==
- Belgaum
- Districts of Karnataka
