= Hukkeri Rural Electric Co-operative Society =

Electric society

The Hukkeri Rural Electric Co-operative Society Ltd
- Founded: July 21, 1969; 56 years ago
- Area served: Hukeri taluka
- Services: Purchase, Distribution and retail supply of Electricity
- Website: www.hrecs.com

Hukkeri Rural Electric Co-operative Society Ltd is India's first electric co-operative society, established on 21 July 1969 under the provisions of the Karnataka Co-operative Societies Act, 1959. The society also runs a unit which is involved in manufacturing cement poles (alternative to iron poles) under the name of late prominent co-operative leader in North Karnataka, Appannagouda Patil.
