= Ajjanakatti =

- Village
- Ajjanakatti, Gokak is in Belagavi district
- Country: India
- State: Karnataka
- District: Belgaum
- Talukas: Gokak

Government
  - Body: Village Panchayat

Languages
  - Official: Kannada
- Time zone: UTC+5:30 (IST)
- Nearest city: Belgaum
- Civic agency: Village Panchayat

Ajjanakatti, Gokak is a village in the southern state of Karnataka, India. It is located in the Gokak taluk of Belagavi district in Karnataka.

== See also ==
- Belgaum
- Districts of Karnataka
