= Ghataprabha =

- village
- Location in Karnataka, India Ghataprabha (India)
- Coordinates: 16.25°N 74.75°E
- Country: India
- State: Karnataka
- District: Belgaum
- Talukas: Gokak

Population (2001)
  - Total: 20,000

Languages
  - Official: Kannada
- Time zone: UTC+5:30 (IST)
- PIN: 591306
- Telephone code: 08332
- Nearest city: Gokak
- Lok Sabha constituency: Belgaum
- Vidhan Sabha constituency: Gokak
- Climate: Moderate (Köppen)

Ghataprabha is a village in the north of the Indian state of Karnataka. It is located in the Gokak taluk of Belgaum district in Karnataka.

== Demographics ==
As of the 2001 India census, Ghataprabha had a population of more than 80,000. There are two hospitals, KHI (Karnatak Health Institute) and JG Co-operative Hospital, which also has an Ayurvedic medical college.

There is reservoir built near Ghataprabha, across the Ghataprabha River, to store water for irrigation. The first stage of the reservoir construction project started in 1897 and comprised a 71 km-long left bank canal from the Dupdal weir, across the Ghataprabha River near Ghataprabha, into the Gokak Canal. It provided irrigation to an extent of 425,000 hectares. The second stage of the reservoir project comprised a left bank canal from Dupdal weir from 72 km to its full extent of 109 km across the Ghataprabha River near Hidkal, up to a height of 650.14 meters.

The Ghataprabha Reservoir has storage of about 659 million cubic meters, providing irrigation to 1,396,000 hectares of land, inclusive of the area under stage I. The third stage of the project included raising the Full Reservoir Level of to 662.94 meters. This would create gross storage of 1.448 billion cubic meters, channelised into a 202 km-long right bank canal and the 86 km-long Chickkodi Branch Canal. This would irrigate 191,386 hectares of land and bring the total area under the project to 3,310,000 hectares.

Ghataprabha is also known for its wholesale vegetable market. Vegetables from Ghataprabha are distributed not just across northern Karnataka, but also to various cities in Maharashtra and Goa.

== Bird sanctuary ==
Ghataprabha Bird Sanctuary is 29.78 square kilometres, and its boundaries enclose a stretch of about 28 km of the Ghataprabha River, including the reservoir resulting from the dam built near Dhupdhal. The sanctuary is known for migratory birds such as the demoiselle crane and European white stork. It is surrounded by agricultural fields. Between November and March is the best time to visit the sanctuary, when most of the migratory bird species nest there.

== Transportation ==
=== Rail ===
Ghataprabha railway station is situated on Pune–Miraj–Londa line being part of south western division, and is well connected by rail to major destinations such as Bangalore, Mysore, Mangalore, Pune, Mumbai, Hyderabad, Goa and Hubballi.

== See also ==
- Gokak
- Belgaum
- Districts of Karnataka
- India
