= Karadantu =

Indian delicacy

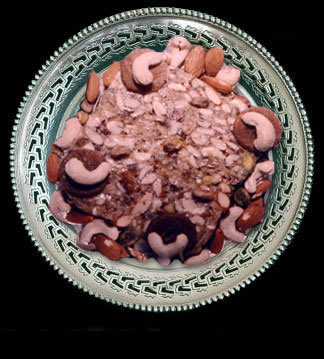
- Alternative names: Kardant
- Course: Dessert
- Place of origin: India
- Region or state: Karnataka
- Main ingredients: Edible gum, dried fruits, bengal gram flour, jaggery, marking-nut seeds

Karadantu (Kannada: ಕರದಂಟು) is a sweet delicacy unique to the state of Karnataka, India. Karadantu means fried-edible gum in the local language, Kannada. It is made of edible gum mixed with dry fruits and has a chewy texture. The other ingredients used in its preparation are fried bengal gram flour, jaggery and seeds of marking-nut (Semecarpus anacardium) tree. Gokak is very famous for karadant. Amingad town in Bagalkot district, Karnataka, is also famous for the karadantu produced in its sweet shops. The tastes of the 2 varieties of kardant are almost similar but never same courtesy the ingredients used. It has also been prominently made in the Kolhapur region of Maharashtra, especially in parts near Narsobawadi and Kurundwad.

== History ==
Karadantu was first invented by Vijaya Karadant in Karnataka in 1907 when jaggery was put on existing desserts.

== See also ==
- Cuisine of Karnataka
