= Hanamapur (557483) =

- Village
- Country: India
- State: Karnataka
- District: Belgaum
- Taluk: Gokak taluk

Languages
  - Official: Kannada
- Time zone: UTC+5:30 (IST)

Hanamapur is a village in Gokak taluk, Belgaum district in the southern state of Karnataka, India. As of the 2011 Census of India, it had a population of 512 people across 71 households.
