= Mahalingeshwara Temple, Gokak Falls =

Mahalingeshwara Temple
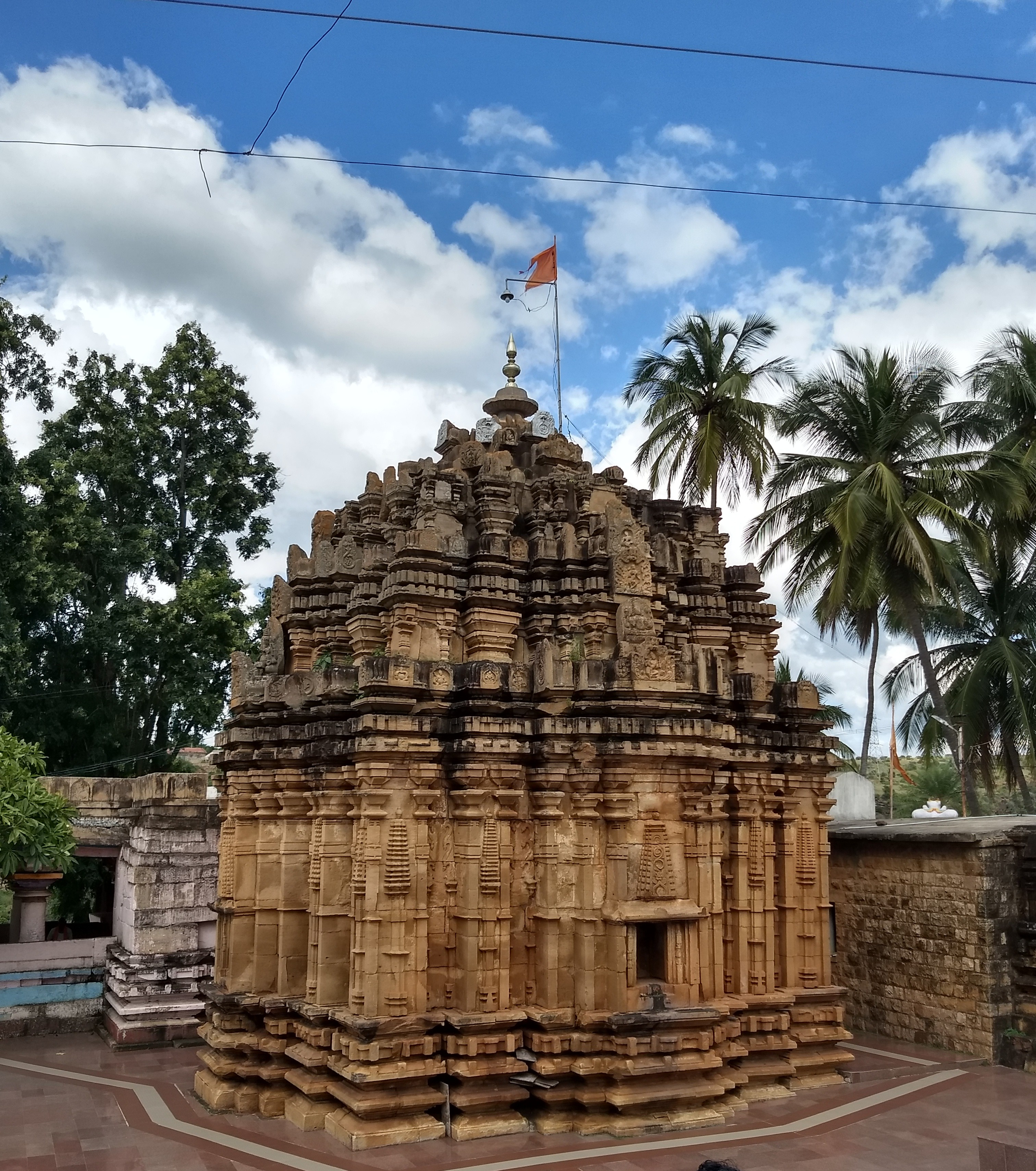

Religion
- Affiliation: Hinduism
- District: Belagavi district
- Deity: Shiva

Location
- State: Karnataka
- Country: India

Architecture
- Style: Kalyani Chalukyan

Mahalingeshwara Temple (mentioned as Tarakeshwar temple in an old inscription found inside the temple belonging to the reign of Ratta Kartaveerya III, dating back to 1153 AD) is an 11th-century Hindu temple dedicated to lord shiva. It is located at Gokak Falls, Belgaum. It has been built in Kalyani Chalukyan architectural style. It boasts of having a huge courtyard, an Ardhamandapa and a spacious open mukhamantapa(frontal courtyard) and a Garbhagriha(sanctum santorum) over which there exist a beautifully carved shrine.
