= Yellur, Nagarkurnool district =

Yellur
- Yellur in Telangana Yellur (India)
- Coordinates: 16.118718°N 78.345133°E
- Country: India
- State: Telangana
- District: Nagarkurnool district
- Mandal: Kollapur

Population
  - Total: 3,000
- Postal code: 509102
- ISO 3166 code: IN-TG
- Website: telangana.gov.in

Yellur, or Yeloor is a village located just 4 km (2.5 mi) away from the city of Kollapur in Nagarkurnool district of Telangana, India. Its total population is more than 3500.
