= Hudali =

Village in Karnataka, India

- Village
- Location in Karnataka, India Hudali (India)
- Coordinates: 15.88°N 74.56°E
- Country: India
- State: Karnataka
- District: Belgaum
- Talukas: Belgaum

Government
  - Type: congress

Population
  - Total: 20,000

Kannada
  - Official: Kannada
- Time zone: UTC+5:30 (IST)
- PIN -->: 591346

Hudali is a village in the southern state of Karnataka, India. It is located in the Belgaum taluk of Belgaum district in Karnataka.

== Demographics ==
As of 2001 India census, Hudali had a population of 15000 with 8230 males and 6770 females.

== See also ==
- Districts of Karnataka
