= Saundatti (Rural) =

Saundatti (urban)
- Taluk
- Location in Karnataka, India Saundatti (urban) (India)
- Coordinates: 15°47′N 75°07′E
- Country: India
- State: Karnataka
- District: Belgaum

Languages
  - Official: Kannada
- Time zone: UTC+5:30 (IST)

Saundatti is a taluk in Belgaum district of Karnataka, India.
