= Shahapur, Belgaum =

Shahapur
- Village
- Location in Karnataka, India Shahapur (India)
- Coordinates: 15.8475°N 74.5166°E
- Country: India
- State: Karnataka
- District: Belgaum
- Talukas: Belagavi

Languages
  - Official: Kannada
- Time zone: UTC+5:30 (IST)

Shahapur is a village in Belgaum district of Karnataka, India. It is now a suburb of Belgaum city.
