= Kundargi =

Coordinates: 14°48′N 74°53′E

Kundaragi
- Village
- Interactive map of Kundaragi
- Country: India
- State: Karnataka
- District: Belagavi district

Government
  - Type: gram panchayat

Population (2001)
  - Total: 4,000

Languages
  - Official: Kannada
- Time zone: UTC+5:30 (IST)
- Postal code: 591122

Kundargi is a village in Gokak taluk Belagavi district in Karnataka, India. beside the river Hedkal Dam.
