= Gokak Falls =

Waterfall in Karnataka, India

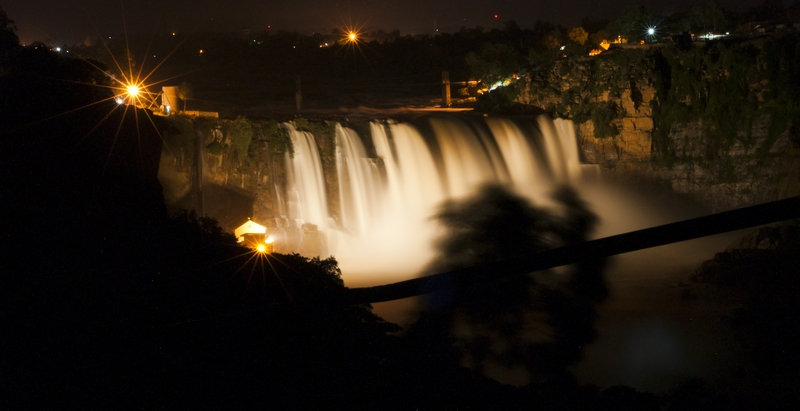
- Illuminated Gokak Falls

- Location within Karnataka
- Location: Gokak
- Coordinates: 16°11′30″N 74°46′35.4″E
- Type: Ledge Waterfall
- Total height: 52 m (171 ft)
- Number of drops: 1
- Longest drop: 52 m (171 ft)
- Average width: 177 m (581 ft)
- Watercourse: Ghataprabha River

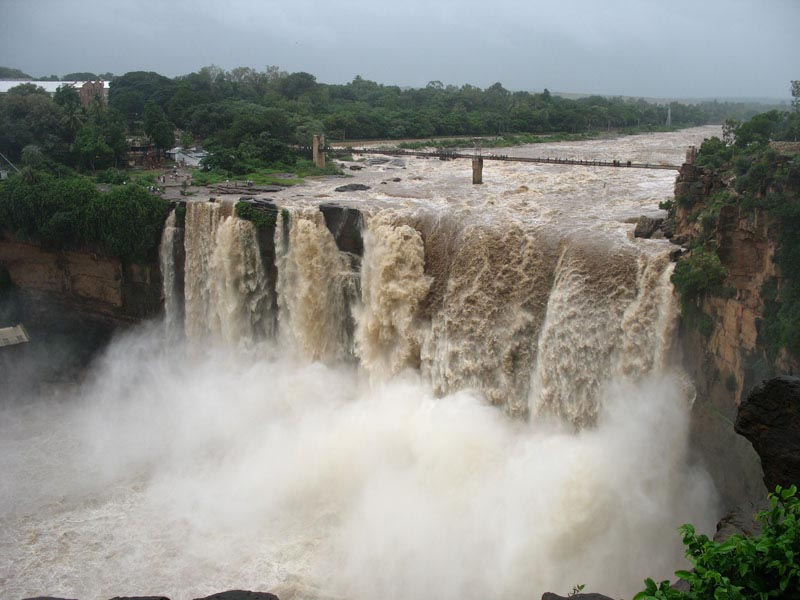
Gokak Falls

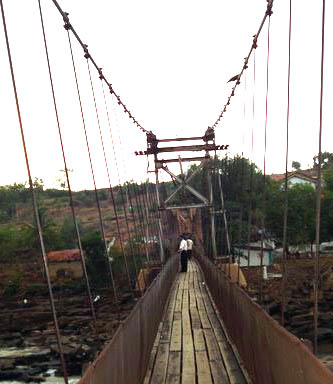
Bridge

The Gokak Falls is a waterfall located on the Ghataprabha River in Belagavi district of Karnataka, India. The waterfall is 6.5 kilometers away from Gokak town.

== About Gokak Water Falls ==
After a long, winding course, the Ghataprabha river falls 52 metres (171 ft) over the sandstone cliff amidst a picturesque gorge of a rugged valley. At the crest, the horseshoe-shaped waterfall has a flood breadth of 177 metres (581 ft). It also has a suspension bridge which is an attraction for people visiting Gokak.

== Nearby Cities ==
- Belagavi
- Sangli

== Nearby rail stations ==
- Ghataprabha railway station
- Belagavi railway station
- Gokak Road railway station
- Sangli railway station
- konnur Railway Station
- Pachhapur Railway Station

== See also ==
- List of waterfalls
- List of waterfalls in India
