= Yellur, Belgaum =

Yellur
- Village
- Yellur
- Location in Karnataka, India Yellur (India)
- Coordinates: 15°46′54″N 74°31′4″E
- Country: India
- State: Karnataka
- District: Belagavi

Language
  - Official: Kannada
- Time zone: UTC+5:30 (IST)

Yellur is a village and Gram panchayat in the Belagavi district, state of Karnataka, India. It is situated at the foot of a small hillock locally called Yellurgad (Rajhans Gad), 6 km (3.7 mi) to the south of the city of Belagavi. It is a village with multiple temples dedicated to Brahmalling, Kalmeshwar, Lakshmi, Dattatreya, Parameshwara, Hanuman and Changaleshwari. The jatra in honour of the goddess is held during Chaitra, when about 20,000 people participate.

== Overview ==
The village is surrounded by farms and fields, with rice as a major crop. A majority of the residents are farmers and construction laborers. Yellur has 3 government schools and 4 high schools. Most of the students go to the city of Belagavi for higher education.

== Yellur Fort ==
Yellurgad (Yellur Fort), located within the vicinity of Belagavi Taluka, stands on a hill with a scenic view. Its original name was Rajhunsgad, and was built by Beechiraja of Ratta dynasty in the 12th century. It is situated nearly 2500 ft (760 m) above sea level and served as a watchtower for Belgaum Fort to spot enemies approaching from long distances. Along with the Belgaum fort, its rulers have included the Rattas, Yadavas, Hoysalas, Bahamani, Adilshahi, and Marathas.

== Bellary Nala ==
Yellur is the birthplace of Bellary Nala River.
