= Markandeya River (Western Ghats) =

River in India

Physical characteristics
- Source
  - location: Bailur in Karnataka, India
  - coordinates: 15°44′30″N 74°21′04″E
  - elevation: 651m
- Mouth
  - location: Ghataprabha River, Gokak, Karnataka, India
  - coordinates: 16°10′22″N 74°48′38″E
  - elevation: 570m
- Length: 41.2 mi (66.3 km)

Markandeya is a river of southern India. It rises in the Bailur in Khanapur Taluk of Belgaum district, Karnataka state, enters Belagavi taluk on southern side and flows towards western side of the Belagavi city and flows 66 kilometres (41 mi) in Belgaum district forming beautiful Godchinamalaki Falls (near Gokak Falls) before reaching its confluence with the Ghataprabha River at Gokak about 60 kilometres (37 mi) from Belgaum.

== Current State ==
At present, the Markandeya is filled with silt and bushes have grown along the banks. Besides, hundreds of farmers have constructed wells within the riparian bed to irrigate their crops during the summer. The silt formation has resulted in reduction of water storage capacity. Around two decades ago, the 70-km long river would flow throughout the year, but now it has turned into a rivulet. At Kangrali, the river is around 30 feet wide and just around 8 feet deep. The rejuvenation had already started from Rakasakopp reservoir, from where the river gets excess spill. The 24-km long stretch passing through Belagundi, Bijagarni, Sulaga and Uchagaon to be rejuvenated. Also encroachment is one of the problem for rejuvenation.

== Dam ==
Government of Karnataka is constructing an irrigation dam across Markandeya river at Shirur, near Hukkeri. Catchment area of the dam will be 432 Sq. km. Gross storage to be 3.7 Thousand Million Cubic Feet (TMC). For the construction of this dam, 898 hectares of land were to be acquired, out of which 142 hectares were forest area and 756 hectares cultivable land. Total 9 Villages were submerged which led 2258 people to vacate their land.

== Bellary Nala ==
Bellary Nala is a tributary of Markandeya River, which converges near Karaguppi in Hukkeri Taluk (2 kilometres (1.2 mi) from Pachapur Railway Station) in Belgaum district.

== See also ==
- Krishna Water Disputes Tribunal
- Krishna River
- Ghataprabha River
- Godchinamalaki Falls
