= Godchinamalaki Falls =

Godachinmalki Falls
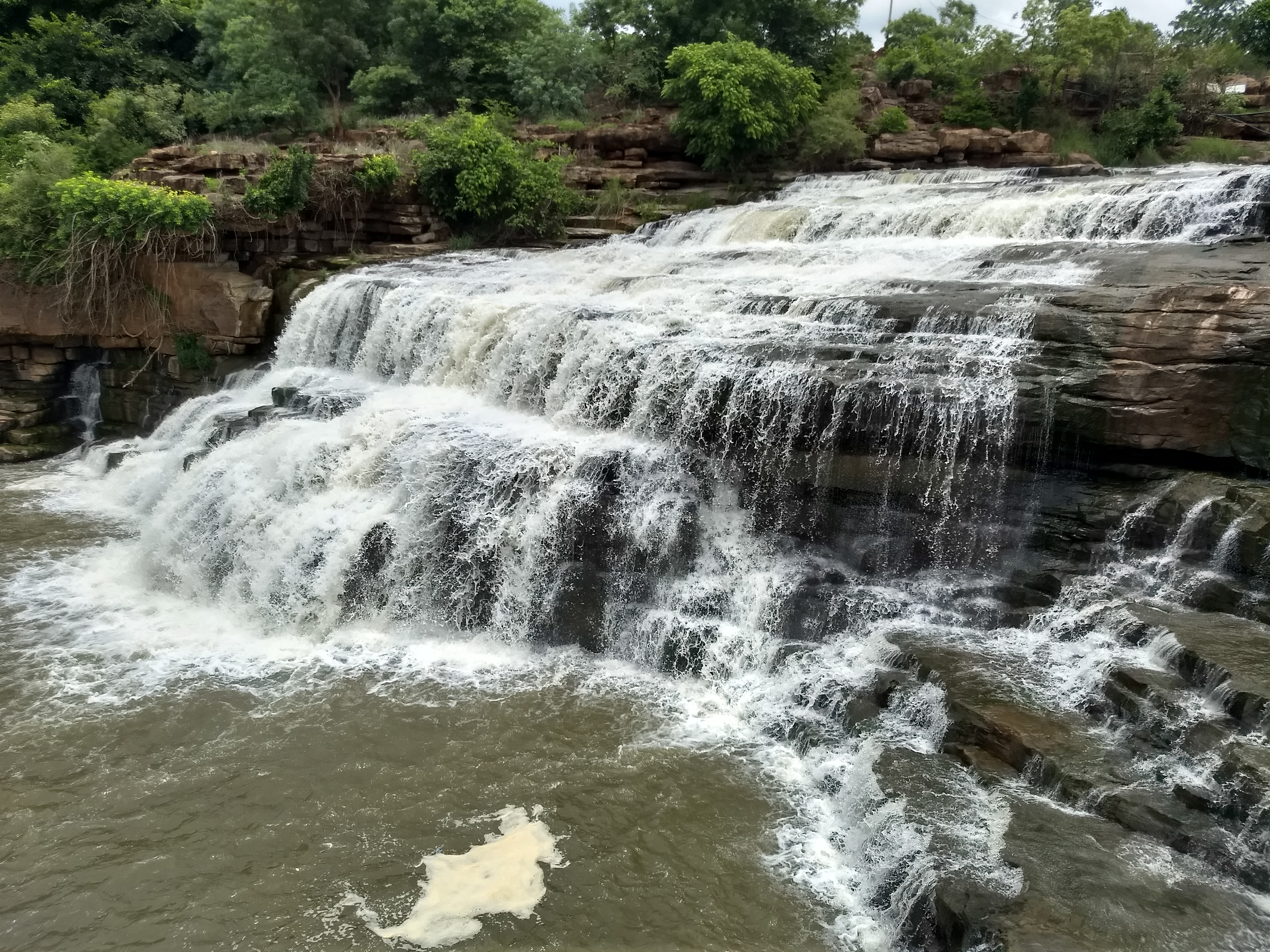

- Location within Karnataka
- Location: Godachinamalaki
- Coordinates: 16°7′54.73″N 74°43′49.98″E
- Type: Ledge Waterfall
- Total height: 45 m (148 ft)
- Number of drops: 2
- Longest drop: 25 m (82 ft)
- Watercourse: Markandeya river

Godachinamalaki Falls in Godachinamalaki village is a waterfall located on Markandeya river in Belagavi district, Gokak Taluk, Karnataka, India. It is 15 kilometers away from Gokak and 40 kilometers from Belgaum. It is located in a deep valley.

Godachinamalaki Falls, also known as Markandeya falls, is located in a rugged valley, which is approachable from Godachinamalaki village on foot or by vehicle through an irregular forest route for about 2 kilometers. There are two routes to reach the falls from Godachinamalki, one is via Malebail road by crossing a bridge at Godachinamalaki and the other is via Gurusiddeshwar Temple (Hatti Siddeshwar). It can also be reached on foot from Nirvaneshwara Matha near Yogikolla.

To reach Godachinamalki Falls from Belgaum via Ankalagi, Pachhapur & Mavanur, frequent bus service is available from Belgaum & Gokak. The nearest railway station, Pachhapur, is about 8 kilometers away. Good train connections are available from Belgaum to Miraj and almost all these trains stop at Pachhapur railway station.

There are actually two falls formed here. The Markandeya river takes a first fall from a height of about 25 metres and flows into a rocky valley. After a short distance from the rocky valley, it takes the second fall from a height of about 20 metres.

Gokak Falls is 10 km from Godachinamalki, via Melmanahatti & Maradimath.

Later, Markandeya river joins the Ghataprabha River near Gokak.

Within a 6 km radius there are two dams; one built across the Ghataprabha River (Hidkal dam) and another (Shirur Dam) across the Markandeya river. The best time to visit these places is from June to September

== See also ==
- List of waterfalls
- List of waterfalls in India
