= Ghataprabha River =

River in southern India

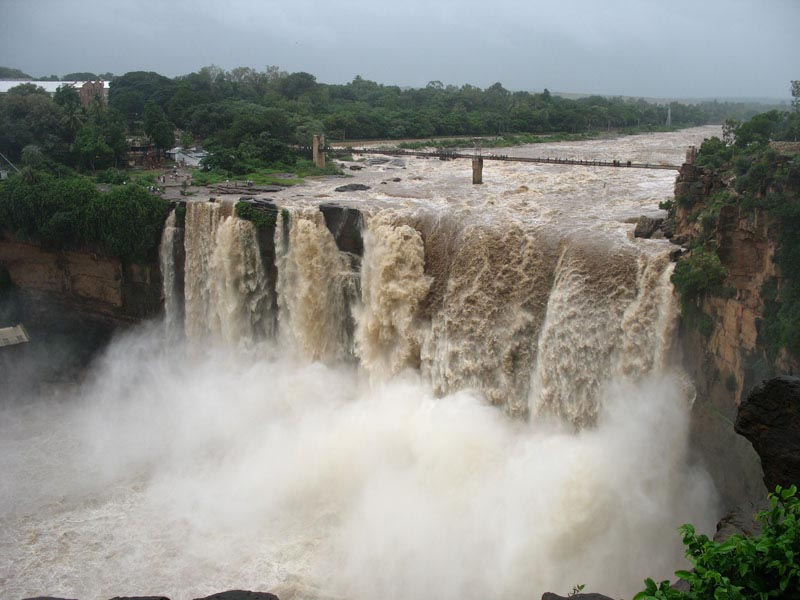
- Gokak Falls on River Ghataprabha

Location
- Country: India

Physical characteristics
- Source
  - location: Phatakwadi Lake, MH
  - elevation: 750 metres (2,460 ft)
- Mouth
  - location: Lal Bahadur Shastri Dam
- Length: 283 km (176 mi)

The Ghataprabha river in India is a tributary of the Krishna River that flows eastward for a distance of 283 kilometers before its confluence with the Krishna River at Chikksangam. The river basin is 8,829 square kilometers wide and stretches across Maharashtra and Karnataka states. The Markandeya, Hiranyakeshi and Tamraparni are tributaries of the Ghataprabha River.

The source of the river can be identified from Phatakwadi Lake 15.939335°N 74.059535°E, at an elevation of 750 metres above mean sea level.

== Bridges ==
The river is crossed by a suspension bridge near the Gokak Falls. The bridge whose construction started in the late 1800s was completed in 1907.

== Tributaries ==
The Markandeya, Hiranyakeshi & Tamraparni. rivers are tributaries of the Ghataprabha.

=== Dams ===
Hidkal Dam with a capacity of 51Tmcft is built across the river in Belagavi district.
