= Hukeri =

Hukkeri
- Town
- Location in Karnataka, India
- Coordinates: 16.23°N 74.6°E
- Country: India
- State: Karnataka
- District: Belgavi

Area
  - Total: 7.71 km^{2} (2.98 sq mi)
- Elevation: 631 m (2,070 ft)

Population (2011)
  - Total: 25,014
  - Density: 3,240/km^{2} (8,400/sq mi)

Languages
  - Official: Kannada
- Time zone: UTC+5:30 (IST)
- PIN: 591309
- Telephone code: 08333
- Vehicle registration: KA-49
- Website: www.hukkeritown.mrc.gov.in

Hukkeri is a Town Municipal Council and taluka in Belgavi district in the Indian state of Karnataka.

== Geography ==
Hukkeri is located at 16.23°N 74.6°E.

Hukkeri is a Town Municipal Council and a taluka in Belgaum district of Karnataka state. It is 50 km north of Belgaum. Hukkeri taluka shares its borders with Chikkodi in the north, Gokak in the east, Belgaum taluk in the south and the Maharashtra state in the west. The area of Hukkeri taluka is 987 km^{2} and according to the 2011 census, the population in Hukkeri taluk is 399,270. The study area has an overall population density of 405 persons per km^{2}. The decadal variation in population from 2001-2011 is 11.78% in Hukkeri taluk. The average annual rainfall is 422mm.

== Climate ==
Hukkeri taluk has a Tropical savanna climate. The area falls under Northern transitional agro-climatic zone of Karnataka state and is categorized as drought prone. The normal annual rainfall in Hukkeri taluk for the period 1981 to 2010 is 622 mm. Seasonal rainfall pattern indicates that, major amount of (406mm) rainfall was recorded during South-West Monsoon seasons, which contributes about 65% of the annual normal rainfall, followed by North-East Monsoon season (136 mm) constituting 22% and remaining (81 mm) 13% in Pre-Monsoon season. Computations were carried out for the 30 year blocks of 1981–2010, the mean monthly rainfall at Hukkeri taluk is ranging between 0 mm during February to 116 mm during June. The coefficient of variation percent for pre-monsoon, monsoon and post-monsoon season is 64, 39 and 65 percent respectively. Annual CV at this station works out to be 26 percent (Table-1).Table 1: Statistical Analysis of Rainfall Data of Hukkeri taluk, (1981 to 2010)

== Agriculture & Irrigation ==
Agriculture is the main occupation in Hukkeri taluk. Major Kharif crops are maize, bajra, jowar, tur and vegetables. Main crops of Rabi season are maize, Bajra, Jowar and sunflower. Water intensive crops like sugarcane and paddy are grown in 18% of total crop area. Maize is grown in 11% and oil seeds in 23% of total crop area of taluk. Bajra & jowar account 12% of total crop area.

=== Cropping pattern ===
Soil

The soils of Hukkeri taluka can broadly be classified into red and black soils. These soils vary in depth and texture, depending on the parent rock type, physiographic settings, and climatic conditions. By and large, black soils predominate the Deccan Trap terrain and red soils are found in the southwestern and southeastern part of the district in gneissic terrain. These soils, in turn, can be grouped into seven categories, viz.,

- shallow black soil,
- medium black soil,
- deep to very black soil,
- mixed red & black soil,
- red loamy soil,

which cover large tracts of land and the other two:

- lateritic soil and
- alluvium soil

are local in nature.

== Transportation ==
Hukkeri has a wide range of road networks. Adjacent cities can be reached through state highways and villages have proper roadways as well.

Nearest Airport – Belgaum - 50 km, Kolhapur- 75 km.

Nearest Railway stations – Belgaum - 50 km and Ghataprabha – 18 km

Major Near by Rivers – Ghataprabha River, Hiranyakesi River and Markandeya river

Near by Factories – Hira Sugar Factory (Sankeshwar), Sangam Sugar Factory (Hosur), Vishwanath Sugar Factory (Bellada Bagewadi)

Nearby Picnic spots –

1) Gokak falls (A waterfall created by Ghataprabha river which falls from a height of 52 metres/ 171 feet over a sandstone cliff resembling the Niagara Falls. There is a hanging bridge across the river, measuring about 201 meters (659 ft). Its height above the rock bed is 14 meters (46 ft). There is an old electricity generation station and electricity was generated here for the first time in 1887),

2) Hidkal Dam (A water reservoir built on a Ghataprabha river which provides irrigation benefits to Belagavi and Bagalkote districts),

3)Gudachanamalki falls (The Godachinmalki Falls is a waterfall located on Markandeya river)

It is said that one of the GolGumbaz located in the town has a secret subway to Bijapur.

There are 3 GolGumbaz's are located in the middle of the town Hukkeri. One is used as PWD IB and other 2 are just left.

Agriculture is the major occupation in the taluk. Major crops grown are Cotton, Groundnut, Sugar cane, Soybean, and Maize.

== Demographics ==
As of 2001 India census, Hukkeri had a population of 25014. Males constitute 51% of the population and females 49%. Hukkeri has an average literacy rate of 63%, higher than the national average of 59.5%: male literacy is 72%, and female literacy is 55%. In Hukkeri, 14% of the population is under 6 years of age.

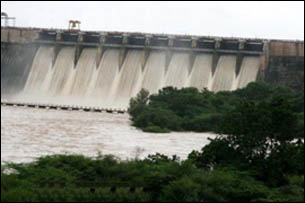
Hidkal Dam Near Hukkeri

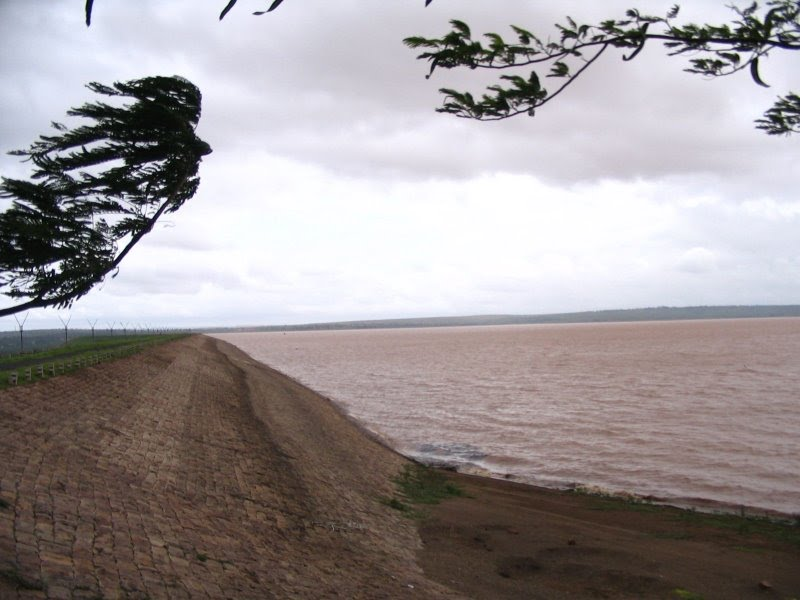
Hidkal Dam Near Hukkeri

== History ==
Hukkeri has been famous since 14th century. In 1327, Mohammed bin Tughluk appointed an Amir here. It is known that Hukkeri and the area around it was under the command of fateh bahadur, a dictator of the dynasty, and in 1502 it was taken over by Yusuf Adil Shah, the Sultan of Bijapur. During his time, Ain-ul-Mulk Jilani built Hukkeri's fortress, palace, and water fountains. In 1542, he along with the Buran Nizamshah of Ahmednagar opposed the Sultan of Bijapur. But, he once again befriended the Shah of Bijapur after Buran Nizamshah was defeated. He was then given the kingdom of Kittur.

After Ain-ul-Mulk Jilani, his brother Fateh Mulk occupied the throne. Subsequently, in 1569, Ranadullakhan of Bijapur and his son Rustam Zaman came to power in 1616. After that, Abdul Qadar took the control of Hukkeri.

=== Hukkeri Rural Electric Co-operative Society Ltd (HRECS) ===
The Hukkeri Rural Electric Co-Operative Society Ltd is the First Rural Electric Co-operative Society to be registered in India. Hukkeri Society is one of the last surviving epitomes of the co-operative movement in India.. The Society is daring all odds as amidst 74% IP set consumption, the highest ever for any distribution areas in the state, without receiving any subsidy from the Government. Whole of Hukkeri Taluk and some villages of Belgaum, Gokak and Chikkodi taluks are serviced by Hukkeri Rural Electricity Co-operative Society. HRECS covers an area of 30.00 km^{2}, with a population of over 4Lacs. The organization has five zones which are called as

- Hukkeri (East)
- Hukkeri (West)
- Sankeshwar
- Yamakanmardi
- Hidkal Dam

Hukkeri Society is the only Rural Electric Cooperative Society in the state of Karnataka serving about 83,000 consumers in Hukkeri, Taluka, Sutagatti and Maranahole villages of Belgaum taluk, Kamatyanatti of Chikkodi taluk and water supply works of Mallapur village in Gokak taluk. The organization was formed as a co-operative society under the Karnataka Co-operative Societies Act, 1959 as one of the five pilot Rural Electric Co-operative Societies (RECS) established on 21-07-1969 through Rural Electrification Corporation Limited (REC), New Delhi, as per the decision of Government of India and based on sponsorship from United States Agency for International Development (USAID) in collaboration with National Rural Electric Cooperative Association (NRECA), of the United States of America. Initially, the Government of Karnataka (GoK) granted the license for distribution of electricity to the Society on 12-10-1970. Since then, the Society is engaged in the distribution of electricity to Hukkeri Taluk. Thereafter, Karnataka Electric Regulatory Commission (KERC) was constituted under the Karnataka Electricity Reforms Act, 1999. The Society was granted the license initially for a period of five years, in October, 2001 thereafter, KERC, by its order No L/1/06 dated 14 November 2006 for a period of twenty five (25) years from 19 October 2006
