= Gokak =

- City
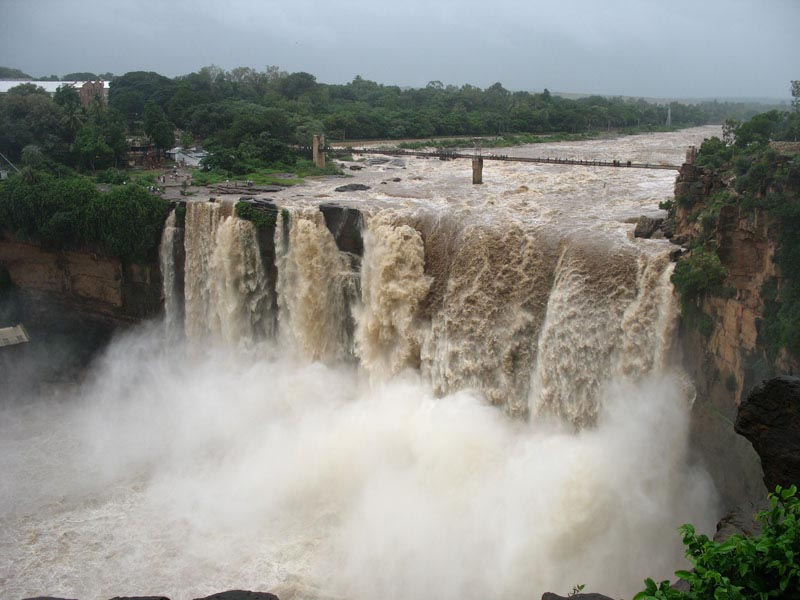
- Gokak Falls
- Nickname: kardant nadu
- Interactive map of Gokak
- Coordinates: 16.1667°N 74.8333°E
- Country: India
- State: Karnataka
- Region: Sahayadri Hills
- District: Belagavi
- Municipal council: 1853

Government
  - Body: City Municipal Council
  - Member of the Legislative Assembly: Shri. Ramesh Laxmanrao Jarkiholi
  - Tahsildar: Shri. Mohan Bhasme.

Area
  - City: 32.05 km^{2} (12.37 sq mi)
  - Rural: 1,472.31 km^{2} (568.46 sq mi)
  - Rank: 2nd in Belagavi District
- Elevation: 570 m (1,870 ft)

Population (2021)
  - City: 253,000
  - Rank: 2nd in Belagavi District
  - Density: 7,890/km^{2} (20,400/sq mi)
  - Rural: 476,448

Languages
  - Official: Kannada
- Time zone: UTC+5:30 (IST)
- PIN: 591 307
- Telephone code: +918332
- Vehicle registration: KA-49
- Sex ratio: 986 ♂/♀
- Website: http://www.gokakcity.mrc.gov.in

Gokak or Gōkāka is a taluka headquarters in the Belagavi district of Karnataka state, India. It is located around 70 km from Belagavi at the confluence of the Ghataprabha and Markandeya rivers. The population of the city is approximately 253,000, according to the 2021 census. Gokak city has the second highest GDP in the district of Belagavi after Belagavi city. Kannada is the commonly spoken language.

Gokak is surrounded on one side by a range of hills, and on the other by a vast plain of black soil. The river Ghataprabha flows from the north side of the city and cascades down through a cleft of 167 ft, to form Gokak Falls before flowing through the city. Since the colonial era, the a hydroelectric station under the waterfall has been used to power Gokak Mills, one of the largest manufacturers and exporters of yarn in India. The river Markandeya, a tributary of the Ghataprabha, dashes down through 43 ft step wise hill plates to form Godachinamalaki Falls.

== History ==
Gokak lies in what the Puranas call the Kuntala country. According to regional accounts, the area was ruled in turn by the Western Chalukyas, the Rashtrakutas and the Kalyani Chalukyas, and by the Rattas, who governed the Gokak region as their subordinates from about 850 to 1250 CE. Temples and basadis were built at Konnur, Gokak Falls, Gokak and Mamadapur during this period. The Yadavas of Devagiri later took the area from the Rattas and were in turn defeated by the Delhi Sultanate. Later rulers included the Vijayanagara Empire, the Bahmani Sultanate, the Bijapur Sultanate, the Mughals, Hyder Ali, Tipu Sultan, the Ghorpades and the Peshwas. The British took Gokak from the Peshwas in 1818, and it became a municipality in 1853.

During British rule, the Forbes Gokak spinning mill, now owned by Gokak Textiles of the Shapoorji Pallonji Group, was established in 1887 at Gokak Falls, about 6 km (3.7 mi) north-west of the town. A hydroelectric power plant was built at the falls in the same year. After the 2004 Indian Ocean earthquake and tsunami, government employees in Gokak taluka donated a day's salary to the Prime Minister's Relief Fund, and workers at the Forbes-Gokak textile mill contributed about ₹700,000.

Gokak is known for its Hindu temples. The Mahalingeshwara temple stands on the bank of the Ghataprabha River near the falls and is built in the later Chalukyan style. It has a garbhagriha (sanctum), an ardhamantapa and an open mukhamantapa, and unusually for a Shiva temple it faces north. Several other temples along the river date to the Kalyani Chalukyas, who ruled parts of the Deccan from the 10th to the 12th centuries. The town is also known for sweets such as karadantu, made with nuts and edible gum, and ladagi laadu.

=== Etymology ===
Gokak (Kannada: ಗೋಕಾಕ) is said to take its name from the goki trees that grow in the region, and from its history as a place where cattle were grazed. It has no anglicised name. Gokak is also a surname, notably that of the scholar V. K. Gokak. In the 16th century the town was ruled by the Gokak Kotwals, who fought a battle with Rani Abbakka.

=== Dispute regarding district status ===
The division of Belgaum district, which has 16 talukas, has long been debated. Gokak, the district's second-largest city, has been a leading candidate for a separate district. Protests there have mostly been peaceful, though some have turned violent and damaged public property. In October 2008, a bandh called to demand district status closed schools, businesses and cinemas, and the North Western Karnataka Road Transport Corporation suspended its services until the evening.

A state committee headed by P. C. Gaddigoudar recommended creating a Gokak district from the talukas of Gokak, Hukkeri, Raybag, Chikkodi and Athani. As of early 2012, no decision had been made.

== Geography ==
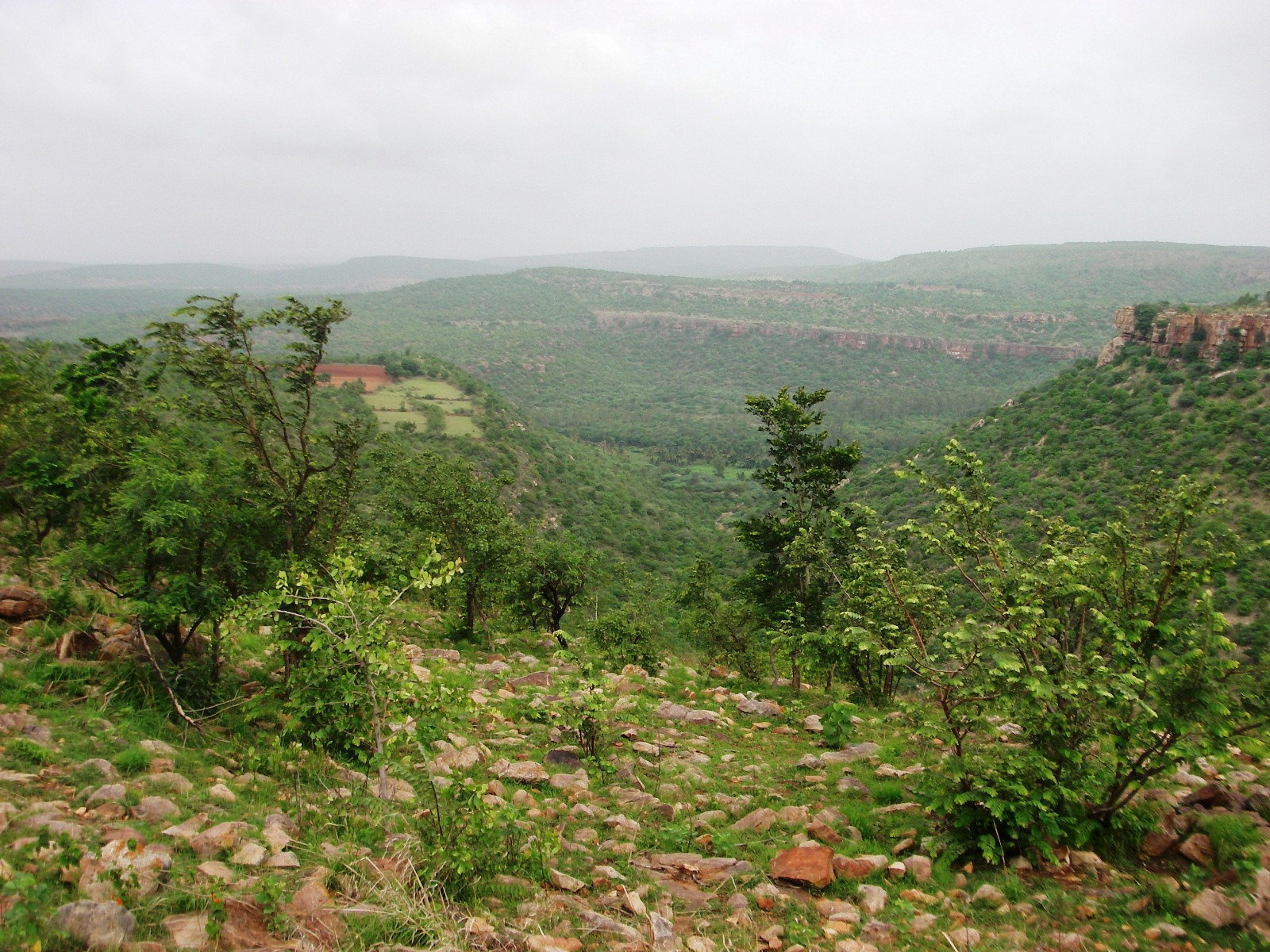
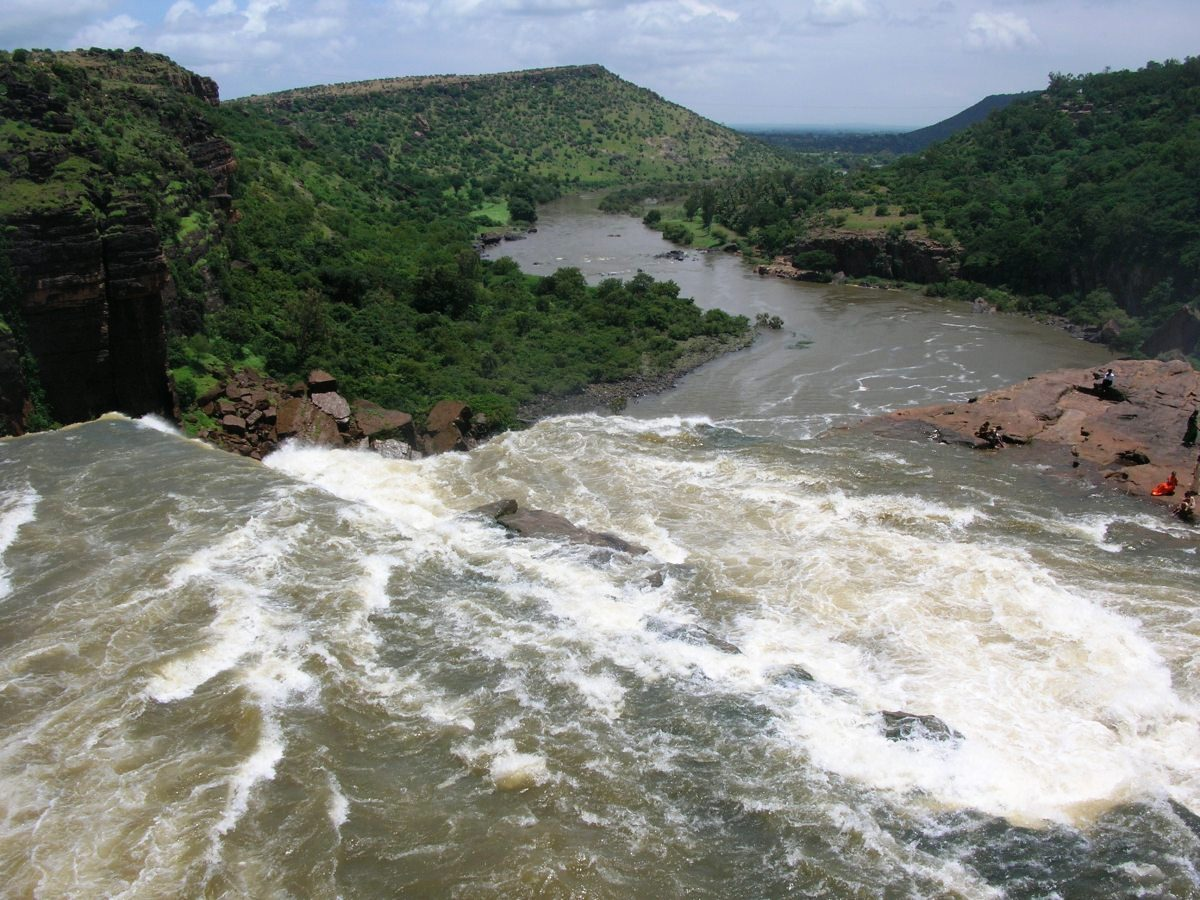
A view from nearby Kadabgatti hill (top) & Ghataprabha River at Gokak Falls.

Gokak is second biggest city after Belgaum city in Belgaum district and is surrounded by the Western Ghats. The Ghataprabha River, which has water almost throughout the year, is the chief source of agricultural and drinking water for local people living in the surrounding villages. It has an average elevation of 553 metres (1814 feet). The city is situated in the central part of Belgaum district which is located in northwestern parts of Karnataka and lies at the border of two states, Maharashtra in the north and Goa on the west. It is located at a distance of 540 km from Bangalore which is the capital city of the state of Karnataka. Gokak comes under Tropical deciduous moist belt in south central India. Majority of the soil in Gokak taluka is composed of laterite soil and small amounts of black soil is found as well.

Vegetation of Gokak can be classified into dry deciduous forests which is generally found scattered in the central and eastern parts of Belgaum district. Domestic animals which are directly dependent on plants can be found in the region. They are used for agricultural as well as transportation purposes in rural areas. Ground water resources are also extensively tapped in remote areas which are not easily accessible to canals and rivers. It has also been found that about 40% of area in Belgaum district has a higher concentration of nitrates in drinking water due to extensive dependency on fertilisers for agriculture. According to a geological survey, ground water in Gokak has a pH of about 8.6 with desirable limits being 6.5 to 8.5. The region around Gokak contains large quantities of gneisses rock which ultimately gives rise to clay deposits. Region lying to the north of Gokak consist of sandstones and quartzite that form low ridges. The manganese deposits occur in Belgaum district between Londa and Gokak taluka. Building stones and moulding sand are available around Khanapur & Gokak in Belgaum district.

=== Climate ===
Being situated in central region of Belgaum district which lies in the rugged terrain of north-western Karnataka, Gokak is well known for its pleasant warm climate throughout the year except for the winter. Gokak receives rainfall from both the northeast and the southwest monsoons and the wettest months are June–September. It has the Tropical savannah with dry winter climatic conditions. December & January are generally cold as compared to the rest of year. The coldest month is January with an average low temperature of 15.2 °C and the hottest month is April with an average high temperature of 35.7 °C. Winter temperatures rarely drop below 14 °C (54 °F), and summer temperatures seldom exceed 34–35 °C.

Climate data for Gokak
Month	Jan	Feb	Mar	Apr	May	Jun	Jul	Aug	Sep	Oct	Nov	Dec	Year
Record high °C (°F)	34.2 (93.6)	37 (99)	39.2 (102.6)	40.2 (104.4)	39.8 (103.6)	38.7 (101.7)	34.6 (94.3)	35.7 (96.3)	38.2 (100.8)	33.7 (92.7)	38.6 (101.5)	39 (102)	40.2 (104.4)
Mean daily maximum °C (°F)	29.7 (85.5)	32.1 (89.8)	34.7 (94.5)	35.7 (96.3)	34.2 (93.6)	28.7 (83.7)	26.3 (79.3)	26.1 (79.0)	28 (82)	29.2 (84.6)	29.2 (84.6)	28.6 (83.5)	30.2 (86.4)
Daily mean °C (°F)	22.4 (72.3)	25.6 (78.1)	26.4 (79.5)	28.1 (82.6)	27.6 (81.7)	24.8 (76.6)	23.4 (74.1)	23.1 (73.6)	23.7 (74.7)	24.1 (75.4)	23.6 (74.5)	23.1 (73.6)	24.5 (76.1)
Mean daily minimum °C (°F)	15.2 (59.4)	16.3 (61.3)	18.2 (64.8)	20.5 (68.9)	21.1 (70.0)	21 (70)	20.5 (68.9)	20.1 (68.2)	19.5 (67.1)	19.1 (66.4)	18.7 (65.7)	17.6 (63.7)	18.7 (65.7)
Record low °C (°F)	13.9 (57.0)	15.4 (59.7)	16.7 (62.1)	18.3 (64.9)	19.6 (67.3)	19.1 (66.4)	18.2 (64.8)	17.9 (64.2)	18.5 (65.3)	18.4 (65.1)	17.6 (63.7)	15.1 (59.2)	13.9 (57.0)
Average precipitation mm (inches)	3 (0.1)	2 (0.1)	2.1 (0.08)	32.2 (1.27)	71.2 (2.80)	157.8 (6.21)	196.8 (7.75)	180.8 (7.12)	117.7 (4.63)	40.2 (1.58)	11 (0.4)	5.6 (0.22)	820.4 (32.30)
Mean monthly sunshine hours	262.9	246.5	274.7	260.5	241.8	158.0	142.4	136.7	164.0	191.7	221.4	232.6	2,533.2
Source 1: Yearly weather forecasts
Source 2: Indian Meteorological Department

== Demographics ==
Others include Buddhists, Sikhs & Parsis

Religions in Belgaum district
	Percent
Hinduism	84.59%
Islam	10.4%
Jainism	4.1%
Christianity	0.42%
Others	4.63%

As of 2001 India census, Gokak had a population of 135,166. Males constitute 51% of the population and females 49%. Gokak has an average literacy rate of 67%, higher than the national average of 59.5%: male literacy is 74%, and female literacy is 60%. In Gokak, 13% of the population is under 6 years of age. Kannada is the common language in the region, however other languages like Urdu are spoken by a small population. According to the 2011 census Gokak had a SC and ST population of about 7216 and Below Poverty Line population of about 12203. Total population living in slums was about 7496. The literacy rate in men and women as of 2011 was about 76% and 68% respectively which is a little above national average.

Majority of the population in Gokak follows Hinduism. The religions represented in Belgaum district include Hindus (84.59%), Muslims (10.4%), Jains (4.1%), Christians (0.42%) along with Sikhs, Buddhists and others making up the rest of the population.

== Economy ==
Gokak has a predominant agricultural economy in the rural areas where majority of the people are farmers or affiliated to other Agriculture related business. However the population living in the city is benefited from a number of Industries such as Manufacturing, Engineering, Health care, Agricultural, Automotive, Service industry, Insurance and most recently IT/BPO as well. The region around Gokak and parts of central Belgaum district has a good production yield for Sugarcane, Corn, Cotton, Jowar and Betel leaf owing to which there is an industrial presence of a cotton spinning mill, sugar industry and starch processing plant.

=== KIADB and KSSIDC ===
Gokak is the only area apart from Belgaum in Belgaum district to have a KIADB industrial area (Karnataka Industrial Areas Development Board) and KSSIDC industrial estate (Karnataka State Small Industries Development Corporation). Karnataka Industrial Areas Development Board (KIADB) is a wholly owned infrastructure agency of Government of Karnataka. Some of its aims are to promote rapid industrialisation with "No profit-No loss" policy. It facilitates various infrastructure projects and acquires land to implement various industrialisation schemes approved by the government of Karnataka. Industries present in KIADB are facilitated with well planned wide asphalted roads, potable water supply & power supply lines and office complexes with accommodation of shops and small business. Some of the industries present in KIADB Gokak are related to food processing, edible oil processing, small-scale cotton spinning mills, toys industry and Agarbatthi industry. KSSIDC on the other hand is responsible for the growth and development of small-scale industries. The agency also provides ISI testing units to help small-scale industry units to process quality products. KSSIDC has well distributed network of raw-material depots across the state which facilitates easy distribution of raw materials for small scale industries.

=== Textiles industry ===
Forbes Gokak Ltd. is a major textile industry located about 6 km west of Gokak in the town of Gokak Falls. It is also known as "Gokak Mills". Gokak mills is known for their yarn which is supplied worldwide. Gokak mills have also received ISO 9002 certification.

A unique forestation project known as "Global cooling" was initiated by Gokak Mills on rocky terrain areas surrounding Gokak Falls which led to the planting of 2 million trees. This helped the surrounding area geologically with regard to temperature, rainfall and a better quality of air. This project has won many accolades in the past for the company over and has also received an award in 1994 for its afforestation efforts.

=== Starch processing ===
Riddhi Siddhi Gluco Biols Ltd. (RSGBL) is a major starch processing facility located 3 km west of Gokak. It is one of the largest starch processing industries in India. It is headquartered in Ahmedabad, Gujarat with its manufacturing facilities in Gokak Karnataka, Pantnagar in Uttarakhand and Viramgam in Gujarat. The industry has an ISO 9001 certification and is listed on BSE as well. Riddhi Siddhi has acquired two multi-national corn processing units of Glaxo and Hindustan Unilever in the last 15 years.

== Cuisine ==
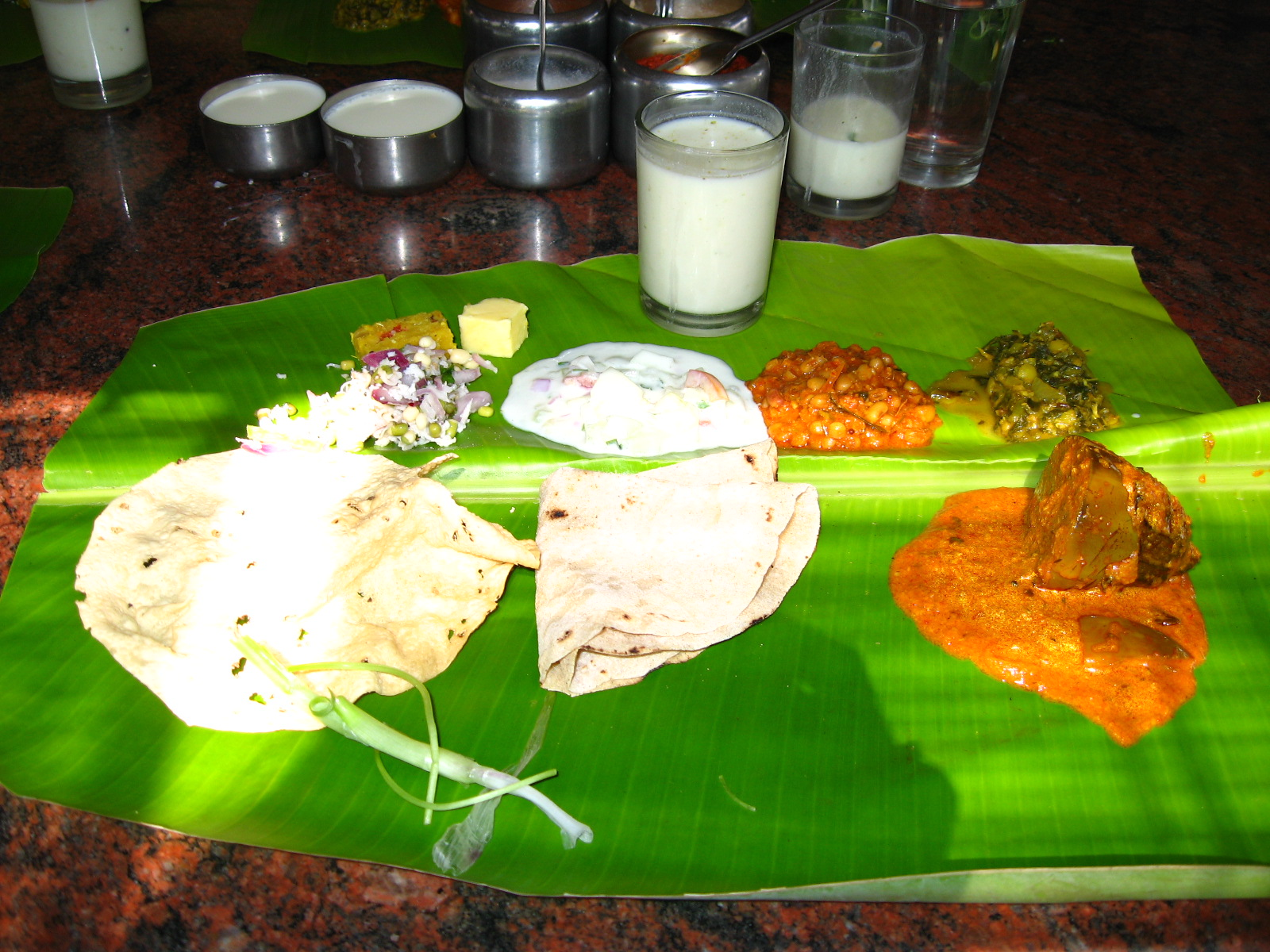
North Karnataka meal

Being close to the border with the state of Maharashtra and Goa, the cuisine in Gokak is influenced by multiple cultures. Delicacies ranging from the chats like Bhelpuri, Sevpuri, Dhokla to the south Indian dishes like Dosa, Idli, Vada (food), Avalakki, Puri Saagu can be found. There are a number of restaurants serving Indian Chinese cuisine like chow mein, Manchow soup, Gobi manchurian, Sichuan noodles & Spring roll. Located in northern part of Karnataka, a typical menu of many households would contain Bhakri, Chapathi, Eggplant curry, Kosambari or raita, sambhar or Saaru, Papad or Happala, Yogurt, Onions, Chilli, Rice, Jolada rotti, Akki rotti, Ragi rotti, Pakora.

Gokak is also known for its sweets namely Karadantu, Ladgi ladu, Peda and Kunda. Karadantu consists of a number of dry fruits like Almonds, Pistachios, Walnuts, Raisins, grated Coconut flakes, Jaggery, Cashewnut, Apricot and Anjeer. Being very nutritious and healthy it supplies a number of nutrients to the people of all ages. There are a number of restaurants in Gokak which serve these speciality sweets. In the recent years it has been exported in small quantities to countries in Europe and North America. Apart from Karadantu, Gokak is also known for its Ladagi Ladu, a ball-shaped popular sweet in India. It is made using Gram flour, Bombay rava, Dry fruits and ground coconut. These are combined with sugar along with other flavourings, cooked in ghee and moulded into a ball shape. Sometimes Ladgi Ladu are prepared using edible resin as well.

== Transportation ==
Majority of public transport in Gokak connecting surrounding villages and towns is through city buses run by NWKRTC from Gokak bus depot. Auto rickshaws are commonly available at a nominal fare for commuting inside the city.

=== Road ===
Gokak is connected by road via State Highway 31 (Jath to Jamboti) and to National Highway 4 (exit at Hattargi cross). NWKRTC which is a sub-division of KSRTC runs buses from Gokak to all corners of Karnataka as well as neighbouring states. There are many prominent private bus services which operate across all major destinations in Karnataka, Goa and Maharashtra. The other state highways passing through Gokak are State Highway 44 (Sankeshwar to Sangam), State Highway 45 (Arabhavi to Challakere), State Highway 103 (Gokak to Saundatti), State Highway 134 (Badami to NH 4 at Hattargi Cross).

=== Rail ===
Gokak Road (Konnur) and Ghataprabha are the two main railway stations near Gokak located at a distance of about 12 km and 14 km respectively. These stations fall under Indian Railways grid and are a part of south western division. Miraj junction, which comes under Central Railway Zone is the closest railway junctions to Gokak Road station. They are well connected to major cities like Bangalore, Mysore, Mangalore, Pune, Mumbai, Hyderabad, Goa, New Delhi and Chennai.

=== Air ===
The closest Airport to Gokak is Belgaum Airport which is the Oldest Airport in North Karnataka located about 60 km southeast in the town of Sambra . It is the only airport in North Karnataka with an Airforce base. Belagavi is directly connected with Mumbai and Bangalore. The airport is located at 10 km from Belgaum on SH 20 (Belgaum–Bagalkot Road). Hubli and Kolhapur are other domestic airports with 125 and 90 km respectively. Goa-Dabolim International airport is the nearest international airport with 190 km and Manohar International Airport - Mopa, Goa is around 175 km.

Belgaum Airport currently has Spicejet flight services to Bangalore, Mumbai, Other destinations like Chennai, Hyderabad, New Delhi, Chandigarh, Ahmedabad are also scheduled in recent days. Air India has a daily service to Pune.

== Gallery ==
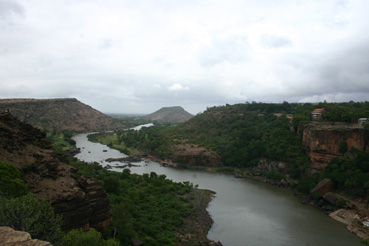
Gokak Valley from the falls cliffs.

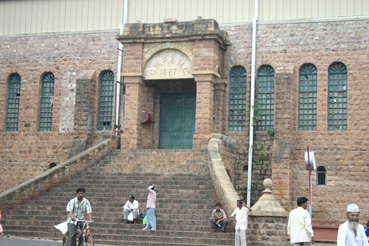
Gokak Mills.

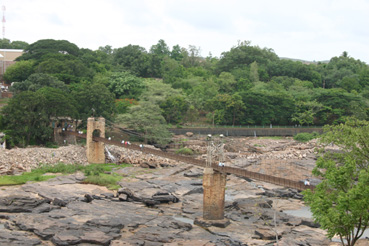
View of Gokak Falls hanging bridge

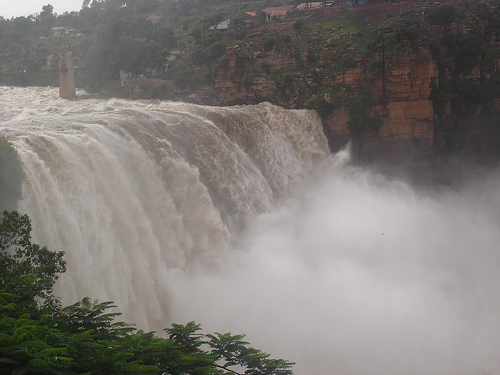
Gokak Falls

Gokak taluka map

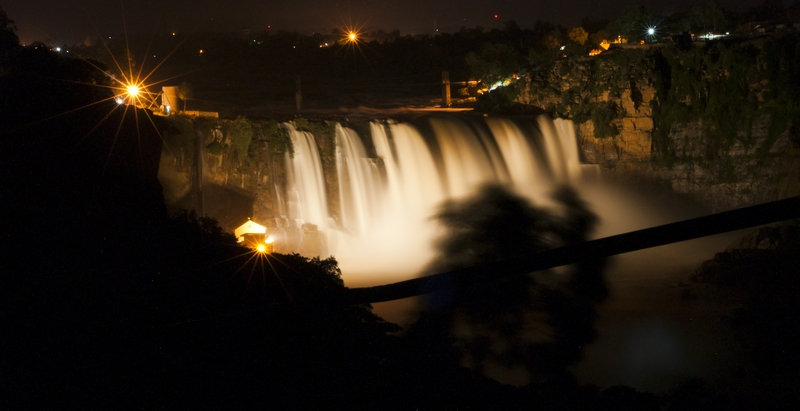
Gokak Falls During Night

== Gokak toys ==
Gokak was once famous for its wooden and paper toys. Artificial fruits, vegetables, animals, birds and more are made up of wood and are popularly known as Gokak toys. These toys are predominantly used as display items at homes and are rarely used by the children as toys. The Karnataka Government is mulling of applying for Geographical indication tag for Gokak toys.

== Books ==
A book named The Life and Living in the Rural Karnatak: (with Reference to Gokak Taluka) by Madhukar Narasinha Desai gives an account of rural conditions with respect to Gokak taluka in the Bombay Karnataka.

== Neighboring locations ==
- Ajjanakatti, Gokak
- Konnur DHUPADAL, DHUPADAL DAM,
