= State Highway 1 (Karnataka) =

Road in Karnataka, India

State Highway 1

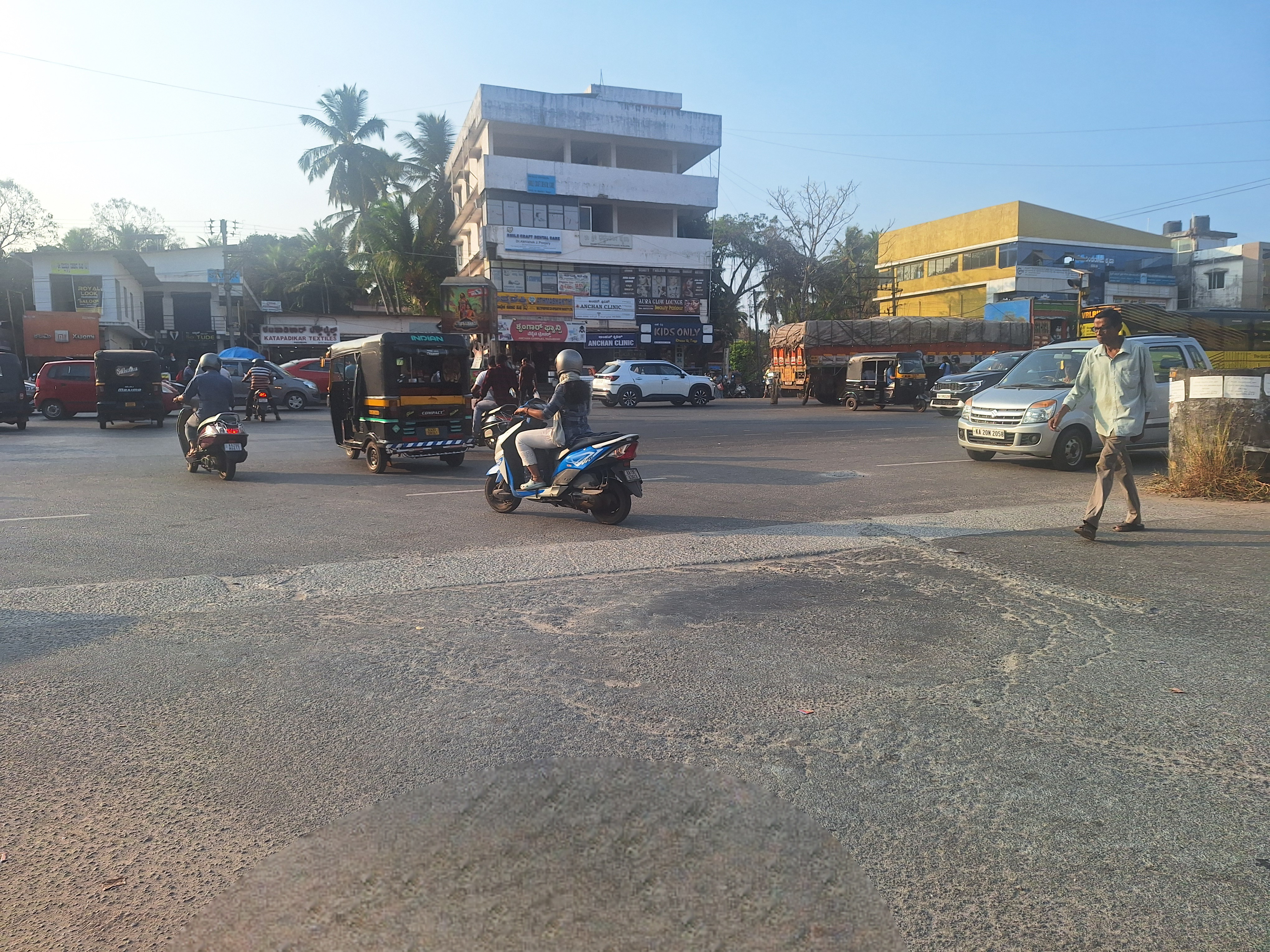
- Padubidri Karnataka State highway 1 starting point with NH 66 intersection.

Route information
- Maintained by KPWD
- Length: 450 km (280 mi)

Major junctions
- South end: Padubidri, Udupi
- North end: Chikalgud, Belgaum

Location
- Country: India
- State: Karnataka
- Districts: Udupi, Shimoga, Haveri, Dharwad, Belgaum
- Primary destinations: Karkala, Agumbe, Thirthahalli, Dharwad

Highway system
- Roads in India; Expressways; National; State; Asian; State Highways in Karnataka
← NH 66	→ NH 48

Karnataka State Highway 1, commonly referred to as KA SH 1, is a normal state highway that runs north through Udupi, Shimoga, Haveri, Dharwad and Belgaum districts in the state of Karnataka. This state highway touches numerous cities and villages Viz.Karkala, Agumbe, Thirthahalli and Dharwad. The total length of the highway is 450 km.

== Route description ==
State Highway 1 (Karnataka) at Adve

The route followed by this highway is Padubidri - Karkala - Agumbe - Thirthahalli - Konanduru- Anandapura - Hangal - Tadas - Kalghatgi - Dharwad - Uppinbetageri - Belawadi - Bailahongal - Vannuru - Hoskatti - Ankalgi - Basapura - Hidakal Dam - Hosur - Chikalgud

== Major junctions ==
=== National highways ===
- NH 13 at Karkala
- NH 13 at Thirthahalli
- NH 206 at Anandapura
- NH 63 at Kalghatgi
- NH 66 at Padubidri(starting point)

=== State highways ===
- KA SH 65 at Agumbe
- KA SH 52 at Thirthahalli
- KA SH 26 at Riponpet
- KA SH 77 at Anandapura
- KA SH 62 and KA SH 48 at Siralkoppa
- KA SH 69 at Tadas
- KA SH 46 at Kalghatgi
- KA SH 73 and KA SH 28 at Dharwad
- KA SH 30 and KA SH 73 at Belawadi
- KA SH 31 at Bailahongal
- KA SH 103 at Murgod

== Connections ==
Many villages, cities and towns in various districts are connected by this state highway.

== See also ==
- List of state highways in Karnataka
