= Sangolli =

Sangolli Sangolli
- Village
- Country: India
- State: Karnataka
- District: Belagavi

Government
  - Body: Gram Panchayat

Area
  - Total: 10 km^{2} (3.9 sq mi)

Population (2011)
  - Total: 3,784
  - Density: 361/km^{2} (930/sq mi)

Languages
  - Official: Kannada
- Time zone: UTC+5:30 (IST)
- PIN: 591115
- Vehicle registration: KA-24

Sangolli is a village in Bailahongal taluk of Belagavi district Indian State of Karnataka, India. This is the birthplace of prominent warrior Sangolli Rayanna, from Karnataka, India. He was the army chief of the Kingdom of Kittur ruled at the time by Rani Chennamma and fought the British East India Company till his death. His life was the subject of the 2012 Kannada film Sangolli Rayanna.

It is located around 45km from Belagavi city and around 500km from the capital of Karnataka.
