= Belawadi Mallamma =

Queen consort and later regent of the Belawadi Kingdom

Rani Belawadi Mallamma
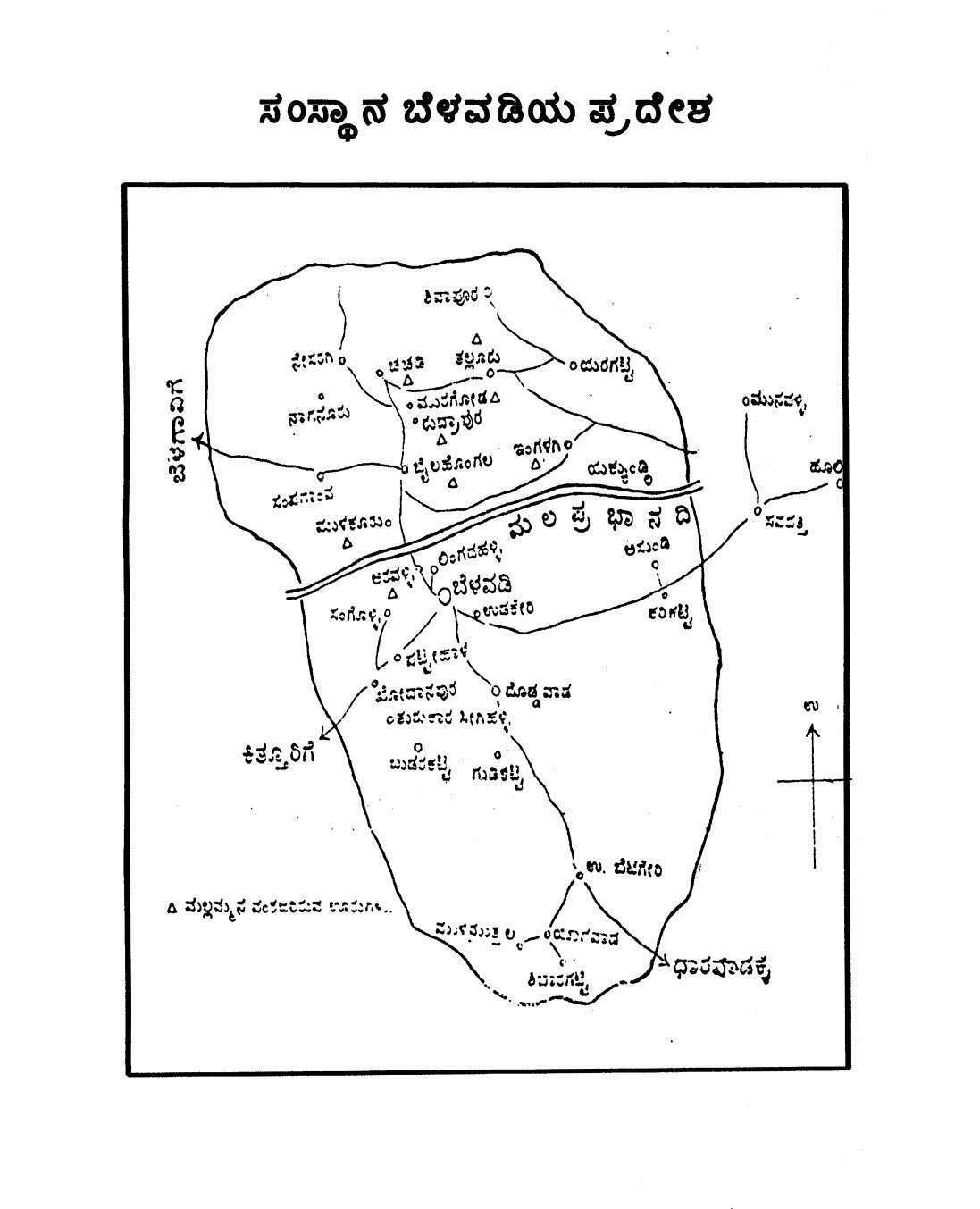
- Map of Belawadi province
- Born: Mallamma; 1624; Sodhe, Karnataka
- Died: 1678 (aged 53–54)
- Occupation: Queen regnant
- Predecessor: Raja Ishwaraprabhu
- Spouse: Raja Ishaprabhu

Belawadi Mallamma (1624–1678) was a warrior queen from the Belawadi province in present-day Karnataka, India. She is known for her leadership and resistance against invaders during a period of significant conflict in the region.

== Biography ==
Belawadi Mallamma (17th century) hailed from Belawadi, located in Bailahongal taluka of Belagavi district in Karnataka. She was the daughter of Sode King Madhulinga Nayaka, whose ancestors were feudatories of the Vijayanagara Empire, and belonged to the Veerashaiva community. Madhulinga Nayaka of the Sodhe Kingdom controlled modern-day Uttara Kannada district and south Goa. The word Mallamma means jasmine.

=== Education ===
Her mother was Rani Viramma. Madhulinga Nayaka ensured Mallamma and her brother. Mallamma also excelled in fencing, archery, horse riding, and javelin throwing, showcasing her competitive spirit.

The school's principal was Shankar Bhat, a notable scholar, and 10 senior shastris (respected teachers of philosophy and of ancient texts) acted as Mallamma's teachers. Raja Madhulinga Nayaka ensured that students at the royal school received comprehensive military training. To achieve this, he appointed Ranavir Singh, a renowned soldier, to instill discipline and teach the art of warfare. Among the students, Mallamma's brother, Sadasivanayaka, excelled in swordsmanship, inspiring Mallamma to follow in his footsteps. Mallamma quickly mastered the sword and went on to become skilled in archery, spear-throwing, and horseback riding. Her abilities not only matched but often surpassed those of her male peers, earning her recognition as a heroic figure within the kingdom at a young age.

Mallamma was respectful of her parents and family traditions. She maintained a disciplined routine, rising early, bathing, and praying to Lord Shiva and the bhel tree.

=== Marriage ===
When Mallamma came of age, her father organized a Swayamvara. Mallamma decided to challenge her suitors to hunt the number of tigers equal to his age plus one, within one month. Invitations were sent far and wide, attracting princes from across the country. Ishwaraprabhu, the prince of Belwadi, emerged victorious by hunting 21 tigers, one more than his age of 20. Their marriage was celebrated with great pomp, and the couple shared a happy life together.

The Desai prince of Belawadi, Ishaprabhu, at 20 years of age, successfully hunted and killed 21 tigers in a month, earning the hand of Mallamma. With this union, Mallamma became known as Belawadi Mallamma and, along with Ishaprabhu, would later become the ruling couple of Belawadi, a relatively small kingdom whose territories covered parts of modern-day Belagavi and Dharwad districts.

== Reign ==
Raja Isaprahu and Rani Mallamma were skilled rulers of Belavadi, maintaining a 10,000-strong army to protect their prosperous kingdom. They fostered trade through ports like Karwar and supported farmers and merchants. Belavadi, with 160 villages, produced crops like rice and jaggery, while Swadi, its southern neighbor, excelled in spices. The kingdom extended from Yakkund to Devarahubballi, with its people living in peace and prosperity. Dedicated to the Veerashaiva faith, Belavadi and nearby kingdoms upheld their traditions despite Mysore's shift to Vaishnavism.

As queen, Mallamma managed the administration of her kingdom and took steps to ensure its security. Her reign occurred during a time of invasions and political instability in the Deccan region.

== Engagement with Shivaji's Forces ==
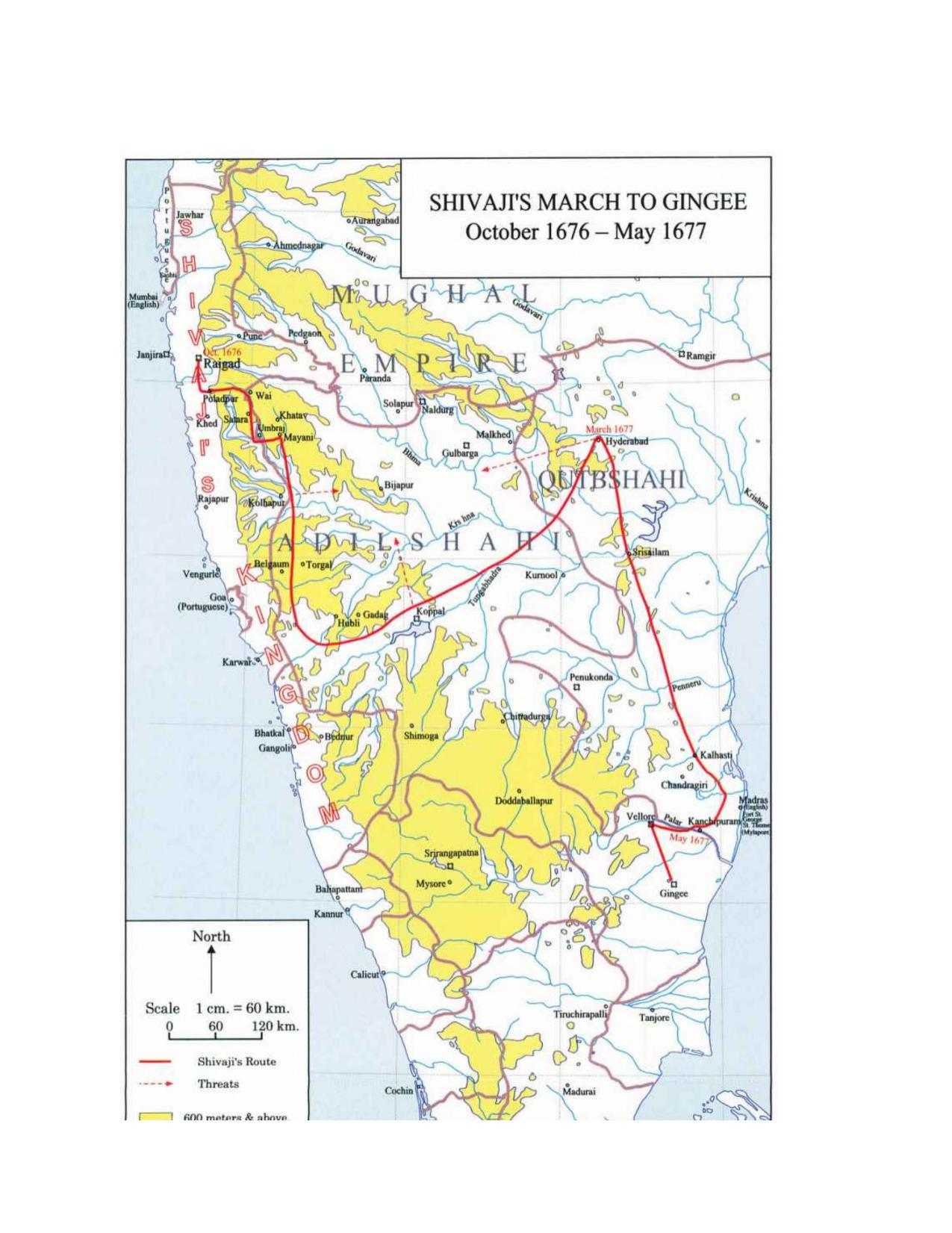
Shivaji's Southern Campaign

When Shivaji captured Tanjavur (1676–78), his forces set up camp at Yedvada, a village near Belawadi. A dispute arose when mischievous Maratha soldiers, struggling with a milk shortage, seized cows from local milk sellers. The villagers reported the incident to King Ishwaraprabhu, who sought a peaceful resolution. However, his commander, Siddanagouda Patil, faced resistance from the Maratha troops, escalating tensions.

Rani Mallamma took charge, leading an army of 2,000 women soldiers and 3,000 female bodyguards. Her army ferociously attacked Maratha army with slogans of "Jai Veerabhadra" meaning "Hail Lord Veerabhadra!". Her swift and calculated attack inflicted heavy losses on the Maratha army, forcing them to return the cattle. This defeat enraged Shivaji, prompting him to dispatch a larger force under General Dadaji to challenge the Belawadi army. During the battle, a Maratha commander fatally wounded Ishwaraprabhu by stabbing him from behind, causing him to fall from his horse. King Ishwaraprabhu was killed in battle. The tragic news reached Mallamma, who was initially overwhelmed with grief. However, she soon rallied and led her women's army into the fight. Under her spirited leadership, the Belawadi forces defended the fort for 27 more days.

The prolonged siege by a woman, defending a modest mud fort, significantly damaged Shivaji's reputation. As reported by the English merchants of Rajapur on February 28, 1678: "At present, he is besieging a fort where, according to his own men, he has faced more disgrace than ever from the Mughals or the Deccan powers. The man who has conquered so many kingdoms is now unable to subdue this woman, the Desai!"

=== Fictional account ===
Mallamma, upon discovering Shivaji's location from an informant named Shantayya, launched an attack on near a temple with her forces. In this version, Shivaji reportedly saw Mallamma as a divine figure resembling ‘Jagadamba’ (Goddess Bhavani) and Realizing she was the queen of Belawadi, he sought her forgiveness for the unintended death of her husband. The scene is depicted as a deeply emotional moment, leading to mutual understanding and reconciliation. Shivaji is said to have honored her as a mother (or a sister in some accounts). Shivaji, upon learning of her injuries and capture, arranged for her medical treatment, displaying a gesture of respect as suggested by a memorial at Yadwad. Mallamma was later invited by Shivaji, he praised her valor, expressed regret for her husband's death, and released her, stating, “I made a mistake, Mother! Kindly forgive me; I do not want your kingdom.” Shivaji, impressed by Mallamma's courage and leadership, treated her with great respect. Following these events, Mallamma effectively administered her kingdom, guiding her son with the support of her brother, Sadashiva Nayaka.

=== Alternate accounts ===
A publication titled Shivaji-Mallammaji Samarotsava was published by the Kannada Department of Mumbai University in 1989, as a Marathi book. It is mentioned by Historians G.B Mehendale and J.D Sarkar, the book was edited by Dr. K. N. Chitnis who wrote that the book is an "early 18th Century Manuscript". This manuscript claims to be written by Shesho Shrinivas Mutalik for a biographical competition about Shivaji, facilitated by Shivaji's daughter-in-law and then regent of Maratha Kingdom, Tarabai, where he secured the 3rd prize. The narrative claims to relate the story of Mallamma, the daughter of Madhulinga Nayak of Sonda, who was married to Ishaprabhu of Belavadi. It details how Shivaji's soldiers seized cows from Belavadi in advance of the campaign in Karnataka. The subsequent conflict, resulted in Ishaprabhu being mortally wounded. Mallamma, after the conflict, refused to accept the aggression from Shivaji's armies and continued the resistance by ambushing him and his few remaining soldiers. It is documented in the Shivaji-Mallammaji Samarotsava, that Shivaji, scared for his life, sought forgiveness from Mallamma, who gave it. The original manuscript is lost, but a Marathi copy in Kannada letters was apparently located in Belavadi, of which is said to be transferred after Mallamma's death in 1717. Dr. Chitnis did accept that it has numerous modern references and interpolations, including the reference to Mallamma defeating Shivaji; he also considered the alternative that the text may be early 18th Century. Some historians believe that text is a Japanese script.

== Legacy ==
The queen died in 1678, leaving behind a legacy of bravery and resilience. Belawadi Mallamma is sometimes referred to as the “First Queen in history to raise women army” and is regarded as a precursor to other women warriors such as Kittur Rani Chennamma. She is remembered in Karnataka for her bravery, and her story is preserved through folk traditions and cultural programs.

Belawadi, once a hub of activity and royal heritage, has faded into a quiet village with no visible remnants of its ancient forts or palaces. The only surviving relic is the temple of Sri Veerabhadreshwara, the Kuladevata of the Belawadi royals. Those curious about Mallamma are often directed to Yadwad, where rare sculptures are preserved.

== Cultural Impact ==
Mallamma's life has been commemorated in art, literature, and oral traditions. Statues and memorials in Karnataka honor her contributions, and she remains a symbol of regional pride.

A finely carved black granite slab, three feet high and two and a half feet wide, holds a unique sculpture that narrates a compelling story of bravery and compassion. The top of the slab is semicircular, divided into two sections.The upper section portrays Shivaji Maharaj astride a horse, dressed in traditional Marathi attire—a long coat with a waistband and a distinct headgear. In his right hand, he wields a sword, while his left holds a shield. Attendants in Maratha costume accompany him, carrying royal insignias such as umbrellas and staffs. A dog is also depicted walking alongside the group, adding a touch of realism to the scene. The bottom panel offers a more intimate depiction. Shivaji is shown holding a bowl and feeding milk to Mallamma's infant child, who sits on his lap. Mallamma, standing nearby, is portrayed with a bow and arrow, her sari tightly draped in the Kannadiga ‘Veerakachche’ style, symbolizing her readiness for combat. The panel includes inscriptions in Kannada at the top, though they are now illegible.

A delegation led by former Karnataka CM Jagadish Shettar met Union Minister Kiren Rijiju to request an equestrian statue of Queen Belavadi Mallamma in front of Parliament House in New Delhi, highlighting her legacy as a warrior queen who led 2,000 women. The delegation presented a memorandum, a book, and a documentary, with Rijiju assuring consideration and discussions with Speaker Om Birla.

== Bibliography ==
English Factory Records on Shivaji - 1659 to 1682.
