= Dodawad =

- Village
- Location in Karnataka, India Dodawad (India)
- Coordinates: 15.79°N 74.75°E
- Country: India
- State: Karnataka
- District: Belgaum
- Talukas: Bailhongal

Population (2001)
  - Total: 8,516

Languages
  - Official: Kannada
- Time zone: UTC+5:30 (IST)

Dodawad is a southern state of Karnataka, India. It is located in the Bailhongal taluk of Belgaum district in Karnataka.

== Demographics ==
At the 2001 India census, Dodawad had a population of 8516 with 4426 males and 4090 females.

== See also ==
- Belgaum
- Districts of Karnataka
