= Kalabhavi =

- Village
- Country: India
- State: Karnataka
- District: Belgaum
- Talukas: Kittur

Languages
  - Official: Kannada
- Time zone: UTC+5:30 (IST)
- Nearest city: Kittur

Kalabhavi is a village in Belgaum district in Karnataka, India.

Kalabhavi is in Kittur Taluk. It is located 43 km to the east of District headquarters Belgaum. 21 km from Bhailhongal. 496 km from State capital Bangalore

Kalabhavi Pin code is 591115 and postal head office is Kittur.

Nearest places Sangolli (6 km), Ugarkhod (8 km), Pattihal K.b (8 km), Neginhal (9 km), Kadrolli (9 km) are the nearby villages to Kalabhavi. Kalabhavi is surrounded by Dharwad Taluk to the south, Khanapur Taluk to the west, Parasgad Taluk to the east, Belgaum Taluk to the west.

Dharwad, Saundatti-Yellamma, Belgaum, Hubli are the nearby cities to Kalabhavi.
