= Chikkanandi =

Coordinates: 11°44′N 77°18′E

- Village
- Interactive map of Chikkanandi
- Country: India
- State: Karnataka
- District: Belagavi
- Talukas: Gokak

Languages
  - Official: Kannada
- Time zone: UTC+5:30 (IST)
- Postal code: 591233

Chikkanandi is a village in Gokak Taluka of Belagavi district in the southern state of Karnataka, India. It is situated at a distance of 14 km from Gokak Taluka and approx 16 km from Yaragatti.
