= Mohare =

Village in Karnataka, India

- Village
- Location within Karnataka Location within India
- Coordinates: 15°54′55″N 74°45′06″E
- Country: India
- State: Karnataka
- District: Belagavi
- Taluk: Bailhongal

Government
  - Type: Sarpanch

Area
  - Total: 17.91 km^{2} (6.92 sq mi)
- Elevation: 818 m (2,684 ft)

Population (2011)
  - Total: 2,365
  - Density: 132.0/km^{2} (342.0/sq mi)

Languages
  - Official: Kannada
- Time zone: UTC+5:30 (IST)
- PIN: 591147
- STD code: 08288
- Vehicle registration: KA-22

Mohare is a village in Bailhongal Taluk, Belagavi District of Karnataka, India. It is located near the state border with Maharashtra, about 26 kilometres east of the district seat Belgaum, and 16 kilometres northwest of the taluk seat Bailhongal. As of 2011, it has a total population of 2,365.

== Geography ==
Mohare is located to the north of Malaprabha River. It is bounded by Deshnur in the west and Koladur in the east. Its average elevation is 818 metres above the sea level.

== Climate ==
Mohare has a Tropical Savanna Climate (Aw). It sees the most rainfall in July, with 176 mm of average precipitation; and virtually no precipitation in February.

Climate data for Mohare
Month	Jan	Feb	Mar	Apr	May	Jun	Jul	Aug	Sep	Oct	Nov	Dec	Year
Mean daily maximum °C (°F)	28.2 (82.8)	30.6 (87.1)	33.4 (92.1)	34.8 (94.6)	33.3 (91.9)	27 (81)	24.8 (76.6)	24.9 (76.8)	26.2 (79.2)	27.4 (81.3)	27.7 (81.9)	27.6 (81.7)	28.8 (83.9)
Daily mean °C (°F)	21.9 (71.4)	23.9 (75.0)	26.3 (79.3)	27.5 (81.5)	26.6 (79.9)	23.4 (74.1)	22.2 (72.0)	22.1 (71.8)	22.5 (72.5)	23.1 (73.6)	22.6 (72.7)	21.7 (71.1)	23.6 (74.6)
Mean daily minimum °C (°F)	15.6 (60.1)	17.2 (63.0)	19.6 (67.3)	21.4 (70.5)	21.8 (71.2)	21.4 (70.5)	20.8 (69.4)	20.5 (68.9)	20.2 (68.4)	19.5 (67.1)	17.8 (64.0)	16.1 (61.0)	19.3 (66.8)
Average rainfall mm (inches)	1 (0.0)	0 (0)	4 (0.2)	20 (0.8)	49 (1.9)	165 (6.5)	176 (6.9)	141 (5.6)	120 (4.7)	107 (4.2)	27 (1.1)	6 (0.2)	816 (32.1)
Source: Climate-Data.org

== Demographics ==
According to the 2011 Indian Census, there are 511 households within Mohare. Out of the total 2,365 residents, 1,168 are male and 1,197 are female. The total literacy rate is 61.61%, with 857 of the male population and 600 of the female population being literate.
