= Lakkundi, Belagavi =

Village in Karnataka, India

Lakkundi
- Village
- Location within Karnataka Location within India
- Coordinates: 15°51′17″N 74°45′37″E
- Country: India
- State: Karnataka
- District: Belagavi
- Taluk: Sampgoan

Government
  - Type: Sarpanch

Area
  - Total: 6.52 km^{2} (2.52 sq mi)
- Elevation: 745 m (2,444 ft)

Population (2011)
  - Total: 1,720
  - Density: 264/km^{2} (683/sq mi)

Languages
  - Local: Kannada, Marathi
- Time zone: UTC+5:30 (IST)
- PIN: 591102

Lakkundi is a village in Belagavi district, Karnataka, India. It is located in the southern portion of the district, about 34 kilometres east of the district headquarter Belgaum. As of the year 2011, it had a total population of 1,720.

== Geography ==
Kakkundi is situated on the banks of Badabadi River, along the Karnataka State Highway 138. It covers a total area of 652.2 hectares.

== Demographics ==
According to the 2011 census of India, there were 359 households within the village. Among the local population, 858 were male and 862 were female. The average literacy rate was 60.12%, with 581 of the male residents and 453 of the female residents being literate.
