= Krantiveera Sangolli Rayanna =

Sangolli Rayanna (1798–1831), also known as Krantiveera Sangolli Rayanna, was an Indian military leader and revolutionary against colonial expansion.

Krantiveera Sangolli Rayanna may also refer:

- Kranthiveera Sangolli Rayanna (1967 film), a biographical film about him
- Krantiveera Sangolli Rayanna (2012 film), a biographical film about him
- Krantiveera Sangolli Rayanna Railway Station, Bangalore, India
- Krantivira Sangolli Rayanna Railway Station metro station, Bangalore, India
