= Yakkanchi =

- Village
- Interactive map of Yakkanchi
- Coordinates: 16°45′22″N 75°08′56″E
- Country: India
- State: Karnataka
- District: Belgaum
- Talukas: Athani

Languages
  - Official: Kannada
- Time zone: UTC+5:30 (IST)

Yakkanchi is a village in Belgaum district in the southern state of Karnataka, India.
