= Hidakal =

- Village
- Location in Karnataka, India Hidakal (India)
- Coordinates: 16.48°N 74.78°E
- Country: India
- State: Karnataka
- District: Belgaum
- Talukas: Raybag

Government
  - Type: Panchayat raj

Population (2001)
  - Total: 12,404

Languages
  - Official: Kannada
- Time zone: UTC+5:30 (IST)
- ISO 3166 code: IN-KA

Hidakal is a village in the southern state of Karnataka, India. It is located in the Raybag taluk of Belgaum district.

== Demographics ==
At the 2001 India census, Hidakal had a population of 12404 with 6289 males and 6115 females.

== See also ==
- Belgaum
- Districts of Karnataka
