= Shirasangi Lingaraj =

Indian ruler and philanthropist

- Born: Ramappa; 10 January 1861; Shigli, Gadag district
- Died: 23 August 1906 (aged 45)
- Known for: Philanthropy
- Spouse: Bhageerathidevi

Shirasangi Lingaraj Desai (1861-1906) was an Indian philanthropist and ruler king and last provincial ruler of Shirasangi province. He donated all his property to assist education of Veerashaiva students. He presided the first All India Veerashaiva Mahasabha convention held in 1904 at Dharwad.

== Early life ==
Shirasangi Lingaraj was born on 10 January 1861 to Goolappa and Yallavva Madli in Shigli village near Laxmeshwar in Gadag district. Later, he was adopted by Jayappa Desai who was the Desai of Shirasangi Desagati Principality and Gangabhai. On June 2, 1872 his name was changed from Ramappa Madli to Shirasangi Lingaraj Desai.

== Philanthropy ==
=== Navalgund-Sirasangi Trust ===
As part of his Will and testament, the Navalgund-Sirasangi Trust was set up in August 1906 for the upliftment and development of education in Veerashaiva Lingayat students. Several notable recipients of financial assistance from the Trust included D. C. Pavate, B. D. Jatti, S. R. Kanthi and Ratnappa Kumbhar.

== Recognition ==
In 2009, the students and staff celebrated his 148th birth anniversary at C B Kolli Polytechnic College.

In 2012, Students celebrated the 151st anniversary of his birth at PC Jabin Science College.

In 2014, on the 153rd anniversary of his birth, he was recognized at KLE's G.H College for his efforts to prevent child marriage, and for encouraging development in every economic sector.
