= Kochari, Belagavi =

Village in Karnataka, India

Kochari
- Village
- Seal
- Interactive map of Kochari
- Coordinates (Kannada High School Kochari): 16°13′30.6″N 74°33′02.3″E -->

Government
  - Type: Gram Panchayat
  - Body: Kochari Gram Panchayat
  - MP of Belagavi Constituency: Jagadish Shettar (Bharatiya Janata Party)
  - CEO of Zilla Panchayat, Belagavi: Rahul Shinde, IAS
  - Sarpanch of Kochari Gram Panchayat: Name not known

Area
  - Total: 7.35 km^{2} (2.84 sq mi)
- Elevation: 631 m (2,070 ft)

Population (2011)
  - Total: 4,450
  - Density: 605/km^{2} (1,570/sq mi)
- Demonym: Kochari
- Time zone: UTC+5:30 (IST)
- PIN Code: 591340
- STD, Telephone country code: 08333, +91
- ISO 3166 code: IN-KA

Kochari is a village in the Belagavi District of Karnataka, India. It is located in the Hukeri Taluka of the Belagavi District. The people of Kochari primarily rely on agriculture for their livelihoods. Due to the village's location in the Belagavi District, also called the sugar belt, sugarcane farming is a major component of the village's agricultural output. Despite the agricultural reliance, Kochari has a literacy rate of 69% (79.48% Male, 58.54% Female), which is higher than the district average of 63.9%.
