= Belawadi =

Village in Karnataka, India

- Village
- Location in Karnataka, India Belawadi (India)
- Coordinates: 15.7146145°N 74.9166519°E
- Country: India
- State: Karnataka
- District: Belagavi
- Talukas: Bailhongal

Government
  - Body: Grama Panchayath

Area
  - Total: 25.50 km^{2} (9.85 sq mi)
- Elevation: 675 m (2,215 ft)

Population (2011)
  - Total: 8,647
  - Density: 339.1/km^{2} (878.3/sq mi)

Languages
  - Official: Kannada
- Time zone: UTC+5:30 (IST)

Belawadi is a village in the southern state of Karnataka, India. It is located in the Bailhongal taluk of Belgaum district in Karnataka.

== Demographics ==
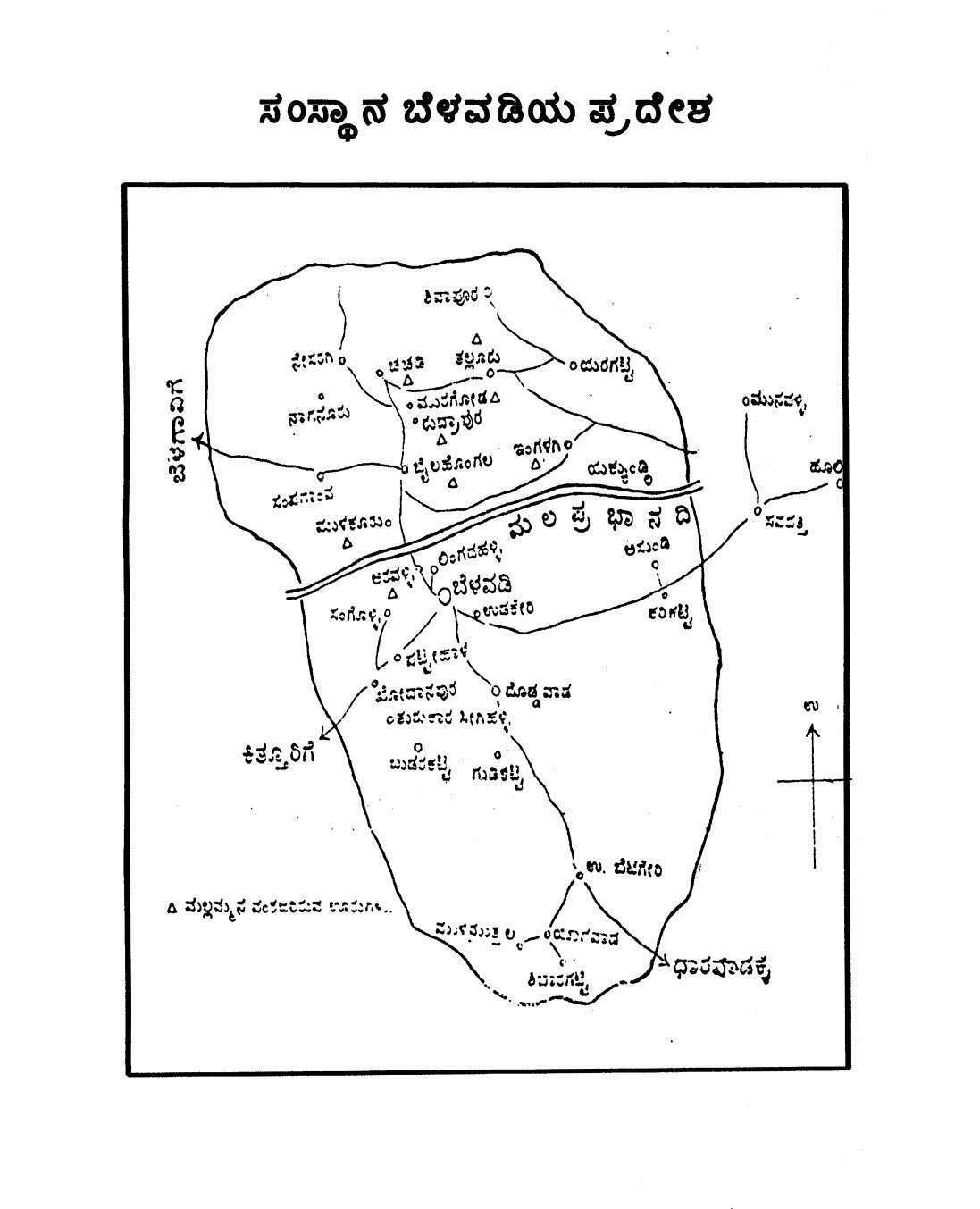
Map of Belawadi province

As of 2001 India census, Belawadi had a population of 8061 with 4089 males and 3972 females.

== See also ==
- Belgaum
- Districts of Karnataka
