= Karwaish =

Karoshi Karoshi
- Village
- KAROSHI
- Country: India
- State: Karnataka
- District: Belgaum
- Established: 1498
- Founder: Great Sufi saint
- Elevation: 536 m (1,759 ft)

Population (2011)
  - Total: 8,481

Languages Kannada
- Time zone: UTC+5:30 (IST)
- Postal code: 591 226

Karoshi is a village panchayat in Belagavi district of Karnataka state of India. Fertile lands and greenery surround the settlement. The main profession of the people here is farming, and the area is also known for its Urdu poetry.

== Geography ==
The village is located in northern Karnataka, 67 km from Belgaum City and 6 km from the Chikodi taluka. The official language is Kannada, which is also spoken by the vast majority of the population, along with a significant Marathi and Hindi speakers. The village is famous for the Ghatti Basavanna temple and Shahnoor Baba Dargah.

== Sources ==
- https://aftabalampatel.blogspot.com/2019/01/25-2018-1308-2018-karoshi-patel-family.html
