= Vijay Gaur =

Vijay Gaur is an artist from Varanasi, Uttar Pradesh who comes from a family of idol-makers and he holds national record for painting 3,500 images of Lord Ganesha at Siddhi Vinayak Temple, Mumbai and he painted these images in 51 hours continuously in 2009 His achievement is recorded in Limca Book of Records. He has produced more than 2 lakhs images or drawings of Ganesha in sketches, oil paintings, collages, stone etc.

== Kittur Chennamma Statue ==
He has sculpted statue of Kittur Chennamma, which was installed in the Parliament House complex at New Delhi on 11 September 2007 and unveiled by President of India, Pratibha Patil. The statue measures 13 feet 7 inches in height and 5 feet 2 inches in breadth and weighs four tons and depicts the Rani Chennamma in astride position on a horse.
