= St John Thackeray =

British collector in Karnataka

- Thackeray's obelisk at Kittur Chennamma park Dharwad
- Born: 22 April 1791; London Borough of Barnet, Greater London, England
- Died: 23 October 1824 (aged 33); Dharwad, Karnataka, India
- Resting place: Dharwad, Karnataka
- Monuments: Thackeray's obelisk at Kittur Chennamma park Dharwad
- Citizenship: British
- Known for: Collector and Political agent, for Southern Mahratta Doab region of British East India Company

St John Thackeray (1791–1824) was a British collector and political agent, who was working in south India for British East India Company during the 1820s.

== Early life ==
St John Thackeray belonged to Madras Civil Service, and was working as a collector and political agent, for Southern Mahratta Doab region of British East India Company.

== Attack on Kittur ==
=== Background ===
The Kittur Kingdom, founded in 1585 by one Desai, was ruled by Mallasarja, who was childless, with Kittur Chennamma as the queen. Mallasarja died in 1824, and whether he adopted a boy before his death was a fact contested by St John Thackeray. Holding that the adoption was either false or forged, Thackeray marched to Kittur. Upon arriving, Thackeray sought to administer the territory. He sealed the treasury in an attempt to confiscate its treasure and jewels. Kittur Chennamma protested and closed the gates of the fort. Thackeray gave the order to blow up the gates, and in the meantime, one of Chennamma's soldiers shot Thackeray.

=== Death ===
Tomb of Thackeray in British Cemetery, Dharwar, Karnataka, India, photographed by Henry Cousens during the 1880s

St John Thackeray was killed on 23 October 1824 at Kittur, Karnataka, when he was waging a war against Kittur Chennamma, the Rani (Queen) of Kittur. He along with other forces tried to enter the fortified town of Kittur with "inadequate means". First he was shot in the stomach as he rode towards the fort and was later hacked to death by a Kittur swordsman. Amatur Balappa, one of the lieutenants of Kittur Chennamma, was involved in killing Thackeray.

=== Memorial ===
An obelisk was constructed at Dharwar in memory of Thackeray.
