= Sampagaon, Belgaum =

Sampagaon
- Village
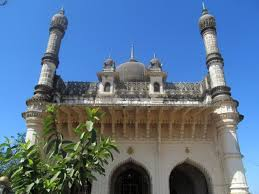
- The Adli Shahi Mosque

- Location in Karnataka, India Sampagaon (India)
- Coordinates: 15.79°N 74.75°E
- Country: India
- State: Karnataka
- District: Belgaum
- Taluka: Bailhongal

Government
  - Body: Grama Panchayath

Area
  - Total: 14.73 km^{2} (5.69 sq mi)

Population (2011)
  - Total: 9,159
  - Density: 621.8/km^{2} (1,610/sq mi)

Languages
  - Official: Kannada
- Time zone: UTC+5:30 (IST)
- Vehicle registration: KA-24

For Sampagaon Taluka, see Bailhongal.

Sampagaon is a village in the southern Indian state of Karnataka. It is located in the Bailhongal taluka of Belgaum district in Karnataka.

== Demographics ==
As of India's 2001 census, Sampagaon (Bailhongal) had a population of 8936 with 4515 males and 4421 females.

== History ==
Hiremallasetty and Chikkamallasetty were two warriors from Adil Shahi kingdom. Adil Shah was pleased with the valour, bravery and honesty of the two brothers and granted them Sardeshmukhi of 6 villages: Rayara Hubbali, Sampagaon, Itagi, Hunasikatti, Kadaravalli and HIrebagewadi. They migrated from Shahapur in 1585 and settled at Sampagaon and established their traditional business. They persuaded their kin to settle with them.

In due time, they cleared the Hongal forest and made it habitable, renaming it Bailahongala (cleared forest). Kittur kingdom was founded in 1585 by Swamiji of Kallumath monastery. Sampagaon/Bailahongala became the capital of the new kingdom. Before Kittur town took its present name, it was called Gijaganagudu (nest of bottle birds). Since the capital was shifted from Sampagaon to the present place, it was called Kittur, (shifted city). Kittur kingdom were the Desai's of Adil Shahi Dynasty of Bijapur.

The town was the taluka headquarters instead of Bailhongal.

Sampagao was a preferred place under the rule of Adil Shahis. It is the only place in the surrounding to have monuments of Adil Shahi. The water reservoir was mostly demanded by the locals, per folklore the area from the mosque to the lake in the village was once a well maintained garden.

On 22 March 1674, the Maratha general Anandrao launched an attack on Sampagaon and looted it.

== See also ==
- Belgaum
- Districts of Karnataka
