= Yaragatti =

- Taluka
- Nickname: Yergatti
- Location in Karnataka, India Yaragatti (India)
- Coordinates: 15.78°N 75.12°E
- Country: India
- State: Karnataka
- District: Belgaum

Government
  - Type: Pattan Panchayat

Population (2011)
  - Total: 9,690

Languages
  - Official: Kannada
- Time zone: UTC+5:30 (IST)

Yaragatti is a taluka in the southern state of Karnataka, India. It is located in the Belagavi district.

== Demographics ==
At the 2011 India census, Yaragatti had a population of 9690 individuals with 4799 males and 4891 females.

== See also ==
- Belgaum
- Districts of Karnataka
