= Desagati Principality =

Type of minor principality in India

Desagati is a type of minor principality in India. It was controlled by a leader called a Desai.

== Desagati families ==
Desagati families (also known as Nadagouda, Desai family) are mentioned in 9th century inscriptions.

== Desagatis in Karnataka ==
=== Ingalagi Desagati ===
Annarao Deshpande (who was a Desai of Ingalagi in present day Bagalkot taluk) had Ingalagi, Kesanur, Bhagavati, Mudapuji and Aanadinni under his Desagati.

=== Nipani Desagati ===
The origin of Nipani Desagati dates back to 1685 when a Mughal governor granted 14 villages as Inam from Hukeri province that belonged to Parganas of Kab bur, Sollapur, Lat (Khadaklat), Soundalaga etc

== Recognition ==
- Indian Council of Historical Research sponsored one-day national seminar, conducted on 4 October 2019 on the topic Desagati Principalities of Bombay Karnataka (1565-1947 A.D.) at K.L.E Society's Arts and Commerce College, Hatalageri Naka, Gadag district, Karnataka (India).
- University Grants Commission (India) sponsored national seminar was held at V.M.S.R Vastrad Arts, Science and Commerce college at Hunagunda on the topic Contributions of Desagati Families of our state
