= Uppinbetageri =

Village in India

- Village
- Country: India
- State: Karnataka
- District: Dharwad
- Talukas: Dharwad

Government
  - Type: Panchayat raj
  - Body: Gram panchayat

Population (2011)
  - Total: 7,931

Languages
  - Official: Kannada
- Time zone: UTC+5:30 (IST)
- ISO 3166 code: IN-KA
- Vehicle registration: KA
- Website: karnataka.gov.in

Uppinbetageri is a village in the southern state of Karnataka, India. It is located in the Dharwad taluk of Dharwad district in Karnataka.

== Demographics ==
As of the 2011 Census of India there were 1,453 households in Uppinbetageri and a total population of 7,931 consisting of 4,074 males and 3,857 females. There were 1,007 children ages 0–6.

== See also ==
- Dharwad
- Districts of Karnataka
