= Devarhubli =

Devara Hubballi Gidadahubballi (ಗಿಡದ ಹುಬ್ಬಳ್ಳಿ)
- Village
- Devara Hubballi (ದೇವರಹುಬ್ಬಳ್ಳಿ)
- Country: India
- State: Karnataka
- District: Dharwad

Government
  - Type: Panchayat raj
  - Body: Gram panchayat

Area
  - Total: 2 km^{2} (0.77 sq mi)

Population (2011)
  - Total: 2,324
  - Density: 1,200/km^{2} (3,000/sq mi)

Languages
  - Official: Kannada
- Time zone: UTC+5:30 (IST)
- Postal code: 580118
- ISO 3166 code: IN-KA
- Vehicle registration: KA
- Website: karnataka.gov.in

Devara Hubballii is a village in the Dharwad district of Karnataka, India, located 12 km to the southwest of the city Dharwad (the headquarters of the district). The village was established by Shree Nagabhooshana Shivayogigalu, a direct disciple of Sri Siddharoodha swamiji Hubballi, who first arrived in the 1960s to begin his spiritual service. Because of these religious activities, the village of Gidadububalli became Devara Hubballi. At present, the village extends its branches throughout the Dharwad district and the Pattiyala and Mantur villages in the Belgaum district. The Shree Ranganatha Temple, built by the Goa Kadamba's emperors, is also located in the village, along with a number of other temples.

The village has a primary school, which is over 100 years old, one high school, and PU College, as well as a convent with a number of students.

== Demographics ==
As per the 2011 Census of India, there were 416 households in Devara Hubballi with a total population of 2,324 (1,187 males and 1,137 females). There were 334 children below the age of 6.

== Geographical ==
Devara Hubballi is a village constituency. It has a village, Panchayat, including 2 small villages, Malluru and Murakatti. Located 12 km to the southwest of the city Dharwad (the headquarters of the district).
