= Kittur =

- Town
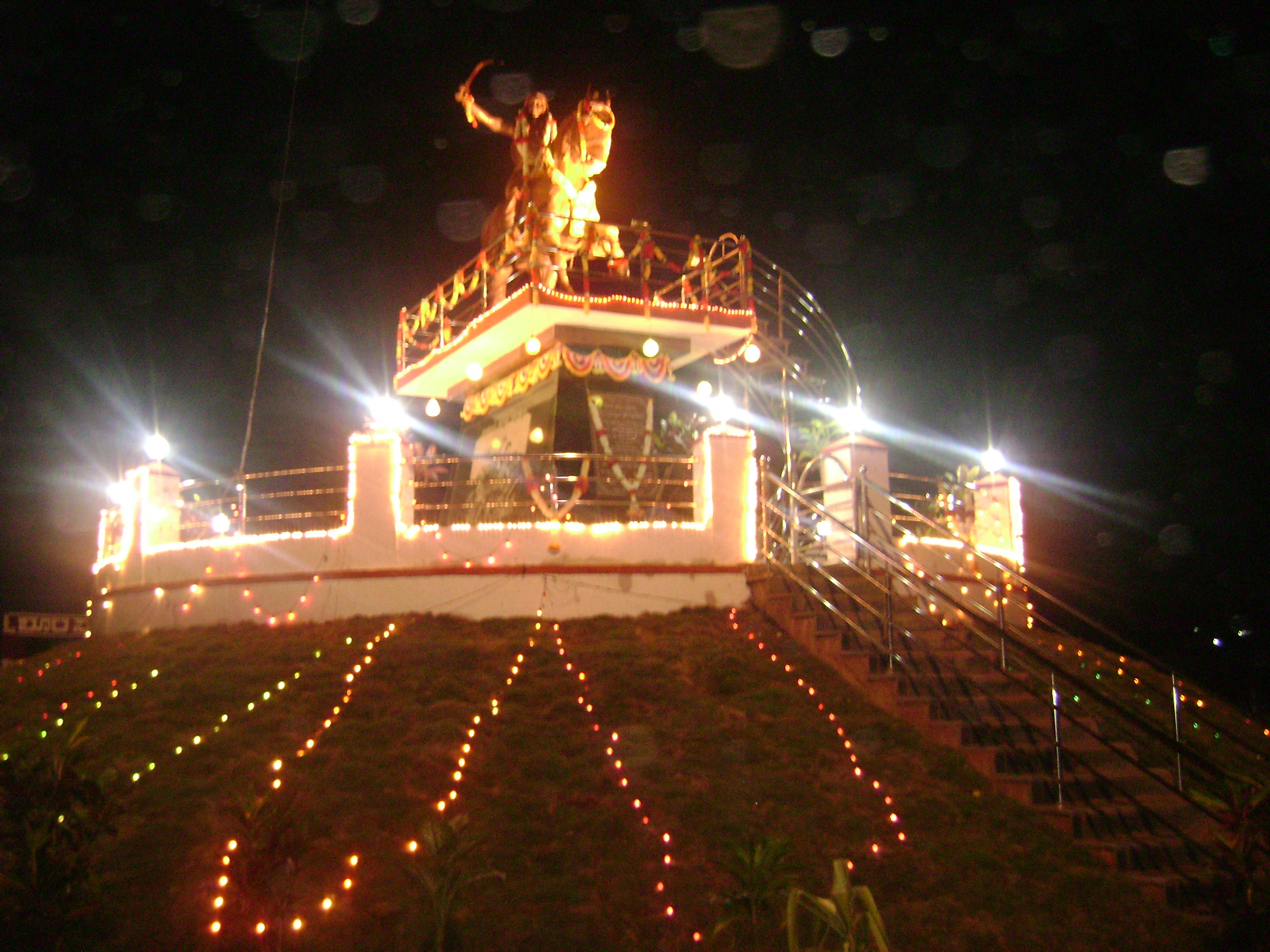
- Interactive map of Kittur
- Coordinates: 15.5993334°N 74.7878902°E
- Country: India
- State: Karnataka
- District: Belagavi

Government
  - Body: Town Panchayat

Area
  - Total: 17.40 km^{2} (6.72 sq mi)
- Elevation: 755 m (2,477 ft)

Population (2011)
  - Total: 16,144
  - Density: 927.8/km^{2} (2,403/sq mi)
- Demonym: Kitturians

Language
  - Official: Kannada
- Time zone: UTC+5:30 (IST)
- PIN: 591115
- ISO 3166 code: IN-KA
- Vehicle registration: KA-24
- Nearest city: Dharwad, Belagavi
- Website: http://www.chennamman-kitturtown.mrc.gov.in/en

Kittur or Kitturu, historically known as Kittoor or Kittore, is a town and a taluk in the Belagavi district of the Indian state of Karnataka. It was part of Bailhongal taluka but was declared as an independent taluka on 23 October 2012 by the Chief Minister of Karnataka on the inauguration of Kittur Utsav. It is 177th Taluk of Karnataka State. It is a place of historical importance because of the armed rebellion of Kittur Chennamma (1778–1829), Rani of the State of Kittur against the British East India Company, during which a British Commissioner, St John Thackeray was killed.

At the 2011 census, it was a village under Sampagaon C D Block with a location code number 598110.

== History ==
Kittur was known as Geejaganahalli in the 12th century. In 1746, Kittur came under the Maratha Empire when it was handed over to them by the Nawab of Savanur. In 1782, Mallasarja, the most powerful of the rulers of Kittur ascended the throne. His only son predeceased him, and so on his death in 1816, his second wife, Chennamma succeeded him to the throne. She is famous for her campaigns against the British East India Company. On the outskirts of the town lie the ruins of the palace within a fort. The palace was the residence of the Rani Chennamma.

In the 18th century, Kittur was ruled by the Marathas, until the Third Anglo-Maratha War, when it came under British suzerainty.

In connection with a disputed succession to this chiefship in 1824, St John Thackeray, Commissioner of Dharwad, was killed in a battle when approaching the Kittur fort. Later another unit stormed Kittur and captured Queen Chennamma, who was imprisoned in Bailhongal Jail where she died. Rani Chennamma became a legend.

Her death was followed by subsequent revolts by her general Sangolli Rayanna, who also waged several campaigns against the British East India Company. He was later hanged in 1831.

The town lends its name to the fictitious coastal town in the 2008 novel Between the Assassinations by Aravind Adiga (Belagavi District has no coast, which rules out the real Kittur being the setting).

== See also ==
- Rani Chennamma
- St John Thackeray attack on Kittur
- Belgaum
- Bailhongal
- Sangolli Rayanna
