= Sangolli Rayanna =

Indian military leader (1798–1831)

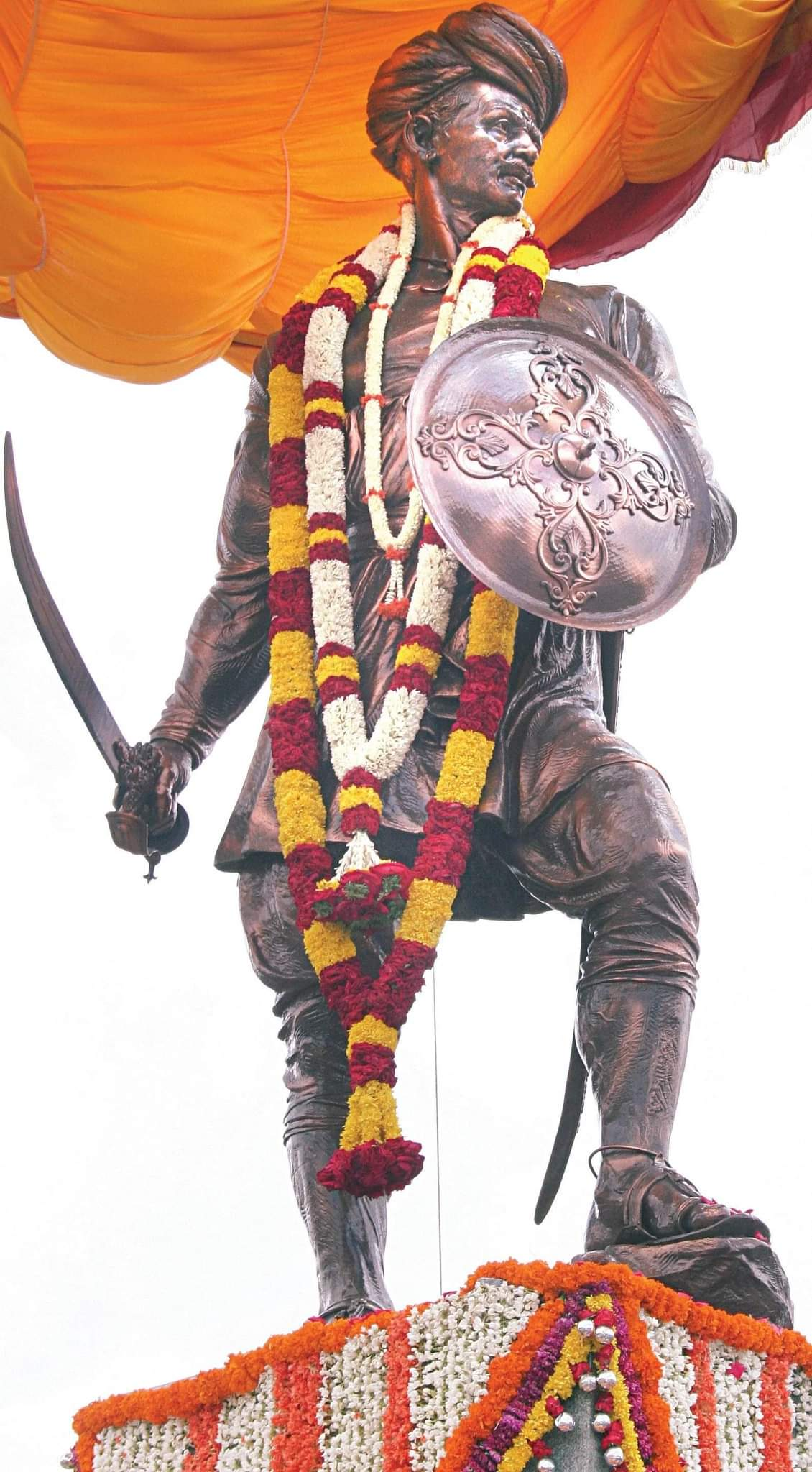
- Born: 15 August 1798; Sangolli, Belagavi[Karnataka]
- Died: 26 January 1831 (aged 33); Nandagad, Belagavi [Karnataka]
- Burial place: Nandagad, Belagavi
- Other name: Rayanna Bharamappa Rogannavar
- Occupation: Military commander

Sangolli Rayanna (15 August 1798 – 26 January 1831) was an Indian military leader. Born in Sangolli, Belagavi district. His father was Bharamappa Rogannavar. His mother was Kenchava. He served as a senior commander in the military of Kittur ruled by Kittur Chennamma, the kingdom - like many others - called by the British as a princely state, during the early 19th century. After Chennamma failed to defend the territory against the British East India Company (EIC) in response to the EIC's infamous Doctrine of Lapse in 1824, Rayanna continued to resist Company rule in India. After leading another uprising against EIC authority, he was ultimately captured by the British and executed by hanging in 1831. As he played a very important role in Indian Freedom, his memorial statue was built in the village of Sangolli, Belagavi. Rayanna's life was the subject of the Kannada-language films Kranthiveera Sangolli Rayanna (1967) and Krantiveera Sangolli Rayanna (2012).

== Early life ==
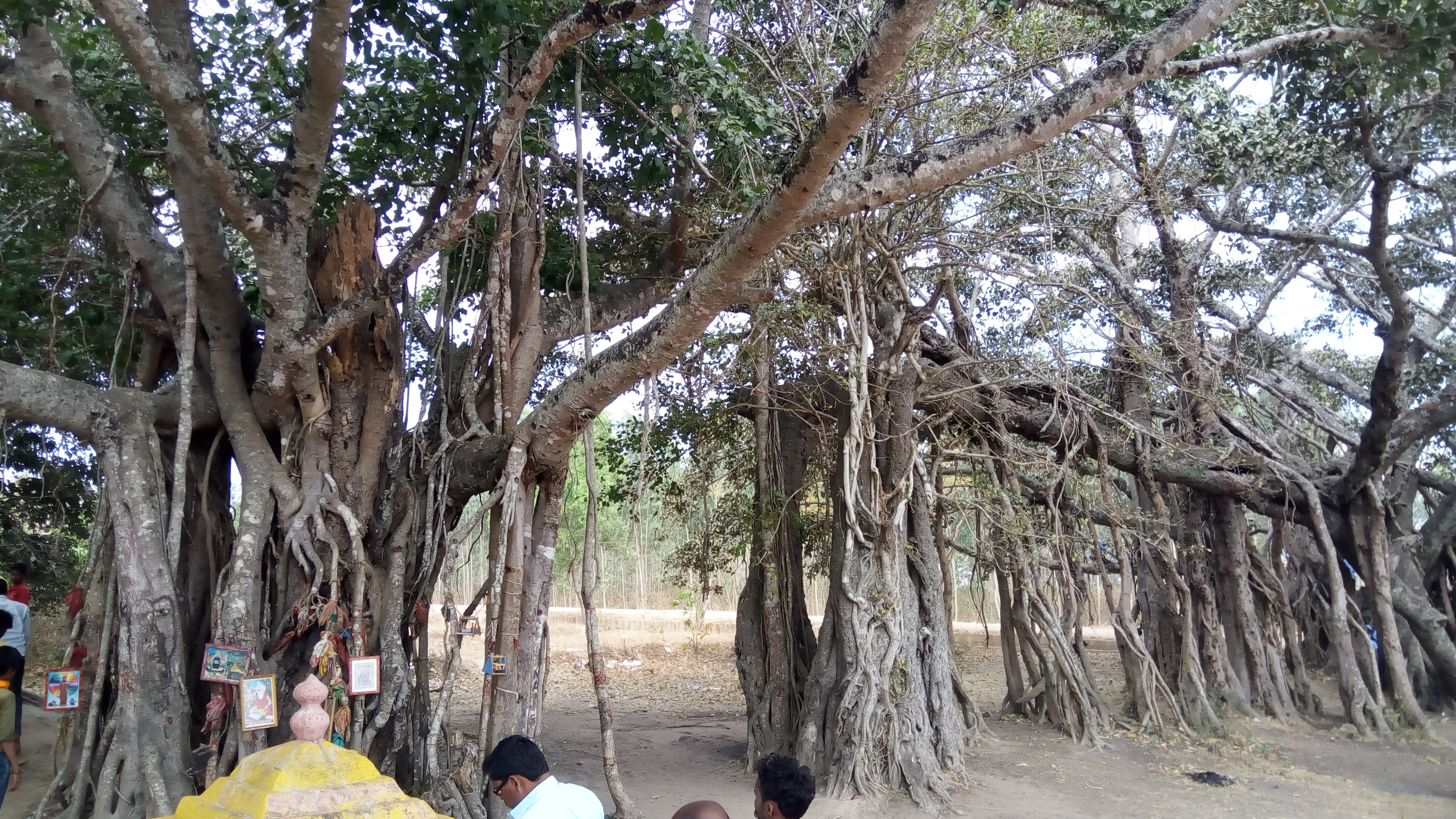
The tree where Rayanna was hanged by the British

Sangolli Rayanna was born on 15 August 1798 kuruba-dhangar caste in Sangolli, Belgavi district. At some point in his life, he enlisted in the military of the Kingdom of Kittur, rising to the position of a senior commander. In 1824, Kittur Chennamma, the ruler of Kittur, rose in rebellion against Company rule in India in response to the British East India Company's (EIC) Doctrine of Lapse. Rayanna fought in the rebellion and was arrested by the British forces, who eventually released him.

== Freedom Fight and death ==
Incensed by the East India Company's confiscation of the majority of his lands (as punishment for participating in the 1824 rebellion) and heavy taxation of the remainder, Rayanna continued to oppose British domination in the region, planning to install Shivalingappa, the son of Chennamma, as the new ruler of Kittur. Lacking the resources to raise a regular army, he recruited men from among the local peasantry, who were similarly incensed by the EIC, and started an insurgency against the British in 1829. His insurgents targeted EIC administrative buildings, British forces and local treasuries, all the while constantly remaining on the move so as to avoid being attacked by a larger enemy force. Rayanna used taxes gained from local landlords and the loot gained from plundering treasuries to fund his insurgency. He was assisted by Siddi leader Gajaveera during his insurgency.

In April 1830, Rayanna was captured alongside Shivalingappa by the British, who tried him in a court of law and sentenced him to death. On 26 January 1831, at the age of thirty-three, he was executed by hanging by the British authorities from a banyan tree near the village of Nandagad. After his death, he was buried near Nandagad. A close associate of Rayanna, Sangolli Bichugatti Channabasappa, planted a banyan sapling on his grave, which remains there to this day; a stambha was also installed near his grave. The Government of Karnataka has named a school, a rock garden, a museum and the major Railway Station at Karnataka's capital, Bengaluru, after Rayanna.

== Legacy ==
- Gee Gee songs (Ballads) are heroic folklore verses composed in North Karnataka' Several such songs are sung about Kittur Chennamma, Sangolli Rayanna and other freedom fighters of pre-independence Karnataka.
- A life size bronze statue of Sangolli Rayanna, riding a horse with open Sword in right hand, was installed near the City Railway station of Bengaluru.
- The main railway station of Bengaluru City was renamed as Krantiveera Sangolli Rayanna Bengaluru Junction Railway station" (KSR Bengaluru Jn.) in 2015.
- In 2012, a biographical film was produced on his life. He was also the subject of another Kannada-language motion picture Krantiveera Sangolli Rayanna (Revolutionary Hero Sangolli Rayanna), directed by Naganna and starring Darshan, Jaya Prada and Nikita Thukral.
