= Kittur Chennamma =

Indian ruler of Kittur (1778-1829)

Rani Chennamma
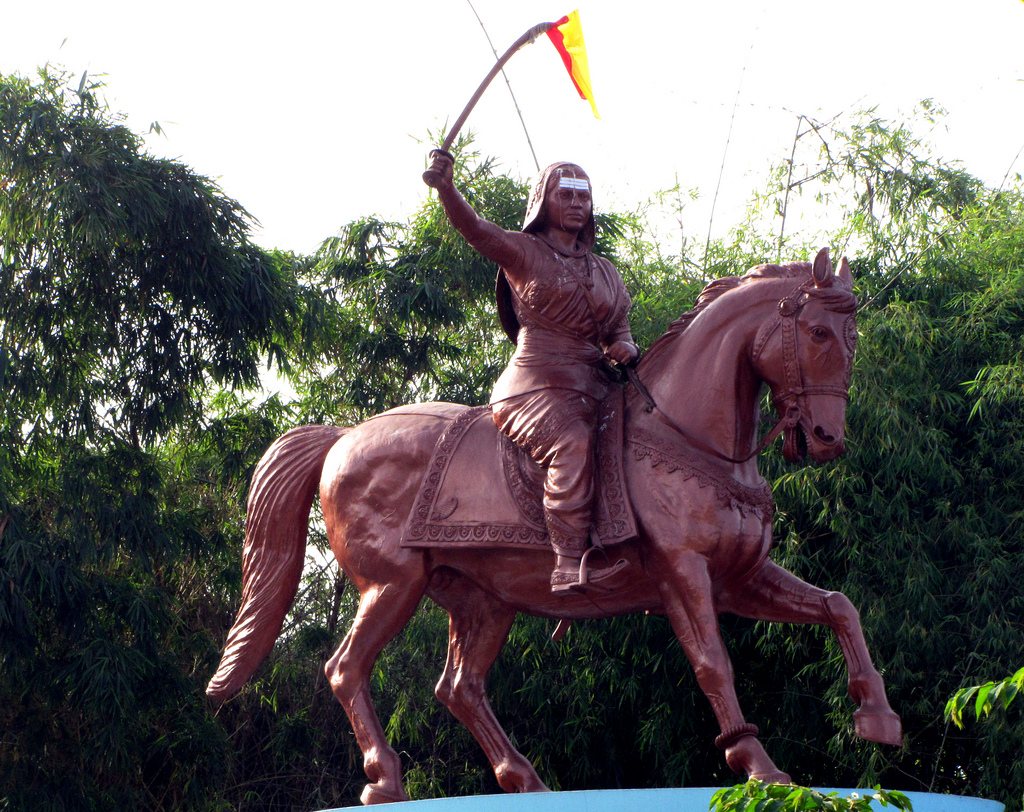
- Statue of Rani Chennamma in Bengaluru

Queen regent of Kittur
- Regency: 1816–1824
- Predecessor: Mallasarja (as King)
- Successor: Monarchy abolished
- Monarch: Shivalingarudra Sarja (1816–1824); Shivalingappa (1824)
- Born: Chennamma; 14 November 1778; Kakati, Belagavi District, present day Karnataka, India
- Died: 21 February 1829 (aged 50); Bailhongal, Bombay Presidency, Company Raj
- Burial: Bailhongal, Karnataka
- Spouse: Mallasarja
- Father: Dhulappa Desai
- Mother: Padmavati
- Religion: Jainism (by birth); Lingayat-Shavite Hinduism (possibly by marriage)

Chennamma of Kittur (14 November 1778 – 21 February 1829) was the Queen of the princely state of Kittur in present-day Karnataka. She led a rebellious armed resistance against the British East India Company, in order to retain control over her dominion. She defeated the British army in the first war, but died as a prisoner after a second war. As one of the first and few female rulers to lead kittur forces against British colonisation, she continues to be remembered as a folk heroine in Karnataka.

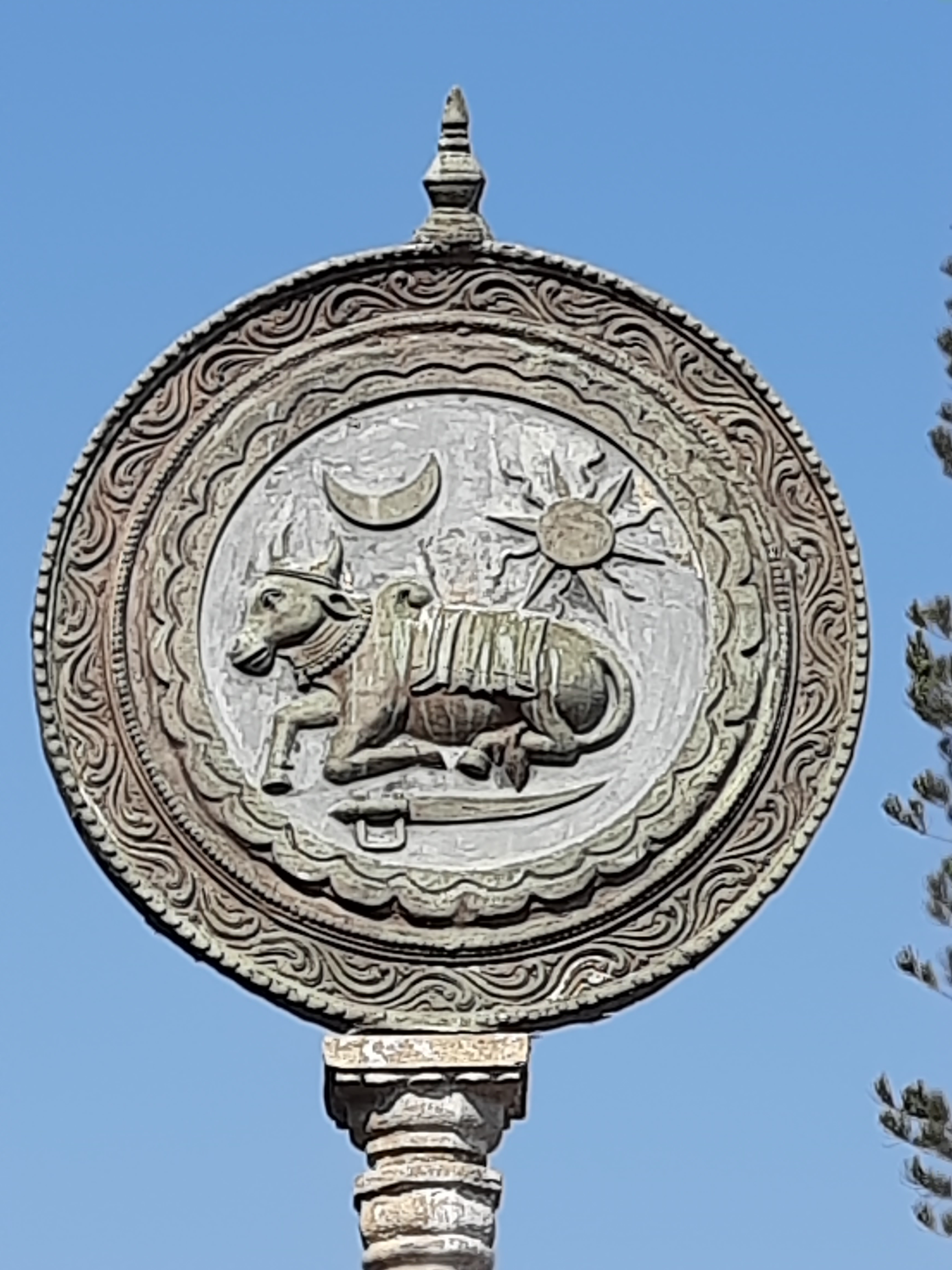
Royal standard of Kittur Chennamma, at Kittur Fort

== Early life ==
Kittur Chennamma was born on 14 November 1778, in Kakati, a small village in the present Belagavi District of Karnataka, India. kakati was a small deshgat (a small princely state). Chennamma's father was Dhulappa Desai and her mother's name was Padmavati. She was born into a Jain family, and her ancestors were follower of Jainism. Later, her family descendents converted to Lingayatism much later, she received training in horse riding, sword fighting and archery from a young age. She married Raja Mallasarja of the Desai family at the age of 15, after looking up to him since the age of 9, and she also adopted a Lingayat boy named Shivalingappa as her heir.

== Conflict against the British ==
Chennamma's husband died in 1816, leaving her with a son and a state full of volatility. This was followed by her son's death in 1824. Rani Chennamma was left with the state of Kittur and an uphill task to maintain its independence from the British. Following the death of her husband and son, Rani Chennamma adopted Shivalingappa in the year 1824 and made him heir to the throne. This irked the East India Company, who ordered Shivalingappa's expulsion. The state of Kittur came under the administration of Dharwad collectorate in charge of St John Thackeray of which Mr Chaplain was the commissioner, both of whom did not recognize the new rule of the regent, and notified Kittur to accept the British control.

This is seen as a predecessor of the later Doctrine of lapse Policy introduced later by Lord Dalhousie, Governor General of India, to annex independent Indian States from 1848, a doctrine based on the idea that in case the ruler of an independent state died childless, the right of ruling the State reverted or "lapsed" to the suzerain.

In 1823, Rani Chennamma sent a letter to Mountstuart Elphinstone, Lieutenant-Governor of the Bombay province pleading her case, but the request was turned down, and war broke out. The British placed a group of sentries around the treasury and crown jewels of Kittur, valued at around 1.5 million rupees upon the outbreak of war in order to protect them. They also mustered a force of 20,797 men and 437 guns, mainly from the third troop of Madras Native Horse Artillery in order to fight the war. In the first round of war, during October 1824, British forces lost heavily and St John Thackeray, collector and political agent, was killed in the war. Amatur Balappa, a lieutenant of Chennamma, was mainly responsible for his killing and losses to British forces. Two British officers, Sir Walter Elliot and Mr Stevenson were also taken as hostages. Rani Chennamma released them with an understanding with Chaplain that the war would be terminated but Chaplain continued the war with more forces. During the second assault, subcollector of Solapur, Munro, nephew of Thomas Munro was killed. Rani Chennamma fought fiercely with the aid of her deputy, Sangolli Rayanna, but was ultimately captured and imprisoned at Bailhongal Fort, where she died on 21 February 1829 due to health deterioration.

Sangolli Rayanna continued the guerrilla war to 1829, in vain, until his capture. Rayanna wanted to install the adopted boy Shivalingappa as the ruler of Kittur, but Rayanna was caught and hanged. Shivalingappa was also arrested by the British. Chennamma's legacy and first victory are still commemorated in Kittur, during the Kittur Utsava held on 22–24 October every year.

== Books ==
- Khare Khare Kitturu Bandaya by M. M. Kalburgi.
- Kitturu Samsthana Sahitya - Part III by M. M. Kalburgi and Part I, Part II by others.
- Kitturu Samsthana Dakhalegalu by A.B.Vaggar.
- Kitturu Rani Chennamma by Sangamesh Tammanagoudar
- Queen of Kittur by Basavaraja Naikar

== Memorials ==
=== Burial place ===
Rani Chennamma's samadhi or burial place is in Bailhongal.

=== Statues ===
Parliament House, New Delhi

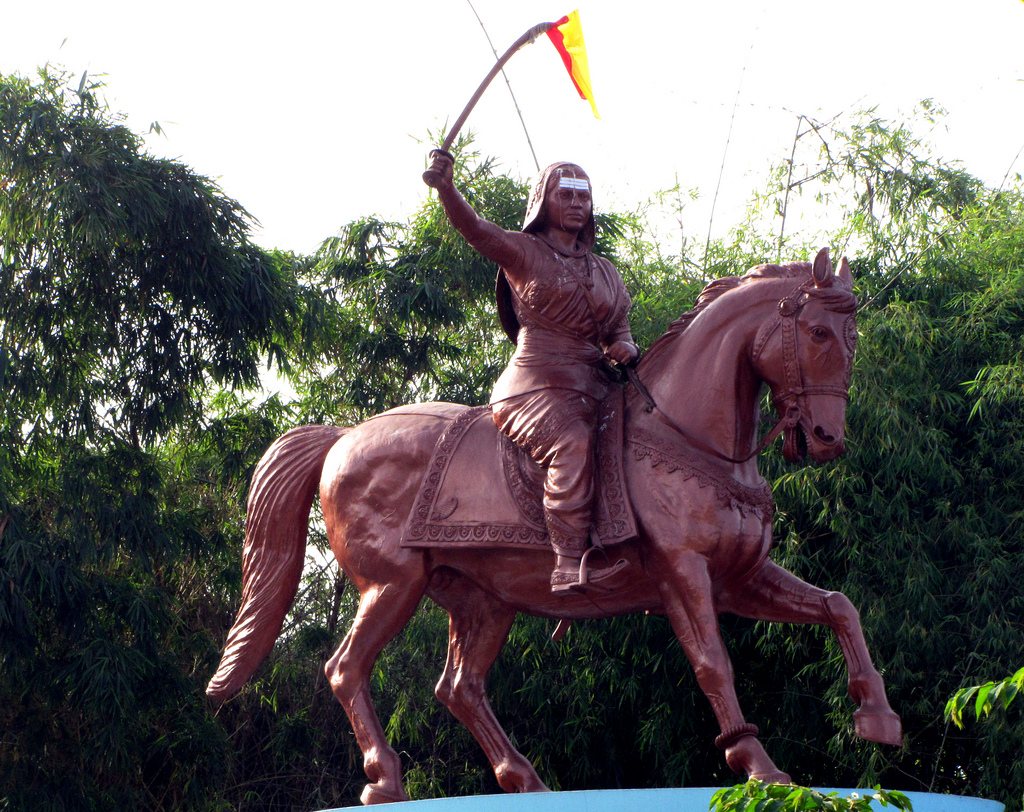
Statue of Kittur Chenamma near Belagavi town hall.

On 11 September 2007 a statue of Rani Chennamma was unveiled at the Indian Parliament Complex by Pratibha Patil, the first woman President of India. On the occasion, Prime Minister Manmohan Singh, Home Minister Shivraj Patil, Lok Sabha speaker Somnath Chatterjee, BJP leader L. K. Advani, Karnataka Chief Minister H. D. Kumaraswamy and others were present, marking the importance of the function. The statue was donated by Kittur Rani Chennamma Memorial Committee and sculpted by Vijay Gaur.

Others

There are also statues commemorating her at Bengaluru, Belagavi, Kittur and Hubballi.

== In popular culture ==
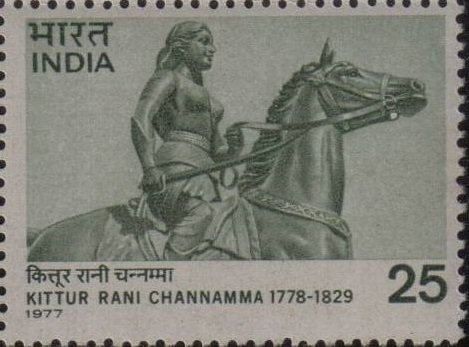
Kittur Rani Chennamma on a 1977 stamp of India

- The heroics of Kittur Rani Chennamma are sung by folk in the form of ballads, lavani and GiGi pada.
- Kittur Chennamma is a 1961 film in Kannada, directed by B. R. Panthulu with B. Saroja Devi in the title role.
- A commemorative postage stamp was released on 23 October 1977 by Government of India.
- Coast guard ship "Kittur Chennamma" was commissioned in 1983 and decommissioned in 2011.
- The Indian Railways train Rani Chennamma Express connecting Bangalore and Sangli is named after her.
- Raiganj University Professor Pinaki Roy's essay "Alternative History: A Postcolonial Rereading of Naikar’s The Queen of Kittur", published in the Indian Journal of Multidisciplinary Academic Research (ISSN 2347-9884), 1(2), August 2014: 105–15, offers several instances of critical references to literary representations of the Queen of Kittur.
- Rani Channamma University in Belagavi is named in her honour.
- MCRN Kittur Chennamma is the name of a Martian Congressional Republic Navy destroyer in the "Reload" episode of the science fiction series The Expanse.
- Remembered in the 2022 film RRR's Etthara Jenda song alongside Tanguturi Prakasam, V. O. Chidambaram Pillai, Kerala Varma Pazhassi Raja, Sardar Vallabhbhai Patel, Bhagat Singh, Shivaji Maharaj, and Subash Chandra Bose
- In Season 3, Episode 4 of the TV series “The Expanse”, the main characters refuel at a spaceship named Kittur Chennamma
- The Government of India issued a ₹200 commemorative coin to mark the 200 years of Rani Channamma’s victory at Kittur on October 24, 2025 featuring a portrait of Rani Channamma at the reverse.
