= Bailhongal =

Bailhongal Bailahongala
- Town
- Location in Karnataka, India
- Coordinates: 15.817°N 74.867°E
- Country: India
- State: Karnataka
- District: Belagavi

Government
  - Body: City Municipal Council

Area
  - Town: 15.30 km^{2} (5.91 sq mi)
  - Rural: 1,109.63 km^{2} (428.43 sq mi)
- Elevation: 664 m (2,178 ft)

Population (2024)
  - Town: 125,670
  - Density: 8,214/km^{2} (21,270/sq mi)
  - Rural: 332,007

Languages
  - Official: Kannada
- Time zone: UTC+5:30 (IST)
- PIN: 591 102
- Telephone code: 08288
- Vehicle registration: KA-24
- Website: https://bailhongalatown.mrc.gov.in/en

Bailhongal is a town, Taluk and one of the three Subdivisional headquarters in Belagavi district of Karnataka state in southern India. The taluk headquarters is about 44 km from the district headquarters.

There are important pilgrim places in the taluk. These include Bhartinand Swamiji Math Inchal, Sogal Someshwar Temple, Moorusavira matha, Kittur Channamma samadhi, Aifil Clock in Bazar Road, Hafiz Bari Dargah, Markaz Masjid, and Jamia Masjid. There are also historical places like Kittur, where freedom fighters like Rani Chennamma and Sangolli Rayanna lived. Most of the agricultural land is controlled by the Malaprabha irrigation project. There are many educational institutes including talukas such as Saundatti, Gokak, Belagavi.

There is a proposal to make Bailhongal as a separate district, to easy administration of the large Belagavi district, including Kittur, Savadatti, Bailhongal and Ramdurg taluks with headquarter at Bailhongal. But the decision is yet to be pending because of district headquarter between Bailhongal and Gokak city crash

But Bailhongal is already a subdivision of Bailhongal, Kittur, Savadatti, Ramdurg, Gokak and Mudalgi talukas

== Geology ==
The taluk has a Tropical savanna climate and semi-Mountainous region climate. Minute quantities of gold are found in some of the nullahs in the Bailhongal Uranium deposits have recently been found in Deshnur, a small village in Bailhongal taluka.

== Demographics ==
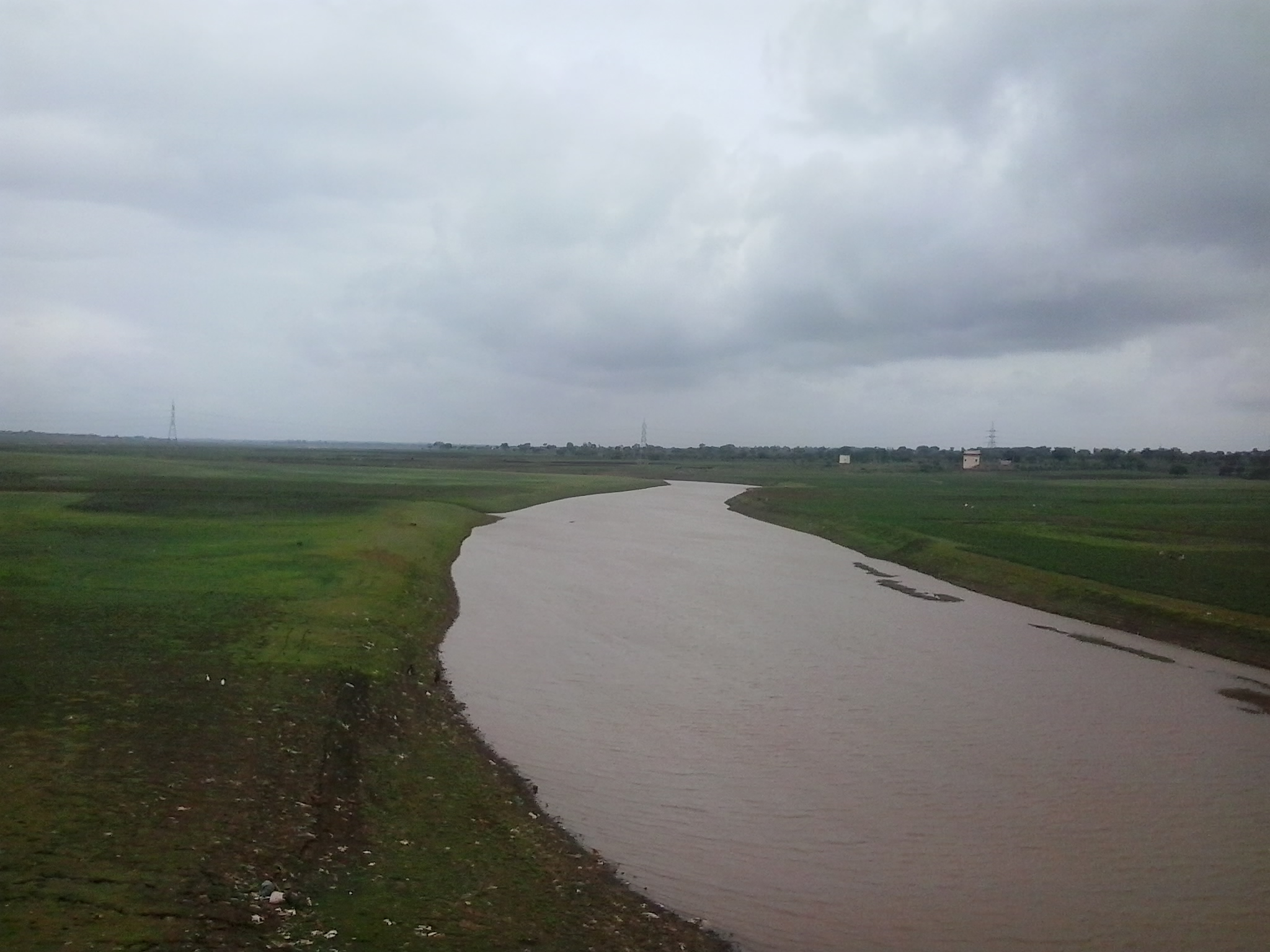
Malaprabha River

As of 2001 India census, Bailhongal had a population of 43,215. But in 2011 the population shot up to around 78,196. Males make up 51% of the population and females 49%. As of 2011, Bailhongal has an average literacy rate of 78%, higher than the national average of 59.5%; with 85% of the men and 71% of women literate. 13% of the population is under 6 years of age. Kannada is main language spoken here.

== Civic administration ==
The civic administration of the town is managed by the Bailhongal city Council, which was established as a municipality in 1919. Earlier It was a municipal district governed by Bombay act III of 1906

Today the Municipal Council oversees the engineering works, health, sanitation, water supply, administration and taxation in the city. It is headed by a Municipal President who is assisted by municipal chief officer and council members. The city is divided into 27 wards and the council members (also known as councilors) are elected by the citizens of Bailhongal every five years. The council members in turn choose the Municipal President. The growth and expansion of the city is managed by the Bailhongal Municipal Council which is headed by a municipal chief officer. Its activities include developing new layouts and roads, town planning and land acquisition.

The citizens of Bailhongal elect one representative, currently Mr. Mahantesh Kaujalgi (Congress), to the Karnataka Legislative Assembly through the constituency of Bailhongal. Bailhongal, being a part of the larger Belagavi Lok Sabha constituency, also elects one member, currently Mr.Jagadish Shettar, to the Lok Sabha, the lower house of the Indian Parliament.

== Economy ==
Bailhongal is a major cotton ginning center in north Karnataka. The first cotton ginning and pressing mill was established in 1911. Agriculture is the main occupation of the Taluka. The crops grown mainly are cotton groundnut, corn, jowar, wheat, maize, and sugarcane.

The Agricultural Produce Market Committee is a marketing board established by the state government of Karnataka has a market yard in Bailhongal since 1936. It facilitates farmers to sell their produce and get reasonable price constituted APMC in many towns. Most of the APMC have market yard where traders and other marketing agents are provided godowns and shops for the sale of agricultural products from farmers. Farmers can sell their produce to agents or traders under supervision of APMC.

== Places of Interest ==
- Kittur Rani Channamma Samadi Garden
- Bailhongal Fort: Rani Chennamma was captured and imprisoned by British Raj at Bailhongal Fort, where she died on 21 February 1829.
- Memorial of Rani Chennamma: Rani Chennamma was buried at with full military honors. Her Samadhi is still preserved at Bailhongal.
- Maddi Bhavi (well): The Mallaprabha River (Nayanagar) is the source of local drinking water, Maddi Bhavi is a secondary source of drinking water.
- Ramallinga Temple, an architectural expression of Chalukya architecture.
- The Jain temples in Devalapur
- Mallammana Belavadi.
- Jain Temple ruins in Wakkund
- Shahi Masjid in Sampgaun
- Shri Kshetra Sogal Waterfalls
- Ramalingeshwara temple Anigol-Bailhongal
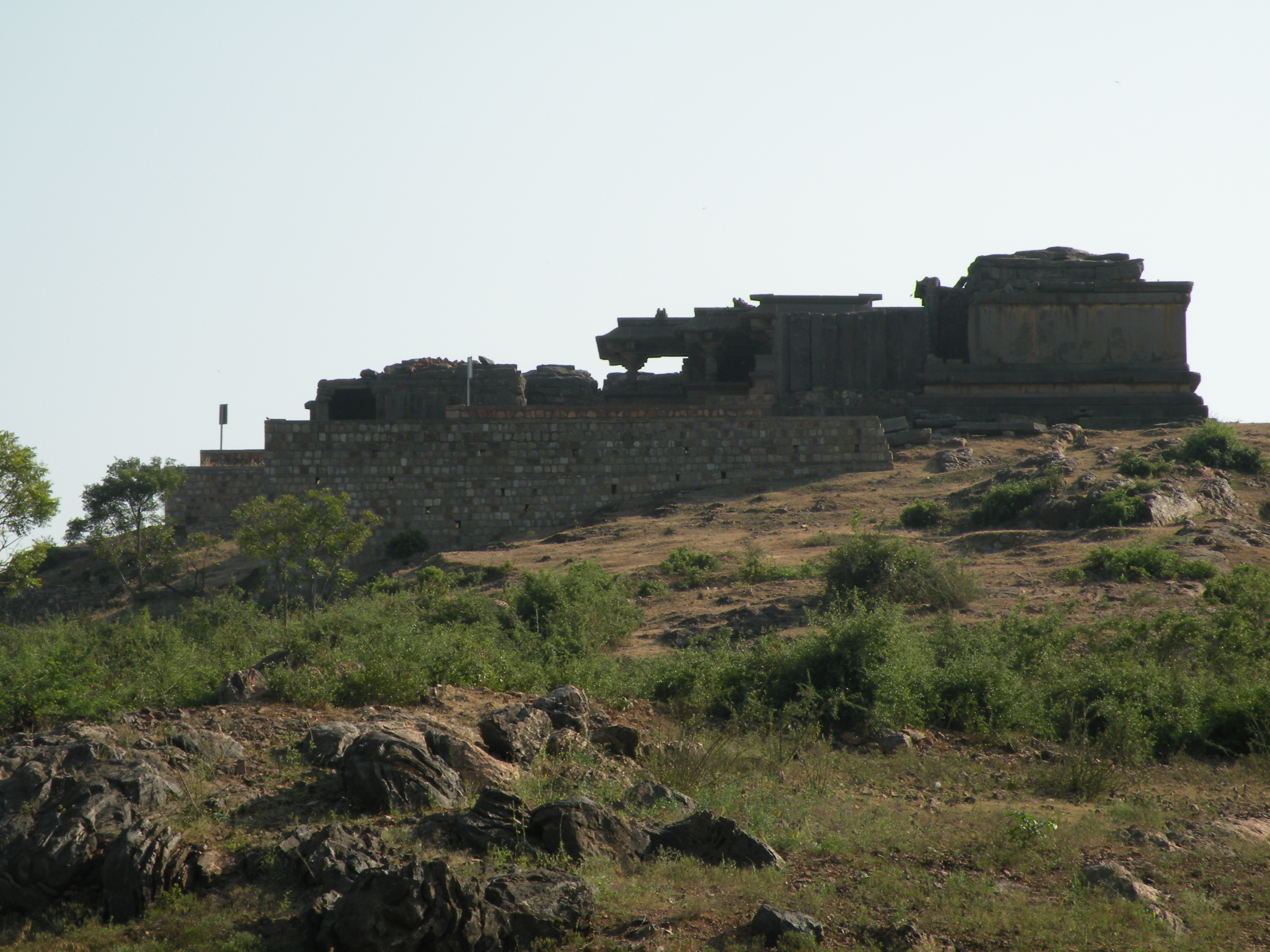
Jain Temple Ruins in Wakkund

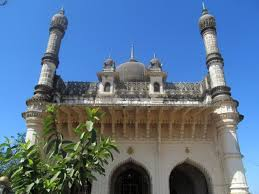

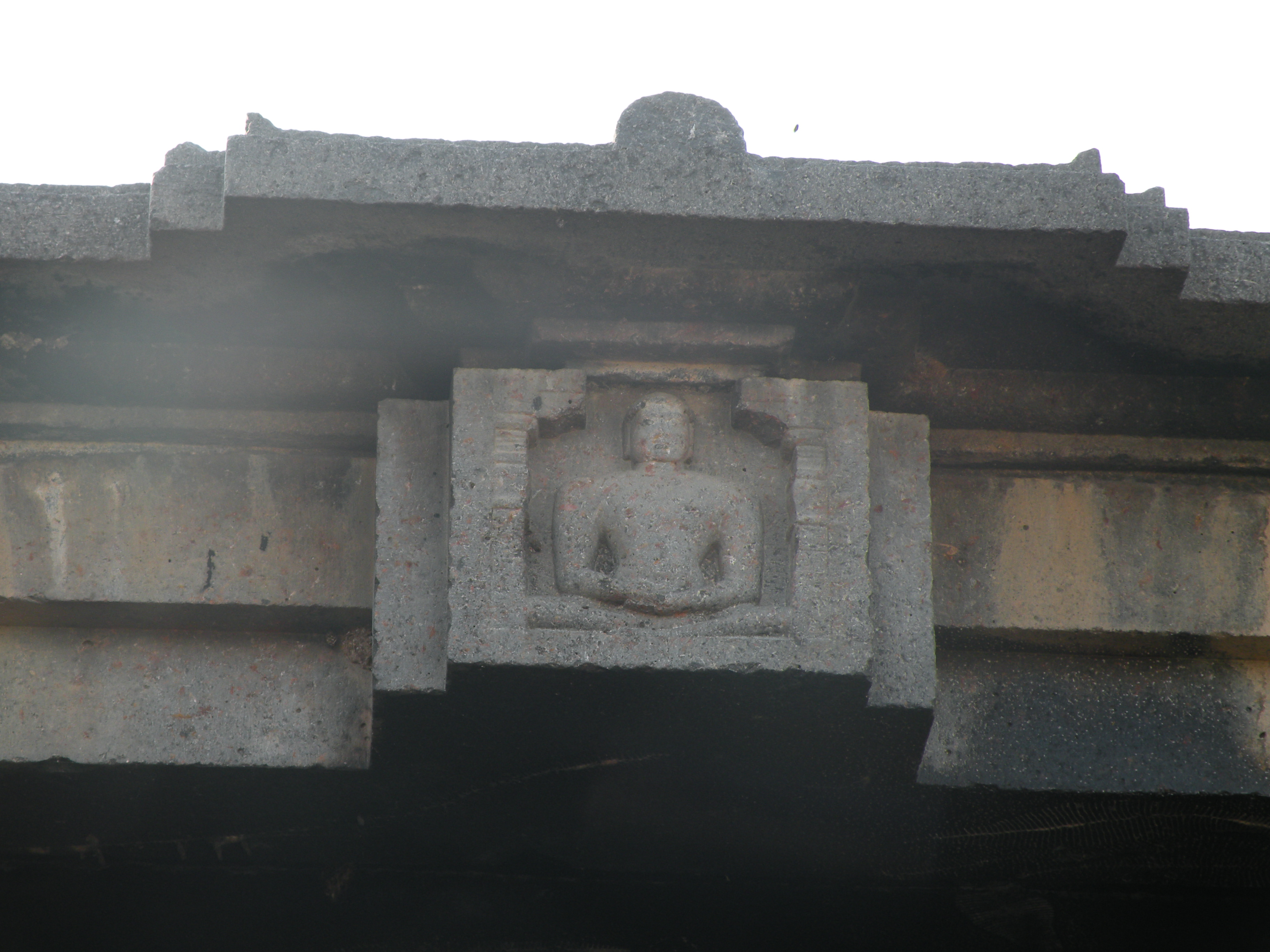

== Education ==
=== Schools and colleges ===
- M.J. High School – Municipal Jackson High School now renamed as M.S.S.R. All-Boys High School. (Co-education from 6th to 10th standard.)
- Maoulana Abulkalam Azad Urdu High School
- M.K.C.R. All-Girls High School – Municipal Kittur Rani Channamma Girls High School (only for girls only 8 th standard to 10th standard)
- SNVVS School – Sri Neelakanteshwar Vidya Vardhak Samsthe .
- KRCES School – Kittur Rani Channamma Education Society
- Kittur Rani Channamma International Residential Sainik School & PU College for Girls, Kittur, Bailhongal
- KLE Polytechnic College
- Kalpavruksha Model School – CBSC
- There are five Govt schools – Kannada Medium School and one Govt Schools – Urdu Medium School
- Ayurvedic Medical College and Research Center from SNVVS.
- BeD College from KRCES.
- Lot of pre-nursery schools (Prerana, KRCES, etc.).
- Arunodaya Vidya Samsthe I.T.I.
- Udaya Institute of Commerce & Computer (recognised by Karnataka Government, examinations conducted by K.S.E.E. Board, Bangalore)
- Bapuji Independent Arts and Commerce PU College
- Govt high school sutagatti
- B B ganachari primary and high school Marakumbi Bailhongal
- S.J.M.&S.B.M.K. PU College Indira Nagar Bailhongal.
- Government First Grade College for Women & PG centre, Hosur Road, Bailhongal.
- Government Independent Pre-university College, Bailhongal.
- SSR integrated Science PU college bailhongal
- kle independent pu college bailhongal
- Carmel vidya vikas school
- Government High school Anigol-Bailhongal

== Transportation ==
=== Road ===
Bailhongal is well connect by state highways one of the major highway from Belagavi to yallammanagudda is passed from bailhongal Transportation is provided by Karnataka State Road Transport Corporation buses as well as many prominent private buses which servers to all major destinations in Karnataka. The city has excellent connectivity with a number of major cities like Bengaluru, Pune, Mumbai, Belagavi . KSRTC provides bus service from Bailhongal to Belagavi every 15 minutes. Private buses are more preferred mode of transport due to its wider network and speed. Buses run by private companies are generally considered more comfortable and reliable, with most offering sleeper and air conditioned coaches.

=== Nearest railway stations ===
- Belagavi
- Dharward

Bailhongal has also proposal a new railway line between Belagavi to Dharwad via Bailhongal and Kittur. The distance is reduced by only 90 km and also connected to Belagavi, Badami, Bagalkot yia bailhongal. The project yet to be approved

=== Nearest airport ===
- Belagavi Airport at Sambra, which is the second oldest airport in North Karnataka after Bellary .

=== Nearest temples ===
- Kalagudi, Bailhongal
- Maradi Basaveswar Temple
- Shri Guru Madiwaleswar Math Bailhongal
- Hanuman Temple
- Sogal Someshwar Temple
- Shri Chidambar Temple, Murgod
- Murgod Shri Duradundeshwara Math
- Karimani Mallaya Temple and Shri Basaveshwar Temple Karimani, Shri Madiwal Machidev Math Karimani
- Sai Baba Temple
- Sri jodabasaveshara temple sutagatti
- Sri Sai Temple Bailhongal.
- Sri Danamma Devi Temple Bailhongal.
- Sri Raghavendra Temple Bailhongal
- Sri Jagdguru Shivanand Swamiji Math Bailhongal
- Sri Veerabhadreshwara Temple Belvadi
- Sri Pawad Basaveshwara Temple Sanikopp
- Sri Ramalingeswara Temple Anigol-Bailhongal
- Sri Ashwatha Laxmi Narasimha Temple M K Huballi
