= Belagavi district =

Belagavi district Belgaum district
- District
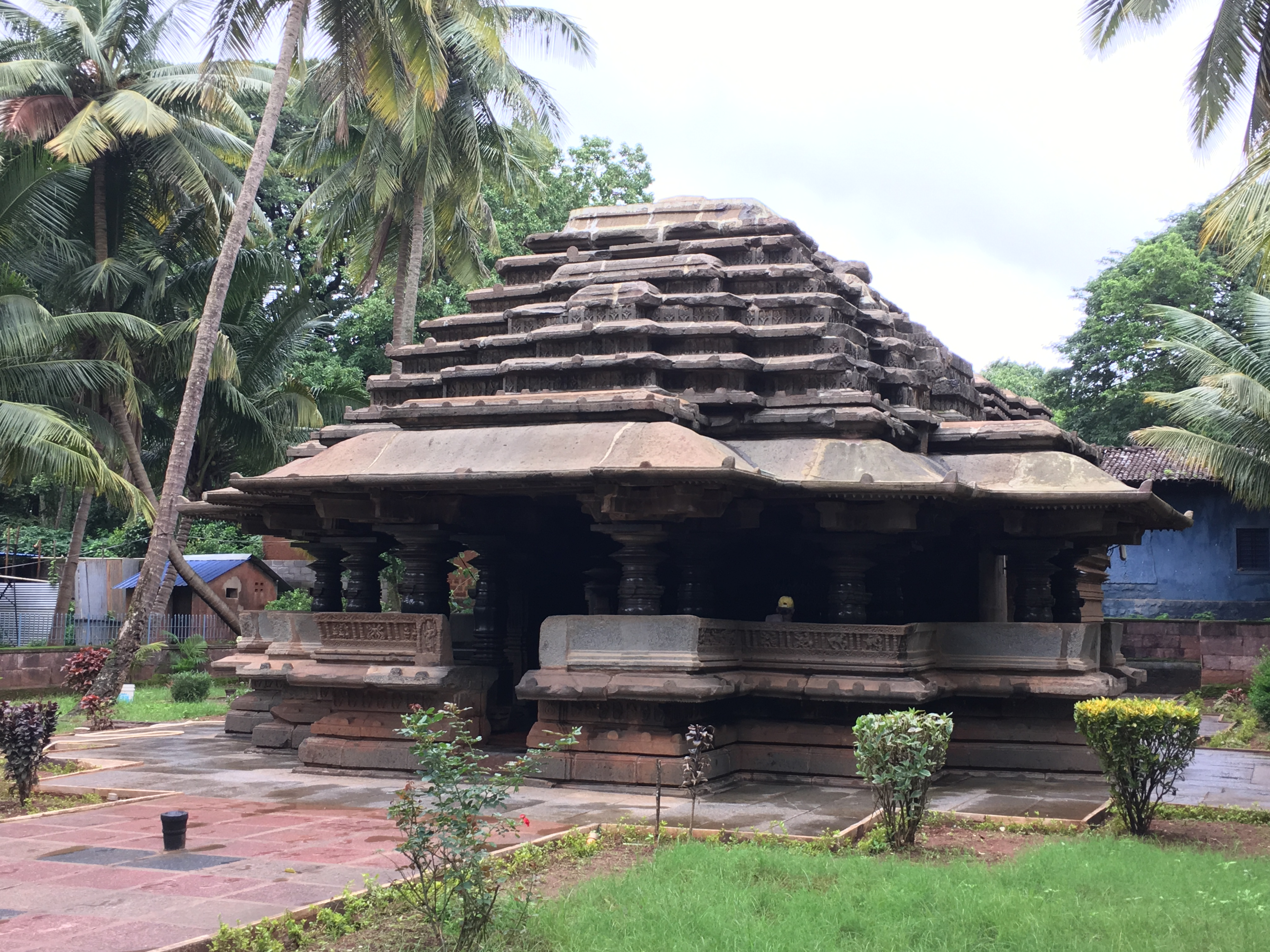
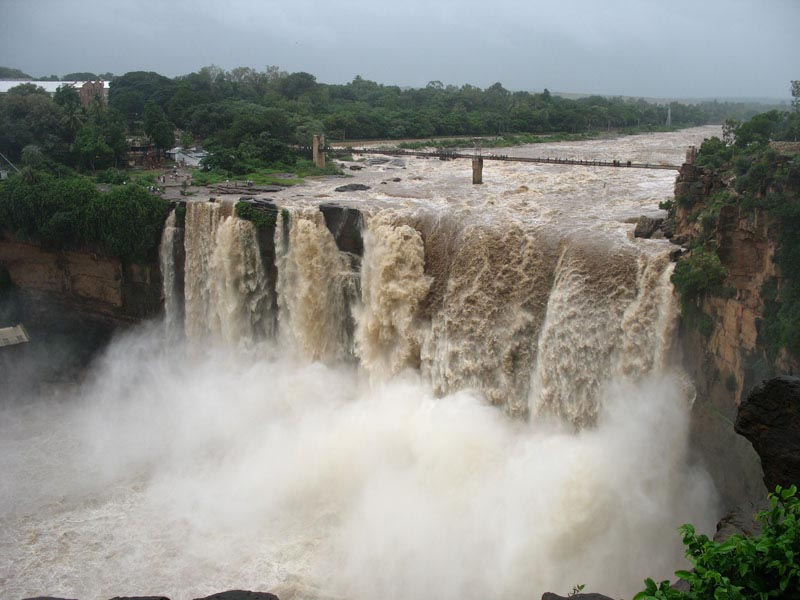
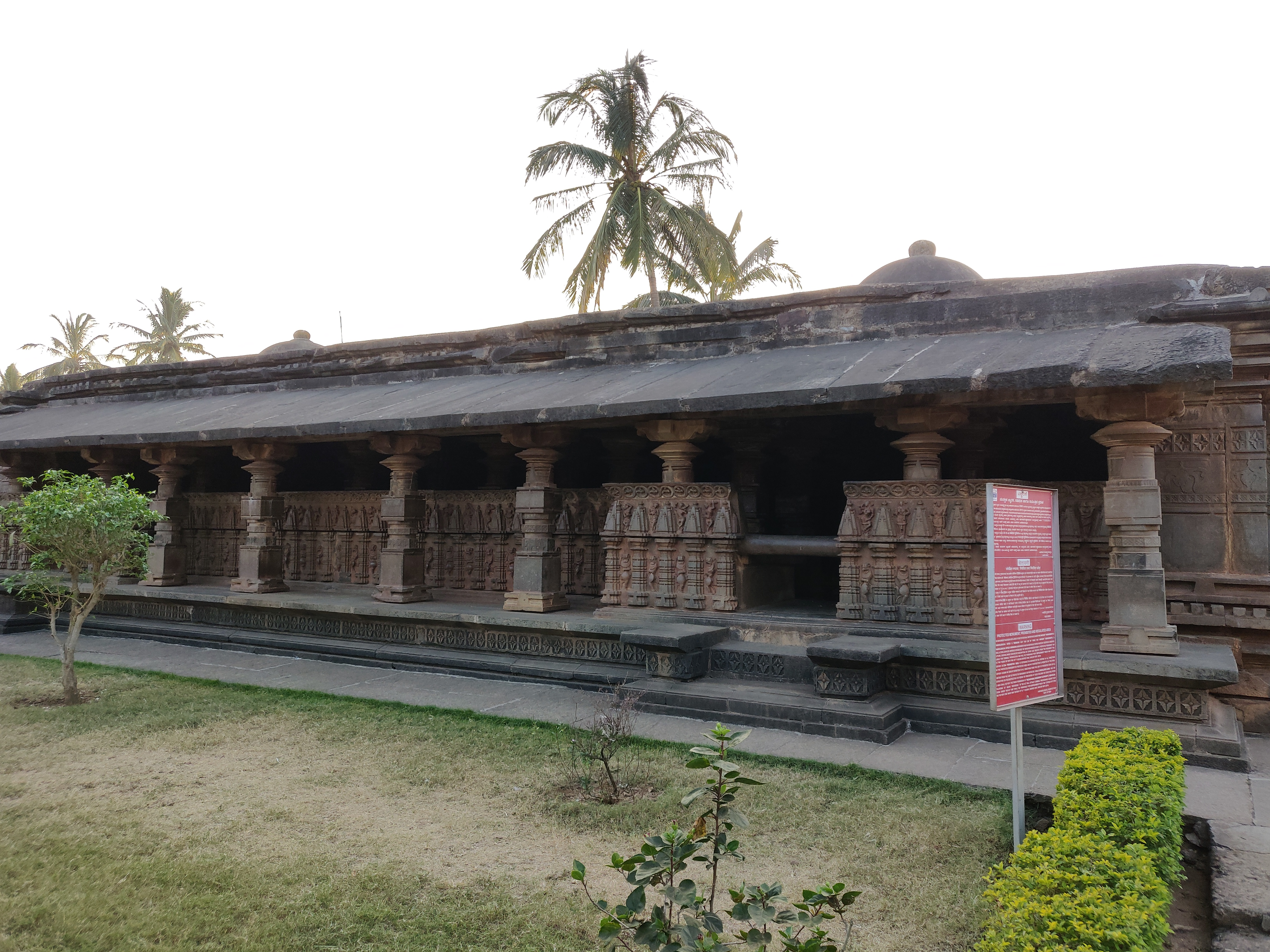
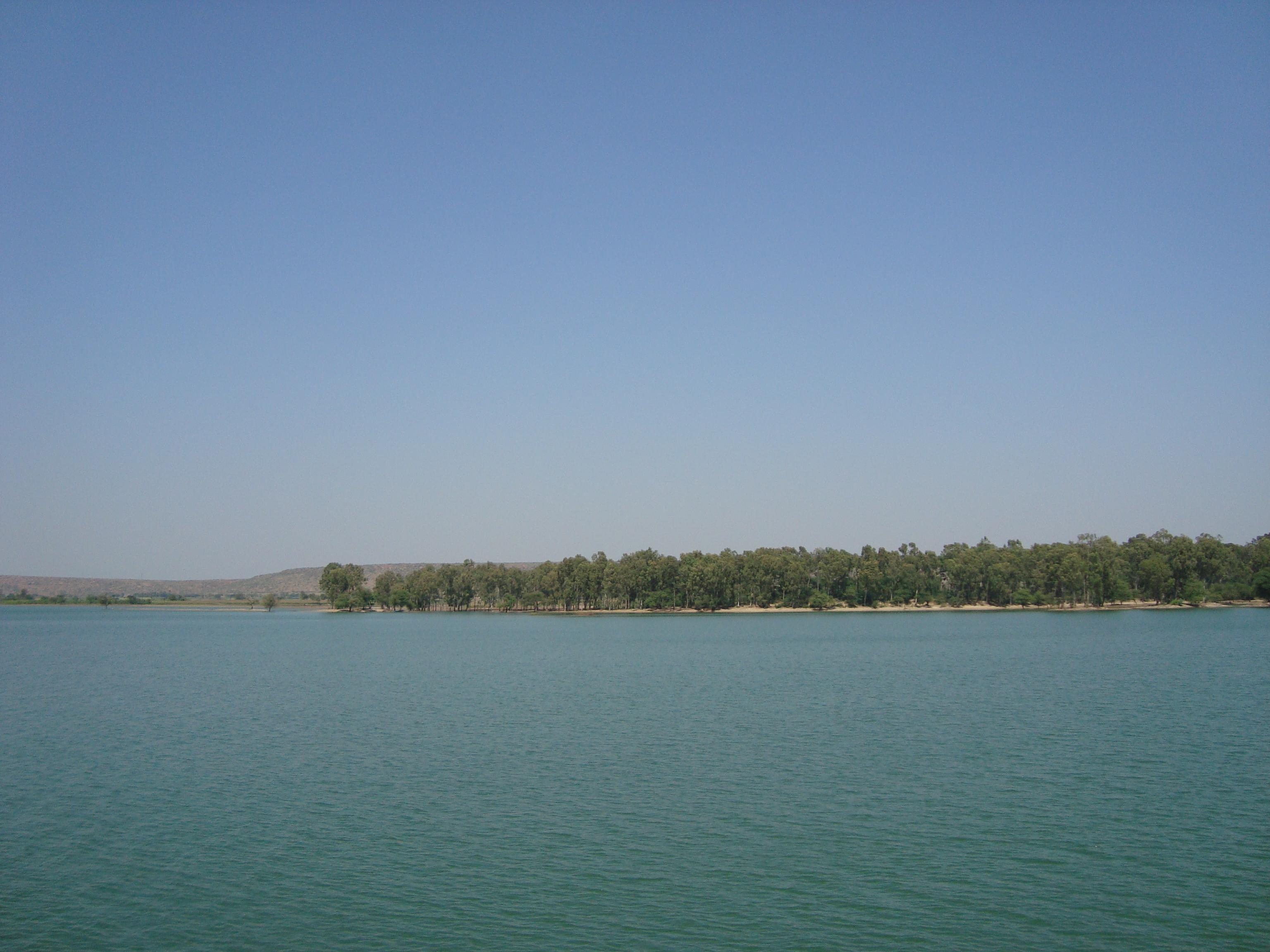
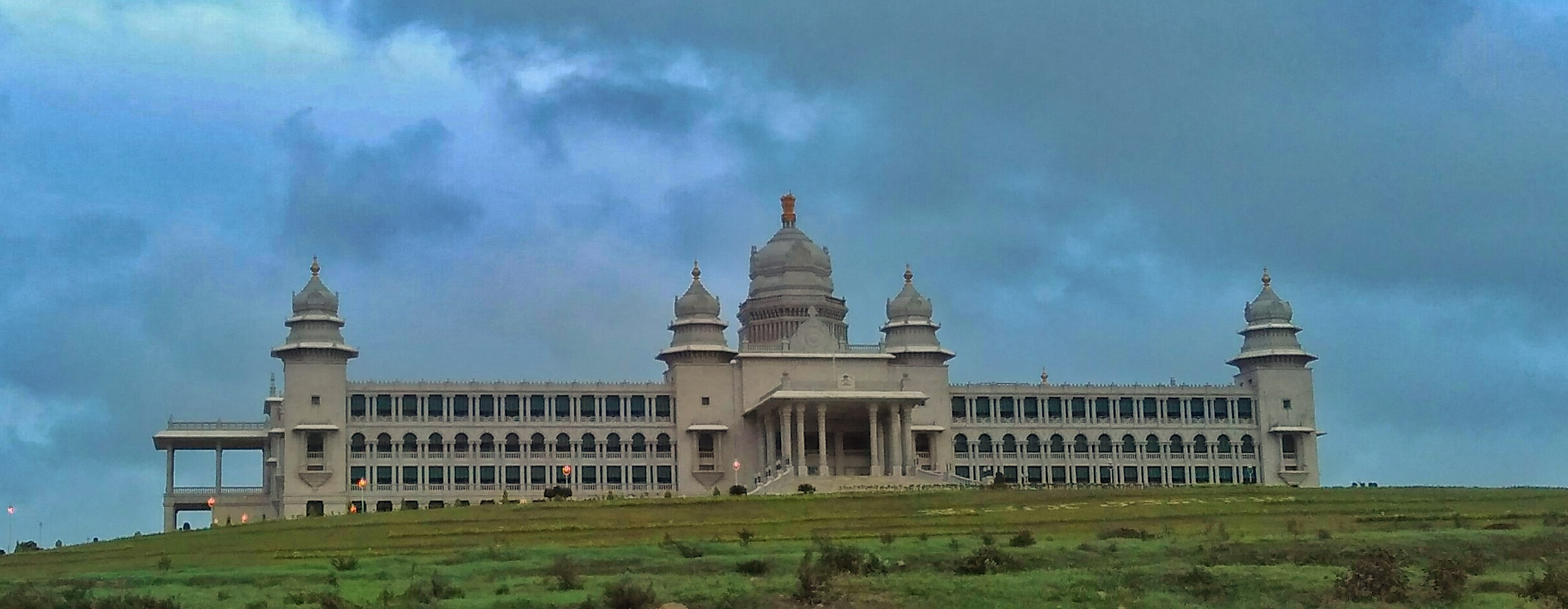
- Clockwise from top-right: Kamal Basadi in Belagavi Fort, Gokak Falls, Navilatirtha, Suvarna Vidhana Soudha, Kamala Narayana Temple
- Interactive map of Belagavi district
- Coordinates: 15.85°N 74.55°E
- Country: India
- State: Karnataka
- Division: Belagavi division
- Talukas: Belagavi, Nippani, Raybag, Athani , Ramdurg, Chikkodi, Kittur, Kagawad, Bailahongal, Gokak, Hukkeri, Mudalagi, Saundatti, Khanapur, Yaragatti
- Headquarters: Belgaum

Government
  - Deputy Commissioner (Collector): Mohammad Roshan
  - Police Commissioner (Urban): Borse Bhushan Gulabrao, IPS
  - Superintendent of Police (Rural): Bheemashankar S Guled

Area
  - Total: 13,415 km^{2} (5,180 sq mi)
  - Rank: 1st (31 districts)

Population (2011)
  - Total: 4,779,661
  - Density: 356.29/km^{2} (922.79/sq mi)
- Demonym(s): Belgaumites, Belagavians

Languages
  - Official: Kannada
- Time zone: UTC+5:30 (IST)
- ISO 3166 code: IN-KA
- Vehicle registration: Belgaum KA-22; Chikodi KA-23; Bailhongal KA-24; Gokak KA-49; Ramdurg KA-69; Athani KA-71
- Sex ratio: 1.04 ♂/♀
- Literacy: 64.2%
- Precipitation: 823 millimetres (32.4 in)
- Website: belagavi.nic.in

Belagavi district (Kannada ISO: Beḷagāvi, IPA: [beɭɐɡaːʋi]; Marathi ISO: Beḷagāṃva, IPA: [beɭɡaːũ]), formerly also known as Belgaum district, is a district in the state of Karnataka, India. The district is known as the sugar bowl of Karnataka with 150,000 hectares being used for commercial production. It has overtaken Mandya district in sugarcane production over the last decade. The city of Belgaum (Belagavi) is the district headquarters in Belagavi district. It houses the Second legislative building, where the Karnataka Legislature holds session once a year. The district is famous for its native sweet, Kunda. According to the 2011 Census of India, it has a population of 4,779,661, of which 24.03% live in urban areas, making it the second most populous district in Karnataka (out of 31), after Bangalore Urban. The district has an area of 13,415 km^{2} (5,180 sq mi), making it the largest district in terms of size in Karnataka It is bounded by Kolhapur District, Sangli district and on the north west by Sindhudurg district of Maharashtra state on the west and north, on the northeast by Bijapur district, on the east by Bagalkot district, on the southeast by Gadag district, on the south by Dharwad and Uttara Kannada districts, and on the southwest by the state of Goa.

== History ==
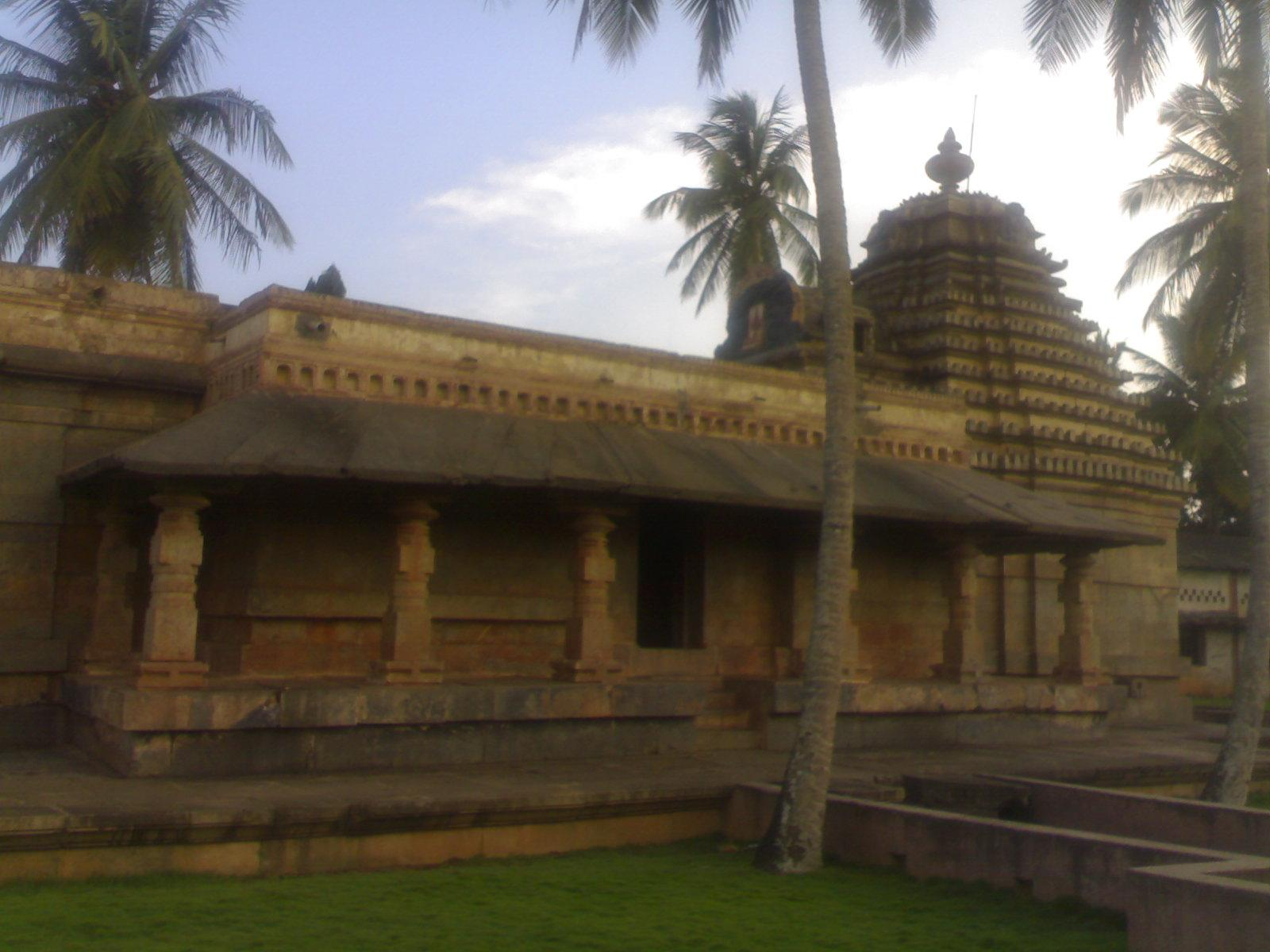
Bhuvaraha Narasimha temple Halasi, Karnataka

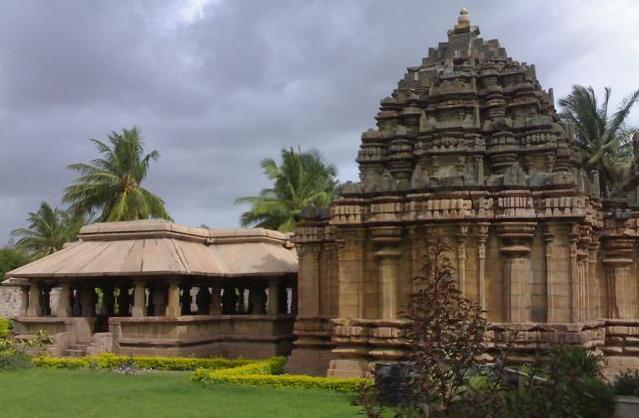
Panchalingeshwara temple Hooli

The original name of the town of Belgaum was Venugrama, meaning Bamboo Village. It is also known as Malnad Pradesh. The most ancient place in the district is Halsi; and this, according to inscriptions on copper plates discovered in its neighbourhood, was once the capital of a dynasty of nine Kadamba kings. It appears that from the middle of the 6th century to about 760 the area was held by the Chalukyas, who were succeeded by the Rashtrakutas. After the break-up of the Rashtrakuta dynasty a portion of it survived in the Rattas (875–1250), who from 1210 onward made Venugrama their capital. Inscriptions give evidence of a long struggle between the Rattas and the Kadambas of Goa, who succeeded in the latter years of the 12th century in acquiring and holding part of the district. By 1208, however, the Kadambas had been overthrown by the Rattas, who in their turn succumbed to the Yadavas of Devagiri in 1250. After the overthrow of the Yadavas by the Delhi Sultanate (1320), Belgaum was for a short time under the rule of the latter; but only a few years later the part south of the Ghataprabha River was subject to the Hindu rajas of Vijayanagara. In 1347 the northern part was conquered by the Bahmani Sultanate, which in 1473 took the town of Belgaum and conquered the southern part also. When Aurangzeb overthrew the Bijapura sultans in 1686, Belgaum passed to the Mughals. In 1776 the country was overrun by Hyder Ali of Mysore, but was taken by the Madhavrao Peshwa . In 1818 it was handed over to the British East India Company, and was made part of the district of Dharwar. In 1836 this was divided into two parts, the northern district becoming Belgaum.

Yadur is situated beside the Krishna River, and there is a famous Veerbhadra temple there. Many devotees visit the area from Karnataka and Maharashtra. Hooli is one of the oldest villages in Belgaum district. There are many Chalukya temples in the village, including the famous Panchaligeswara temple.

Kittur in Belgaum district is a place of historical importance. Rani Chennamma of Kittur (1778–1829) is known for her resistance to British rule.

The British had a sizeable infantry post here, having realised the military importance of its geographic location. It is one of the reasons for Belgaum's sobriquet The Cradle of Infantry. Development of a rail network for the movement of resources and later troops was one of the means employed by both the British East India Company and the British to exert control over India. Belgaum's railway station, the Mahatma Gandhi Railway Station was established by the British. A signboard declaring the sobriquet can be seen hung on Platform 1 at the station.

=== Border dispute ===
After India became independent in 1947, the Belagavi district (which was in the erstwhile Bombay Presidency) became a part of the Bombay State. In 1948, the Belgaum Municipality that was dominated by Marathi speaking politicians requested the Indian Dominion, Indian Constituent Assembly, and the Boundary Commission to include the Belgaum Municipal district in the proposed Samyukta Maharashtra state for the Marathi speakers.

In accordance with the established policy of bifurcation on a linguistic majority basis, in 1956, the Belgaum district was incorporated into the newly formed Mysore state (now Karnataka) with the passage of the States Reorganization Act, adjoining areas that had a majority of Marathi speaking citizens were included in the newly formed Maharashtra state.

== Geography ==
=== Water bodies ===
List of rivers flowing through Belgaum District

- Krishna
- Malaprabha
- Ghataprabha
- Mahadayi
- Pandari
- Hiranyakeshi

== Demographics ==
Historical population
Year	Pop.	±% p.a.
1901	1,131,186	—
1911	1,083,804	−0.43%
1921	1,088,763	+0.05%
1931	1,237,223	+1.29%
1941	1,410,054	+1.32%
1951	1,645,620	+1.56%
1961	1,983,498	+1.88%
1971	2,422,994	+2.02%
1981	2,978,913	+2.09%
1991	3,583,606	+1.87%
2001	4,214,505	+1.63%
2011	4,779,661	+1.27%

According to the 2011 census Belagavi district has a population of 4,779,661, roughly equal to the nation of Singapore or the US state of Alabama. This gives it a ranking of 25th in India (out of a total of 640). The district has a population density of 356 inhabitants per square kilometre (920/sq mi). Its population growth rate over the decade 2001–2011 was 13.38%. There were 969 females for every 1000 males, and a literacy rate of 73.94%. 25.34% of the population lives in urban areas. Scheduled Castes and Scheduled Tribes make up 12.08% and 6.22% of the population respectively.

Religions in Belagavi district (2011)
Religion	Percent
Hinduism	84.49%
Islam	11.06%
Jainisim	3.73%
Other or not stated	0.72%

Hindus are the biggest religion in the district with 84.49% of the population. Muslims are the second-largest with 11.06% and Jains are 3.73%.

Languages of Belagavi district (2011)
1. Kannada (68.4%)
2. Marathi (18.7%)
3. Urdu (9.79%)
4. Others (3.10%)

At the time of the 2011 census, 68.40% of the population spoke Kannada, 18.70% Marathi and 9.79% Urdu as their first language.

== Government and politics ==
=== Administrative divisions ===
The administration of Belgaum district has been divided into 15 taluks.

- Belgaum
- Bailhongal
- Chikkodi
- Gokak
- Hukkeri
- Raybag
- Ramdurg
- Athani
- Saundatti
- Khanapur
- Kittur
- Nippani
- Kagawad
- Mudalagi
- Yaragatti

Athani taluk is the largest with an area of 1,997.70 km^{2} and Raybag taluk is the smallest with an area of 958.8 km^{2}. The district comprises three revenue sub-divisions headquartered at Belgaum, Bailhongal and Chikodi governed by an assistant commissioner and taluks headed by Tehsildar and has six police sub-divisions. Apart from the Belgaum City Corporation, there are 17 municipalities, 20 towns, 485 gram panchayats, 1,138 inhabited villages and 26 non-inhabited villages.

==== Villages ====
- Karwaish
- Kochari

== Industry ==
The district has seven industrial areas, one special economic zone (SEZ) (India's first precision engineering SEZ with more than 200 acres) and 16 industrial estates. The city's industrial growth begin when Babu Rao Pusalkar set up a small unit in city over a century ago and that transformed Belgaum city into foundry and hydraulics base.

Name of Industrial Area	Extent (acres)
Kanbargi Auto Complex	267.00
Kakati	74.75
Honaga	209.5
Kangrali	58.59
Gokak	109.05
Kittur	433.19
Kanagala	848.00

Name of Industrial Estate	Extent (acres)
Udyambag	55.15
Udyambag Tq. Karigarika Sangh	0.32
Angol- 1	21
Angol- 2	4.6
Kanbargi	6
Khanapur	9.57
Gokak	9.62
Chikkodi	6
Bailhongal	3
Ramdurg	9.4
Nippani	3.5
Kangrali	2.5
Desur	41.34
Athani	28
Borgaon	75
Kagwad	20

List of industrial clusters in Belgaum district that are identified by Ministry of Micro, Small and Medium Enterprises

Cluster place	Cluster activity
Belgaum	Foundry, Powerloom and artisan activities like Dolls & Toys, Horn & Bone, Metalware, Artistic Chappals by hand
Angol	Wooden Furniture Cluster
Udyambag	Machine Tool and Engineering Cluster
Kudachi	Kudachi Jaggery Cluster
Madhabavi	Foot Diamond Leather Cluster
Ramdurg	Readymade Garments Cluster, Birds Power loom Cluster
Chikkodi	Jaggery processing Cluster
Khanapur	Bricks Processing Cluster, Pottery & Clay, Terracotta, Textiles Hand Embroidered
Athani	Athani Raisins processing cluster
Gokak	Dolls & Toys

== Education ==
Belgaum district is a home to three universities: Visvesvaraya Technological University, Rani Channamma University, Belagavi and KLE University. Also, it has a nine engineering colleges, two medical colleges, two dental colleges, 15 polytechnics, 7 Indian system of medical colleges, and 180 degree colleges.

== Notable people ==
- Suresh Angadi - Former Railway Minister
- S. Ballesh – Shehnai artist
- Hemant Birje – actor
- Phadeppa Dareppa Chaugule – India's first Olympic marathon runner
- Kittur Rani Chennamma – freedom fighter and queen of Kittur
- Gangadharrao Deshpande – activist
- Kumar Gandharva – classical singer
- Balappa Hukkeri – singer
- Satish Jarkiholi - Indian National Congress politician, Minister of Public Works Department in Government of Karnataka
- Shamba Joshi – writer
- Kaka Kalelkar (1885–1981) – independence activist
- Chandrashekhara Kambara – poet
- Basavaraj Kattimani – writer, novelist
- Laxmanrao Kirloskar – businessman
- Betageri Krishnasharma – writer
- Atul Kulkarni – actor
- Sudheendra Kulkarni – Indian politician, Columnist
- Shirasangi Lingaraj – provincial ruler
- Panth Maharaj – Hindu yogi
- Belawadi Mallamma – warrior queen
- Ronit More – cricketer
- Renukamma Murugodu – actress
- Pramod Muthalik – chief of Sri Ram Sena, politician
- Bandu Patil – hockey player
- V. L. Patil - politician, industrialist, and freedom fighter
- D. C. Pavate – Indian Mathematician
- Charan Raj – Indian actor
- Sangolli Rayanna – freedom fighter
- Raja Lakhamagouda Sardesai – ruler of Vantmuri princely state
- Laxman Savadi - Deputy Chief Minister of Karnataka
- Acharya Shantisagar – Jain Digambara monk
- Shri Thanedar – Indian-American politician, businessman, scientist
- Acharya Vidyasagar – Jain Digambara monk

== Publications ==
- Belgaum district gazetteer (1905) by Reginald Edward Enthoven
- Belgaum district gazetteer (1987) by Suryanath U. Kamath.
- Belgaum by James Macnabb Campbell (2004)
