= North Karnataka =

Region in Karnataka, India

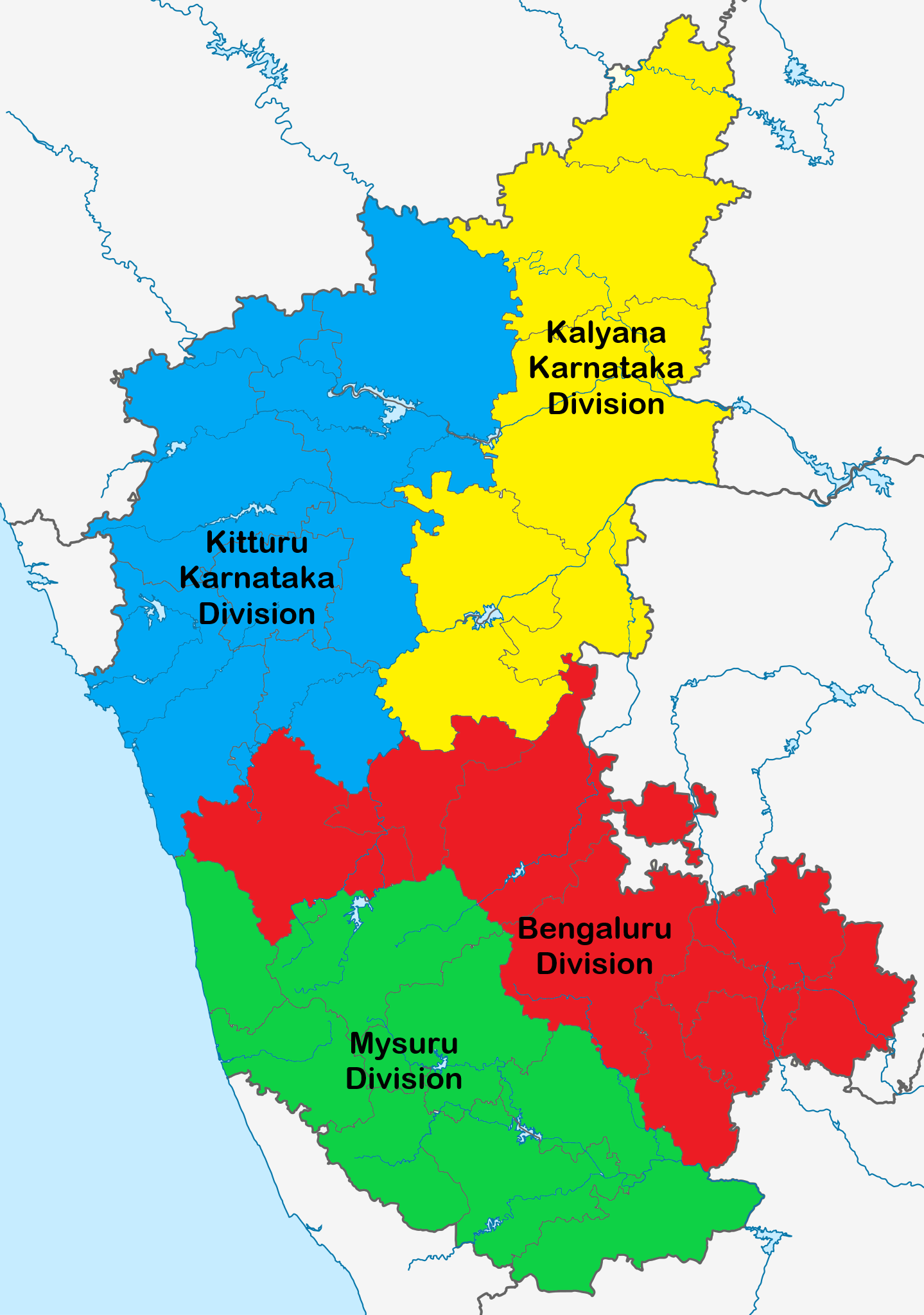
- Location of North Karnataka in Karnataka
- Coordinates: 16°N 76°E
- Country: India
- State: Karnataka
- Belagavi division districts: Bagalkot district; Bijapur district; Gadag district; Dharwad district; Uttara Kannada district; Haveri district; Belagavi district
- Kalaburagi division districts: Bellary district; Bidar district; Kalaburagi district; Koppal district; Raichur district; Vijayanagar district; Yadgir district

Government
  - Type: Zilla Panchayat

Area
  - Total: 88,361 km^{2} (34,116 sq mi)
  - Rank: 1st: Karnataka
- Elevation: 500 m (1,600 ft)

Population (2011)
  - Total: 24,571,229
  - Rank: 2nd: Karnataka
  - Density: 278.08/km^{2} (720.22/sq mi)
- Demonym: Uttara Karnatakadavaru

Languages
  - Official: Kannada
- Time zone: UTC+5:30 (IST)
- Vehicle registration: KA
- Largest City: Hubli–Dharwad
- Sex ratio: 960 ♂/♀
- Literacy: 70%

North Karnataka (Transliteration: Uttara Karnataka), is a geographical region in Deccan Plateau from 300 to 730 metres (980 to 2,400 ft) elevation that constitutes the north region of the Karnataka state in India and the region consists of 14 districts. It is drained by the Krishna River and its tributaries the Bhima, Ghataprabha, Malaprabha, and Tungabhadra. North Karnataka lies within the Deccan thorn scrub forests ecoregion, which extends north into eastern Maharashtra.

North Karnataka consists of total 14 districts and comprises the regions known as (Kalyan-Karnataka) – Kalaburagi division and (Kittur-Karnataka) – Belagavi division. It includes districts of Bagalkote, Bijapur, Gadag, Dharwad, Haveri, Uttara kannada, Belagavi, Bellary, Bidar, Kalaburagi, Koppal, Raichur, Vijayanagara, Yadgir.

== Transport ==
=== Bus ===
- North Western Karnataka Road Transport Corporation NWKRTC, serves the north western part of Karnataka.
- Kalyana Karnataka Road Transport Corporation KKRTC, serves the north eastern part of Karnataka

=== Air ===
Airports in the region are

- Belgaum Airport
- Hubli Airport
- Jindal Vijayanagar Airport
- Bidar Airport
- Kalaburagi Airport

== Airlines and destinations ==
Airlines	Destinations	Refs.
Alliance Air	Bangalore, Pune	
SpiceJet	Bangalore, Indira Gandhi International Airport Delhi,Hyderabad, Mumbai, Mangalore, Jabalpur	
Star Air	Bangalore, Ahmedabad, Mumbai	
Trujet	Mysore (begins 27 October)	

Belgaum Airport (IATA: IXG, ICAO: VOBM) is an airport in Belgaum, a city in the Indian state of Karnataka. Built in 1942 by the Royal Air Force (RAF), Belgaum Airport is the oldest airport in North Karnataka. The RAF used the airport as a training site during World War II, providing support to the South East Asia Command. Because of its location in the village of Sambra, 10 kilometres (6.2 mi) east of Belgaum, the airport is also known as the Sambra airport. The new terminal building was inaugurated by Civil aviation minister Ashok Gajapathi Raju on 14 September 2017. The airport is also home to an Indian Air Force station at which new recruits to the military receive basic training.

Hubli Airport (IATA: HBX, ICAO: VOHB)] is a domestic airport serving the twin cities of Hubli and Dharwad in the state of Karnataka, India. It is situated on Gokul Road, 8 kilometres from Hubli and 20 kilometres (12 mi) from Dharwad.The airline from Hubli is well connected with Bangalore, Mumbai, Ahmedabad and Hyderabad. Hubli airport will be upgraded to international airport. Around 700 acres of land acquisition is under process and 245 crores have been already released for acquisition.

== History of North Karnataka ==
Center of Western Chalukya architectural activity in modern Karnataka, India

=== Prehistoric period ===
North Karnataka's history and culture date back to prehistoric times. The earliest Stone Age find in India was a hand ax at Lingasugur, in Raichur district. Sangankal Hills in the Bellary district, which is known as the earliest village settlement of South India, dates back to the Neolithic period. Iron weapons from 1200 BC, found at Hallur in Dharwad district, demonstrate that North Karnataka used iron earlier than northern India. Prehistoric sites in North Karnataka include rock shelters in Bellary, Raichur and Koppal districts with red paintings which include figures of wild animals. The paintings are done in such a way that the walls of caves are not facing northwest, so the northwest monsoon does not affect them. These rock shelters are found at Kurugodu in Bellary district, Hampi in Vijayanagara district and Hire Benakal, near Gangavati in the Koppal district. Burial chambers using granite slabs (known as dolmens) are also found; the best examples are the dolmens of Hire Benakal and Kumati in Hadagali Taluk.

Vibhuthihalli at Shahapur Taluk in the Yadgir district, an Archaeological Survey of India ancient astronomy site, was created with megalithic stones. The stones, arranged in a square pattern with astronomical significance, cover an area of 12 acres (4.9 ha). Ashoka's stone edicts, found in the state, indicate that major parts of Northern Karnataka were under the Mauryas. Many dynasties left their imprint upon the development of North Karnatakan art, among them the Chalukyas, the Vijayanagara Empire and the Western Chalukyas. The inscriptions related to Chutu dynasty are the oldest documents found in North Karnataka.

=== Ancient ===
- Karnata Kingdom
- Mauryas
- Shatavahana dynasty (until early third century CE)
- Chutus of Banavasi (vassal to the Satavahanas)
- Kurus of Belgaum of 30 BC-65/70 AD.

=== Chalukyas ===
Extent of the Badami Chalukya Empire, 636–740 CE

Chalukya rule is important in the development of architecture known as Karnata Dravida. Hundreds of monuments built by the Chalukyas are found in the Malaprabha river basin (mainly in Aihole, Badami, Pattadakal and Mahakuta, in Karnataka). They ruled an empire extending from the Kaveri in the south to the Narmada River in the north. The Badami Chalukya dynasty was established by Pulakeshin I in 543; Vatapi (Badami) was the capital. Pulakeshin II was a popular emperor of the Badami Chalukya dynasty. He defeated Harshavardhana on the banks of the Narmada River, and defeated Vishnukundins in the south. Vikramaditya I, known as Rajamalla and for building temples, engraved a Kannada inscription on the victory pillar at the Kailasanatha Temple. Kirtivarman II was the last Badami Chalukya king, overthrown in 753 by the Rashtrakuta King Dantidurga.

Extent of the Western Chalukya Empire, 1121 CE

The Western Chalukya dynasty is sometimes called the Kalyani Chalukyas, after its regal capital at Kalyani (today's Basavakalyan in Karnataka) or the Later Chalukya from its theoretical relationship to the sixth-century Badami Chalukyas. The Western Chalukyas (Kannada: ಪಶ್ಚಿಮ ಚಾಲುಕ್ಯ ಸಾಮ್ರಾಜ್ಯ) developed an architectural style (also called Gadag style) known today as a transitional style, an architectural link between the early Chalukya dynasty and the later Hoysala empire. The Chalukyas built some of the earliest Hindu temples in India. The best-known examples are the Mahadeva Temple (Itagi) in the Koppal District; the Kasivisvesvara Temple at Lakkundi in the Gadag District and the Mallikarjuna Temple at Kuruvatti and the Kallesvara Temple at Bagali, both in the Davangere District. Monuments notable for craftsmanship are the Siddhesvara Temple at Haveri in the Haveri District, the Amrutesvara Temple at Annigeri in the Dharwad District, the Sarasvati Temple in Gadag, and the Dodda Basappa Temple at Dambal (both in the Gadag district). Aihole was an experimental base for architectural creation.

Badami Chalukyas and Kalyana chalukyas also known as (Kuntaleshvaras).

=== Kadambas ===
Extent of Kadamba Empire, 500 CE

The Kadambas (Kannada: ಕದಂಬರು) were an ancient dynasty of South India who primarily ruled the region which is the present-day Goa state and the nearby Konkan region (part of modern Maharashtra and Karnataka state). The early rulers of this dynasty established themselves at Vaijayanti (or Banavasi) in 345 AD and ruled for more than two centuries. In 607, the Chalukyas of Vatapi sacked Banavasi, and the Kadamba kingdom was incorporated into the expanding Chalukyan empire. In the eighth century, the Chalukyas were overthrown by the Rashtrakutas, who ruled until the 10th century. In 980, descendants of the Chalukyas and Kadambas revolted against the Rashtrakutas; the Rashtrakuta empire fell, resulting in the establishment of a second Chalukyan dynasty (known as the Western Chalukyas). Chatta Deva, a member of the Kadamba family who helped the Western Chalukyas in this coup, re-established the Kadamba dynasty. He was primarily a vassal of the Western Chalukyas, but his successors enjoyed considerable independence and were well-placed in Goa and Konkan until the 14th century. The successors of Chatta Deva occupied both Banavasi and Hangal, and are known as the Kadambas of Hangal. Later, the Kadambas paid nominal allegiance to the other major powers of the Deccan Plateau (such as the Yadavas and Hoysalas of Dorasamudra) and maintained their independence. Four families of Kadambas ruled in southern India: the Kadamba of Hangal, Goa, Belur and Banvasi.

=== Rashtrakutas ===
Rashtrakuta empire of Manyakheta (Malkhed, in Gulbarga district), eighth century

During the rule of Dantidurga, an empire was built with the Gulbarga region in modern Karnataka as its base. This clan came to be known as the Rashtrakutas of Manyakheta (Kannada: ರಾಷ್ಟ್ರಕೂಟ), who rose to power in 753. During their rule, Jain mathematicians and scholars contributed important works in Kannada and Sanskrit. Amoghavarsha I was the best-known king of this dynasty and wrote Kavirajamarga, a landmark Kannada work. Architecture reached a high-water mark in the Dravidian style, the best examples of which are seen in the Kailash Temple at Ellora, the sculptures of Elephanta Caves in modern-day Maharashtra and the Kashivishvanatha and the Jain Narayana Temples at Pattadakal in modern North Karnataka (all of which are UNESCO World Heritage Sites). Scholars agree that the kings of the imperial dynasty in the eighth to tenth century made the Kannada language as important as Sanskrit. Rashtrakuta inscriptions appear in both Kannada and Sanskrit, and the kings encouraged literature in both languages. The earliest existing Kannada literary writings are credited to their court poets and royalty. Kailash Temple is an example of Dravidian art. This project was started by Krishna I (757–773) of the Rashtrakuta dynasty which ruled from Manyakheta in modern Karnataka. It is located 40 km from the city of Manyakheta (modern Malkhed), on the banks of the Kagini River in Kalaburagi district.

=== Vijayanagara Empire ===
Vijayanagara (Karnata Empire, or Karnataka Empire) is considered the greatest medieval Hindu empire and one of the greatest in the world at that time. It fostered the development of intellectual pursuits and the fine arts. Abdur Razzaq (the Persian ambassador) said, "The eye of the pupil has never seen a place like it and the ear of intelligence has never been informed that there existed anything to equal it in the world".

=== Deccan Sultanates ===
The Vijayanagara Empire, with its capital at Hampi, lost to the army of the Deccan Sultanates in 1565. As a consequence of this, Bijapur became the most important city of the region. It is a land of monuments; perhaps no other city except Delhi has as many monuments as Bijapur.

=== Maratha Empire ===
The region of North Karnataka, especially Belgaum, Dharwad and parts of Bagalkot, Bijapur and Gulbarga districts came under the influence of Shivaji and subsequently the Peshwas. As early as 1680s, many Marathi communities including Marathas and Marathi Brahmin started settling in the region. Most of these came down as soldiers and administrators and were awarded large grants of land. The Patwardhan family of Jamkhandi and Bijapur, Desai of Nuggikeri and Kundgol and Deshpande families in Dharwad, Belgaum and neighboring districts are some of the prominent Brahmin families which trace their ancestry to these migrations. While many of these families adopted to Kannada language, most people remain bilingual and marry into Marathi Brahmin families. The Ghorpade dynasty in Sandur State and Mudhol State are some of the prominent Maratha families who trace their ancestry to similar migrations.

=== Minor dynasties ===
- Rattas of Saundatti (of Belgaum)
- Guttas of Guttal (Dharwad region)
- Sendrakas of Nagarkhanda (Banavasi province)
- Sindas of Yalaburga (Bijapur-Gulbarga)
- Kadamba of Hangal
- Naiks of Kanakagiri
- Shilahara

=== Other kingdoms ===
- Seuna Yadavas of Devagiri, 9th–14th century
- Ratta dynasty
- Kalachuris of Kalyani, 12th century
- Kampili, 13th century
- Sangama dynasty
- Saluva dynasty

=== Inscriptions ===
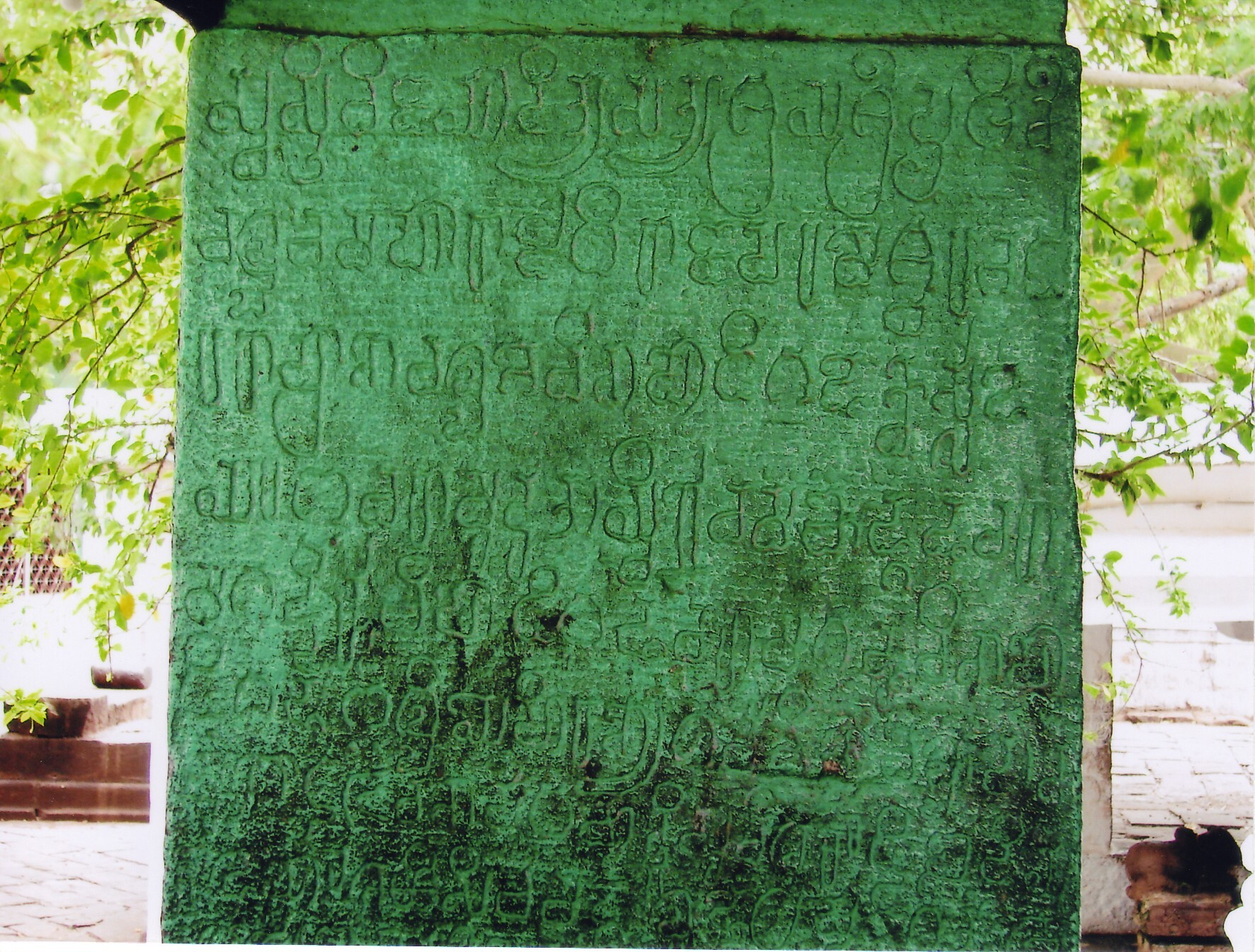
Seventh-century Kannada inscription at Mahakuta (Mahakutesvara temple)

- Mahakuta Inscriptions, Mahakuta Mahakutesvara temple Pillar inscription
- Aihole inscription
- Badami inscriptions
- Kappe Arabhatta inscription
- Itagi Mahadeva Temple Inscription
- Lakkundi inscriptions
- Gadag inscription
- Halasi inscriptions

=== Princely states ===
The following are the princely states of British India:

- Mudhol State
- Sandur State
- Savanur State
- Ramdurg State
- Jamkhandi State
- Kittur
- Shorapur
- Gurgunta
- Gajendragad shivaji fort
- Kannada-speaking Hyderabad State
- South Kannada-speaking Bombay state

=== Battles ===
- Chalukya Pallava Wars
- Battle of Talikota
- Battle of Gajendragad
- Battle of Raichur
- Chola-Chalukya wars

=== Historic capitals ===
- Palashika (Halasi, or Halsi, or Halshi in Belgaum district) – Kadamba of Halasi
- Hanungal, or Panungal (Hangal in Haveri district) – Kadambas of Hangal
- Kadamba of Banavasi
- Aihole in Bagalkot district – First capital of Badami Chalukyas
- Vatapi (Badami in Bagalkot district) – Badami Chalukyas
- Pattadakal in Bagalkot district – Briefly third capital of Badami Chalukyas
- Mayurkhandi in Bidar district – First capital of Rashtrakuta dynasty
- Manyakheta (Malkhed in Kalaburagi district) – Rashtrakuta dynasty
- Kalyani (Basava Kalyana in Bidar district) – Western Chalukyas
- Kundal (Kundal village near sangli in Sangli district) – Western Chalukyas
- Annigeri in Dharwad district – Western Chalukyas (last capital of the Chalukyas)
- Sudi in Gadag district – Coin mint and capital of Western Chalukyas
- Lakkundi in Gadag district – Coin mint of Western Chalukyas
- Vijayanagara (Hampi in Bellary district) – Vijayanagara Empire
- Gulbarga – Bahamani Sultanate
- Bidar – Bahamani Sultanate
- Bijapur – Adil Shahi dynasty (Bijapur Sultanate)

=== Architectural styles ===
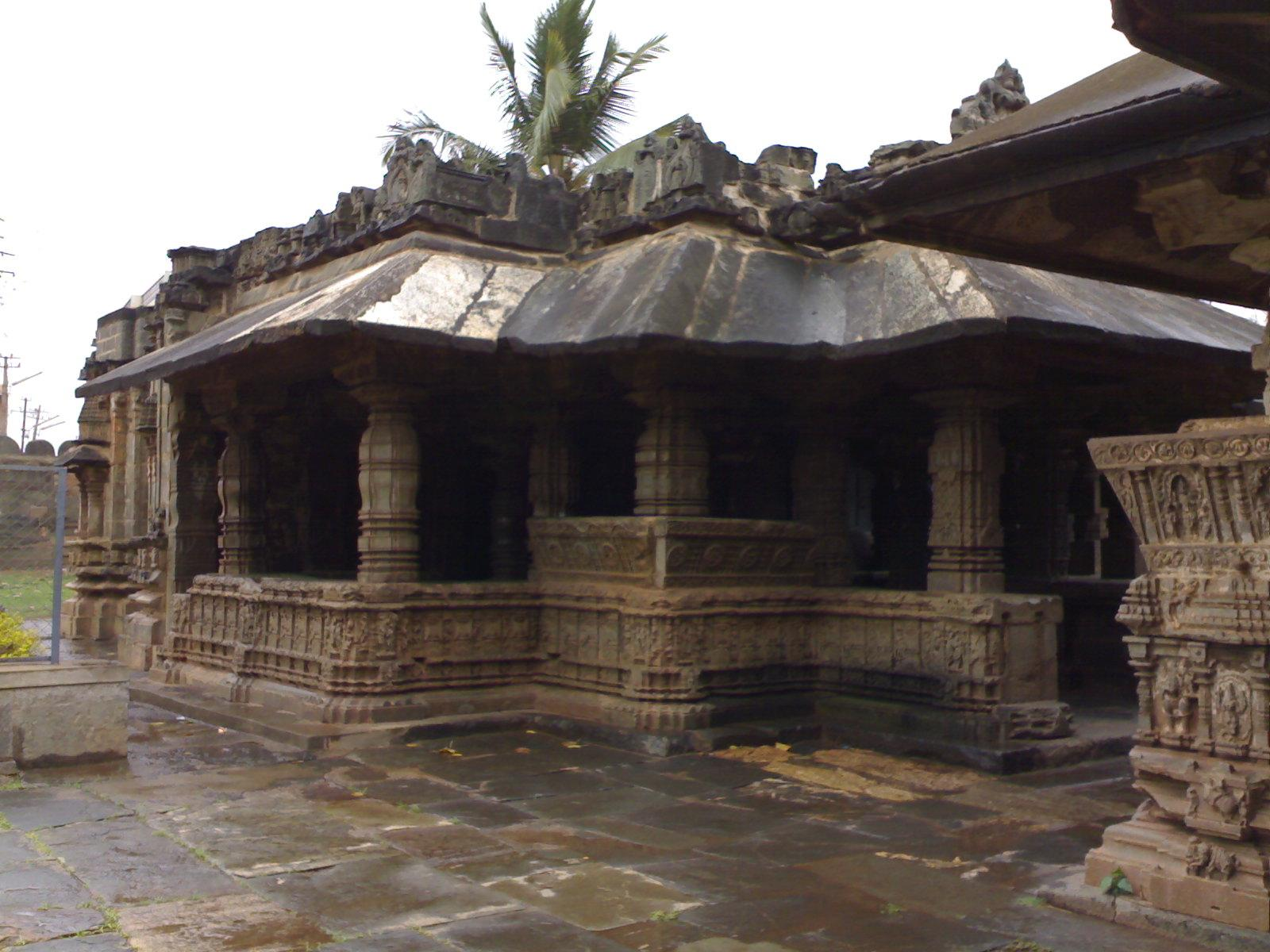
Trikuteshwara temple complex at Gadag-Betageri, North Karnataka

North Karnataka has contributed to various styles of Indian architecture during the rule of the Kadamba, Badami Chalukyas, Western Chalukya, Rashtrakuta and Vijayanagara empires:

- Vesara style
- Badami Chalukya architecture
- Gadag style of architecture
- Rashtrakutas style of architecture
- Vijayanagara architecture
- Kadamba architecture
- Bijapur style
- Keladi Nayaka style

=== History of Kannada language ===
Kannada is one of the oldest Dravidian languages, with an age of at least 2,000 years. The spoken language is said to have separated from its proto-Dravidian source later than Tamil. However, the archaeological evidence indicates a written tradition for this language of around 1,800–2,000 years. The initial development of Kannada is similar to that of other Dravidian languages and independent of Sanskrit. In later centuries, Kannada has been greatly influenced by Sanskrit in vocabulary, grammar and literary style.

As for the Dravidian race, the Monier-Williams Sanskrit Dictionary lists for the Sanskrit word draviḍa a meaning of a "collective name for Karnatakas, Gurjaras, Kannadigas and Mahārāstras". North Karnataka has its own dialect of Kannada.

- Old Kannada literature
- Kadamba script, Halegannada
- Chalukya Literature
- Kannada literature in the Western Chalukya Empire
- Rashtrakuta literature, Asaga, Amoghavarsha I, Kavirajamarga
- Extinct Kannada literature
- Kappe Arabhatta inscription at Badami
- Adikavi Pampa, Sri Ponna, Ranna
- Medieval Kannada literature
- Kannada literature in Vijayanagara empire
- Vachana sahitya, Basavanna, Akka Mahadevi
- Kumaravyasa, Karnata Bharata Kathamanjari (Mahabharata in Kannada)

=== Unification of Karnataka ===
- The role of North Karnataka in Unification of Karnataka
- Unification of Karnataka and Vidyavardhaka Sangha
- Unification of Karnataka and Aluru Venkata Rao
- The Belgaum Conference of 1924
- Liberation of Kalyana Karnataka (Hyderabad-Karnataka)

== Festivals ==
In Kannada utsava means "festival". The following are festivals celebrated in North Karnataka sponsored by Govt of Karnataka

- Gadag Utsava
- Chalukya Utsava
- Pattadakal Utsava
- Hampi Utsava
- Lakkundi Utsava
- Kittur Utsava
- Bidar Utsava
- Dharwad Utsava
- Sirsi Marikaba Utsav
- Kanakagiri Utsava
- Navaraspur Utsava at (Bijapur)
- Sawai Gandharva Festival at Kundgol
- Vishwa Kannada Sammelana held at Belgaum

== Tourism ==
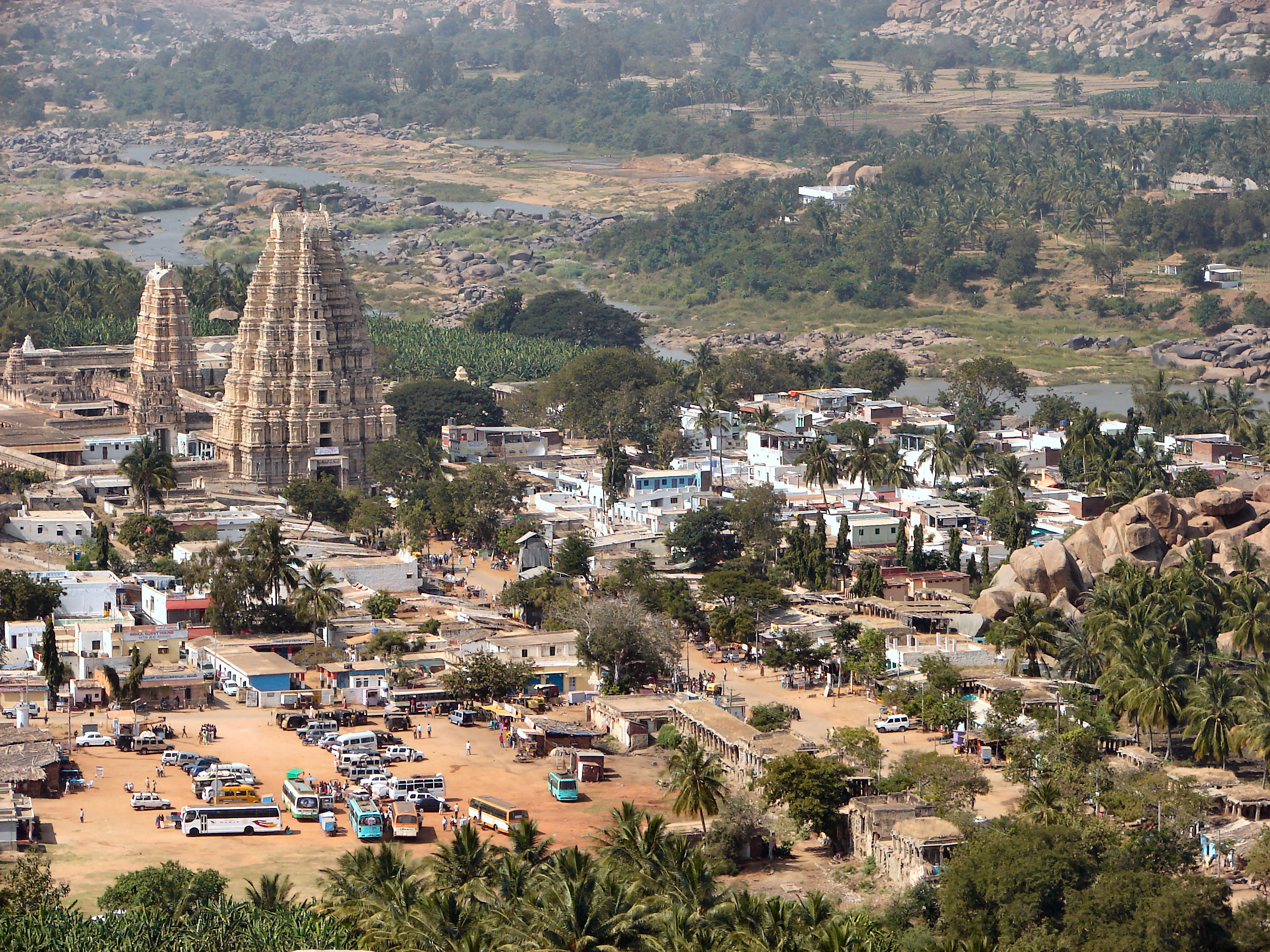
Hampi, in Bellary district

Temples of North Karnataka

The temples of North Karnataka may be categorised as historical or modern.

World Heritage Sites

- Hampi: Near Hospet in Bellary district
- Pattadakal: Near Badami in Bagalkot district
- world's 2nd Largest Dome Golagumatta Vijayapur
- Ibrahim Rosaa also called Black Tajamahal,VIJAYAPUR

National park and sanctuaries in North Karnataka

- Ranibennur Blackbuck Sanctuary
- Daroji Sloth Bear Sanctuary
- Bhimgad Wildlife Sanctuary
- Bonal Bird Sanctuary
- Ghataprabha Bird Sanctuary
- Attiveri Bird Sanctuary
- Magadi Bird Sanctuary
- Dandeli Wildlife Sanctuary
- Gudavi Bird Sanctuary
- Yedahalli Chinkara Wildlife Sanctuary, Mudhol- Bilagi

Utsav Rock Garden is a sculptural Garden located near NH-4 Pune-Bangalore road, Gotagodi Village, Shiggaon Taluk, Haveri District, Karnataka. Utsav Rock Garden is an sculptural garden representing contemporary art and rural culture. A typical village is created where men and women are involved in their daily household activities. A unique picnic spot which delights common people, educated and intellectuals. There are more than 1000 sculptures in the garden of different sizes. It is an anthropological museum. It represents traditional farming, crafts, folklore, cattle herding and sheep rearing.

== Universities and other educational institutions ==
- Indian Institute of Information Technology, Raichur
- Raichur University, Raichur
- University of Agricultural Sciences, Raichur
- Sri Taralabalu Jagadguru Institute of Technology, Ranebennur
- Karnataka State Rural Development and Panchayat Raj University, Gadag
- Indian Institute of Technology, Dharwad
- Indian Institute of Information Technology, Dharwad
- Karnataka University, Dharwad
- University of Agricultural Sciences, Dharwad
- S.D.M College of Engineering & Technology, Dharwad
- Karnatak Science College, Dharwad
- Karnataka State Law University, Hubli
- KLE Technological University, Hubli
- Karnataka Institute of Medical Sciences, Hubli
- Visvesvaraya Technological University, Belgaum
- Jawaharlal Nehru Medical College, Belgaum
- Central University of Karnataka, Gulbarga
- Kannada University, Hampi
- Gulbarga University, Gulbarga
- Karnataka State Women University, Bijapur
- Karnataka Veterinary, Animal and Fisheries Sciences University, Bidar
- Basaveshwar Engineering College, Bagalkot
- Vijayanagara Institute of Medical Sciences, Bellary
- Sainik School, Bijapur
- S Nijalingappa Medical College, HSK (Hanagal Shree Kumareshwar) Hospital and Research Centre, Bagalkot
- Karnataka Folklore University, Shiggaon

== Arts and crafts ==
- Kasuti embroidery: putting stitches by hand on dresswear like Ilkal sarees. Lambanis of Bellary district have their own embroidery style.
- Bidriware: metal handicraft originated in Bidar during the rule of the Bahamani Sultans
- Kinhal Crafts: originated in Kinhal (Kinnal) in Koppal district. Crafts are mainly toys, wood carvings and mural paintings.
- Gokak toys: originated in Gokak in Belgaum district.

== Natural resources ==
The Hutti Gold Mine is the only gold-extraction company in India. It operates in Hatti, an ancient gold- mining area about 70 km from Raichur. Tourism is also permitted inside the mine. The Gadag, Koppal and Bellary districts are rich in manganese, gold and iron ore. Kalaburagi district is rich in lime

== Religion ==
=== Hinduism ===
==== Lingayatism ====
The followers of Basavanna and Panchacharyas who worship god through "istalinga". Lingayatism is a sect of Hinduism and worship Shiva in the form of Linga.

==== Brahmins ====
Varna (class) in Hinduism specialising as priests, teachers (Acharyaru) and protectors of sacred learning across generations are known as Brahmanaru.

=== Buddhism ===
Buddhism in North Karnataka dates from the third to the first centuries BC. Sannati and Kanaganahalli are two important excavation sites, and there is a Tibetan Buddhist colony at Mundgod.

=== Banjara ===
Banjara's are the followers of Shaktism and Sevalal

Languages of North Karnataka in 2011.
1. Kannada (74.3%)
2. Urdu (12.9%)
3. Telugu (3.04%)
4. Marathi (3.66%)
5. Lambadi (3.05%)
6. Hindi (1.00%)
7. Other (2.08%)

== See also ==
- Temples of North Karnataka
- List of North Karnataka historical sites
- Chalukya
- Western Chalukya architecture
- Western Chalukya
- Vijayanagara architecture
- Dravidian architecture
- Badami Chalukya architecture
- Tourism in North Karnataka
- Bayaluseemae
- Siddis of Karnataka
- Family names in North Karnataka
- Timeline of Maharashtra history
- Deccan States Agency
- Shilahara used Kannada as official language
- South Western Railway zone
