= Gurgunta =

Guragunta Gudagunti
- Village
- Location within Karnataka Location within India
- Coordinates: 16°15′21″N 76°33′46″E
- Country: India
- State: Karnataka
- District: Raichur district
- Taluk: Lingasugur

Population (2011)
  - Total: 14,375

Languages
  - Official: Kannada
- Time zone: UTC+5:30 (IST)
- PIN: 584139
- Telephone code: 08537
- Vehicle registration: KA-36

Gurgunta, also spelled as Guragunta, is a village in the northern state of Karnataka, India. Gurgunta is located to the south of Krishna River, at an elevation of 464 metres above the sea level.

== Demographics ==
As of 2001 India census, Gurgunta had a population of 10207 with 5207 males and 5000 females. Gurgunta is situated on sh 19.

== See also ==
- Maski
- Hatti
- Mudgal
- Raichur
- Districts of Karnataka
