= Nuggikeri Hanuman Temple =

Hindu temple in Dharwad

- ನುಗ್ಗಿಕೇರಿ ಶ್ರೀ ಹನುಮಾನ್ ದೇವಸ್ಥಾನ
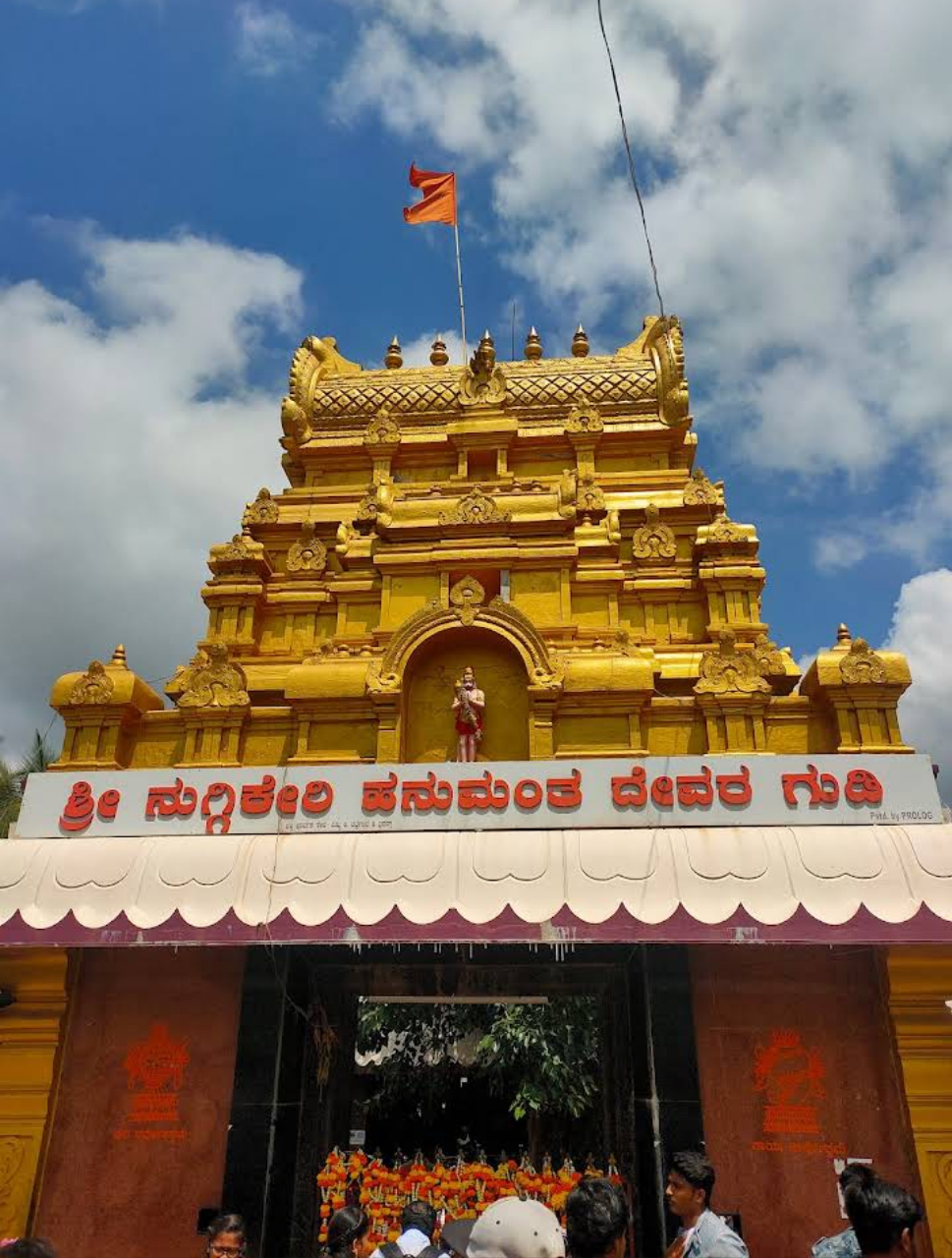
- Temple entrance

- Location in Karnataka

Religion
- Affiliation: Hinduism
- District: Dharwad District
- Deity: Hanuman
- Festival: Hanuman Jayanti

Location
- Location: Dharwad
- State: Karnataka
- Country: India
- Interactive map of Nuggikeri Hanuman Temple
- Coordinates: 15.4130738°N 75.0054250°E

Nuggikeri Hanuman Temple (Kannada: ನುಗ್ಗಿಕೇರಿ ಶ್ರೀ ಹನುಮಾನ್ ದೇವಸ್ಥಾನ) is one of the oldest and popular Hindu temples in Dharwad, in the state of Karnataka, India. The presiding deity of the temple is Lord Hanuman and the temple complex also houses other deities viz. Lord Rama, Lord Shiva, Goddess Saraswathi, Goddess Durga, Goddess Santoshimata, Lord Venugopala Swamy, and Lord Jagannath. The temple is located at the airport road and 18 km away from central Hubli, Dharwad, Karnataka, India. Devotees come from different regions to this temple. Due to Vishesha Divasa for Lord Hanuman this place gets crowded every Saturday and on Hanuman Jayanti.

== History ==
The pratishtapana of the Lord Balabheema was done by Sri Vyasatirtha (the chief saint in the court of Sri Krishnadevaraya of Hampi ). The deity is idolized by devotees in Dharwad and the surrounding districts of Karnataka and Maharashtra. The temple management was handed over to the Nuggikeri Desai family, a Deshastha Brahmin family which traces its origins to Indapur in Pune district, by the second Konkanastha Peshwa during the 18th century Maratha Empire. The founder of the Nuggikeri Desai family, Nilerao from Indapur, was in the service of the Maratha Army and had participated in the Battle of Palkhed and other important battles. Due to his services, he was awarded the Jagir of Nuggikeri and fourteen other villages in Dharwad. Since then, a senior member of the Nuggikeri Desai family has taken care of the temple management.

== Present day scenario ==
Till date, the Lord Hanuman temple is being managed by the same Desai family. The three sub-families of Nuggikeri Desai family follow a system of paryaya (internal rotation system) in the management of the temple with the management changing once every year

Every year on the auspicious day of Chaitra Suddha Poornima i.e., Hanuman Jayanti, the management organizes a Ratha Mahotsav. Every Saturday thousands of devotees visit the temple and offer prayers to Lord Hanuman
