= Timeline of Maharashtra history =

- 600 BC: One of the 16 great janapadas, named Ashmaka
- 230 BC to 225 AD: ruled by the Satavahanas
- 250 to 525: The Vakatakas brought the Vidharba under their rule.
- 550 to 760: Ruled by the Chalukyas (Badami Chalukyas)
- 640: Chinese pilgrim Xuanzang visited Maharashtra
- 973: Rashtrakutas rule comes to an end
- 973 to 1180: Ruled by the Chalukyas (Western Chalukyas or Kalyani Chalukyas)
- 1189 to 1310: Ruled by the Yadavas of Deogiri (Seunas)
- 1296: Alla-ud-din Khilji, the first Muslim sultan of the north, penetrated the Deccan, defeated the Yadavas, and carried away a huge hoard of loot.
- 1534: Portuguese occupied Mumbai.
- 1659: Shivaji captured Satara from Bijapur Sultanate, and led a revolt against the Mughal Empire
- 1661: Mumbai transferred from Portugal to Britain
- 1668: British government transferred Mumbai to the British East India Company
- 1674: Chatrapati Shivaji became the first King of the Marathas
- 1680: Death of Chatrapati Shivaji
- 1689: Death of Sambhaji
- 1707: Shahu I became Chhatrapati of the Maratha Empire
- 1720: Bajirao I became peshwa (prime minister)
- 1740: Death of Bajirao I
- 1756: Marathas captured the town of Attock (now in north-west Pakistan). Maratha Empire reached its largest extent.
- 14 January 1761: Marathas lost the Third Battle of Panipat.
- 1775–1782: First Anglo-Maratha War
- 1803–1805: Second Anglo-Maratha War
- 1817–1818: Third Anglo-Maratha War
- 3 June 1818: Bajirao II surrendered to the British
- 15 August 1947: Independence of India
- 1 November 1956: Bombay state enlarged to include all of present Maharashtra.
- 1 May 1960: Bombay state split along linguistic lines into new states of Gujarat and Maharashtra.
