= Vijayanagara architecture =

Architecture of the Vijayanagara Empire, 1336–1565

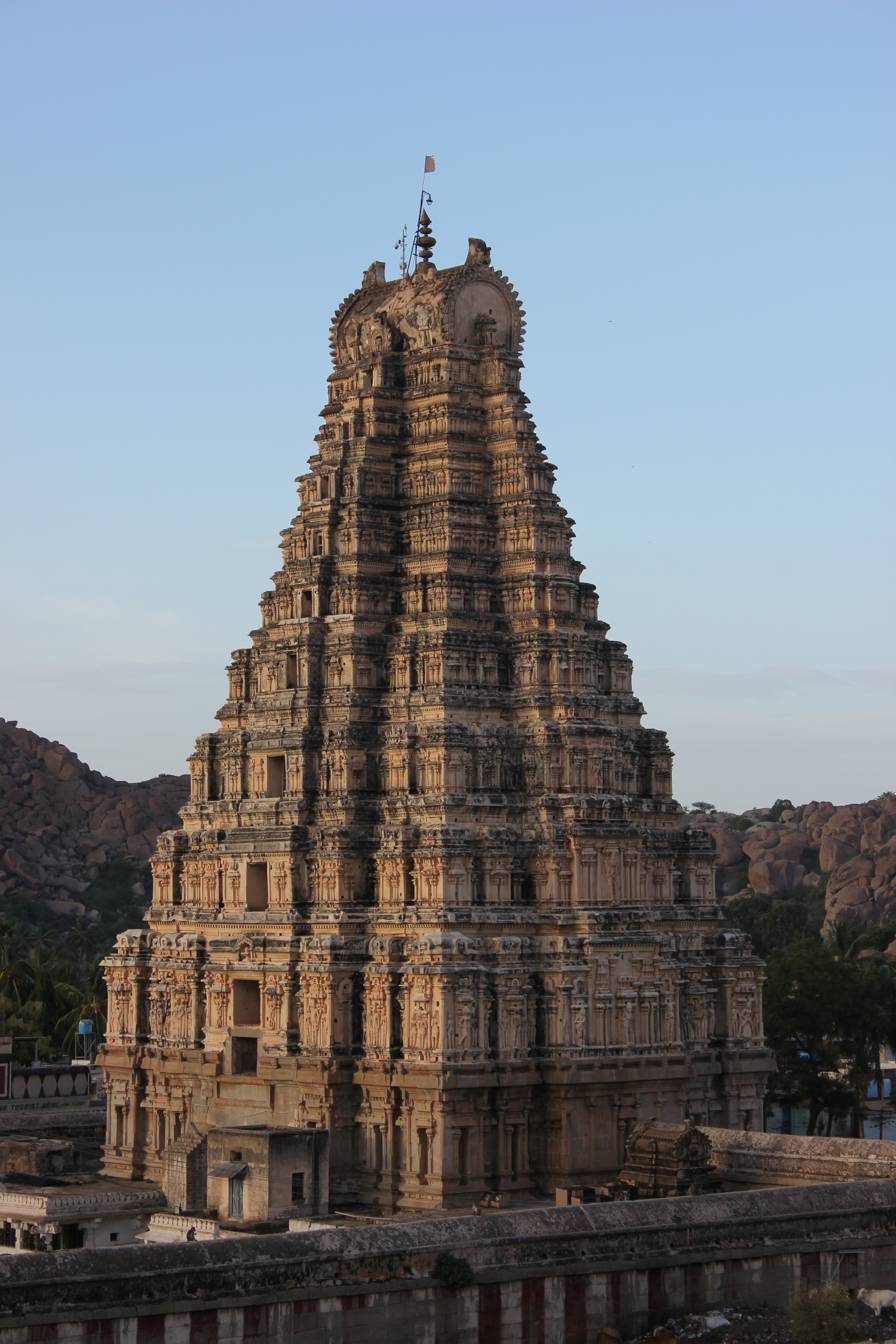
Virupaksha temple, Raja Gopura (main tower over entrance gate) at Hampi, Karnataka

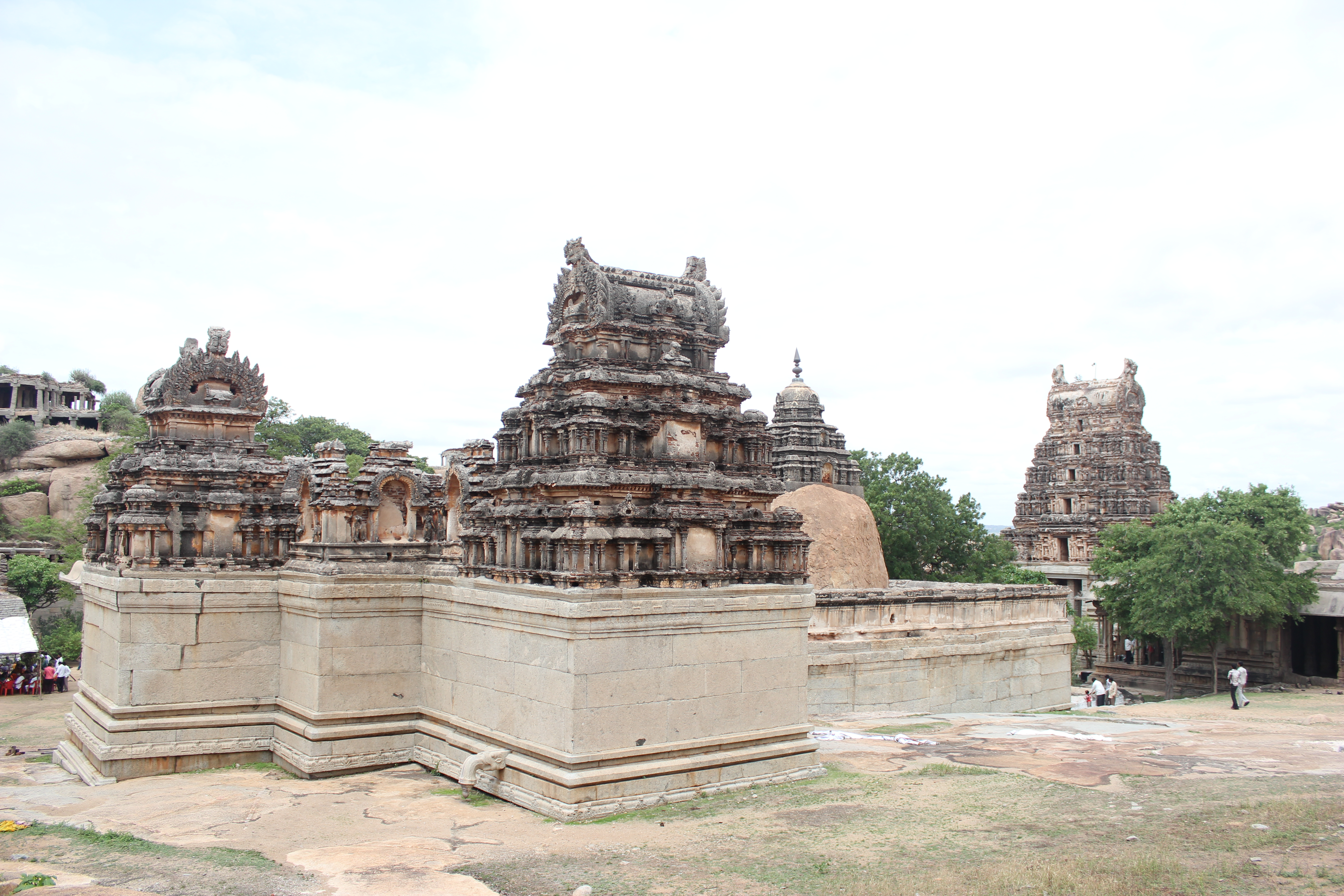
Typical dravidian style Shikhara (superstructure) over shrines at the Raghunatha temple in Hampi

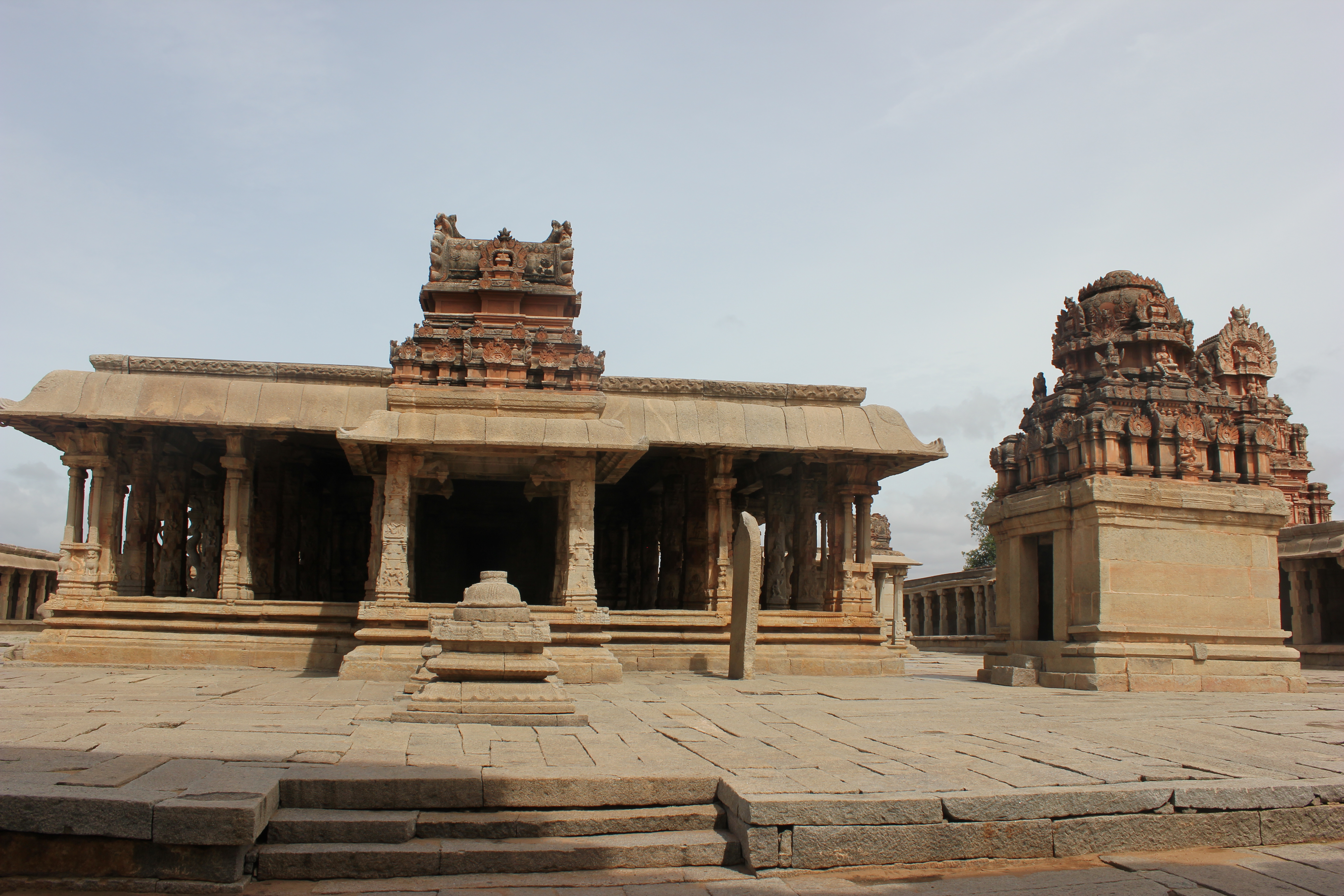
Typical dravidian shrine and mantapa of the Vijayanagara period at Balakrishna temple in Hampi

Vijayanagara architecture of 1336–1565 CE was a notable building idiom that developed during the rule of the imperial Hindu Vijayanagara Empire. The empire ruled South India, from their regal capital at Vijayanagara, on the banks of the Tungabhadra River in modern Karnataka, India. The empire built temples, monuments, palaces and other structures across South India, with the largest concentration in its capital. The monuments in and around Hampi, in the Vijayanagara district, are listed as a UNESCO World Heritage Site.

In addition to building new temples, the empire added new structures and made modifications to hundreds of temples across South India. Some structures at Vijayanagara are from the pre-Vijayanagara period. The Mahakuta hill temples are from the Western Chalukya era. The region around Hampi had been a popular place of worship for centuries before the Vijayanagara period with the earliest records dating from 689 CE when it was known as Pampa Tirtha after the local river God Pampe.

There are hundreds of monuments in the core area of the capital city. Of these, 56 are protected by UNESCO, 654 monuments are protected by the Government of Karnataka and another 300 await protection.

== Salient features ==
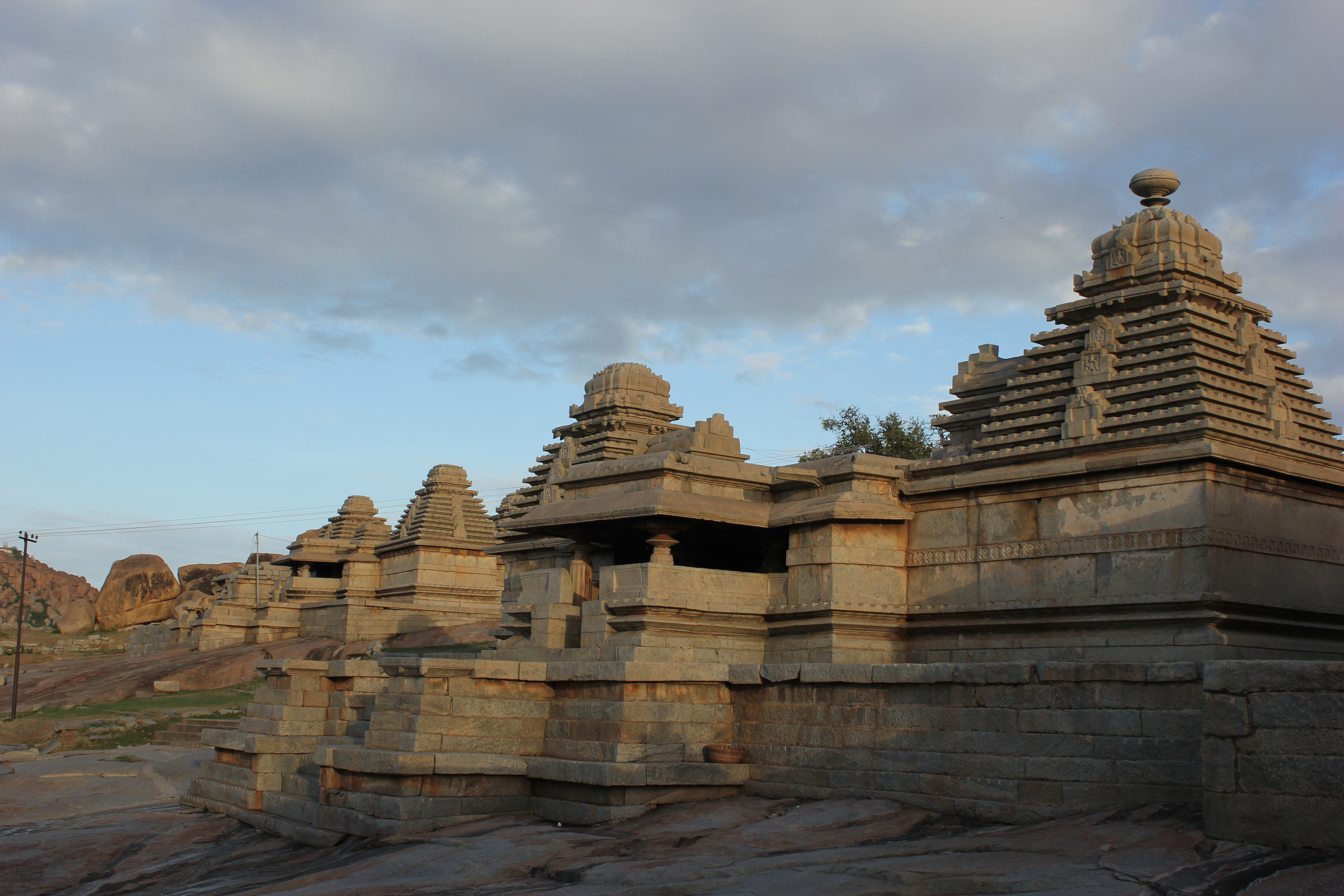
Early 14th century Shiva temples on Hemakuta hill built during the rule of Harihara Raya I incorporates the stepped Kadamba style nagara shikhara (superstructure)

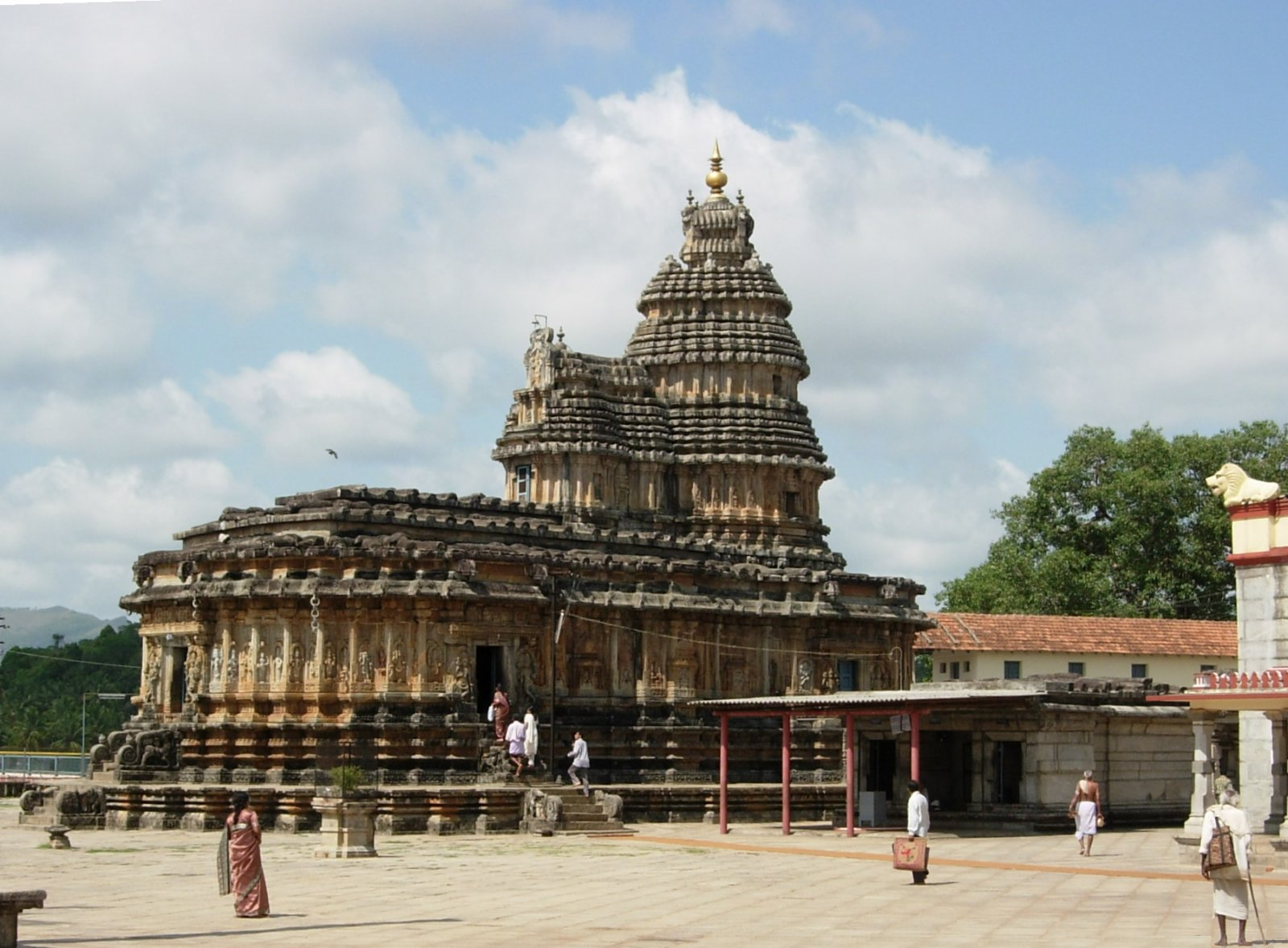
The mid-14th century Vidyashankara temple at Sringeri, one of the earliest temples built by the kings of the empire

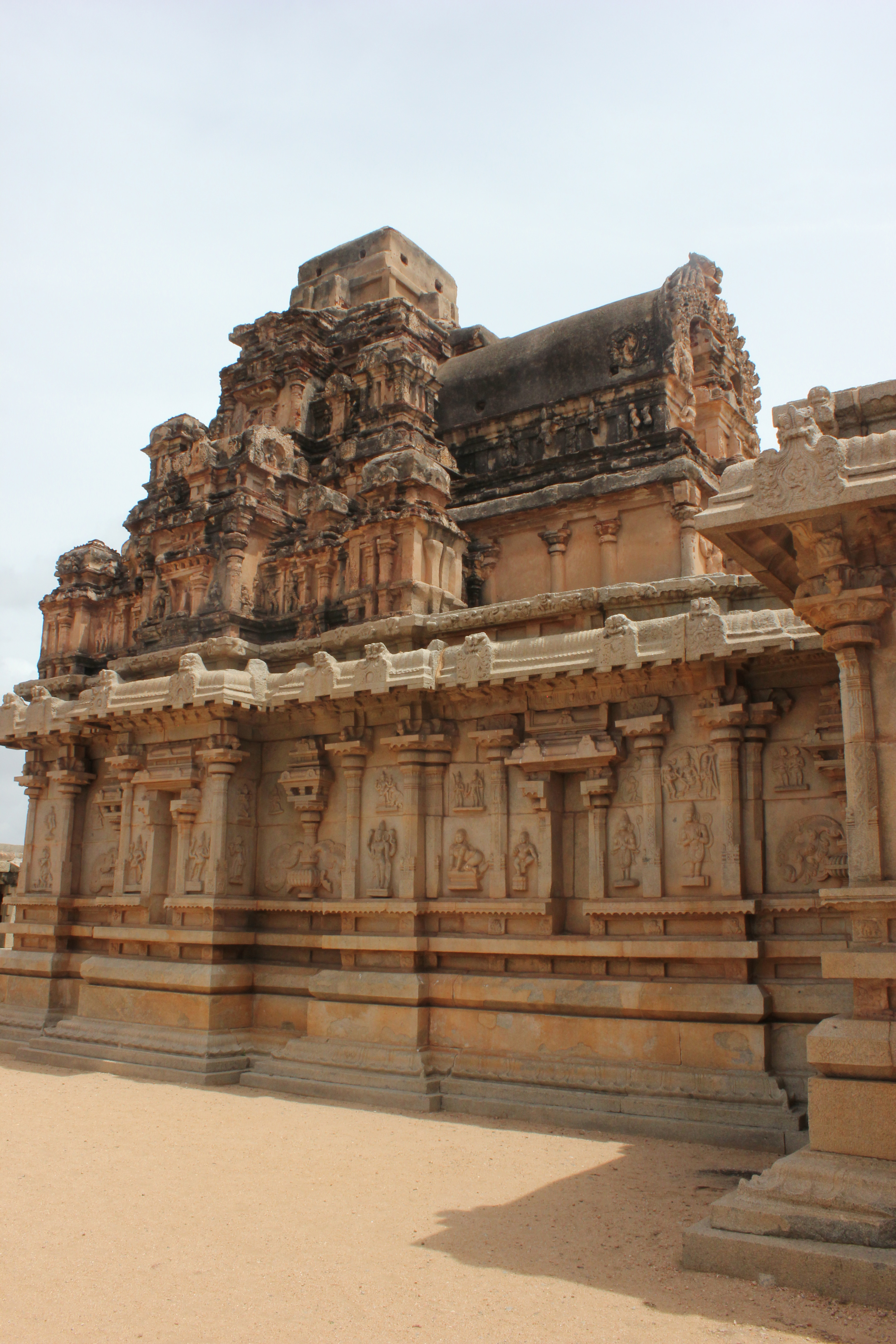
Typical shrine at Hazare Rama temple in Hampi

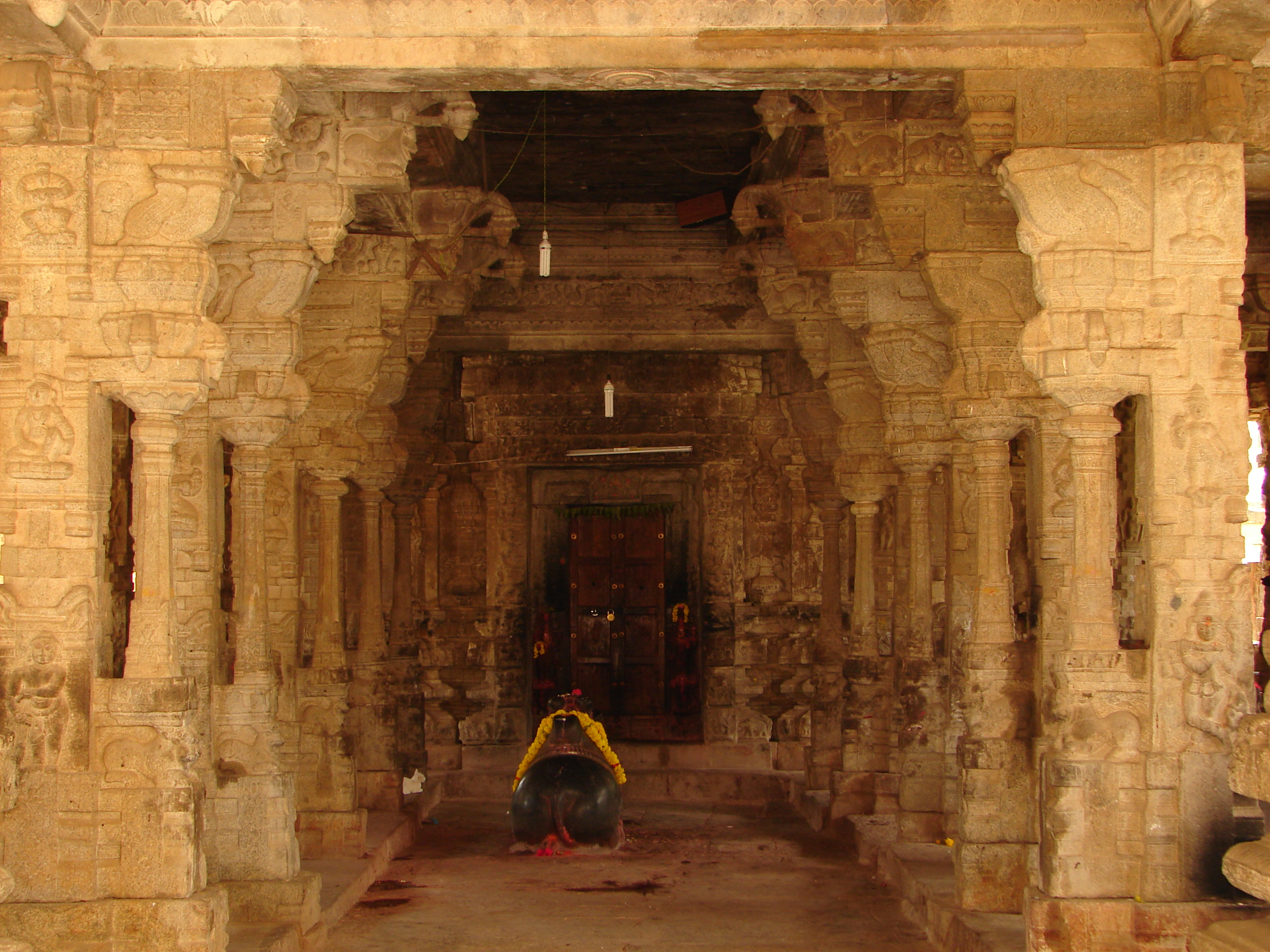
A typical Vijayanagara style pillared maha mantapa (main hall) at Someshvara temple at Kolar

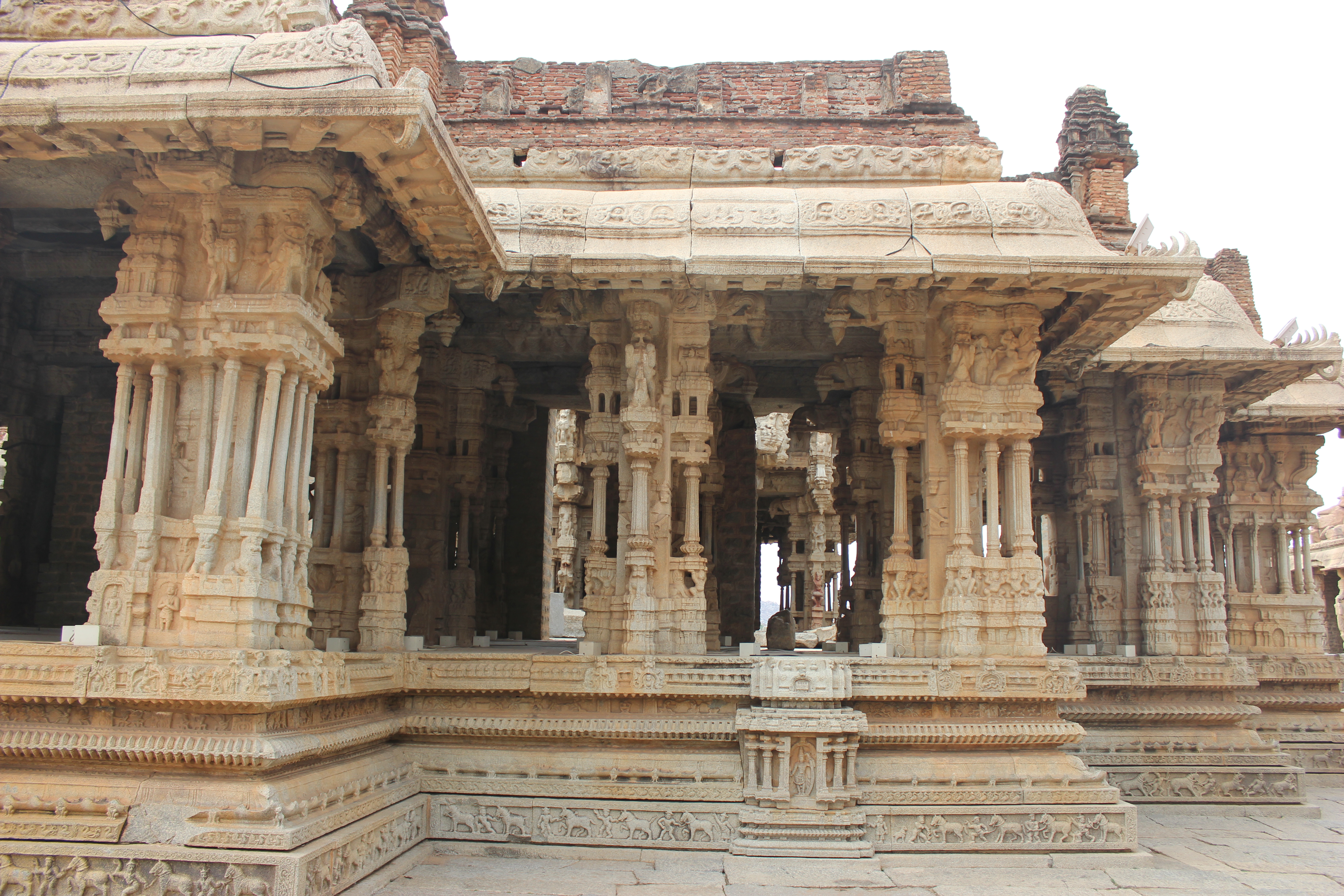
Pillared open mantapa incorporating Hoysala style "staggered square" layout at Vittala temple in Hampi

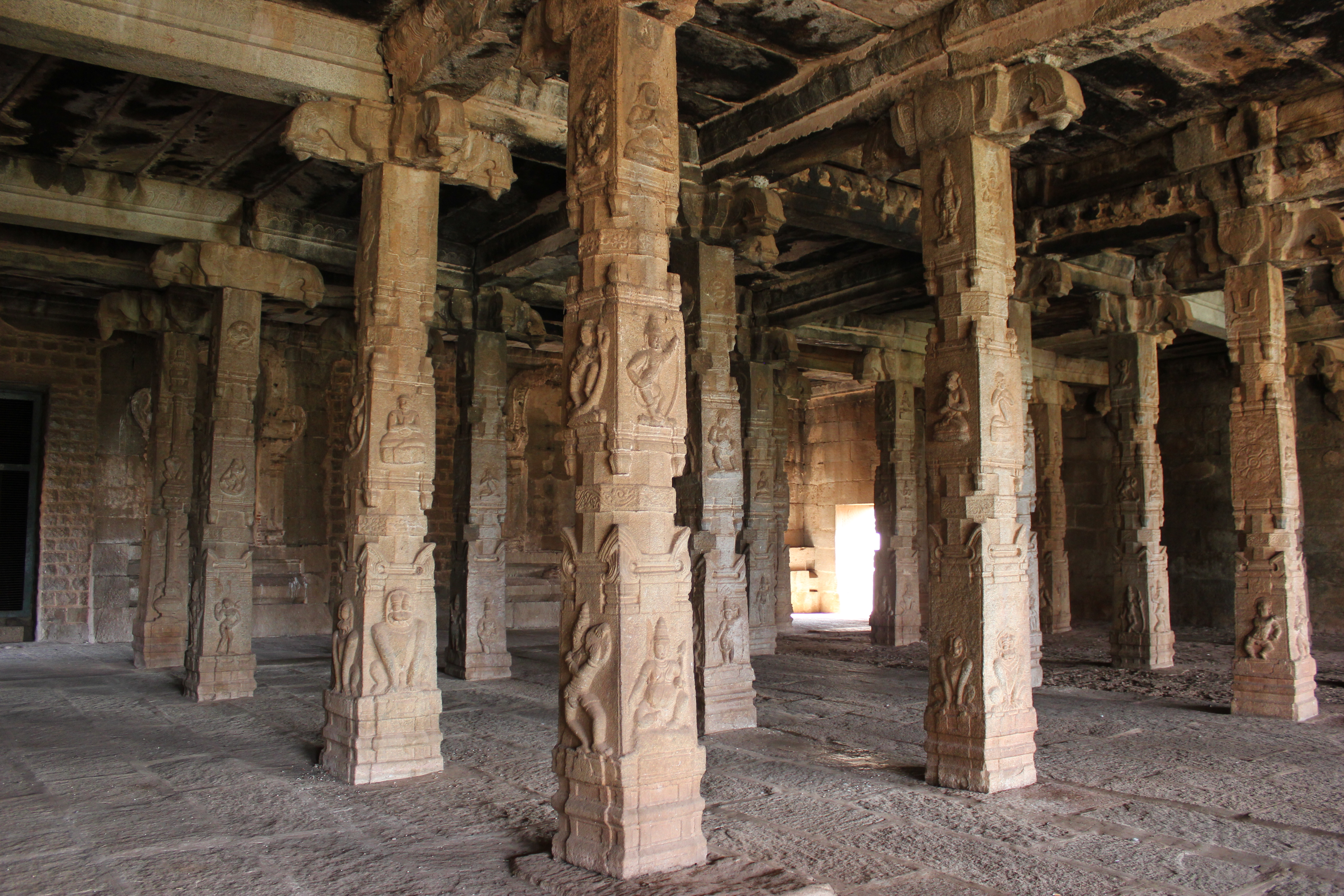
Typical large open pillared hall at Ananthasayana temple in Ananthasayanagudi, Bellary district, Karnataka

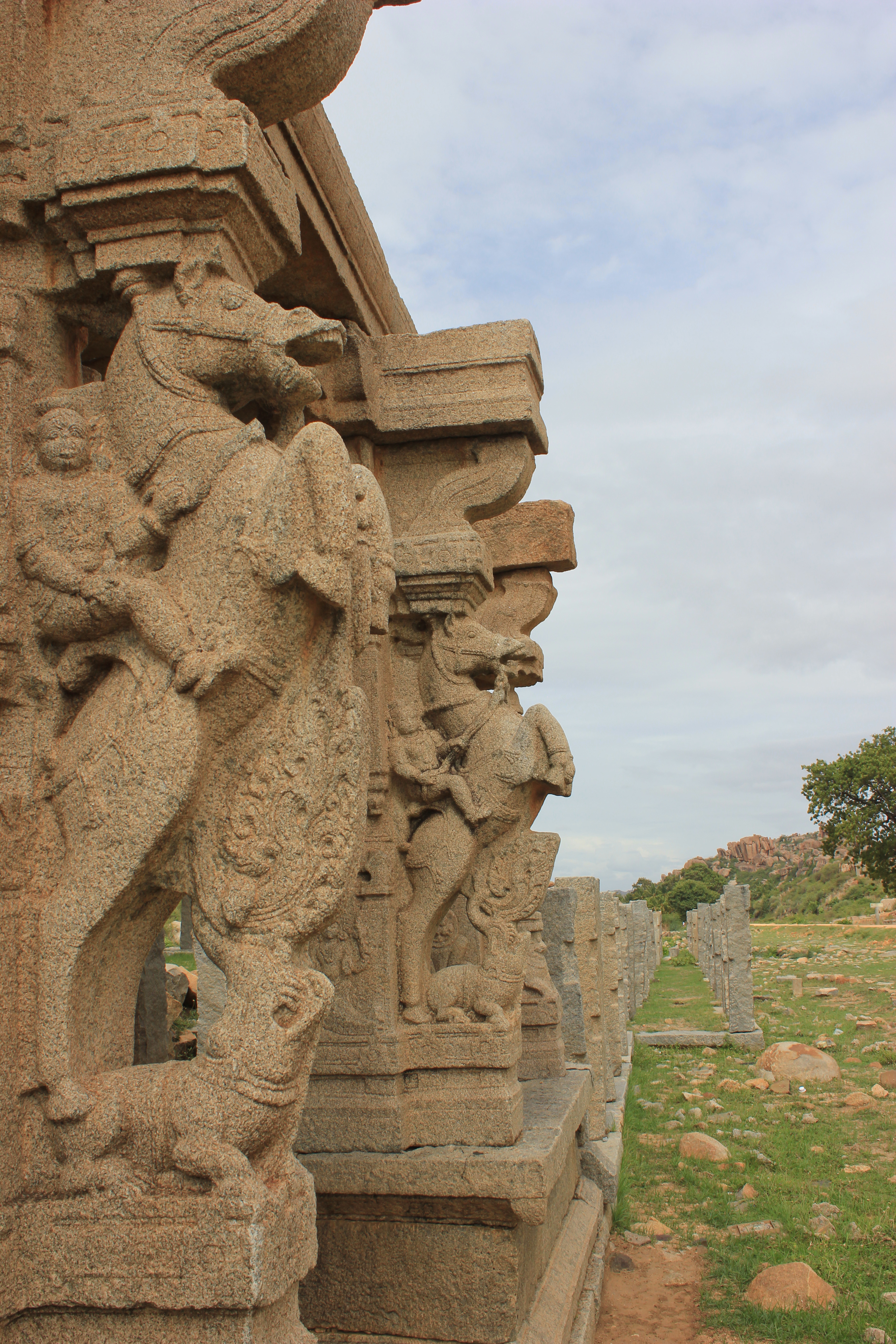
Kudure gombe (horse doll) pillars in a mantapa at Hampi

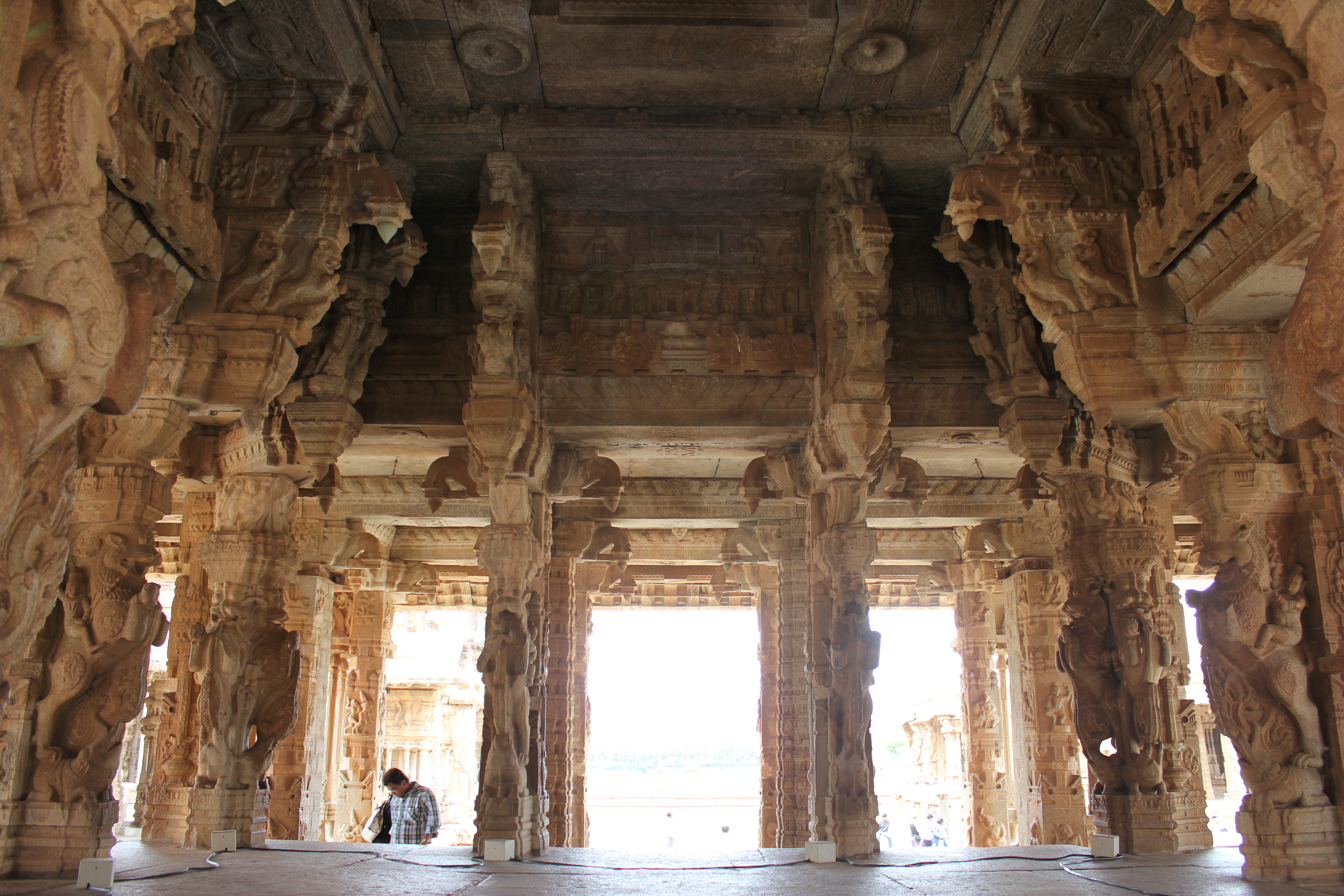
An open mantapa with yali columns at the Vittala temple in Hampi

Vijayanagara architecture can be broadly classified into religious, courtly and civic architecture, as can the associated sculptures and paintings. The Vijayanagara style is a combination of the Chalukya, Hoysala, Rashtrakuta, Pandya and Chola styles which evolved earlier in the centuries when these empires ruled and is characterised by a return to the simplistic and serene art of the past. Large multi-purpose halls (mandapas) surrounding the main shrine with elaborate and intricately carved pillars and the tall entrance towers (Gopurams, more specifically Rayagopurams named after the ruling Rayas) are two notable Vijayanagara additions to South Indian temple architectural tradition.

For the approximately 400 years during the rule of the Western Chalukya and the Hoysalas empires, the most popular material for temple construction was chloritic schist or soapstone. This was also true for sculpture as soapstone is soft and easily carved. During the Vijayanagar period the local hard granite was preferred in the Badami Chalukya style, although soapstone was used for a few reliefs and sculptures. While the use of granite reduced the density of sculptured works, granite was a more durable material for the temple structure. Because granite is prone to flaking, few pieces of individual sculptures reached the high levels of quality seen in previous centuries. To cover the unevenness of the stone used in sculptures, artists employed plaster to give the rough surface a smooth finish and then painted it with lively colours.

== Temples ==
Vijayanagara temples are usually surrounded by a strong enclosure. Small shrines consist simply of a garbhagriha (sanctum) and a porch. Medium-sized temples have a garbhagriha, shukanasi (antechamber), a navaranga (antrala) connecting the sanctum and outer mandapa or mantapa (hall), and a rangamantapa (enclosed pillared hall). Large temples have tall Rayagopuram built with wood, brick and stucco in Chola style. The term Raya is added to indicate a gopura built by Vijayanagar Rayas. The top of the gopuram has a shalashikhara resembling a barrel made to rest on its side. Large life-size figures of men, woman, Gods and Goddesses adorn the gopuram. This Tamil dravida-influenced style became popular during the rule of king Krishnadevaraya and is seen in South Indian temples constructed over the next 200 years. Examples of Rayagopuram are the Chennakesava Temple in Belur and the temples at Srisailam and Srirangam. In addition to these structures, medium-size temples have a closed circumambulatory (Pradakshinapatha) passage around the sanctum, an open mahamantapa (large hall), a kalyanamantapa (ceremonial hall) and a temple tank to serve the needs of annual celebrations.

Temple pillars often have engravings of charging horses or hippogryphs (Yali) — horses standing on hind legs with their forelegs lifted and riders on their backs. The horses on some pillars stand seven to eight feet tall. On the other side of the pillar are usually carvings from Hindu mythology. Pillars that do not have such hippogryphs are generally rectangular with mythology-themed decoration on all sides. Some pillars have a cluster of smaller pillars around a central pillar shaft. The bottom supports of these pillars have engravings of gods and goddesses. Carvings of hippogryphs clearly show the adroitness of the artists who created them.

The Mandapas are built on square or polygonal plinths with carved friezes that are four to five feet high and have ornate stepped entrances on all four sides with miniature elephants or with Yali balustrades (parapets). The Mantapas are supported by ornate pillars. The 1,000-pillared style with large halls supported by numerous pillars was popular. The 1,000-pillared Jain basadi at Mudabidri is an example. Larger temples have a separate shrine for the female deity. Some examples of this are the Hazara Rama, Balakrishna and Vitthala temples at Hampi.

Some shrines in the Vitthalapura area inside Vijayanagara were consecrated specifically for Tamil Alwar saints and for the great Vaishnava saint, Ramanujacharya. Architecturally they are different in that each shrine has an image depicting the saint for whose worship the temple was built. Each shrine has its own enclosure and a separate kitchen and pilgrim-feeding hall. The water storage tank inside the royal center, the [stepwell stepped tank] called "Pushkarni", is a recent archaeological discovery. The stepped tank is fashioned with finished chlorite schist slabs arranged in a symmetrical formation with steps and landings descending to the water on all four sides. This is clearly a Western Chalukya-Hoysala style tank and is seen in many parts of present-day Karnataka.

== Palaces ==
Much of what is known today of Vijayanagara palaces is drawn from archaeological excavations at Hampi as no royal palace structures have survived. Most palaces stand in their own compound defined by high tapering walls made of stone or layered earth. Palaces are approached through a sequence of courts with passageways and doorways requiring multiple changes in direction. All palaces face east or north. The larger palaces have side extensions giving the complex a symmetrical shape.

Palaces were built on raised platforms made of granite. The platforms have multiple tiers of mouldings with well-decorated friezes. The decorations can be floral, Kirtimukha shapes (demon faces), geese, elephants and occasionally human figures. Pillars, beams and rafters inside the palace were made of wood as evidenced by ash discovered in excavations. The roof was made of brick or lime concrete, while copper and ivory were used for finials. Palaces commonly consisted of multiple levels with each flight of stairs decorated by balustrades on either side, with either yali (imaginary beast) or elephant sculptures. The entrance steps into palaces and temple mantapas were similarly decorated. Water tanks inside the palace complex have decorative water spouts such as the carved torso of the Nandi with a gaping mouth to allow water flow into the tank. Other structures commonly found inside a palace complex are wells and shrines.

The courtly architecture generally show secular styles with Islamic influences. Examples are the Lotus Mahal palace, Elephant stables, and watch towers. Courtly buildings and domed structures were built with mortar mixed with stone rubble.

== Gallery ==
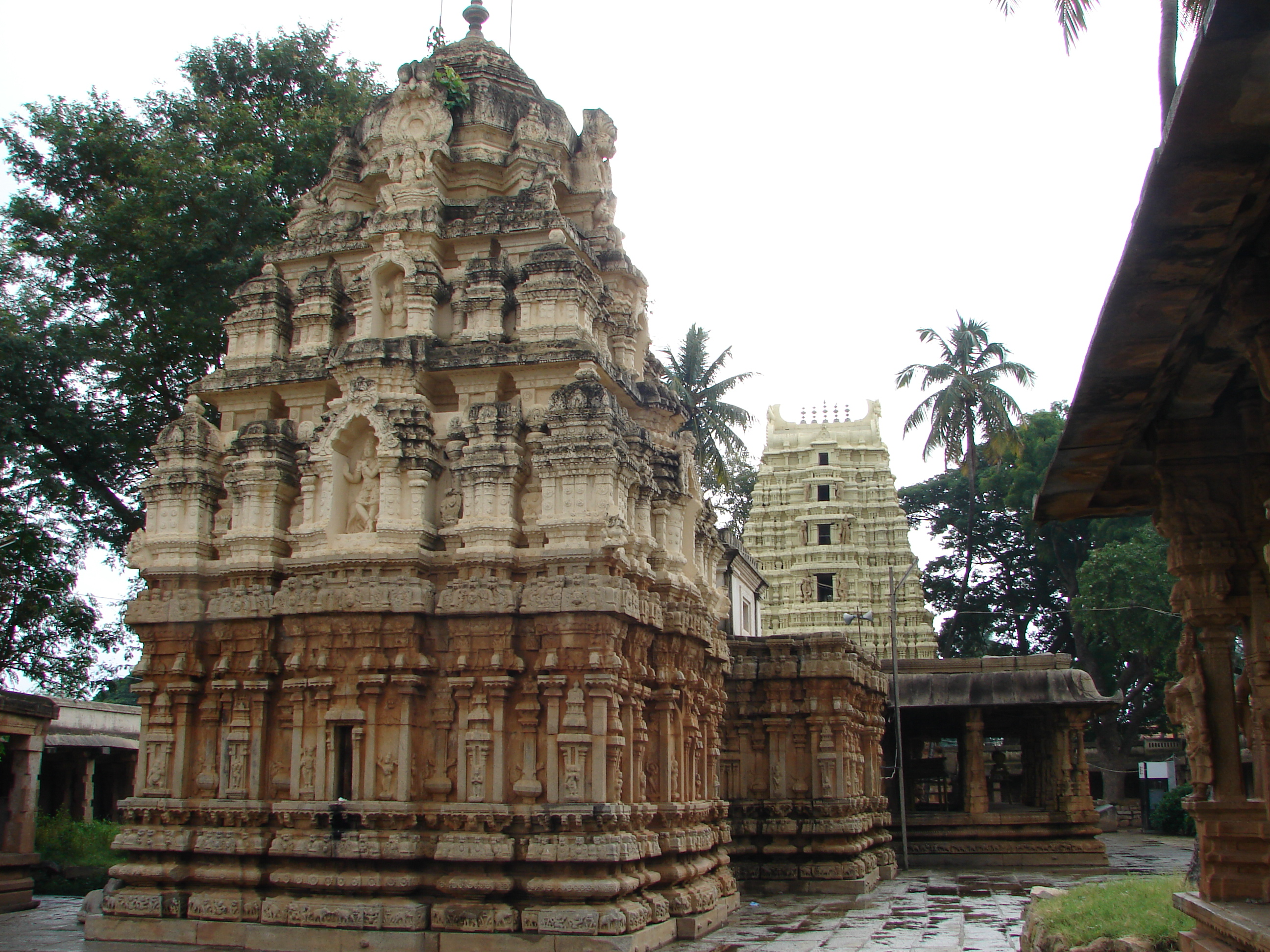
Typical Vijayanagara style dravida shikhara (south Indian style tower over shrine) at the Someshvara temple at Kolar (14th century)

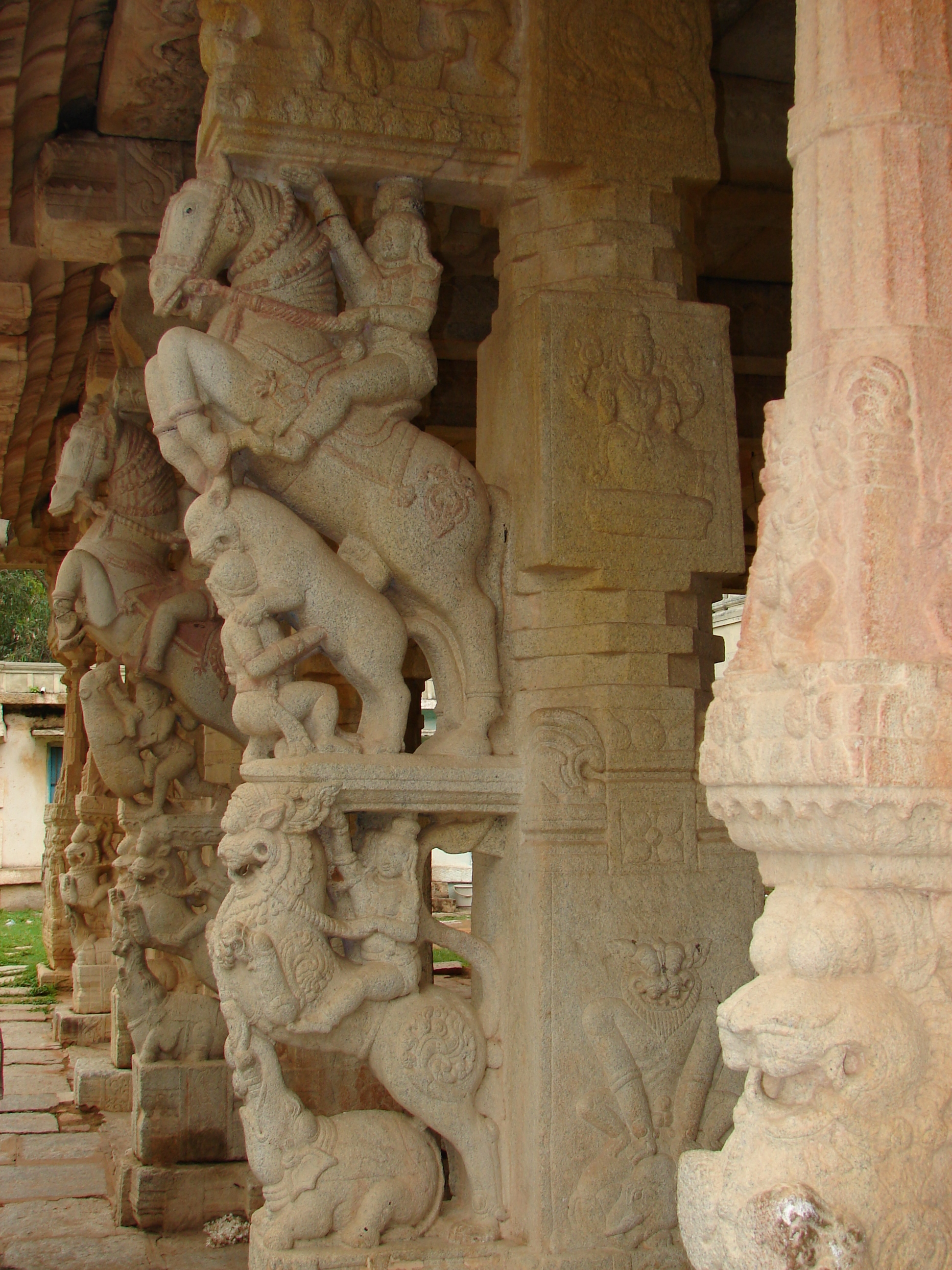
Yali pillars at Ranganatha temple, Rangasthala, Chikkaballapur district, Karnataka

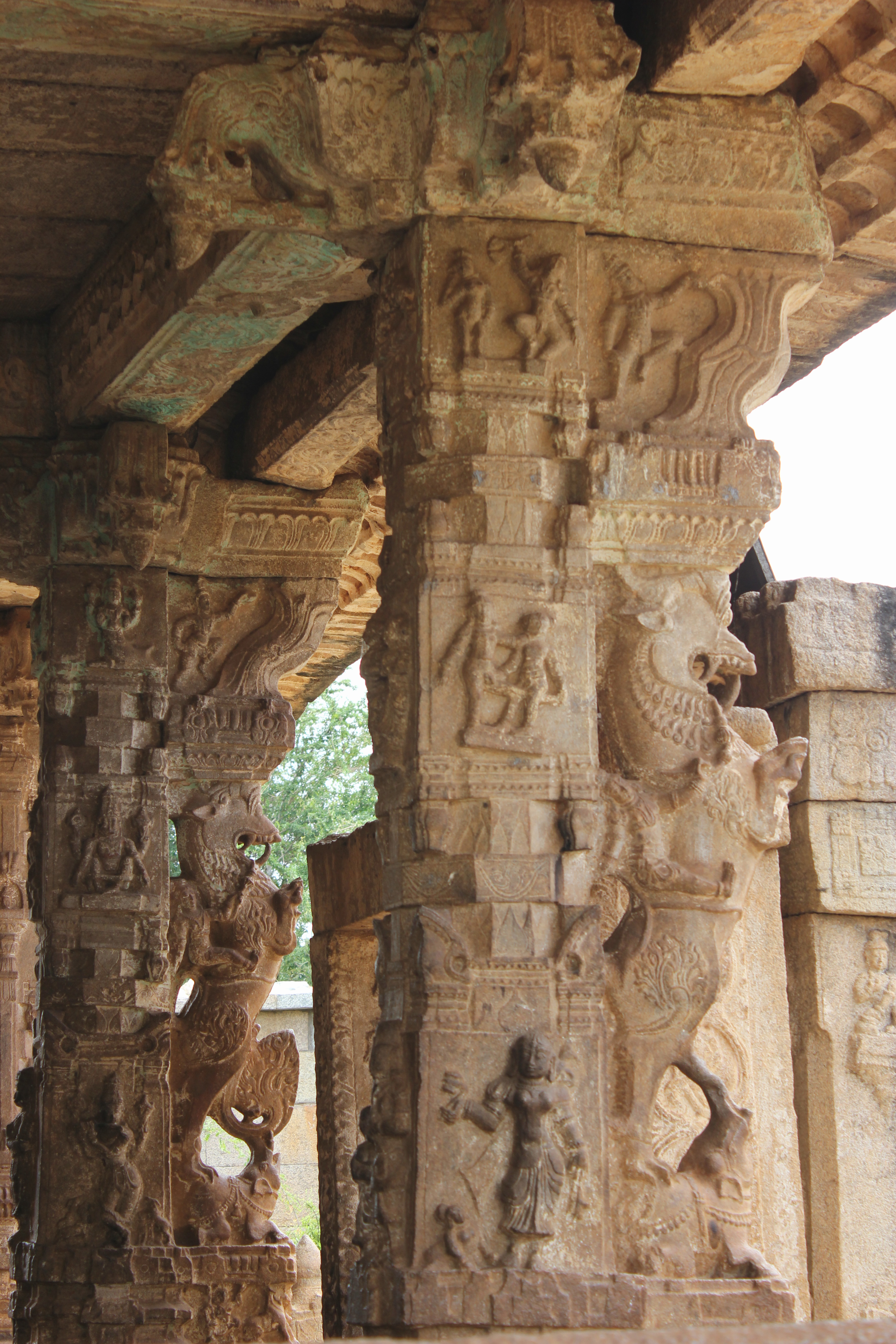
Yali pillars at Ranganatha temple in Neerthadi, Chitradurga district, Karnataka

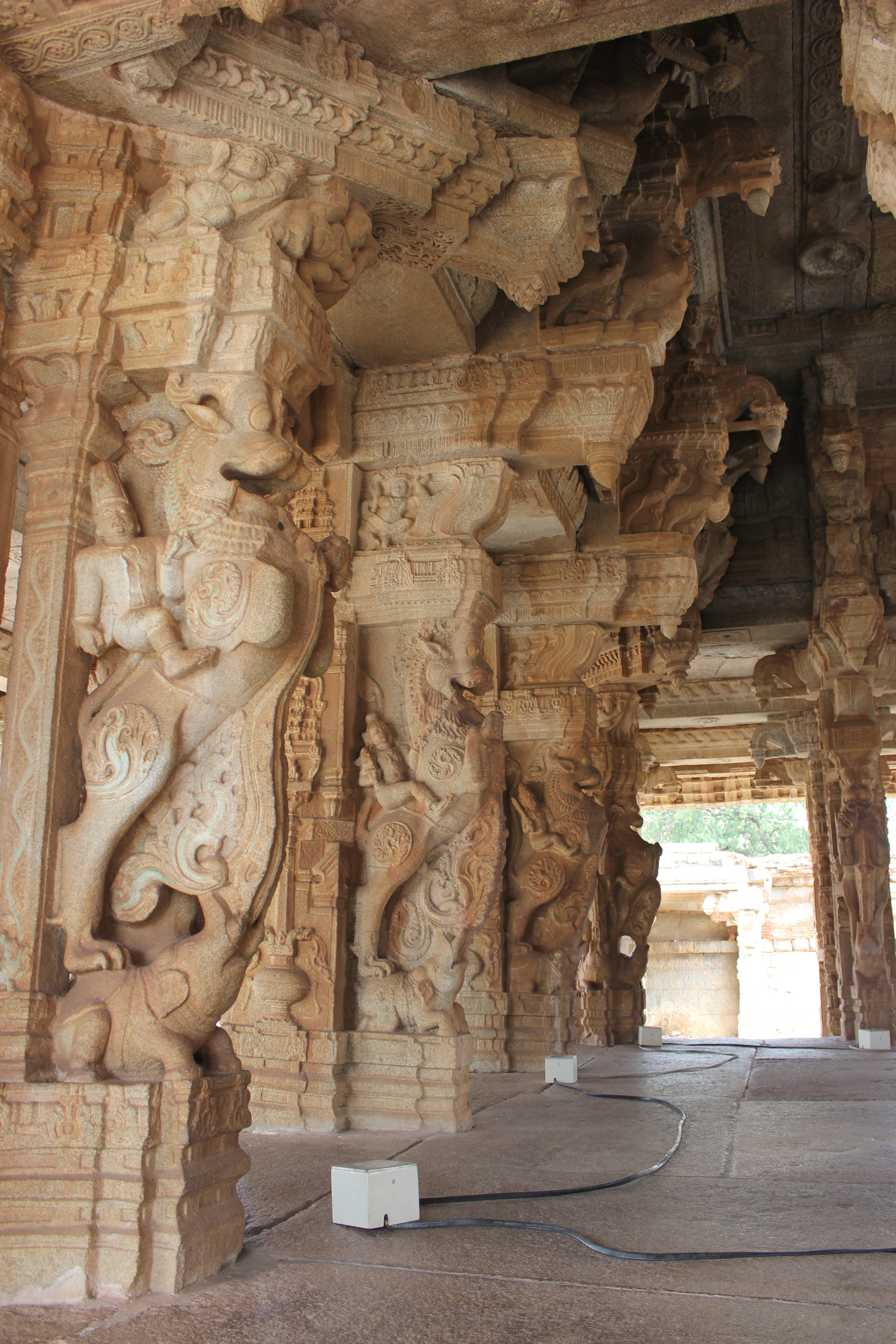
Yali pillars of a mantapa at Vittala temple, Hampi

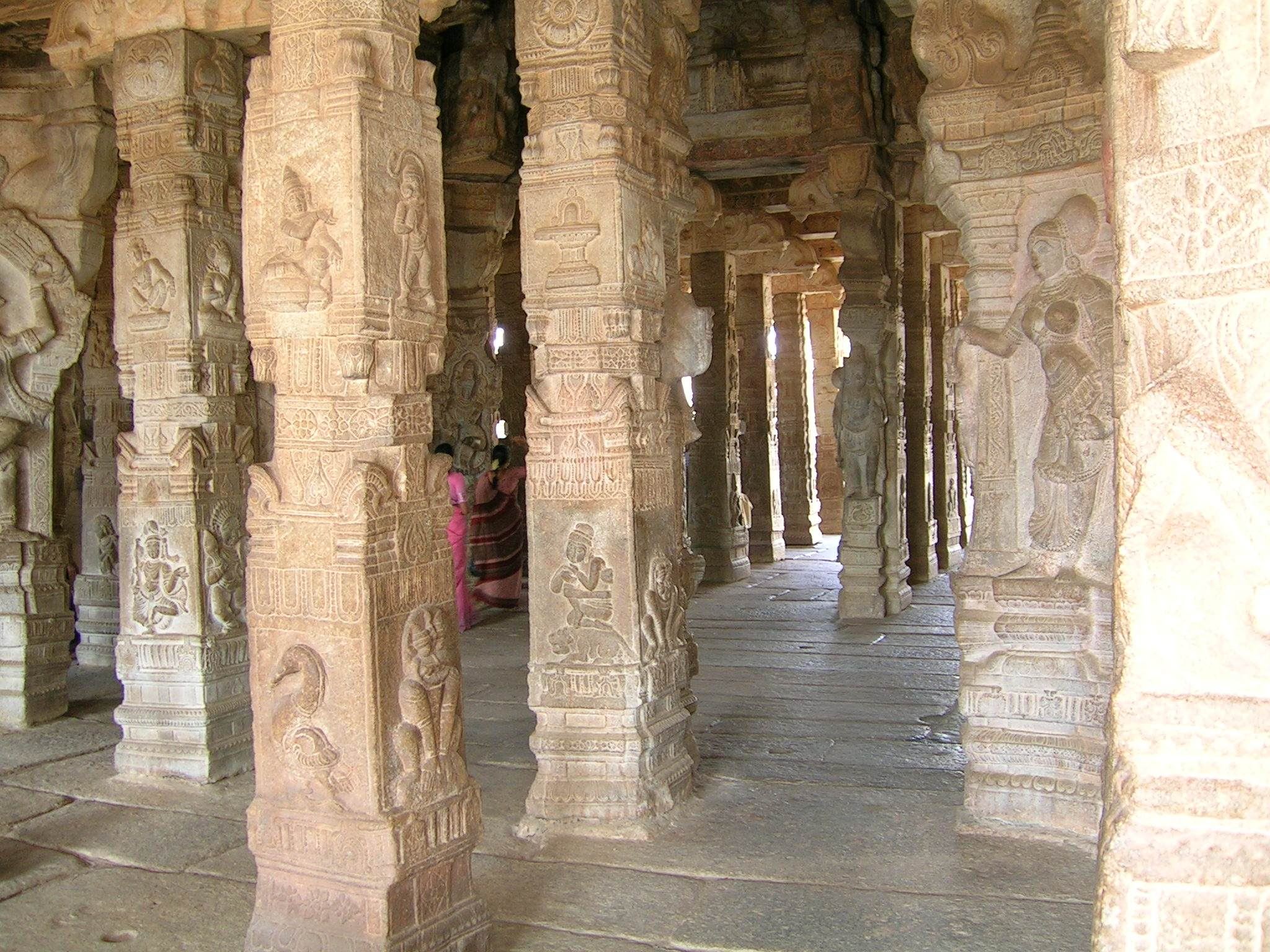
Pillared hall in Veera Bhadra temple, Lepakshi

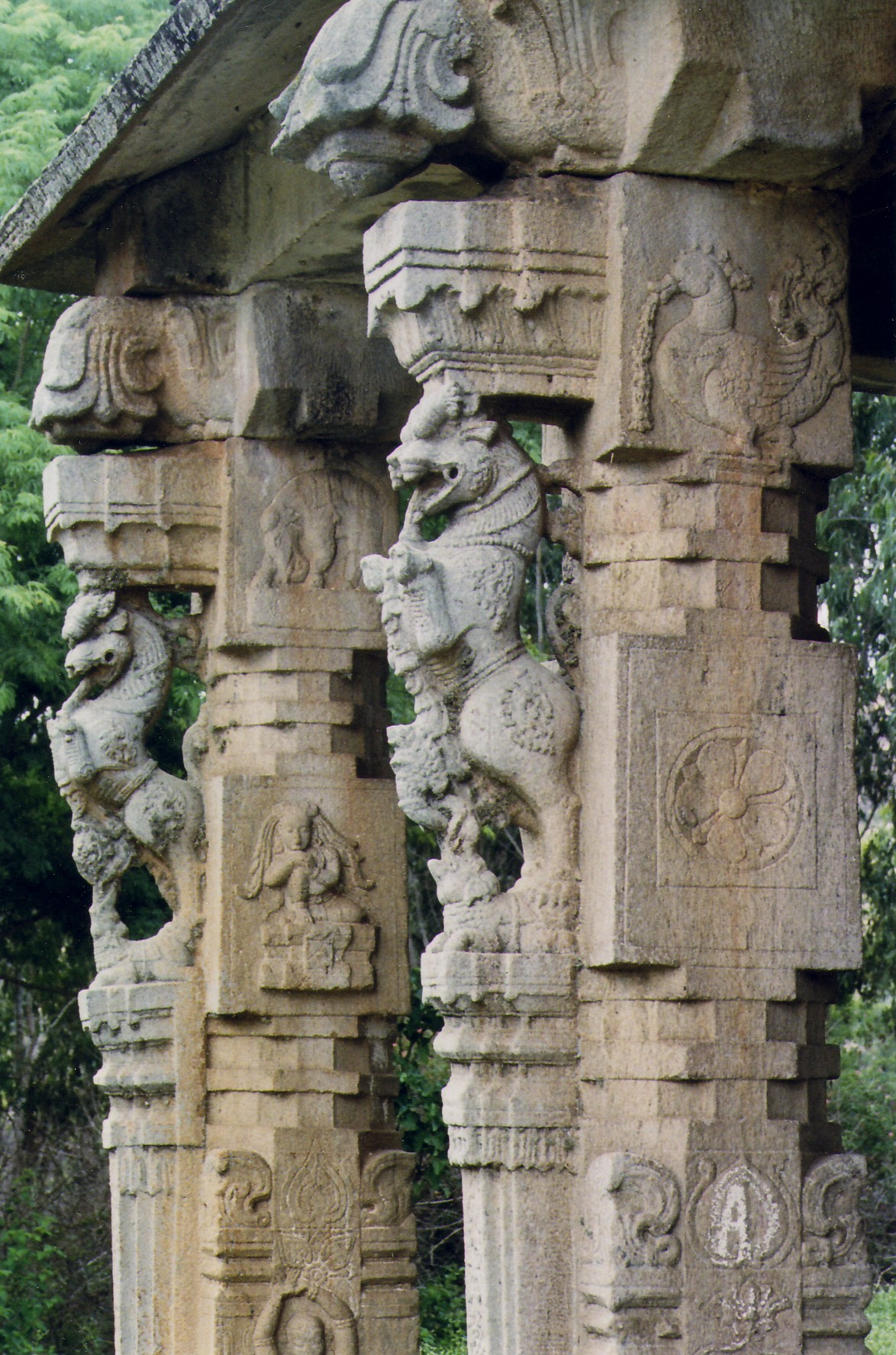
A mantapa with hippogryphs at Melkote

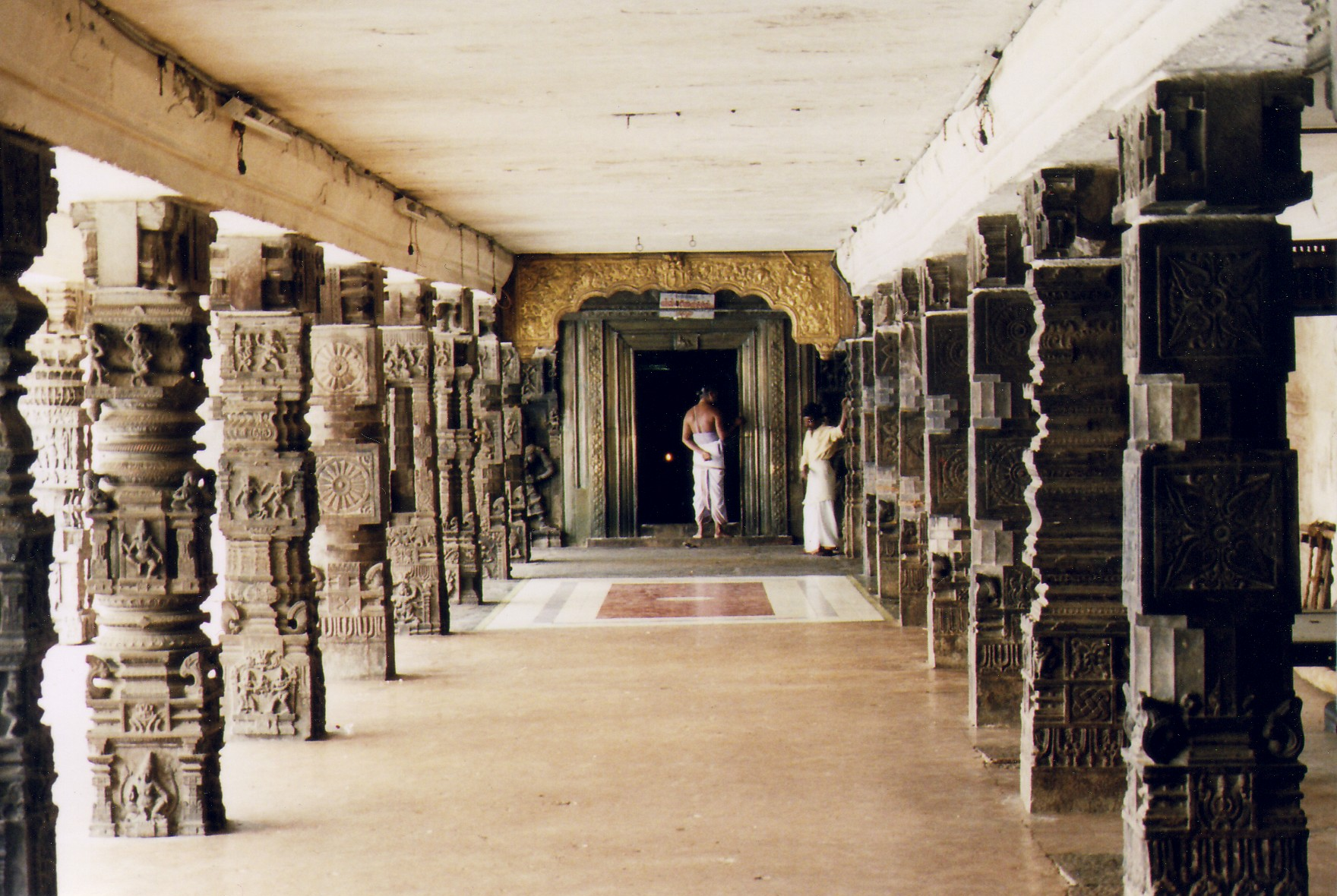
Ornate pillared Kalyanamantapa in Cheluva Narayana temple, Melkote

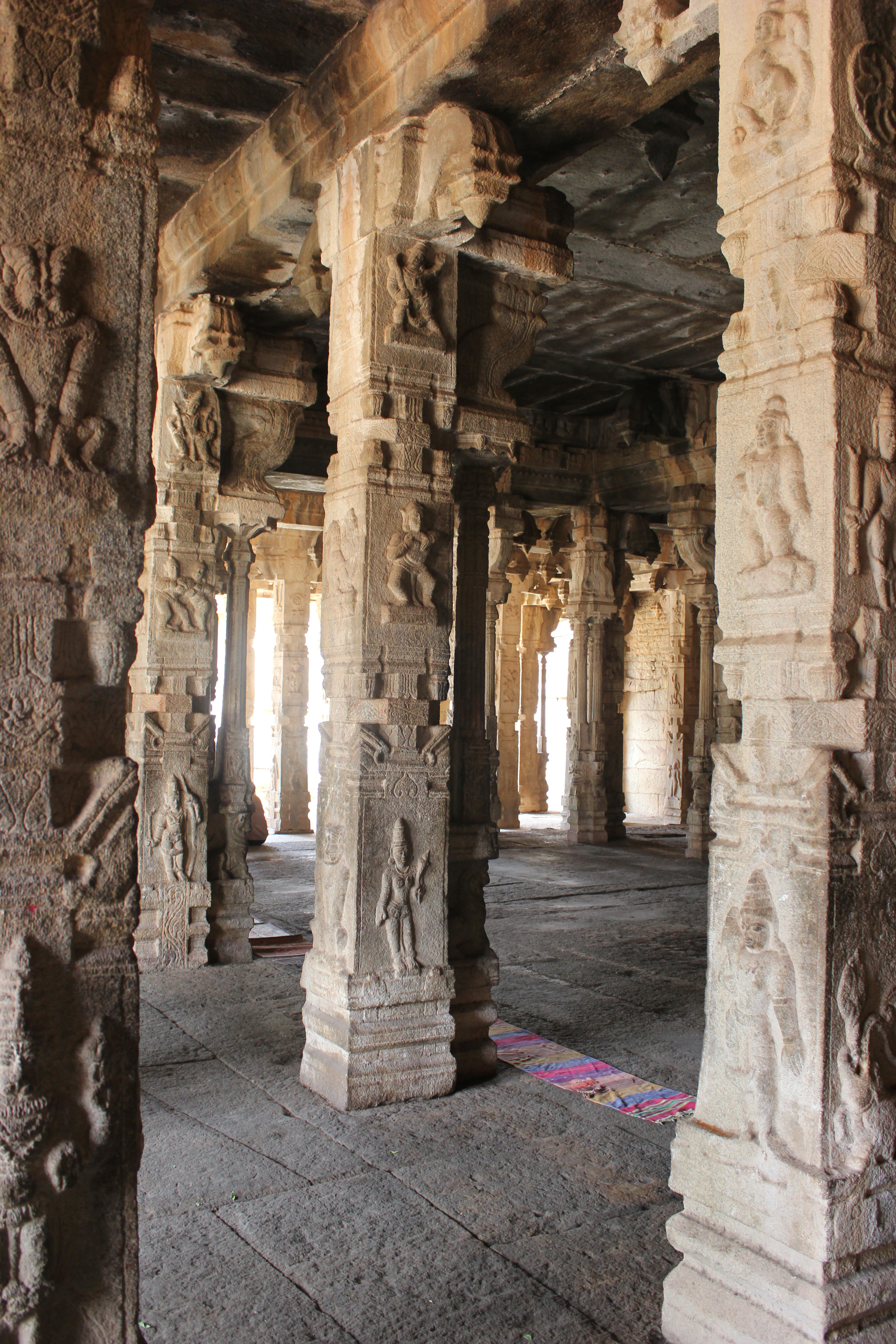
Pillared hall in Raghunatha temple, Hampi

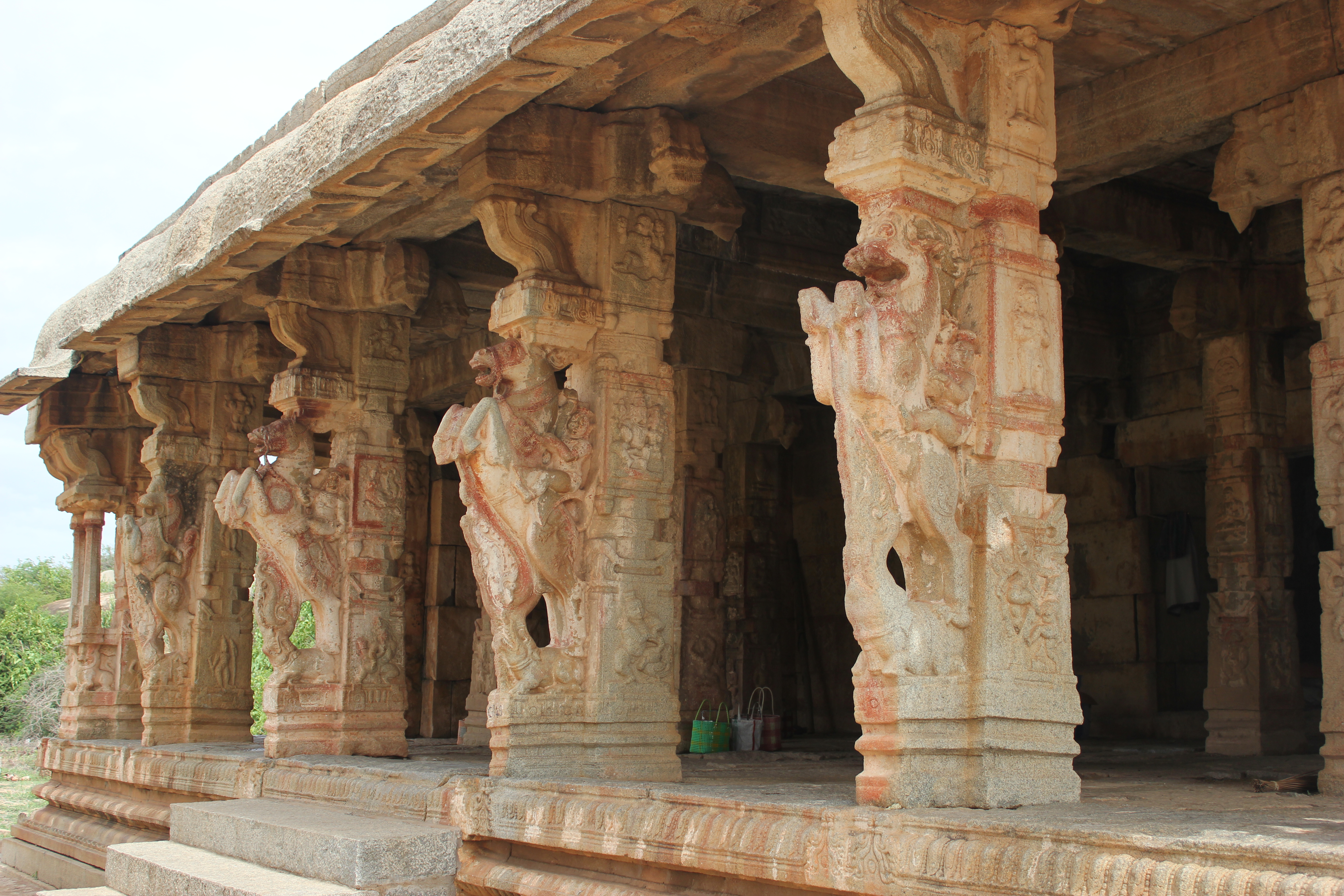
Kudure Gombe (horse doll) mantapa in Hampi

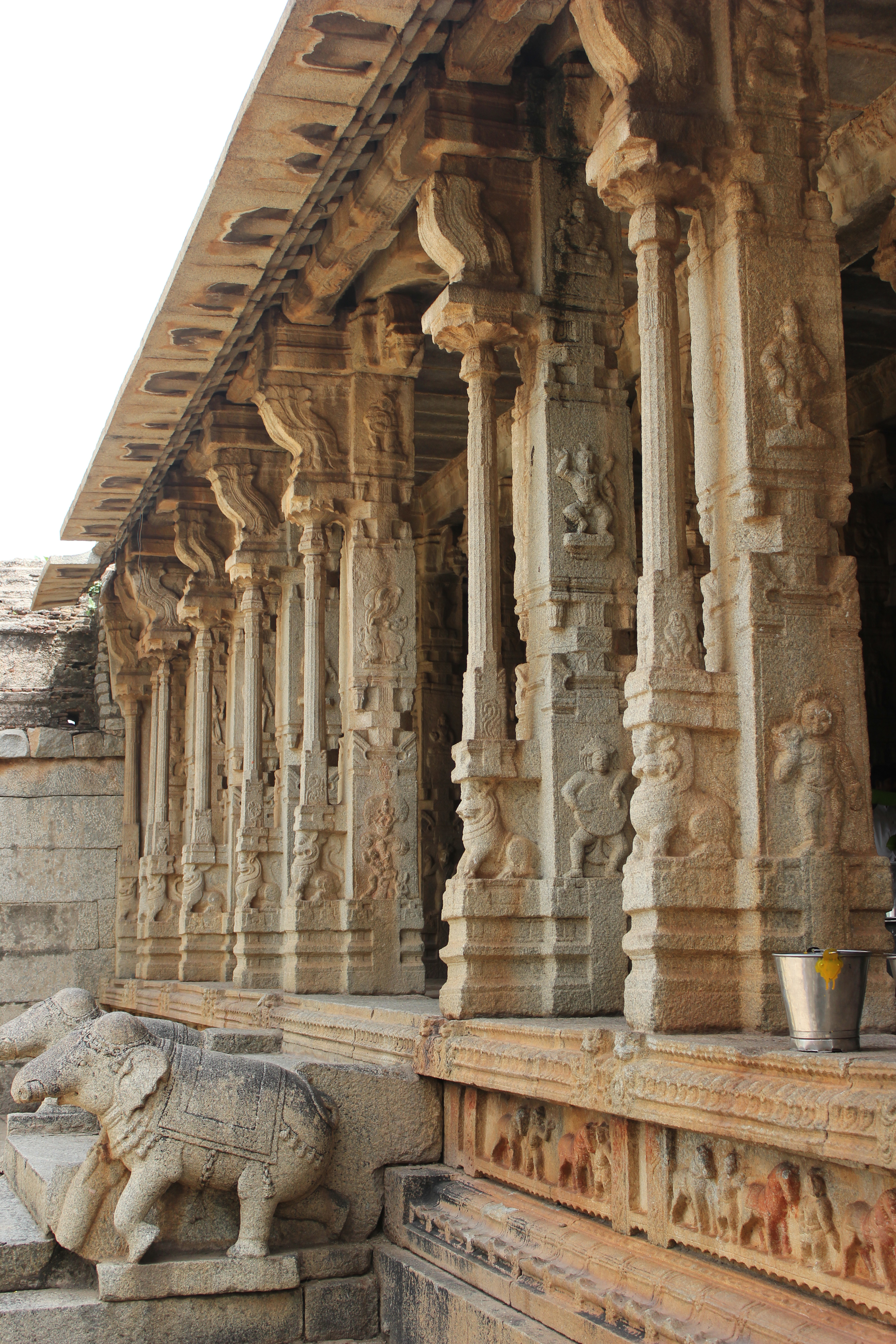
Elephant balustrade leading to open mantapa in Raghunatha temple in Hampi

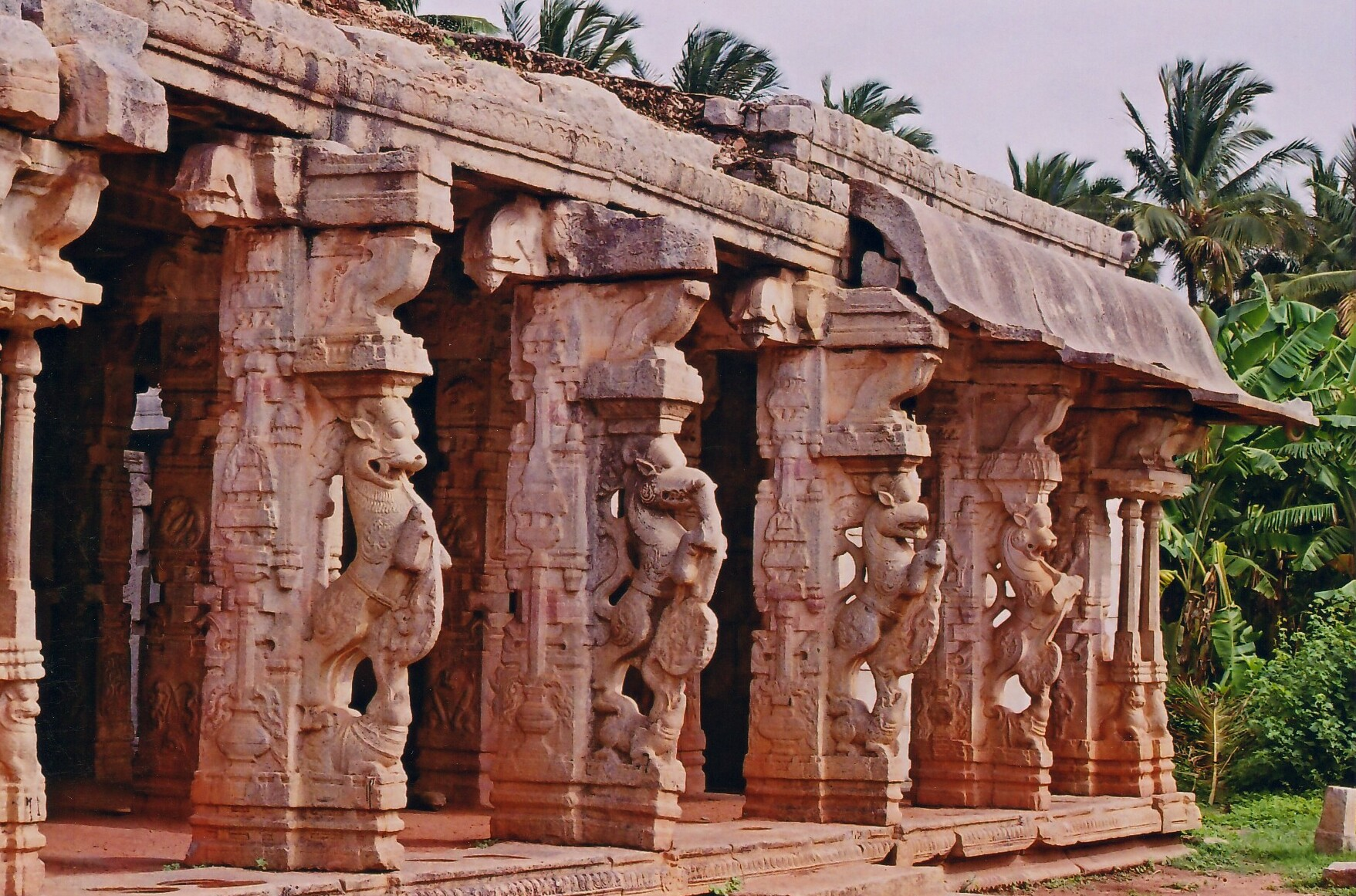
Yali pillars with Hippogryphs at Hampi

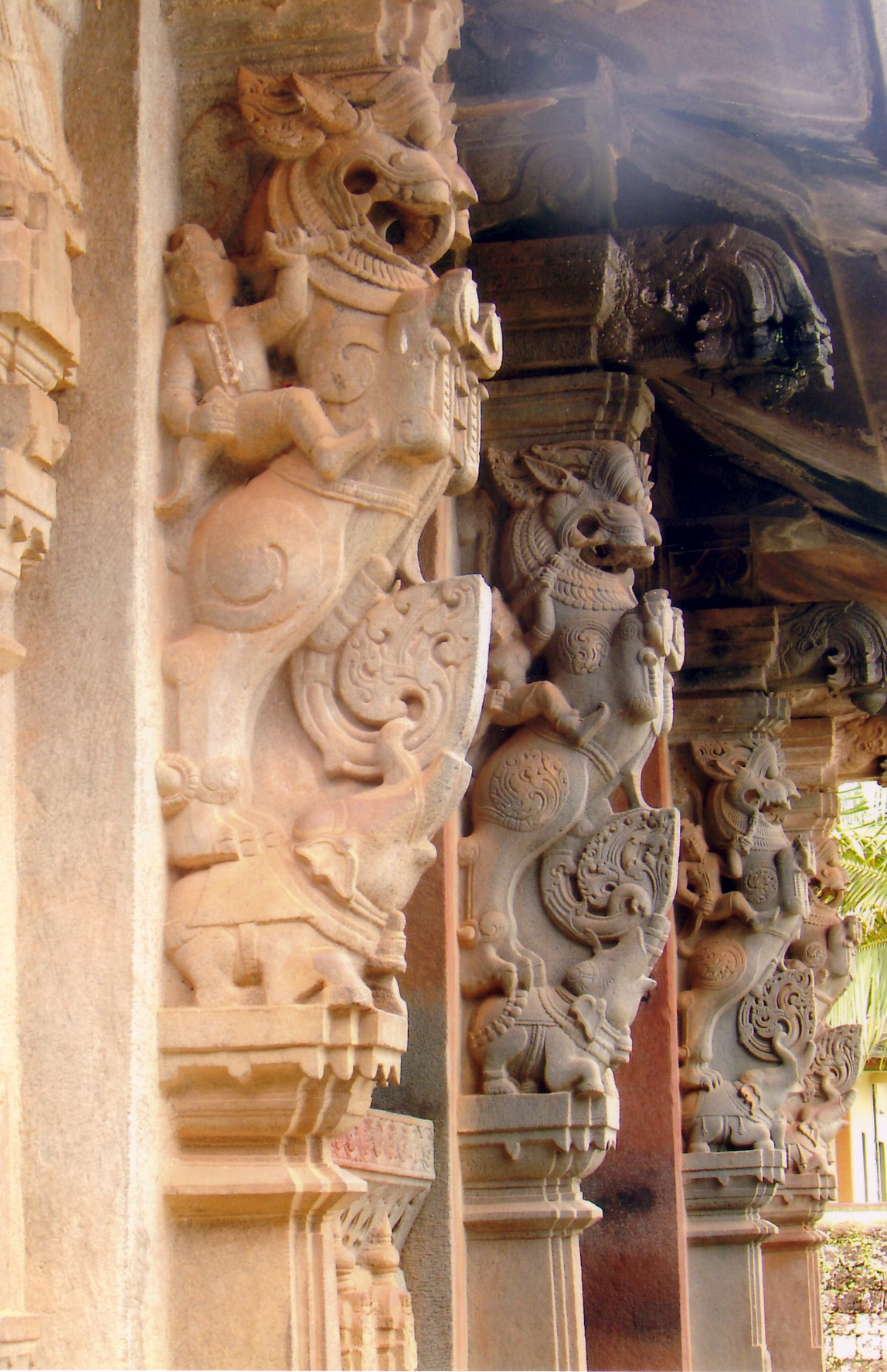
Yali pillars in Aghoreshwara Temple at Ikkeri in Shimoga District

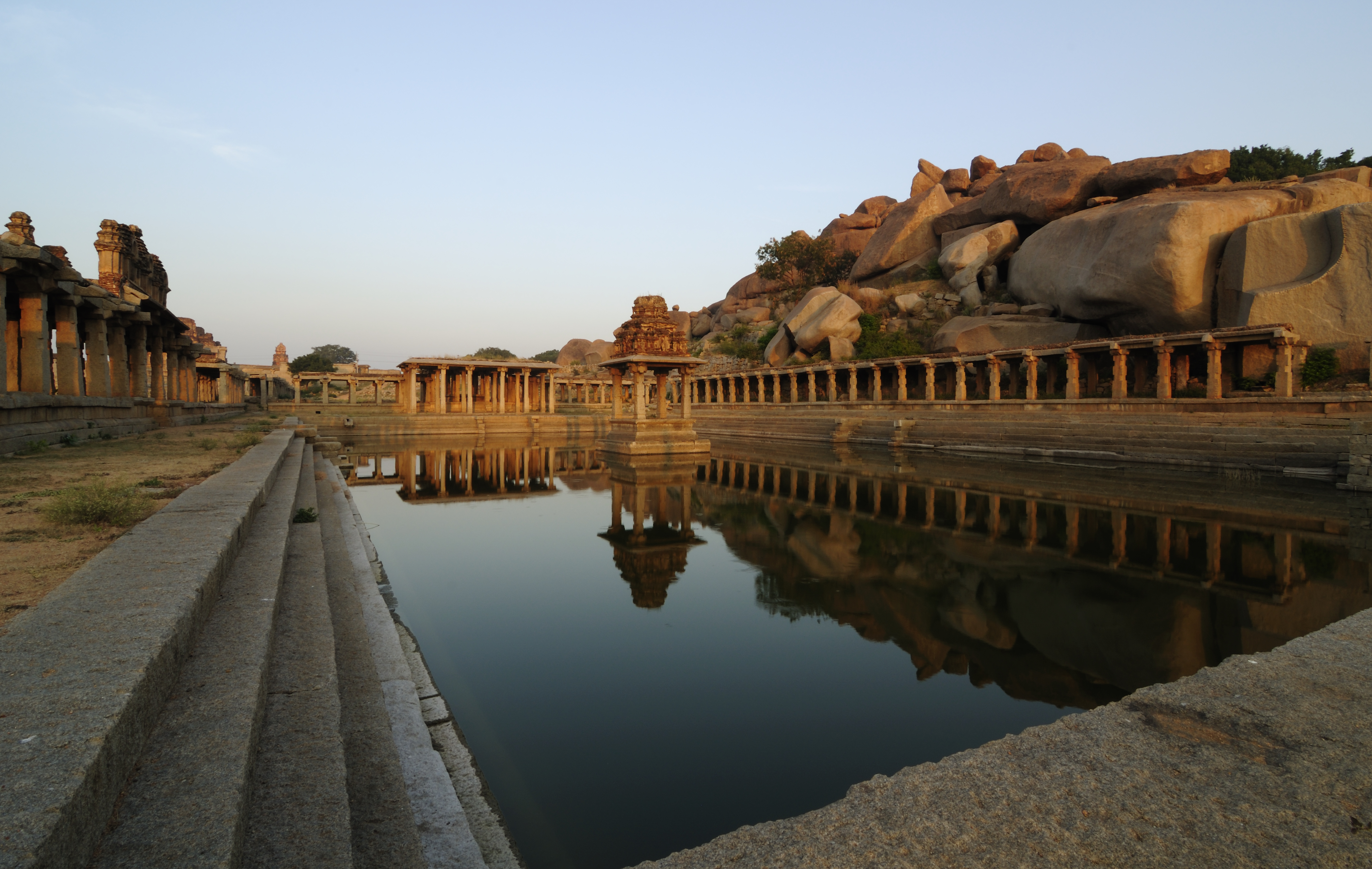
Market place at Hampi and the sacred tank located near the Krishna temple

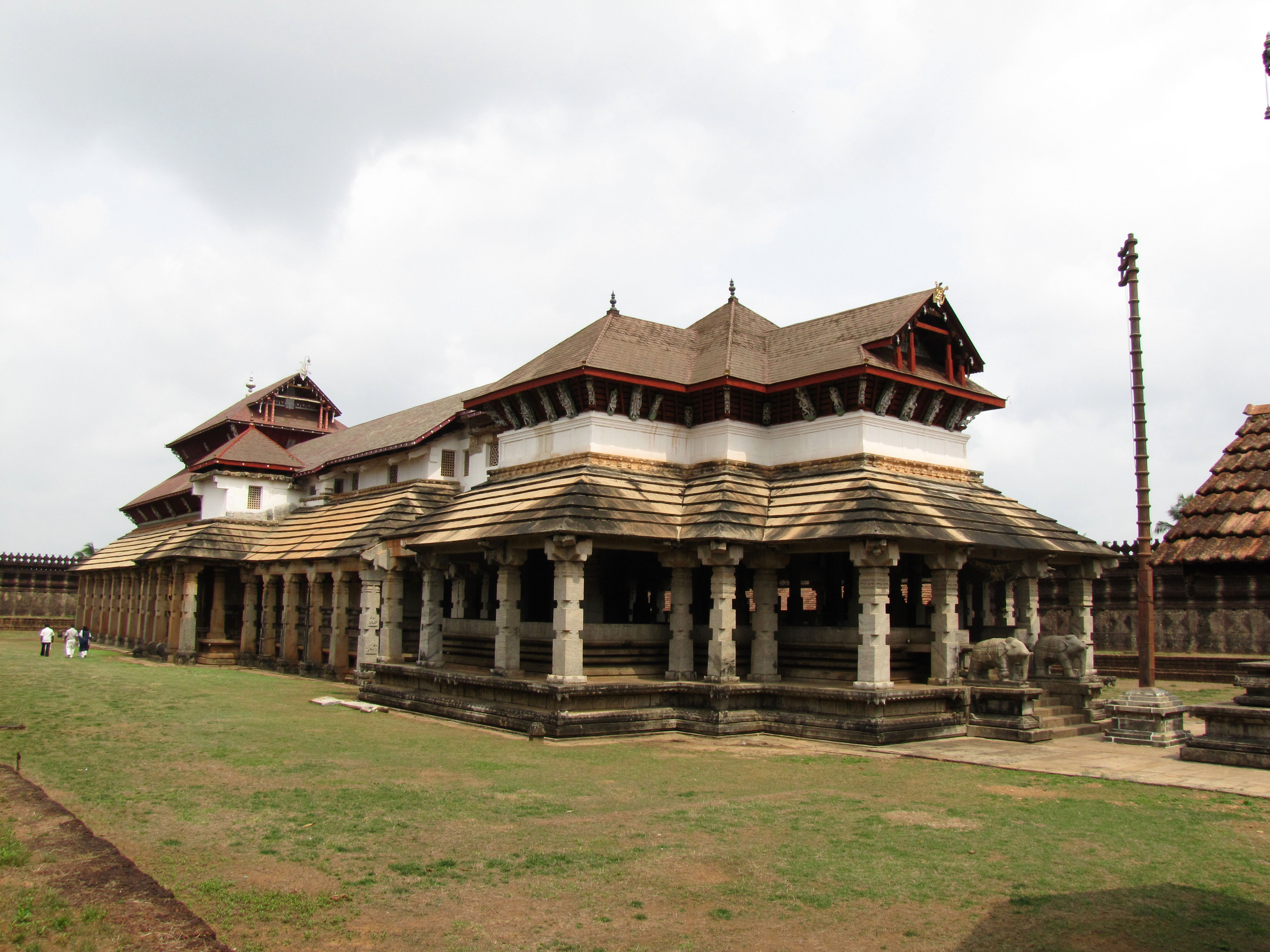
Saavira Kambada Basadi features 1000 pillars

== Terminology ==
- Mantapa – pillared hall
- Mahamantapa – Open pillared hall
- Rangamantapa – Closed pillared hall
- Kalyanamantapa – Hall meant for celebrations and special occasions
- Garbhagriha – Sanctum where the idol of God is placed
- Navaranga or Antrala – passage the connects different Sanctums
- Shukanasi – Antechamber

== See also ==
- Vijayanagara
- Hampi
- Lepakshi
- Srikalahasti
- Vijayanagar Empire
- Hoysala architecture
- Indian architecture
