= Adi (name) =

Adi (עָדִי or עַדִי, depending on the emphasis on the second syllable (female) or the first (male)) is a Hebrew-language unisex given name, which means "jewel" or "ornament". It also means "my witness" (עֵדִי 'edi) in Hebrew.

In Arabic, the title Adi (عَدِي) was common in military distinctions in the early Islamic era. It means "the one who charges" in battle or sports.

Adi or Aadi (आदि) is also a male Sanskrit given name, which means "first", "original", and "superior".

The name also functions as a nickname for Adolf in German and Adrian in Romanian.

== First name ==
- Adi Adilović (born 1983), Bosnian football goalkeeper
- Adi Alsaid (born 1987), Mexican author
- Adi Altschuler (born 1986), Israeli educator and entrepreneur
- Adi Ashkenazi (born 1975), Israeli actress
- Adi Barkan, Israeli model agent and activist
- Adi Ben-Israel (born 1933), American mathematician, engineer, and professor
- Adi Unaisi Biau, Fijian rugby union player
- Adi Bichman (born 1983), Israeli swimmer
- Adi Bielski (born 1982), Israeli actress
- Adi Bitar (1924–1973), Palestinian judge
- Adi Bolakoro (born 1985), Fijian netball goalkeeper
- Adi Braun (born 1962), Canadian jazz and cabaret vocalist and composer
- Adi Bulsara (born 1951), Indian scientist
- Adi Carauleanu (born 1957), Romanian actor
- Adi Da (1939–2008), American spiritual teacher, writer, and artist, born as Franklin Albert Jones
- Adi Darma (1960–2020), Indonesian politician
- Adolf Dassler (1900-1978), German founder of Adidas
- Adi Dick (born 1978), New Zealand singer-songwriter and producer
- Adilson dos Santos (born 1976), Brazilian footballer
- Adi Ezroni (born 1978), Israeli actress, model, producer, and television host
- Adi Fahrudin (born 1966), Indonesian academic
- Adi Funk (1951–2010), Austrian motorcycle speedway rider
- Adi Gafni, Israeli sprint canoer
- Adi Gevins, American radio documentarian, producer, educator, archivist, and creative consultant
- Adi Godrej (born 1942), Indian industrialist
- Adi Gordon (born 1966), Israeli professional basketball player
- Adi Granov (born 1978), Bosnian comic artist
- Adi Hasak (born 1964), American writer
- Adi Havewala (1917–2001), Indian cyclist
- Adi Himelbloy (born 1984), Israeli actress
- Adi Hütter (born 1970), Austrian football player
- Adi Ignatius (born 1959), American journalist
- Adi Irani, Indian actor
- Adi Eko Jayanto (born 1994), Indonesian footballer
- Adi Kanga (1923–2013), Indian civil engineer, writer, and city planner
- Adi Asya Katz (born 2004), Israeli gymnast
- Adi Keissar (born 1980), Israeli poet
- Adi Koll (born 1976), Israeli politician
- Adi Konstantinos (born 1994), Israeli footballer
- Adi Kurdi (1948–2020), Indonesian actor
- Adi Lev (1953–2006), Israeli actress
- Adi Lukovac (1970–2006), Bosnian musician
- Adi Malla (694–710 CE.), founder of the Mallabhum
- Adi Pherozeshah Marzban (1914–1987), Indian playwright, actor, director, and broadcaster
- Adi Mehremić (born 1992), Bosnian footballer
- Adi Meyerson (born 1991), Israeli jazz bassist
- Adi Mešetović (born 1997), Bosnian swimmer
- Sheikh Adi ibn Musafir (1072-1078–1162), Kurdish sheikh
- Adi Nalić (born 1997), Bosnian footballer
- Adi Nes (born 1966), Israeli photographer
- Adi Nimni (born 1991), Israeli footballer
- Adi Nugroho (born 1992), Indonesian footballer
- Adi Ophir (born 1951), Israeli philosopher
- Adi Parwa (born 1994), Indonesian footballer
- Adi Pinter (1948–2016), Austrian football manager
- Adi Popovici (born 1969), Romanian handball player
- Adi Prag (born 1957), Israeli swimmer
- Adi Ran (born 1961), Israeli singer
- Adi Rocha (born 1985), Brazilian footballer
- Adi Roche (born 1955), Irish politician and activist
- Adi Said (born 1990), Bruneian footballer
- Adi Sasono (1943–2016), Indonesian politician
- Adi Satryo (born 2001), Indonesian football goalkeeper
- Adi Schwartz, Israeli journalist and academic
- Adi M. Sethna (died 2006), Indian Army General
- Adi Shamir (born 1952), Israeli cryptographer
- Adi Shankar (born 1985) https://en.wikipedia.org/wiki/Adi_Shankar_(producer) , Indian-American film producer, screenwriter, film director, television program creator, television showrunner, and actor
- Adi Shankara (788–820), Indian philosopher
- Adi Shilon (born 1987), Israeli radio presenter, actress, and television host
- Adi Smolar (born 1959), Slovenian singer-songwriter
- Adi Andojo Soetjipto (1932–2022), Indonesian jurist and lecturer
- Adi Soffer (born 1987), Israeli footballer
- Adi Sorek (born 1970), Israeli writer and editor
- Adi Stein (born 1986), Israeli footballer and coach
- Adi Stenroth (1896–1931), Finnish officer
- Adi Stern (born 1966), Israeli graphic designer and type designer
- Adi Talmor (1953–2011), Israeli journalist
- Adi Taviner (born 1990), Welsh rugby union player
- Adi Tuwai (born 1998), Fijian football goalkeeper
- Adi Ulmansky, Israeli rapper and music producer
- Adi Utarini (born 1965), Indonesian public health researcher
- Adi Viveash (born 1969), English footballer
- Adi Yussuf (born 1992), Tanzanian footballer

== Surname ==
- Fanendo Adi (born 1990), Nigerian footballer
- Sailom Adi (born 1986), Thai boxer

== See also ==
- Adi (disambiguation)
