= Adi =

Adi or ADI may refer to:

== Abbreviations ==
- Acceptable daily intake, in health and medicine
- Acting detective inspector, a type of police inspector
- Africa Development Indicators, a compilation of data assembled by the World Bank
- Alternating direction implicit method for solving partial differential equations
- Ángeles del Infierno, a Spanish heavy metal band
- Anti-detonant injection, another name for water injection in internal combustion engines
- Approved Driving Instructor, a qualified UK car driver trainer
- Area of dominant influence, term used by Arbitron in media marketing
- Authorised deposit-taking institution, a corporation authorised under the Australian Commonwealth Banking Act 1959
- Autism Diagnostic Interview, a parent interview used to aid diagnosis of autism

== Aviation ==
- Aerodynamics Inc., a small airline in the US
- Aircraft Designs Inc, an aircraft design firm in Monterey, California
- IATA airport code for Arandis Airport in Erongo Region, Namibia
- Attitude direction indicator, an enhanced form of artificial horizon

== Names and titles ==
- Adi (mythology), an Asura in Hindu faith who appears in the Matsya Purāṇa
- Adi (name), a given name in Hebrew and a nickname in other languages
- Adi Shankara, the First Shankara, Indian philosopher, founder of the Advaita-Vedanta school and the religious order
- Adi (title), a Fijian title used by females of chiefly rank

== Organizations ==
- ADI Corporation, a defunct Taiwanese computer monitor manufacturer
- Alfred Deakin Institute, at Deakin University, in Geelong, Australia
- American Documentation Institute, former name of the Association for Information Science and Technology
- Analog Devices, Inc., producer of semiconductors
- Animal Defenders International, a nonprofit campaigning group
- Associazione per il Disegno Industriale
- Australian Defence Industries, former name of Thales Australia
- Australian Doctors International
- Independent Democratic Action (Portuguese: Acção Democrática Independente), a political party in São Tomé and Príncipe

== Places ==
- Adi (Chikodi), Belgaum District, Karnataka, India
- Adi Island, an island in West Papua, Indonesia
- Adi, Israel, a community settlement in northern Israel
- Adi (Khanapur), Belgaum District, Karnataka, India
- Ahmedabad Junction railway station, Ahmedabad, India (code ADI)

== Other uses ==
- Adi (film), a 2023 Indian Malayalam-language comedy-drama film
- ADI 4277 and ADPF 132 v. Brazilian civil union, actions to civil union equality
- Adi language (Galo), a related language spoken by the Galo people of Arunachal Pradesh
- Adinatha, 1st Jain Tirthankara
- Adi Parva, the first book of the ancient Indian epic Mahabharata
- Adi people, a tribe living in Arunachal Pradesh, India
  - Adi language, the Tibeto-Burman language spoken by the Adi
- Adi tala, a tala (rhythm) in Carnatic music
- Banu Adi, a clan of the Quraish tribe of Mecca
- Mancala, a variant of the game

== See also ==
- Aadi (disambiguation)
- Addi (disambiguation)
- Adhi (disambiguation)
- Adis (disambiguation)
- ADY (disambiguation)
