= Amate (village) =

Coordinates: 15°42′0″N 74°17′44″E

- Village
- Interactive map of Amate
- Country: India
- State: Karnataka
- Division: Belagavi
- District: Belagavi
- Taluk: Khanapur
- Locality: Amate

Area
  - Total: 14.27 km^{2} (5.51 sq mi)
- Elevation: 651 m (2,136 ft)

Population
  - Total: 1,513

Amate is a village in the Khanapur taluk of the Belagavi district, Karnataka, India. It has a total area of about 14.27 square kilometers. Amate is the gram panchayat for Habbanatti village. In 2011, the village had access to public and private bus services and a railway station. The pincode for Amate is 591345.

== Population ==
According to the 2011 census, the village has a total population of 1,513, with 773 males and 740 females. The village has a literacy rate of approximately 53.67%. The Scheduled Caste population is 13, with 7 males and 6 females. The Scheduled Tribe population is 270, with 126 males and 144 females. There are approximately 292 households in Amate, with the average household size being 5 persons per house.
