= Bhalake =

Bhalake may refer to:

- Bhalake (B.K.), a village in Karnataka, India
- Bhalake (K.H.), a village in Karnataka, India
