= Kamsinkop =

- Village
- Location within Karnataka Location within India
- Coordinates: 15°39′58″N 74°36′06″E
- Country: India
- State: Karnataka
- District: Belgaum
- Talukas: Khanapur

Languages
  - Official: Kannada
- Time zone: UTC+5:30 (IST)

Kamsinkop is a village in Belgaum district in Karnataka, India.
