= Manjarpai (K.G.) =

Manjarpali (K.G.)
- Village
- Country: India
- State: Karnataka
- District: Belgaum
- Talukas: Khanapur

Languages
  - Official: Kannada
- Time zone: UTC+5:30 (IST)

Manjarpai (K.G.) is a village in Belgaum district of Karnataka, India.
