= Mendegali =

Coordinates: 15°30′22″N 74°36′33″E

- Village
- Interactive map of Mendegali
- Country: India
- State: Karnataka
- District: Belgaum
- Talukas: Khanapur

Languages
  - Official: Kannada
- Time zone: UTC+5:30 (IST)

Mendegali is a village in the Belgaum district of Karnataka, India.
