= Bacholi, Belagavi =

Bacholi
- Village
- Country: India
- State: Karnataka
- District: Belagavi

Languages
  - Official: Kannada
- Time zone: UTC+5:30 (IST)

Bacholi is a village in Khanapur taluka of Belagavi district in the southern state of Karnataka, India. According to the 2011 Census, Bacholi had a population of 1,959, with 972 males and 987 females.
