= Chikhale, Belgaum =

Chikhale
- Village
- Country: India
- State: Karnataka
- District: Belagavi

Languages
  - Official: Kannada
- Time zone: UTC+5:30 (IST)

Chikhale is a village in Khanapur taluka of Belagavi district in the southern state of Karnataka, India. According to the 2011 Census of India, the village had a population of 718 people, with 363 males and 355 females.
