= Singinkop =

- Village
- Country: India
- State: Karnataka
- District: Belgaum
- Talukas: Khanapur

Government
  - Type: Panchayat raj

Languages
  - Official: Kannada Marathi
- Time zone: UTC+5:30 (IST)

Singinkop is a village in Belgaum district of Karnataka, India. The village is famous for its traditional pottery culture.
