= Lokoli =

- Village
- Location in Karnataka, India Lokoli (India)
- Coordinates: 15°38′57″N 74°33′45″E
- Country: India
- State: Karnataka
- District: Belgaum
- Talukas: Khanapur

Languages
  - Official: Kannada
- Time zone: UTC+5:30 (IST)

Lokoli is a village in Belgaum district in Karnataka, India.
