= Jambegali =

- Village
- Country: India
- State: Karnataka
- District: Belgaum
- Taluka: Khanapur

Population (2019)
  - Total: 754

Languages. Marathi, Hindi
  - Official: Marathi
- Time zone: UTC+5:30 (IST)

Jambegali is a village in the Khanapur taluka of Belgaum district in the southern Indian state of Karnataka. As of the 2019 Indian census, it had a population of 754.
