= Mundwad-Pimpale =

Mundwad-Pimpale Mundwad
- Village
- Country: India
- State: Karnataka
- District: Belgaum
- Established: Early 1500-1600
- Founder: Marathas
- Talukas: Khanapur

Population (2001)
  - Total: 500−600

Languages
  - Official & Daily used: Kannada & Marathi
- Time zone: UTC+5:30 (IST)
- Postal code: 591301

Mundwad-Pimpale is a village in Belgaum district of Karnataka, India.
