= Dhokegali =

Coordinates: 15°35′N 74°30′E

- Village
- Interactive map of Dhokegali
- Country: India
- State: Karnataka
- District: Belgaum
- Talukas: Khanapur

Languages
  - Official: Kannada
- Time zone: UTC+5:30 (IST)

Dhokegali is a village in Belgaum district in the southern state of Karnataka, India.
