= Global Development Finance =

The World Bank’s Global Development Finance, External Debt of Developing Countries (GDF) is the sole repository for statistics on the external debt of developing countries on a loan-by-loan basis. This edition of GDF presents reported or estimated data on the total external debt of all low-and middle-income countries in both electronic and print formats. Data are shown for 128 individual countries that report to the World Bank's Debtor reporting System (DRS). GDF includes over 200 time series indicators from 1970 to 2009, for most reporting countries.

== Methodology and scope ==
GDF focuses on financial flows, trends in external debt, major economic aggregates, key debt ratios, average terms of new commitments, currency composition of long-term debt, debt restructuring, scheduled debt service projections, and other major financial indicators for developing countries.

The online database is updated twice a year, once in January and another in April, coinciding with the World Development Indicators database update. The GDF publication is released once a year in the month of January.

== Accessing the data ==
The World Bank’s Open Data site provides access to the GDF database free of charge to all users. A selection of GDF data is featured at data.worldbank.org. Users can browse the data by Country, Indicators, Topics, and Data Catalog. GDF is listed in the catalog and can be accessed directly via dataBank.

The Economic and Social Data Service (ESDS) International provides the macro-economic datasets free of charge for members of UK higher and further education institutions. In order to access the data, users have to be registered which can be done here.

== See also ==
- The World Bank
- World Development Indicators
- Africa Development Indicators
- ESDS International
