= Gandigwad =

Gandigawad
- Village
- Location in Karnataka, India Gandigawad (India)
- Coordinates: 15.90°N 75.50°E
- Country: India
- State: Karnataka
- District: Belgaum
- Talukas: Khanapur

Population (2001)
  - Total: 6,019

Languages
  - Official: Kannada
- Time zone: UTC+5:30 (IST)

Gandigawad is a village in the southern state of Karnataka, India. It is located in the Khanapur taluk of Belgaum district in Karnataka.

== Demographics ==
As of 2001 India census, Gandigwad had a population of 6019 with 3120 males and 2899 females.

== See also ==
- Belgaum
- Districts of Karnataka
