= GDF =

GDF may refer to:

- Civic Democratic Forum (Građanski demokratski forum), a political party in Serbia
- Gaz de France, a defunct French energy company
- General Data Format for Biomedical Signals
- Geographic Data Files
- Geological disposal facility
- Glasnost Defense Foundation, a Russian human rights organization
- Global Development Finance, an economic database
- Growth differentiation factor
- Guardia di Finanza, an Italian law enforcement agency
- Guduf-Gava language
- Guyana Defence Force
