= Devalatti =

- Village
- Location in Karnataka, India Devalatti (India)
- Coordinates: 15°40′35.7″N 74°35′23.8″E
- Country: India
- State: Karnataka
- District: Belgaum
- Talukas: Khanapur

Languages
  - Official: Kannada
- Time zone: UTC+5:30 (IST)

Devalatti is a village in Belgaum district in the southern state of Karnataka, India.
