= Nagurda =

Coordinates: 25°15′N 82°20′E

- Village
- Interactive map of Nagurda
- Country: India
- State: Karnataka
- District: Belgaum
- Talukas: Khanapur

Languages
  - Official: Kannada
- Time zone: UTC+5:30 (IST)

Nagurda is a village in Belgaum district of Karnataka, India.
