= ADY =

Ady or ADY may refer to:

== People ==
- András or Endre Ady (1877–1919), Hungarian poet
- Ady (surname)
- Adi (name), Hebrew-language given name
- Ady An (born 1980), Taiwanese actress
- Ady Berber (1913–1966), Austrian actor
- Ady (footballer) (born 1973), Tunisian footballer
- Ady Jean-Gardy, Haitian journalist
- Ady Schmit (born 1940), Luxembourgish footballer
- Ady Spencer (born 1973), English rugby league player
- Ady Stern (born 1960), Israeli physicist
- Ady Williams (born 1971), English footballer

== Places ==
- Ady, Oregon
- Ady, Texas
- Alldays Airport in Limpopo Province, South Africa (IATA airport code ADY)
- Azerbaijan Railways (Azeri: Azərbaycan Dəmir Yolu, ADY)

== See also ==
- Aadi (album), 2005, by Syrian singer Asalah Nasri
- Adi (disambiguation)
- Adyghe language
