= Chapagaon =

- Village
- Location in Karnataka, India Chapagaon (India)
- Coordinates: 15°37′53.6″N 74°34′58.2″E
- Country: India
- State: Karnataka
- District: Belgaum
- Talukas: Khanapur

Languages
  - Official: Kannada
- Time zone: UTC+5:30 (IST)

Chapagaon is a village in Belgaum district in the southern state of Karnataka, India.
