= Addi =

Addi or variation, may refer to:

== Places ==
- Addi, Punjab, India; a village

== People ==
=== Surname ===
- Goggo Addi (c. 1911–1999), Cameroonian storyteller
- Nour Imane Addi (born 1997), Moroccan soccer player

=== Given name ===
- Addi I, emir of the Emirate of Trarza
- Addi II, emir of the Emirate of Trarza
- Addi, bishop of the Bishopric of Edessa
- Addi (biblical figure), a figure in the Old Testament
- Addi Bâ (1916–1943), Senegalese-French WWII resistance fighter
- Addi Glunz (1916–2002), German WWII fighter ace
- Addi Somekh (born 1972), American balloon artist

== Other uses ==
- Alliance of Democrats for Integral Development (ADDI: French: Alliance des Démocrates pour le Développement Intégral), Togolese political party
- "Addi" (song), 1971 song by Duke Ellington off the album Togo Brava Suite
- addi, ADD Immediate, an RISC-V instruction

== See also ==
- Addis (disambiguation)
- Adi (disambiguation)
