= Thirthkunde =

- Village
- Country: India
- State: Karnataka
- District: Belgaum
- Talukas: Khanapur

Government
  - Type: Panchayat raj

Languages
  - Official: Kannada
- Time zone: UTC+5:30 (IST)

Thirthkunde is a village in Belgaum district of Karnataka, India.

The Village is known for Ramlingeshwar Temple which is situated just 1 kilometre (0.62 mi) away from the village on the hill at the way of Jamboti road. The original temple was built by Pandavas. However renovation was completed in 2019 with beautiful infrastructure built by a south Indian architect. Many devotees visit especially in the month of Shravan mas as per Hindhu panchang.
