= Torali =

Coordinates: 13°37′N 75°15′E

- Village
- Interactive map of Torali
- Country: India
- State: Karnataka
- District: Belgaum
- Talukas: Khanapur

Languages
  - Official: Kannada
- Time zone: UTC+5:30 (IST)

Torali is a village in Belgaum district of Karnataka, India.
