= Pastoli =

Coordinates: 15°36′N 74°21′E

- Village
- Interactive map of Pastoli
- Country: India
- State: Karnataka
- District: Belgaum
- Talukas: Khanapur

Languages
  - Official: Kannada
- Time zone: UTC+5:30 (IST)

Pastoli is a village in Belgaum district of Karnataka, India.
