= Kirhalashi =

- Village
- Country: India
- State: Karnataka
- District: Belgaum
- Talukas: Khanapur

Government
  - Type: Khanapur Town Panchayat
  - Body: [Khanapur, Karnataka Assembly constituency]

Population (2011)
  - Village: 464
  - Rural: 464
- Time zone: IST (UTC+5:30)
- Postal code: 591301
- Vehicle registration: KA 22

Kirhalashi is a village in Belgaum district in Karnataka, India. It has a population of 464 as recorded in the [2011 census of India]. It falls under the jurisdiction of Halaga Gram Panchayat and the Khanapur Block Panchayat in Khanapur District. The village has 110 households, contributing significantly to the rural administrative structure of Khanapur Sub-District.
