= Handur =

- Village
- Location in Karnataka, India Handur (India)
- Coordinates: 15°35′28.7″N 74°41′38.3″E
- Country: India
- State: Karnataka
- District: Belgaum
- Talukas: Khanapur

Languages
  - Official: Kannada
- Time zone: UTC+5:30 (IST)

Handur is a village in Belgaum district in the southern state of Karnataka, India.
