= Mendil =

Coordinates: 15°32′N 74°19′E

- Village
- Interactive map of Mendil
- Country: India
- State: Karnataka
- District: Belgaum
- Talukas: Khanapur

Languages
  - Official: Kannada
- Time zone: UTC+5:30 (IST)

Mendil is a village in Belgaum district of Karnataka, India.
