= Adiz =

Adiz or ADIZ may refer to:

- Ädiz clan, the second imperial clan of the Uyghur Khaganate
- Air defense identification zone, a region of airspace surrounding a country
  - Air Defense Identification Zone (North America), surrounding the US and Canada
  - Air Defense Identification Zone (East China Sea), covering most of the East China Sea

== See also ==
- Addis (disambiguation)
- Adis (disambiguation)
