= Kuppatagiri =

Kuppatgiri
- Village
- Interactive map of Kuppatgiri
- Coordinates: 15.6401935°N 74.5299518°E
- Country: India
- State: Karnataka
- District: Belgaum
- Talukas: Khanapur

Area 1.2m
  - Total: 5 km^{2} (1.9 sq mi)

Population (2001)
  - Total: 3,000
  - Density: 600/km^{2} (1,600/sq mi)

Language मराठी
  - Official: Kannada; marathi
- Time zone: UTC+5:30 (IST)
- Postal code: 591302
- Vehicle registration: KA22

Kuppatagiri is a village in Belgaum district in Karnataka, India.
