= Satanali =

- Village
- Country: India
- State: Karnataka
- District: Belgaum
- Talukas: Khanapur

Languages
  - Official: Kannada
- Time zone: UTC+5:30 (IST)

Satanali is a village in Belgaum district of Karnataka, India. It has a population of 172 as of 2011. It is located 27 km towards South from district headquarters Belgaum and is 520 km from State capital Bangalore. The village is administered by a Sarpanch elected by its population.
