= Khemewadi =

- Village
- Interactive map of Khemewadi
- Coordinates: 15°40′25.2″N 74°30′44.5″E
- Country: India
- State: Karnataka
- District: Belgaum
- Talukas: Khanapur

Population (2001)
  - Total: 358

Languages
  - Official: Kannada
- Time zone: UTC+5:30 (IST)

Khemewadi (Kannada: ಖೇಮವಾಡಿ) is a village in Belgaum district in Karnataka, India. As of 2011, Khemewadi had a population of 358. 69.44% of the population was literate, male literacy stood at 74.53%, while female literacy stood at 64.42%. A total of 73 houses were counted in 2011.
