= Abanali =

- Village
- Abanali is in Belgaum district
- Interactive map of Abanali
- Country: India
- State: Karnataka
- District: Belgaum
- Talukas: Khanapur

Government
  - Type: Panchayat raj
  - Body: Village Panchayat

Languages
  - Official: Kannada
- Time zone: UTC+5:30 (IST)
- ISO 3166 code: IN-KA
- Vehicle registration: KA
- Nearest city: Belgaum
- Civic agency: Village Panchayat
- Website: karnataka.gov.in

Abanali is a village in the southern state of Karnataka, India. It is located in the Khanapur taluk of Belgaum district in Karnataka.

== See also ==
- Belgaum
- Districts of Karnataka
