= Kukenatti Alias (Ramapur) =

- Village
- Nickname: ramapur
- Country: India
- State: Karnataka
- District: Belgaum
- Talukas: Khanapur

Population (2001)
  - Total: 400

Languages
  - Official: Kannada
- Time zone: UTC+5:30 (IST)

Kukenatti Alias (Ramapur) is a village in Belgaum district in Karnataka, India.
