= Savargali =

- Village
- Country: India
- State: Karnataka
- District: Belgaum
- Talukas: Khanapur

Government
  - Type: Panchayat raj

Languages
  - Official: Kannada
- Time zone: UTC+5:30 (IST)

Savargali is a village in Belgaum district, Karnataka state, India. According to the 2011 Indian census, Savargali has a population of 518 people with 266 males, 252 females and 63 children. The village has a literacy rate of 75.82%. It is administered by a sarpanch under the Panchayati Raj and is a part of the Shindholli Gram Panchayat.
