= Adhi =

Adhi may refer to:

- Adhi, Rawalpindi, a village in Punjab, Pakistan
- Adhi, Jalandhar, a village in Punjab, India
- Aadhi (disambiguation), several topics related to South India
- Adhi College of Engineering and Technology, in Chennai, India

== See also ==
- Adi (disambiguation)
