= Anagadi =

- Village
- Country: India
- State: Karnataka
- District: Belgaum
- Talukas: Khanapur

Languages
  - Official: Marathi
- Time zone: UTC+5:30 (IST)

Anagadi is a village in Belgaum district in the southern state of Karnataka, India. The official spoken languages of this region is Marathi.

Anagadi Pin code is 591120 and postal head office is Nandgad. Gunji (11 km), Londa (13 km), Chapagaon (13 km), Mangenkopp (14 km), Lokoli (15 km) are the nearby Villages to Anagadi.
