= Tolagi =

- Village
- Location in Karnataka, India Tolagi (India)
- Coordinates: 15°37′58″N 74°39′30″E
- Country: India
- State: Karnataka
- District: Belgaum
- Talukas: Khanapur

Languages
  - Official: Kannada
- Time zone: UTC+5:30 (IST)

Tolagi is a village in Belgaum district of Karnataka, India.
