= Sangargali =

Coordinates: 15°33′N 74°29′E

- Village
- Interactive map of Sangargali
- Country: India
- State: Karnataka
- District: Belgaum
- Talukas: Khanapur

Languages
  - Official: Marathi, Hindi, Kannada
- Time zone: UTC+5:30 (IST)

Sangargali is a tourist village in Belgaum district of Karnataka, India.
