= Adis =

- Gender: Male

Other gender
- Feminine: Adisa

Origin
- Meaning: New, sunrise

Other names
- Variant forms: Edis, Addis

Adis is a male given name.

In the Balkans, Adis is popular among Bosniaks in the former Yugoslav nations. The name is a modification to the name Edis, and it holds the same meanings of sunrise In the region, there is also a female equivalent: Adisa (for example, Adisa Azapagic).

== Given name ==
- Adis Ahmetovic, (born 1993), German-Bosnian politician
- Adis Bećiragić (born 1970), Bosnian basketball player
- Adis Jahović (born 1987), Macedonian soccer player
- Adis Lagumdzija (born 1989), Turkish volleyball player
- Adis Nurković (born 1986), Kosovar soccer player
- Adis Obad (born 1971), Bosnian soccer player and manager

== See also ==
- The Abu Dhabi Indian School, Abu Dhabi, United Arab Emirates
- Adis, Carthaginian Empire; former name of Roman Empire era Uthina
- Battle of Adis (255 BCE) in the First Punic War
- Adis, a New Zealand medical publisher owned by Springer Science+Business Media

== See also ==
- Adiss Harmandian (1945–2019) Lebanese-Armenian pop singer
- Addis (disambiguation)
- Adiz (disambiguation)
- Adi (disambiguation)
