= Dukkarwadi =

- Village
- Interactive map of Dukkarwadi
- Coordinates: 15.5794°N 74.957°E
- Country: India
- State: Karnataka
- District: Belgaum
- Talukas: Khanapur

Languages
  - Official: Kannada
- Time zone: UTC+5:30 (IST)

Dukkarwadi is a village in Belgaum district in the southern state of Karnataka, India.
