= Manikwadi =

- Village
- Manikwadi
- Country: India
- State: Karnataka
- District: Belgaum
- Founder: Ganesh Devappa Gavada
- Talukas: Khanapur

Languages
  - Official: Marathi
- Time zone: UTC+5:30 (IST)
- Postal code: 591302

Manikwadi is a village in Belgaum district of Karnataka, India.
