= Lakkebail =

- Village
- Location in Karnataka, India Lakkebail (India)
- Coordinates: 15°39′37.4″N 74°34′42.4″E
- Country: India
- State: Karnataka
- District: Belgaum
- Talukas: Khanapur

Languages
  - Official: Kannada
- Time zone: UTC+5:30 (IST)

Lakkebail is a village in Belgaum district in Karnataka, India.
