= Hattar Gunji =

Hattargunji
- Village
- Nickname: Hattargunji
- Country: India
- State: Karnataka
- District: Belgaum
- Talukas: Khanapur

Languages
  - Official: Kannada
- Time zone: UTC+5:30 (IST)

Hattar Gunji is a village in khanapur Talukha and Belgaum district in the southern state of Karnataka, India. It comes under Hattar Gunji Panchayath. It belongs to Belgaum Division. Bharatiya Janata Party, BJP, Indian National Congress (INC), INC are the major political parties in this area.

Hattar Gunji Pin code is 591302 and postal head office is Khanapur Town. Hattar Gunji village is located in Khanapur Tehsil of Belgaum district in Karnataka, India. It is situated 3 km away from sub-district headquarter Khanapur and 32 km away from district headquarter Belgaum. As per 2009 stats, Halakarni is the gram panchayat of Hattar Gunji village.

The total geographical area of village is 286.11 hectares. Hattar Gunji has a total population of 713 peoples. There are about 155 houses in Hattar Gunji village. Khanapur is nearest town to Hattar Gunji which is approximately 3 km away.
