= Ady (surname) =

Ady is a Hungarian surname. Notable people with the surname include:

- Cecilia Mary Ady (1881–1958), English writer, academic and historian
- Cindy Ady (born 1950), Canadian politician
- Endre Ady (1877–1919), Hungarian poet
- Jack Ady (1932–2019), Canadian politician
- Joseph Ady (c. 1770 – 1852), English criminal
- Julia Cartwright Ady (1851–1924), British historian and art critic
- Mariska Ady (1889–1977), Hungarian writer
- Peter Ady (1914–2004), English economist
- Thomas Ady (fl. 17th century), English writer
- William Ady (1816–1882), English Anglican clergyman
- William M. Ady (c. 1810 – 1872), American politician

== See also ==
- Ady (disambiguation)
