= Olamani =

Coordinates: 15°42′N 74°24′E

- Village
- Interactive map of Olamani
- Country: India
- State: Karnataka
- District: Belgaum
- Talukas: Khanapur

Languages
  - Official: Marathi, Kannada
- Time zone: UTC+5:30 (IST)

Olamani is a village in Belgaum district of Karnataka, India.
