= Shindoli =

Coordinates: 15°50′N 74°35′E

- Village
- Interactive map of Shindoli
- Country: India
- State: Karnataka
- District: Belgaum
- Talukas: Khanapur

Languages
  - Official: Kannada
- Time zone: UTC+5:30 (IST)

Shindoli is a village in Belgaum district of Karnataka, India.
