= Shedegali =

Coordinates: 15°37′N 74°30′E

- Village
- Interactive map of Shedegali
- Country: India
- State: Karnataka
- District: Belgaum
- Talukas: Khanapur

Languages
  - Official: Kannada
- Time zone: UTC+5:30 (IST)

Shedegali is a village in Belgaum district of Karnataka, India.
