= Betne =

Coordinates: 15°41′N 74°16′E

- Village
- Interactive map of Betne
- Country: India
- State: Karnataka
- District: Belgaum
- Talukas: Khanapur

Languages
  - Official: Kannada
- Time zone: UTC+5:30 (IST)

Betne is a village in Belgaum district in the southern state of Karnataka, India.
