= Suwatawadi =

- Village
- Location in Karnataka, India Suwatawadi (India)
- Coordinates: 15°25′38″N 74°33′21″E
- Country: India
- State: Karnataka
- District: Belgaum
- Talukas: Khanapur

Languages
  - Official: Kannada
- Time zone: UTC+5:30 (IST)

Suwatawadi is a village in Belgaum district of Karnataka, India.
