= Shindholi (K.H.) =

Shindholi (K.H.) Shindholi Khurd
- Village
- Country: India
- State: Karnataka
- District: Belgaum
- Talukas: Khanapur

Languages
  - Official: Kannada
- Time zone: UTC+5:30 (IST)
- ISO 3166 code: IN-KA

Shindholi (K.H.) is a village in Belgaum district of Karnataka, India.
