= Kusamalli =

- Village
- Location within Karnataka Location within India
- Coordinates: 15°43′00″N 74°22′57″E
- Country: India
- State: Karnataka
- District: Belgaum
- Tehsil: Khanapur

Languages
  - Official: Kannada
- Time zone: UTC+05:30 (IST)

Kusamalli is a village in Belgaum district in Karnataka, India.
