= Kalmani =

Coordinates: 22°10′N 74°40′E

- Village
- Interactive map of Kalmani
- Country: India
- State: Karnataka
- District: Belgaum
- Talukas: Khanapur

Languages
  - Official: Kannada
- Time zone: UTC+5:30 (IST)

Kalmani is a village in Belgaum district in Karnataka, India.
