= Doddahosur =

Coordinates: 12°26′N 75°57′E

- Village
- Interactive map of Doddahosur
- Country: India
- State: Karnataka
- District: Belgaum
- Talukas: Khanapur

Languages
  - Official: Marathi, Kannada
- Time zone: UTC+5:30 (IST)

Doddahosur is a small village in Khanapur taluka in Belgaum district in the state of Karnataka, India. Most residents speak Marathi and the rest speak Kannada. The village comes under Lokoli Gram Panchayath and is 26 km south of the city of Belgaum and 5 km from Khanapur. The population is about 1000–1200.
