= Jatage =

- Village
- Nickname: Jataga
- Country: India
- State: Karnataka
- District: Belgaum
- Talukas: Khanapur

Area
  - Total: 4 km^{2} (1.5 sq mi)

Population (2001)
  - Total: 1,500
  - Density: 380/km^{2} (970/sq mi)

Languages
  - Official: Marathi
- Time zone: UTC+5:30 (IST)
- Postal code: 591120

Jatage is a village in Belgaum district in the southern state of Karnataka, India.
