= Edis (name) =

Male given name

- Gender: Male

Other gender
- Feminine: Edisa

Origin
- Meaning: New, sunrise

Other names
- Variant forms: Adis, Ediz

Edis is a male given name.

In the Balkans, Edis is popular among Bosniaks in the former Yugoslav nations. The name is a modification to the name Adis, and it holds the same meanings of sunrise and new. In the region, there is also a female equivalent: Edisa.

== Given name ==
- Edis Elkasević, Croatian shot putter
- Edis A. Flewwelling (1918–2006), Canadian politician
- Edis Kurtić, Bosnian footballer
- Edis Mulalić, Bosnian footballer
- Edis Görgülü, British singer of Turkish descent
- Ediz Bahtiyaroğlu, Turkish footballer
- Ediz Hun (born 1940), Turkish film actor
- Ediz Yıldırımer (born 1993), Turkish swimmer

== Surname ==
- Andrew Edis (born 1957), English barrister and judge
- Daisy Edis (died 1964), British photographer
- Mirze Edis (born 1972), German politician
- Olive Edis (died 1955), British photographer
- Robert William Edis (died 1927), British architect
