= Addis =

Addis may refer to:

== Places ==
- Addis Ababa, the capital of Ethiopia
  - Addis Ababa University
  - Addis Ketema, a city district
- Addis, Louisiana, a town in West Baton Rouge Parish, Louisiana, US

== People ==
- Addis (name)
- Raptile (born 1976), stage name Addis, German-American singer and rapper

== Businesses ==
- The Addis Company, a defunct New York department store which merged with Dey Brothers
- Addis Housewares, a British household products company
- Addis Fortune, a newspaper
- Addis Standard, a news magazine

== See also ==
- Addis Ababa Agreement (disambiguation)
- Adis (disambiguation)
- Addi (disambiguation)
