= Degaon =

- Village
- Location in Karnataka, India Degaon (India)
- Coordinates: 15°34′17.2″N 74°45′12.2″E
- Country: India
- State: Karnataka
- District: Belgaum
- Talukas: Khanapur

Government
  - Type: STATE GOVT

Languages
- Time zone: UTC+5:30 (IST)

Degaon is a village in Belgaum district in the southern state of Karnataka, India. It is famous for Kadamba style Kamala Narayana Temple. The place name might have originated from its temples. Devagram or Degaon means "a village of Gods".
