= Aadi =

Aadi or Aadhi or AADI may refer to:

== Calendars ==
- Aadi (month), the fourth month of the Tamil calendar

== Media ==
=== Film ===
- Aadi (2002 film), a 2002 Telugu film
- Aadi (2005 film), a 2005 Kannada film
- Aathi, a 2006 Tamil film
- Aadi (2016 film), a 2016 Bengali film
- Aadhi, a 2018 Malayalam film

=== Actors ===
- Aadi (actor), a Telugu film actor
- Aadhi Pinisetty, a Tamil and Telugu film actor
- Aadi Adeal, a Pakistani Television actor

=== Music ===
- Aadi (album), 2005, by the Syrian singer Asalah Nasri
- Aadhi (singer), the lead vocalist of underground band Hiphop Tamizha

== Other ==
- AADI, association of musical interpreters in Argentina, founded in 1957

== See also ==
- Adi (disambiguation)
- Adhi (disambiguation)
- Aadi Perukku, Tamil monsoon festival
- Aathi, a 2006 Indian Tamil-language film
