= Modekop =

Coordinates: 15°41′N 74°27′E

- Village
- Interactive map of Modekop
- Country: India
- State: Karnataka
- District: Belgaum
- Talukas: Khanapur

Population (2011)
  - Total: 857

Languages
  - Official: Kannada
- Time zone: UTC+5:30 (IST)

Modekop is a village in Belgaum district of Karnataka, India. At the 2011 census the population was 857: 430 males and 427 females. The reported literacy rate of Modekop at the time of the census was 66.84%.
