= Raptile =

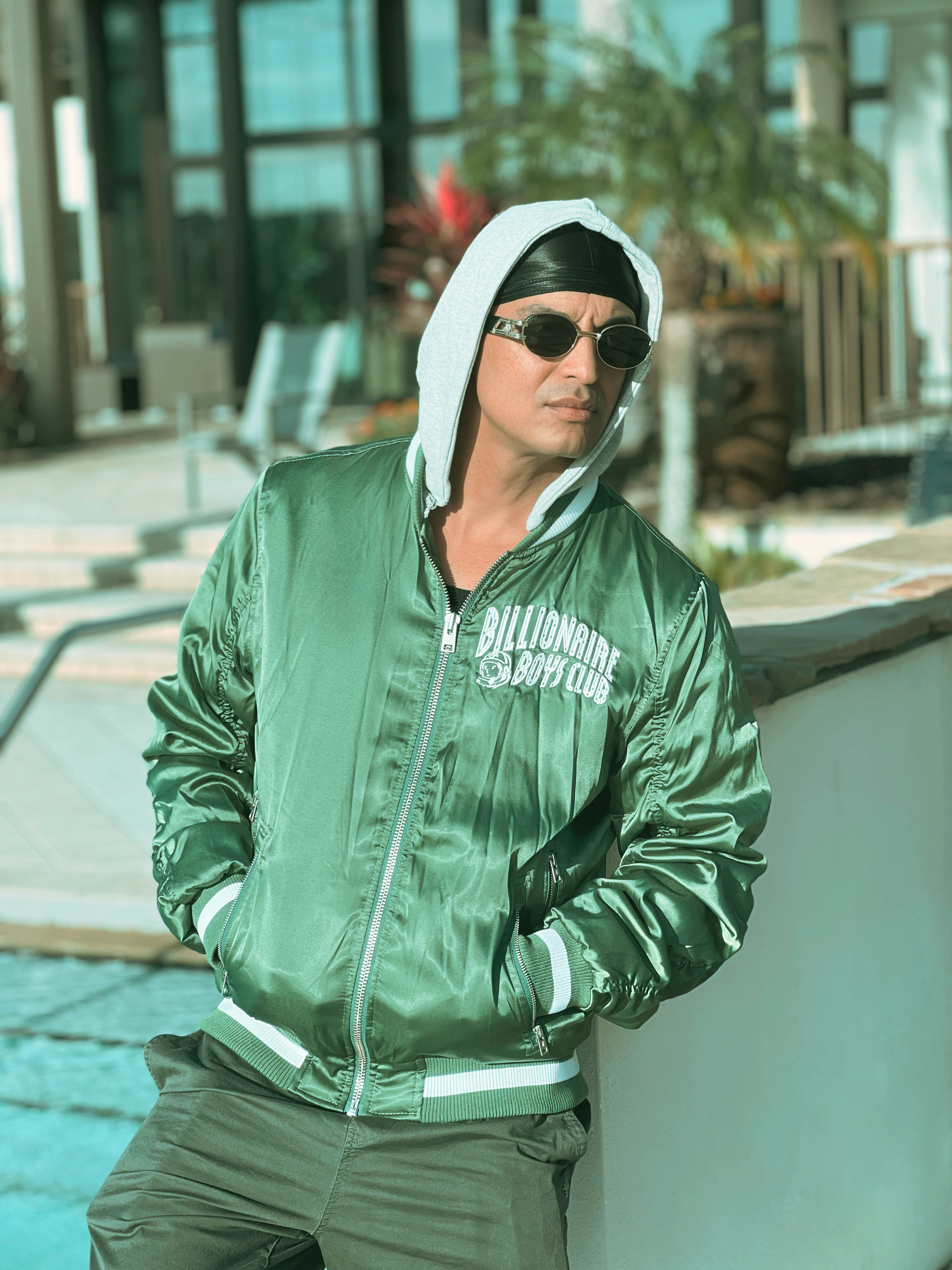

Background information
- Also known as: Raptile
- Born: Addis Mussa; 14 September 1976 (age 49); Munich, Germany
- Origin: Orlando, Florida, U.S.
- Genres: Hip hop; pop; Power pop
- Occupations: Singer; rapper; producer; songwriter
- Years active: 1998–present
- Labels: Monstablokaz LLC; Sony Music
- Website: raptile.music

Raptile (born Addis Mussa) began his career collaborating with American artists including Xzibit, Strong Arm Steady, and Trey Songz, and was signed to Sony Music in Europe. His releases have sold over 500,000 units worldwide.

In 2004, he released the album Classic Material, which reached number 8 on the German Media Control Charts, followed by the albums Mozez and Hero Muzik. In 2007, he released Global Takeover, a compilation project highlighting tracks from his earlier works.[1][2] His international success continued with the single “My Everything,” featuring Jamaican reggae artist Wayne Wonder.[3][4]

That same year, Raptile relocated to Orlando, Florida, where he began developing new material. His song “Neva Eva” was featured in the EA Sports video game NBA Live 07.[5]

Between 2012 and 2016, Raptile performed with his female rap partner Lionezz under the urban-pop group name Follow Your Instinct. The group collaborated with artists such as Busta Rhymes and Snoop Dogg and toured internationally, including across Asia. Lionezz also appeared on VH1's ego trip’s Miss Rap Supreme in 2008.[6]

From 2018 to 2025, Raptile worked as an A&R consultant for Sony Music Entertainment. He is currently producing his anniversary album Classic Material 2, scheduled for release in mid-to-late 2026.[7]

== Discography ==
=== Albums ===
List of albums, with selected chart positions and certifications, showing year released and album name
Title	Year	Peak chart positions		
Title	Year	US	US R&B	GER
Da Basilisk's Eye (with Roger Rekless)	2001	—	—	—
Classic Material	2004	—	—	8
Mozez (also available as limited edition)	2005	—	—	36
Hero Muzik	2006	—	—	—
Best of - Europe's Golden Child (Best-of CD)	2006	—	—	—
Global Takeover, Pt. 1	2007	—	—	—
Global Takeover, Pt. 2	2007	—	—	—
Global Takeover, Pt. 3	2007	—	—	—
Global Takeover, Pt. 4	2007	—	—	—
Animal Kingdom (with Follow Your Instinct (FYI))	2015	—	—	—
"—" denotes a recording that did not chart or was not released in that territory.

=== Singles ===
List of singles, with selected chart positions and certifications, showing year released and album name
Title	Year	Peak chart positions					Album
Title	Year	US	US R&B	GER	AUT	SWI	Album
"Microphone Igniter / We Don't Need U" (with Roger Rekless)	2001	—	—	—	—	—	Da Basilisk's Eye
"Rest Ya Head on My Chest" (with Roger Rekless)	2001	—	—	—	—	—	Da Basilisk's Eye
"Make Y'All Bounce" (featuring Xzibit) (Strong Arm Steady Version)	2004	—	—	24	—	—	Classic Material
"Da Unbeatables" (featuring Valezka)	2004	—	—	14	—	—	Classic Material
"My Everything" (featuring Wayne Wonder)	2004	—	—	64	—	—	Classic Material
"Fight Back"	2005	—	—	10	37	—	Mozez
"Da Symphony (Olé Olé)"	2005	—	—	26	—	—	Mozez
"Go Faster"	2006	—	—	27	—	—	Hero Muzik
"NevaEva"	2006	—	—	32	—	—	Hero Muzik
"Missin' Ur Kisses" (featuring Trey Songz)	2006	—	—	87	—	—	Hero Muzik
Changed his name to "Addis" & also formed a new European-American supergroup called "Follow Your Instinct"
"Stay Strong"	2010	—	—	—	—	—	Non-album single
"Disco" (Addis featuring Follow Your Instinct)	2010	-	-	—	—	—	Animal Kingdom
"Murderer" (featuring Viper)	2011	—	—	—	—	—	Non-album single
"On the Floor" (Follow Your Instinct)	2012	—	—	—	—	—	Animal Kingdom
"No Matter What They Say" (Follow Your Instinct featuring Samu Haber of Sunrise Avenue)	2012	—	—	54	68	—	Animal Kingdom
"My City" (Follow Your Instinct)	2013	—	—	24	—	—	Animal Kingdom
"Baby It's OK" (Follow Your Instinct featuring Alexandra Stan)	2013	—	—	17	31	44	Animal Kingdom
"—" denotes a recording that did not chart or was not released in that territory.
