= Adi Unaisi Biau =

Rugby union career
Senior career
| Years | Team | Apps | (Points) |
| 2022 | Fijiana Drua | 2 | (0) |
International career
| Years | Team | Apps | (Points) |
| 2022 | Fiji | 1 | (0) |

Adi Unaisi Biau is a Fijian rugby union player.

== Career ==
Biau was not initially named in the Fijiana Drua squad for the 2022 Super W season. She made her Super W debut against the Waratahs in round five. She was then named in the starting lineup for the final round match against the Brumbies.

In May 2022, Biau was selected for the national team for two test matches against Australia and Japan. She was named as a reserve in the test against Japan and made her international debut for Fiji.
