= Kamala Narayana Temple =

Hindu temple from Kadamba dynasty

Coordinates: 15.570586°N 74.752414°E

Kamala Narayana Temple

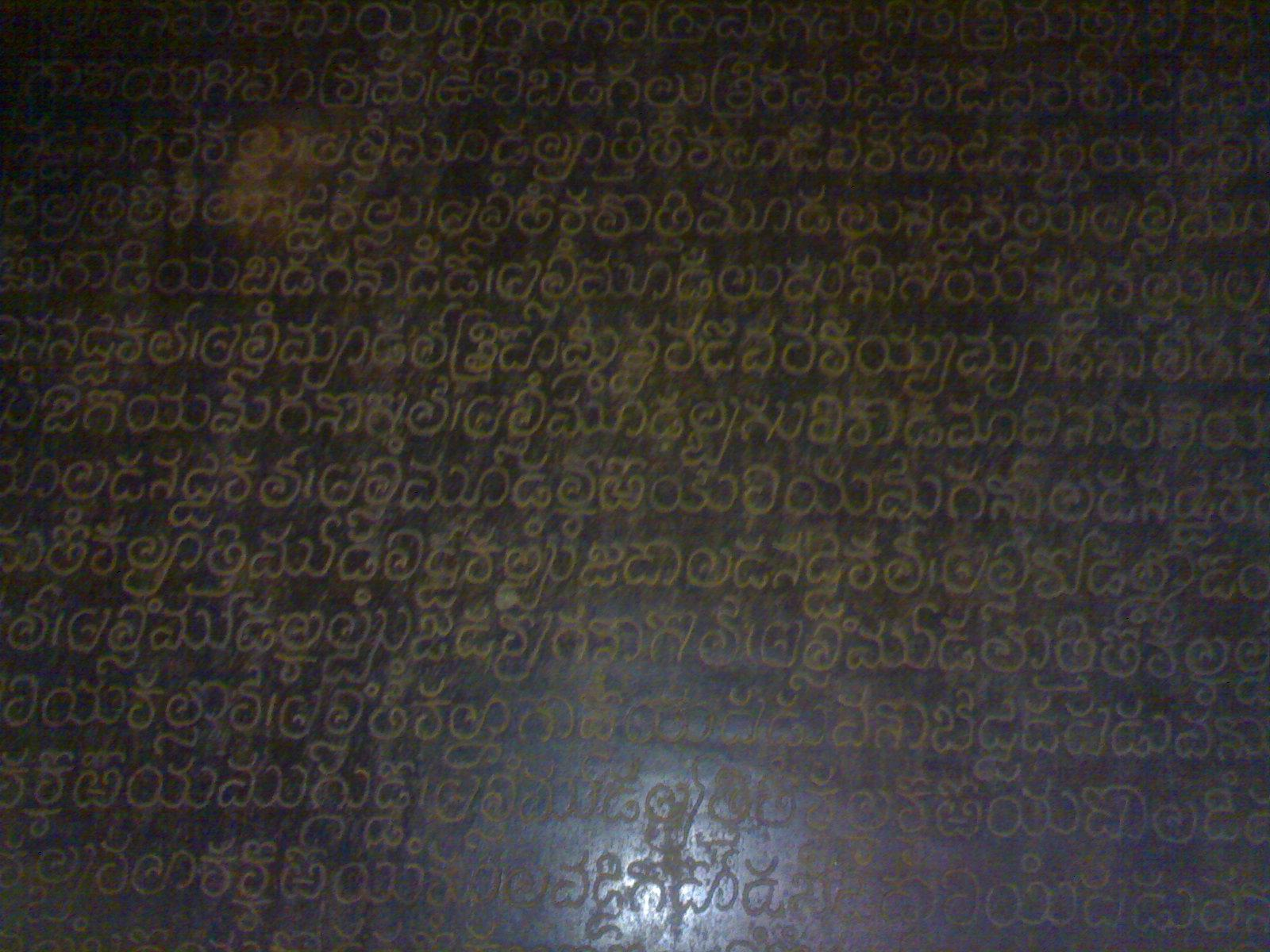
Kadamba Kannada inscription at Kamala Narayana Temple.

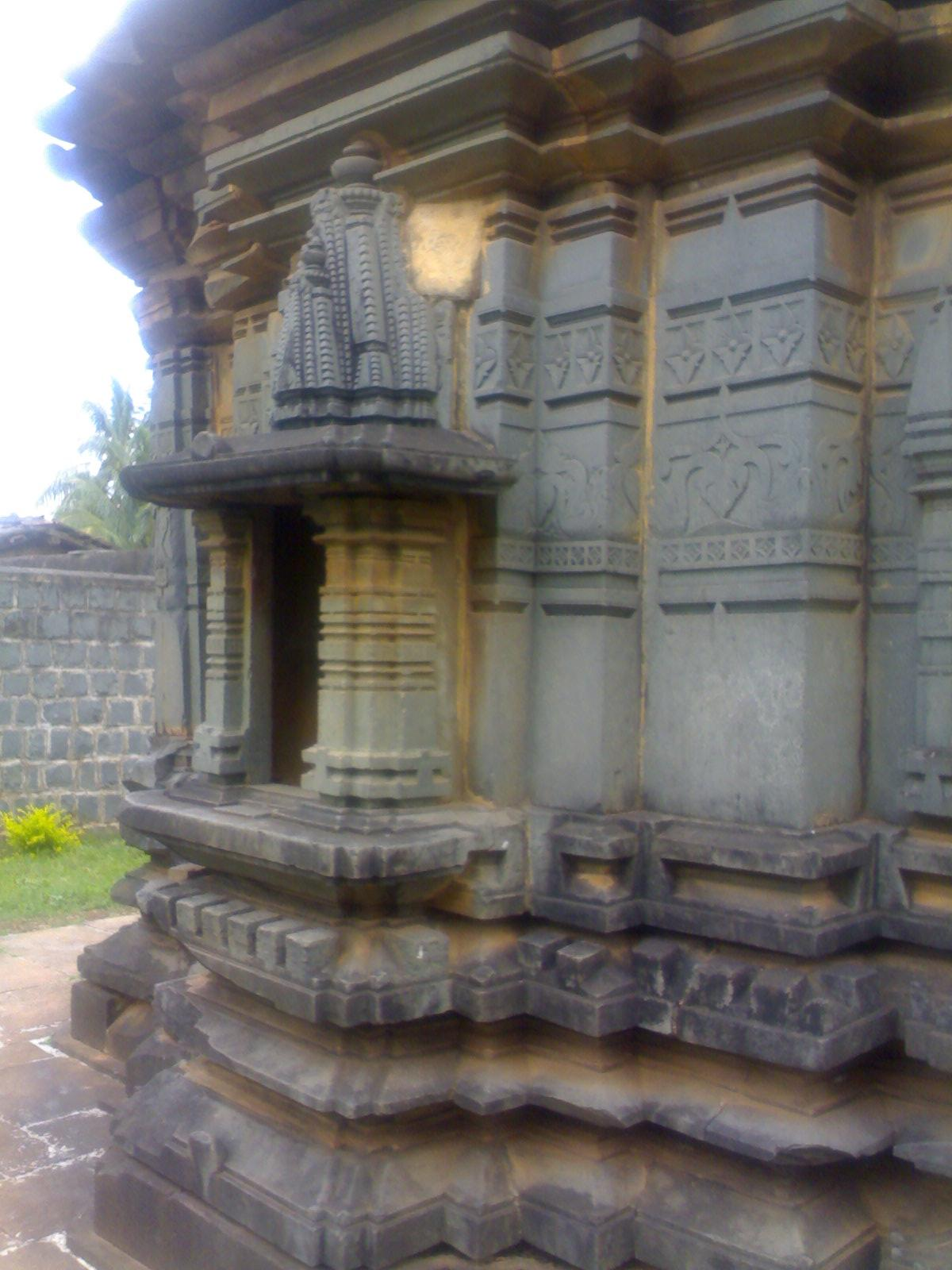
Kamala Narayana Temple, Degaon near Kittur, Karnataka.

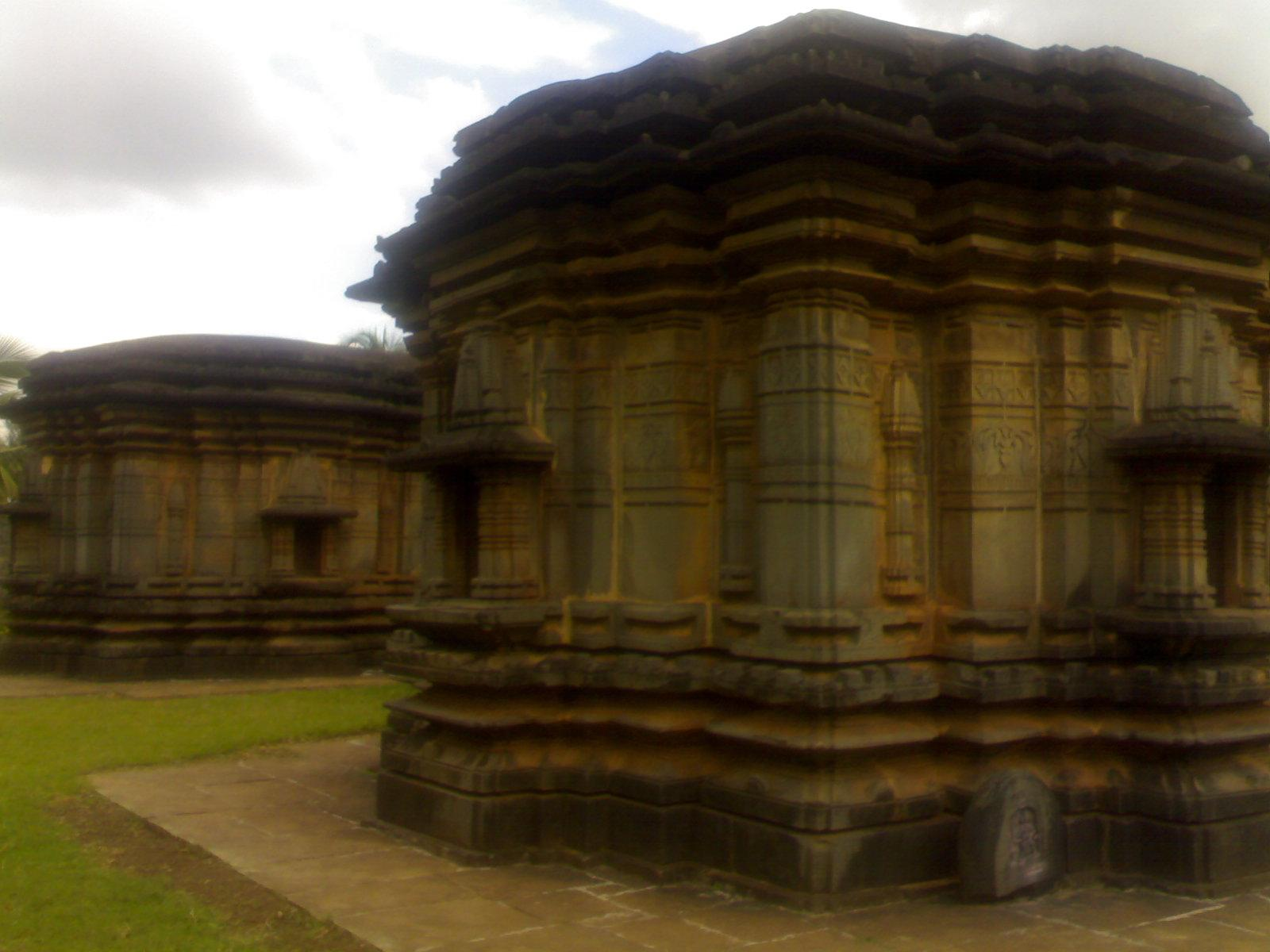
Kamala Narayana Temple, Degaon, Karnataka.

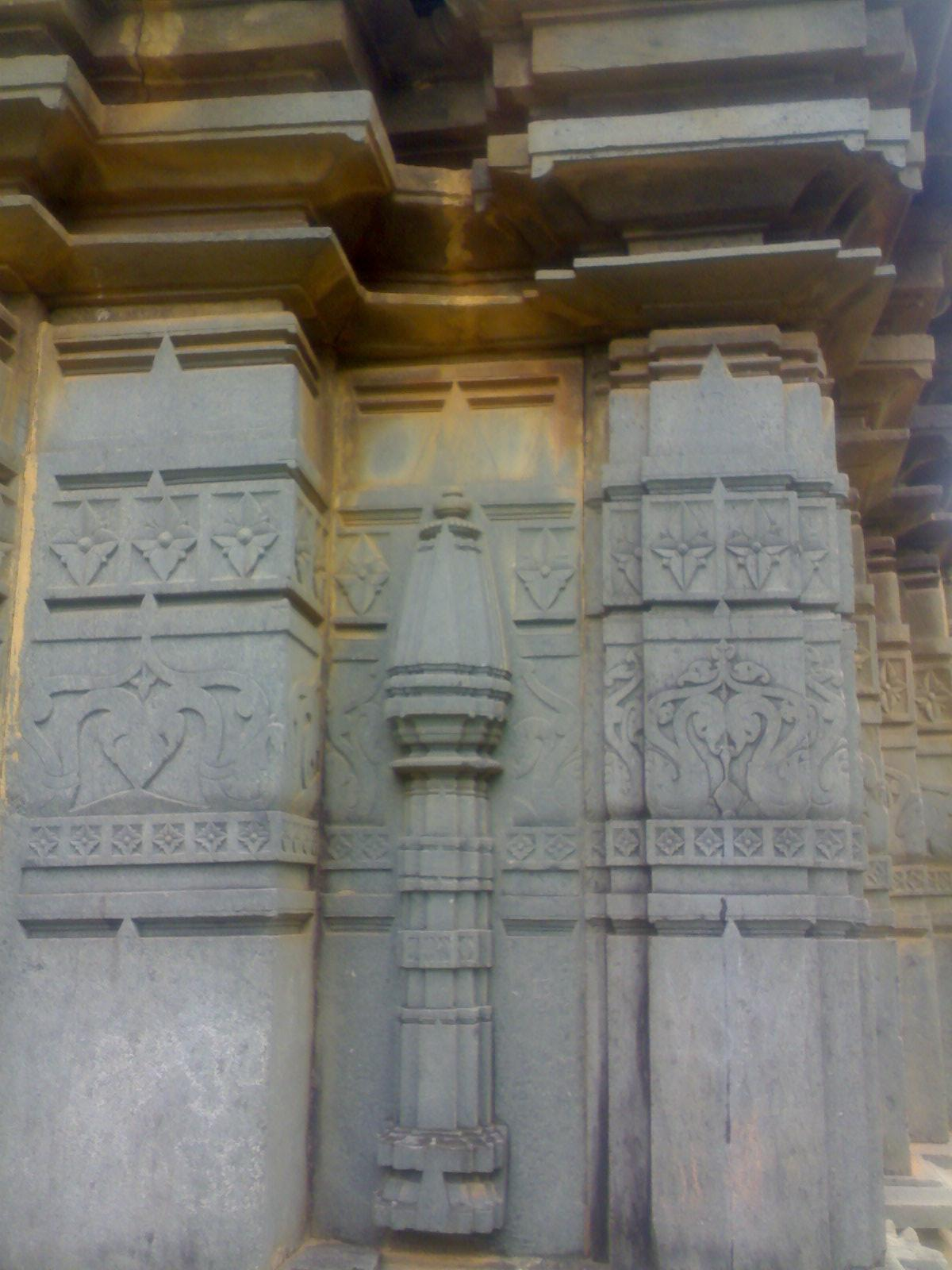
Kamala Narayana Temple, near Kittur, Karnataka.

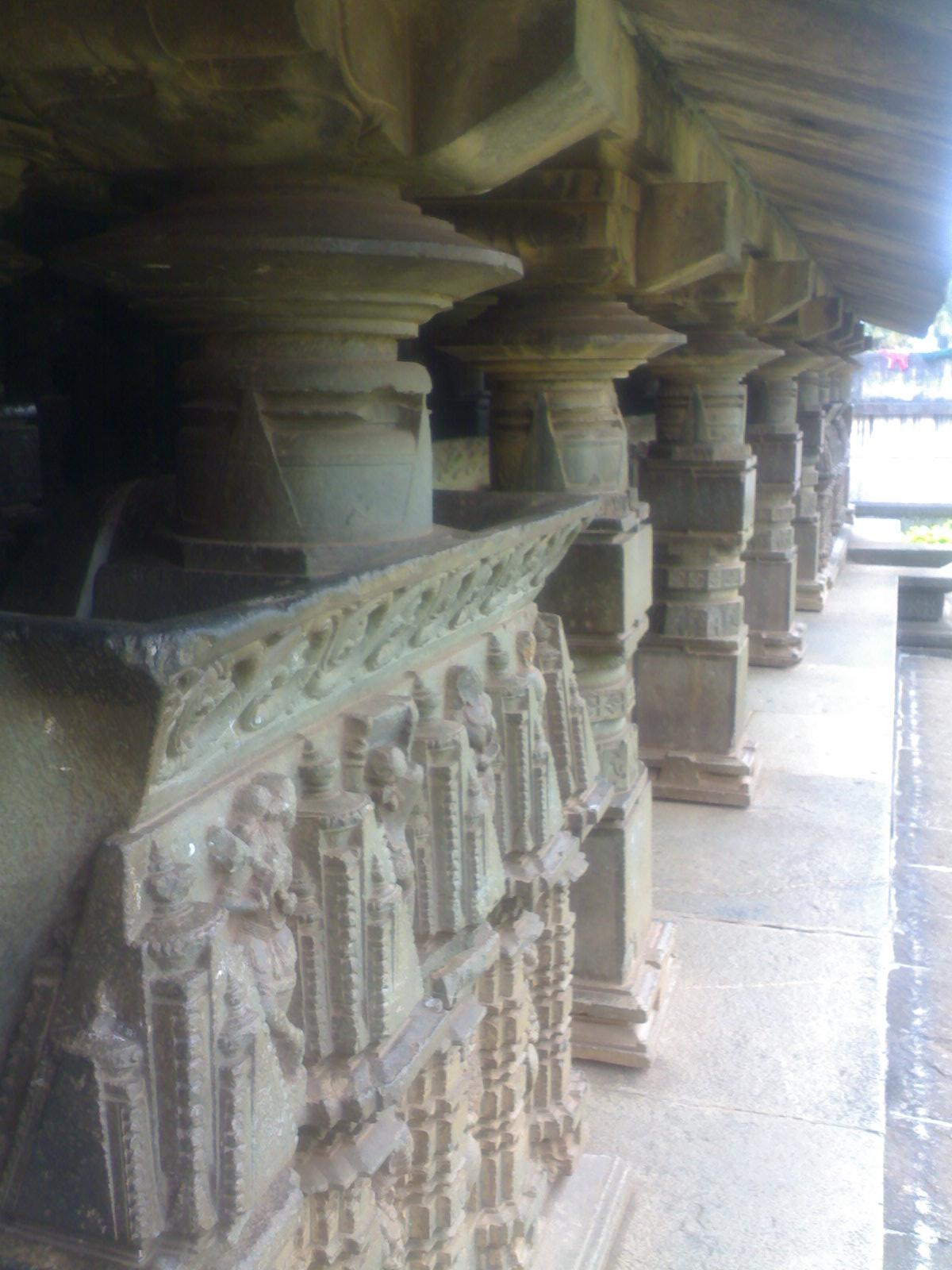
Degaon near Kittur, Karnataka.

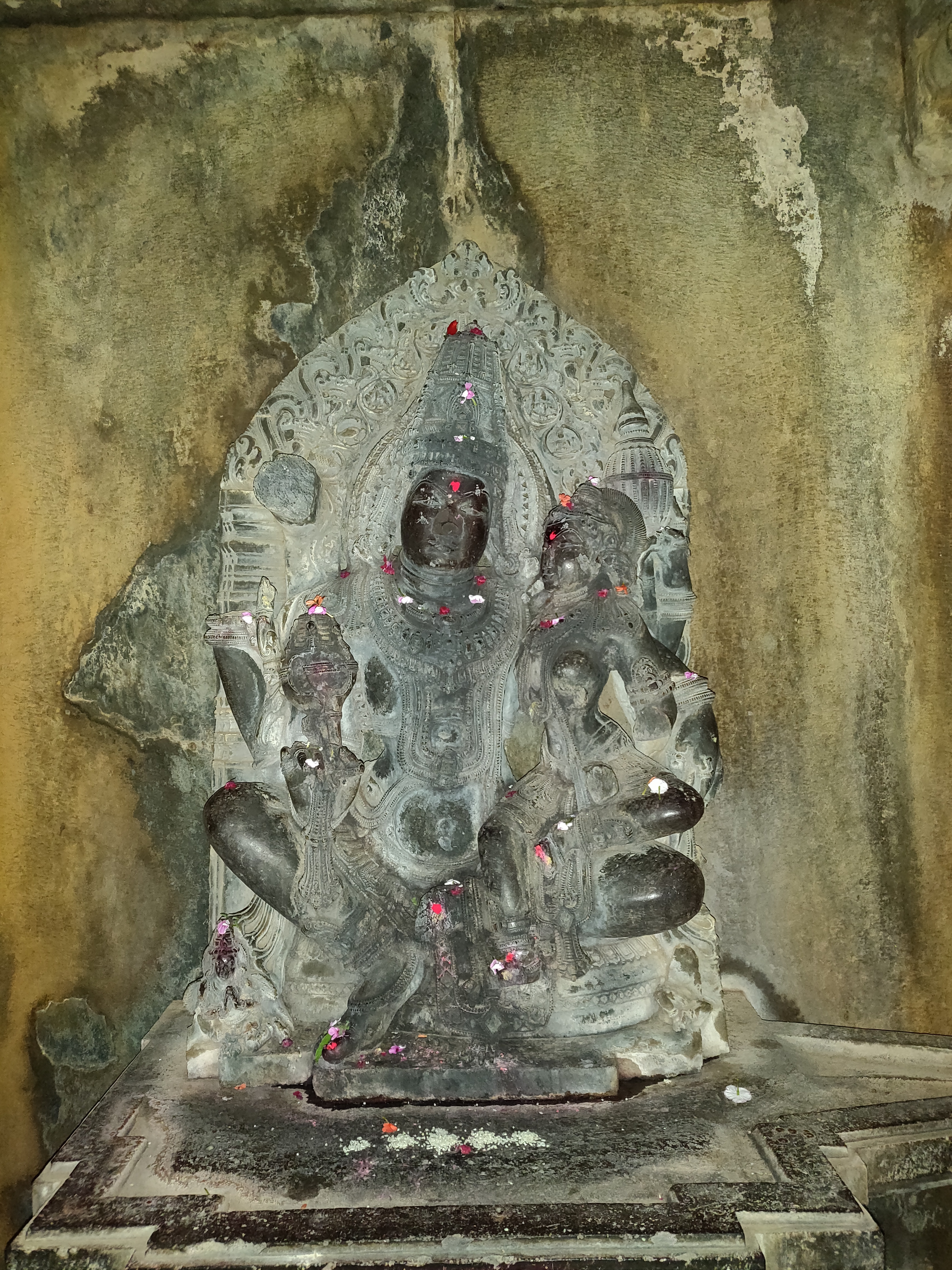
Lakshmi Narayana, with the Goddess Lakshmi Seated on Lord Vishnu’s lap.

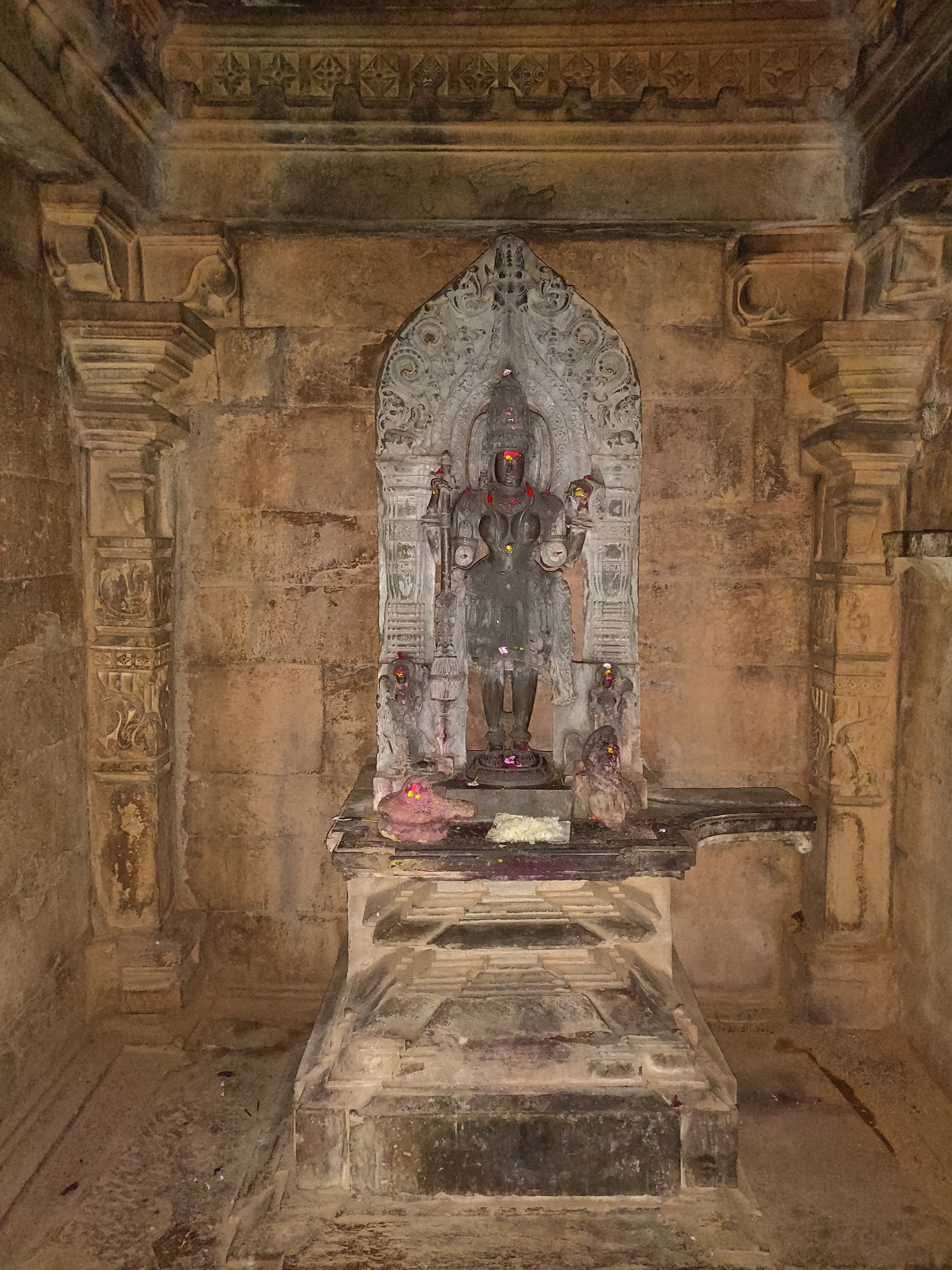
Queen Kamaladevi, with her attendants.

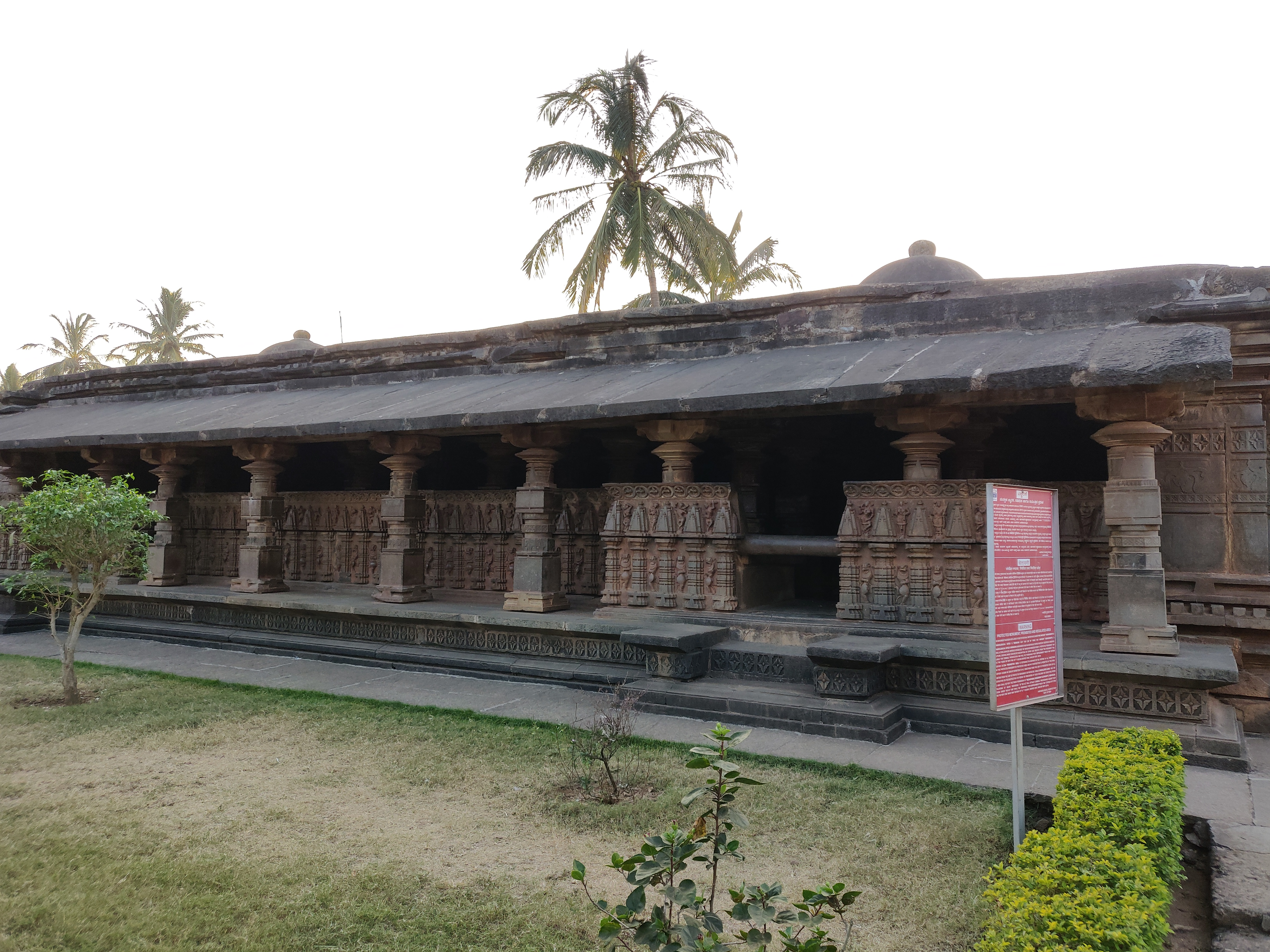
Front view.

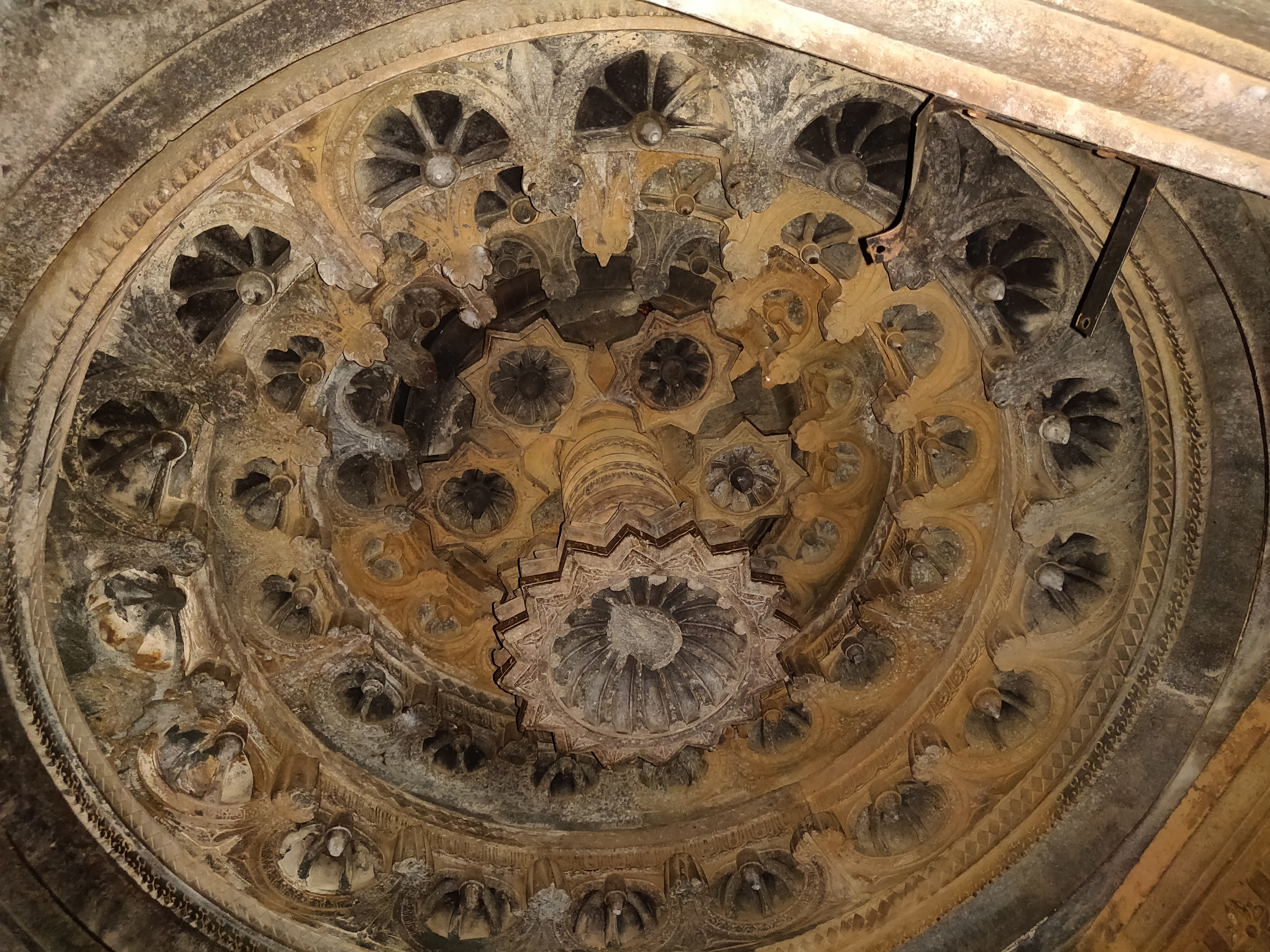
exquisitely carved gigantic lotus in an inverted form.

Kamala Narayana Temple is at Degaon in Belgaum District, Karnataka, India. The temple was built by the Kadamba dynasty. Kamal Narayan Temple was constructed by Tippoja, the chief architect of Kamala Devi, the Queen of the Kadamba king Sivachitta Permadi in the 12th century. This temple built in 1174. A.D. The principal deity is Lord Narayana.

== Architecture ==
It contains sculptures, including lions and floral motifs. The temple has three cells and hence comes under the classification of Trikutachal temples. There are three shrines here. The first shrine has a statue of Narayana. The second has a statue of Lakshmi Narayana, with the Goddess Lakshmi seated on the lap. The third shrine has a statue of queen Kamala Devi, with her attendants on either sides. The interior roof of the temple has an exquisitely carved gigantic lotus in an inverted form. The temple roof stands on a colonnade of pillars with rich carvings. Pillars with roaring lions between them pyramidal towers surrounding these pillars and having girls in poses between them and beautiful scroll work on top. The stone panels along the facade of the temple have emblems of the Kadamba dynasty and other figures.
