= Joseph Ady =

English criminal (c. 1770 – 1852)

Joseph Ady or Adey (c. 1770–1852) was an English impostor.

He was at one time a hatter in London, but failing in that business he hit upon the device of raising funds by means of circular letters, promising, on the receipt of a suitable fee, to inform those whom he addressed of ‘something to their advantage.’ In numerous instances he evaded the law and baffled the magistrates and Post Office authorities.

For some months prior to his death in 1852, he was removed from prison to his brother's residence in Fenchurch Street, in consequence of a rapid decline of health, a memorial to that effect having been presented to the home secretary.
