= Adi Stenroth =

Finnish officer in the French Foreign Legion

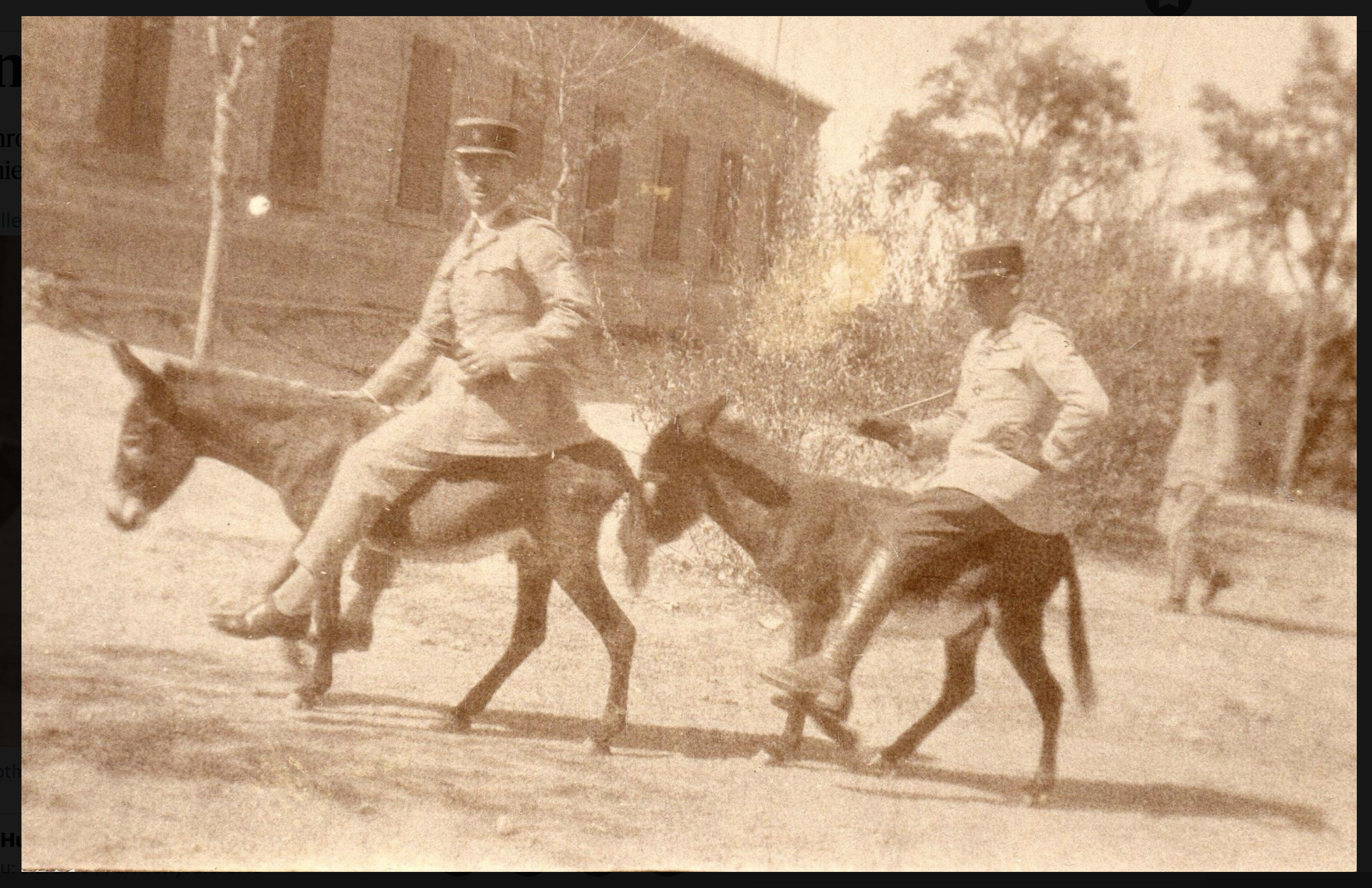
Adi Stenroth riding a donkey (left)

Adlay Gideon "Adi" Stenroth (1896 – 23 May 1931, Hanoi, French Indochina) was a Finnish officer in the French Foreign Legion. He was likely the only Finn who ever became an officer in the Legion.

== Biography ==
Stenroth’s father worked for the Finnish railways as the head of the Värtsilä station. Stenroth took his matriculation exams in the Nurmes mixed secondary school in 1915. Stenroth knew many languages. The Swedish language appears to have been his native language, in addition to which he naturally knew Finnish, as well as German and Russian. He started his studies in the Helsinki Business School, but they were cut short by the Finnish Civil War. In the war, he fought in the Helsinki Jaeger Brigade, e.g. in the Battle of Helsinki. Having participated in the war, he was now attracted to a military career, and he was accepted into the Artillery School in Lappeenranta. There he studied with e.g. future General Lieutenant A. F. Airo.

After the Artillery School, Stenroth served in the Field Artillery Regiment 2, until he unexpectedly resigned in February 1920, possibly because some financial affairs that had gone awry. His career as an officer had just started off well, and he was described as a “complete balking foal, in the right sense of the word.” He left for France, wherein April 1920, he joined the Foreign Legion in Arras, with a contract for five years, beginning his service in the rank of a private. The first years he served as an NCO responsible for combat materials, until he participated in a course for future officers in 1924, completing it as the top of the course, his score has been 18/20. He has been promoted a sublieutenant in July of the same year. It seems likely he knew French well at that point, as officers had to have an excellent command of the language.

During 1925–26 Stenroth participated in the Rif War in North Africa, where he fought against e.g. the Berber troops of the charismatic Moroccan Abd el-Krim. According to Stenroth, the Berbers were “unbelievably brave and had a contempt for death”. At one point, it was already thought that Stenroth had died, but he managed to escape from the Berbers. The site of one battle was named Fort Stenroth in his honor. For his exploits in the war, he was awarded the Croix de Guerre, and he was promoted a lieutenant and mentioned in a dispatch, which is considered to be a special honor in France. He

has, through his personal qualities, become a splendid leader for his men — he always volunteers for dangerous missions … On July 3rd, he led his men in a brilliant manner, showing them a most perfect example of indifference in the face of danger.

During 1928–30 Stenroth served in Libya and Syria. In October 1930, he was sent to Hải Phòng in French Indochina, where he arrived in April 1931, in order to restrain local troubles. However, he fell ill with a tropical disease immediately after arrival and was transferred to a hospital in Hanoi, where he died on 23 May.
