= Australian Doctors International =

- Formation: 2000
- Founder: Dr Peter Macdonald
- Region served: Papua New Guinea
- Website: www.adi.org.au

Founded in 2000, ADI's goal is to improve the health of people in remote and rural areas of Papua New Guinea (PNG). ADI specialises in Doctor Supervised Integrated Health Patrols, deploying volunteer doctors and health managers to work in partnership with local health providers to provide medical treatment to save lives and reduce suffering, community health education to reduce preventable illness and disease, and training to build the capacity of local health workers.

It was founded in 2000 by former Manly Mayor, politician and general practitioner, Dr Peter Macdonald. The organisation first started working in Western Province in partnership with the Catholic Diocese of Daru-Kiunga to help support their rural health network and services. In 2011 ADI expanded its program to remote and rural areas of New Ireland Province in partnership with the Provincial Government.

Its key achievements include:

- Deployed more than 30 volunteer doctors on over 38 assignments;
- Distributed 50,000+ malaria bed nets to remote villages in Western Province
- Ran a six-year Mass Drug Administration program to eliminate lymphatic filariasis in the Nomad-Mougulu region of Western Province
- Ran a HIV/AIDS awareness radio program
- Introduced a leprosy treatment, education and advocacy program for a community of over 30 leprosy patients in the Bosset region of Western Province,
- Started an annual in-service health training workshop for over 100 health workers in Western Province, a first for many participants.

As part of its Doctor Supervised Integrated Health Patrols, ADI’s volunteers travel by plane, boat and foot to remote and rural health centres, aid posts and hospitals to provide essential health care to people living in extreme poverty. Western Province, which is located on the border with West Papua, consists of raging rivers, steep mountain ranges up to 8,000m, vast floodplains and dense jungle. New Ireland Province, which is located off the mainland in the far northeast of PNG, consists of many isolated islands separated by rough seas. It can take weeks to complete a patrol in places such as the Star Mountains and Awaba River region in Western Province or Konoagil (otherwise known as The Last Corner by locals) in New Ireland Province.

ADI's services include:

1. Medical treatment: To help save lives and reduce suffering, ADI’s doctors currently treat more than 3,500 patients every year. Some people have never seen a doctor before, others only once every couple of years. Consequently, ADI's doctors see many people in advanced stages of disease that could have been prevented. Common diseases and illnesses include malaria and tuberculosis, leprosy, lymphatic filariasis, muscular skeletal, respiratory and serious eye problems.

2. Training and education: To help strengthen the capacity of local health workers, ADI’s doctors conduct case-based training during clinics and teach medical education sessions. Every year, ADI also facilitates an in-service health training which brings together health staff from various locations for a week of intensive learning with local and expatriate health experts.

3. School and community health education: Many lives are lost due to a lack of knowledge about how diseases are caused, prevented and treated. To help with this, ADI’s doctors and health managers deliver health education talks which address PNG national health priorities and target specific groups. In 2010-2011, ADI’s volunteers gave health talks to over 15,000 adults and school children in Western Province.

Where possible, ADI's doctors work alongside local health workers who perform parallel services including infant immunisations, eye/ear testing and dental. In New Ireland Province, ADI travels with a large team of provincial and district health staff who undertake community health promotion, health centre management and dental, disease control and environmental health activities.

Approved by AusAID as an OADGR, ADI is a member of ACFID and a signatory to its Code of Conduct. ADI aims for continuous improvement in health indicators as a result of its activities through the use of a structured monitoring and evaluation framework.

PNG has not shown any sustained improvement in health since 2002. It is unlikely to meet any of the UN Millennium Goals, especially those on child and maternal mortality. Rural areas - where 86% of the population lives - are particularly disadvantaged, with 30% of health aid posts closed. The rest are often run-down and under-resourced. Doctor shortage is a major problem. Western Province has just 14 doctors - all urban based - for 212,000 people spread far and wide. This includes one doctor per 8,800 people in North Fly District and no doctor for 74,800 in Middle Fly District. New Ireland Province has just 10 local doctors - all based at Kavieng Hospital - for 160,000 people. Due to heavy workloads and lack of funding, they rarely visit rural health centres and aid posts.

Forty percent of deaths in PNG are caused by six diseases that can be easily and inexpensively treated at aid posts. Diseases such as malaria, tuberculosis, pneumonia, diarrheal diseases, meningitis and HIV/AIDS account for about half of all deaths in PNG. Of every 1,000 children born, 69 will die before age five and another 53 won’t even survive their infancy. Five women die in childbirth every day and only two in five deliver at a health facility.

PNG also has: The highest rate of malaria in the Western Pacific, a leading cause of death in children under five in PNG; The highest rate of lymphatic filariasis (elephantiasis) in the world, with over 1 million people infected; The highest rate of HIV/AIDS in the Pacific region- an estimated 34,000 people are HIV-positive; The second highest incidence of leprosy in Western Province, despite the disease being treatable and virtually eradicated elsewhere in PNG; High incidence of intestinal diseases, such as cholera and typhoid, due to contaminated food and water; A worsening medical supply chain - only 50% of health centres/hospitals have adequate stocks of the most basic essential medicines.
