= Africa Development Indicators =

Compilation of data assembled by the World Bank

The World Bank Africa Development Indicators is a compilation of data, assembled by the World Bank, representing over 1,400 indicators of development in Sub-Saharan Africa.

== Methodology and scope ==
The information is updated annually from a variety of sources with datasets being available from 1960 onwards. Topics covered by the data include national accounts, balance of payments, trade, demography, health, education, transport, energy and the environment and the Millennium Development Goals. The World Bank aims at giving a broad picture of development across Africa, including 53 countries in five different country-groups.

While most of the data is provided by the World Bank, a large potion of it comes from different sources which is then put together under the World Bank Africa Development Indicators. With the contribution of organisation such as the International Monetary Fund (IMF), the Joint United Nations Programme on HIV/AIDS, the International Road Federation and the International Telecommunication Union, the World Resources Institute, the International Labour Organization, the Organisation for Economic Co-operation and Development, etc. it is possible to provide information on this high level of detail which is one of the key features of the data.

== Accessing the data ==
The Economic and Social Data Service International provides the macro-economic datasets free of charge for members of UK higher and further education institutions. In order to access the data, users have to be registered which can be done here. Alternatively, the data is available to download on the World Bank Africa Development Indicators website, which requires a subscription.

== See also ==
- ESDS International
