= Adisa Azapagic =

Chemical engineer

Adisa Azapagic MBE FREng FRSC FIChemE
- Born: Adisa Azapagić; 10 April 1961 (age 65); Tuzla, PR Bosnia and Herzegovina, FPR Yugoslavia
- Education: University of Tuzla; University of Surrey (PhD)
- Scientific career
- Fields: Sustainability; Life-cycle assessment Chemical engineering Corporate social responsibility
- Workplaces: University of Manchester; University of Surrey; University of Leeds
- Thesis: Environmental System Analysis: The Application of Linear Programming to Life Cycle Assessment
- Website: www.research.manchester.ac.uk/portal/adisa.azapagic.html

Adisa Azapagić (born 10 April 1961) is a Bosnian chemical engineer and academic. She has served as Professor of Sustainable Chemical Engineering at the University of Manchester since 2006.

== Early life and education ==
Azapagic was born in 1961 in Tuzla, Bosnia and Herzegovina. She attended the University of Tuzla, and graduated in 1984 with a bachelor's degree in chemical engineering. She completed her doctoral studies at the University of Surrey, and earned her PhD on Environmental System Analysis using Life-cycle assessment in 1996.

== Research and career ==
Azapagic remained at the University of Surrey for thirteen years before moving to the University of Manchester. She leads the Sustainable Industrial Systems research group at the University of Manchester. She runs several industry collaborations, including projects with Procter & Gamble, Kraft Foods, Whirlpool Corporation. In 2015 she won the University of Manchester award for Outstanding Benefit to Society. Azapagic developed software to calculate carbon footprint at the University of Manchester (CCaLC).

Her research interests lie in engineering for sustainable development, which includes sustainable technology, life cycle assessment and carbon footprinting. In 2018 she demonstrated that the UK's chocolate industry generates the same amount of greenhouse gases as Malta.

Azapagic is the founding editor-in-chief of Elsevier's Sustainable Production and Consumption. She has written three books, looking at sustainable development and polymers.

=== Awards and honours ===
Azapagic was elected a Fellow of the Royal Academy of Engineering (FREng) in 2013. She was appointed Member of the Order of the British Empire (MBE) in the 2020 New Year Honours for services to sustainability and carbon footprinting. She was awarded an honorary doctoral degree from Gheorghe Asachi Technical University of Iași. She is part of the all-party manufacturing group. She is a member of the American Institute of Chemical Engineers. In 2010 she was awarded the Institution of Chemical Engineers prize for Outstanding Achievements in Chemical and Process Engineering. She won the GlaxoSmithKline Innovation prize in 2011.
