= Adi Eko Jayanto =

Indonesian footballer

Personal information
- Full name: Adi Eko Jayanto
- Date of birth: 18 January 1994 (age 32)
- Place of birth: Kediri, Indonesia
- Height: 1.73 m (5 ft 8 in)
- Position: Midfielder

Team information
- Current team: Persik Kediri
- Number: 11

Youth career
- 2013–2016: Persedikab Kediri

Senior career*
Years	Team	Apps	(Gls)
2017–	Persik Kediri	147	(5)
2018	→ Persekat Tegal (loan)	10	(3)
- * Club domestic league appearances and goals as of 22 October 2026

Adi Eko Jayanto (born 18 January 1994) is an Indonesian professional footballer who plays as a midfielder for Super League club Persik Kediri.

== Club career ==
=== Persik Kediri ===
In 2017 Adi Eko Jayanto joined Persik Kediri in the Liga 2. On 25 November 2019 Persik successfully won the 2019 Liga 2 Final and promoted to Liga 1, after defeated Persita Tangerang 3–2 at the Kapten I Wayan Dipta Stadium, Gianyar.

==== Persekat Tegal (loan) ====
He was signed for Persekat Tegal to play in Liga 3 Regional route: Central Java in the 2018 season, on loan from Persik Kediri.

== Honours ==
=== Club ===
Persik Kediri

- Liga 2: 2019
- Liga 3: 2018
