= Adi Stern =

Israeli graphic designer (born 1966)

- עדי שטרן
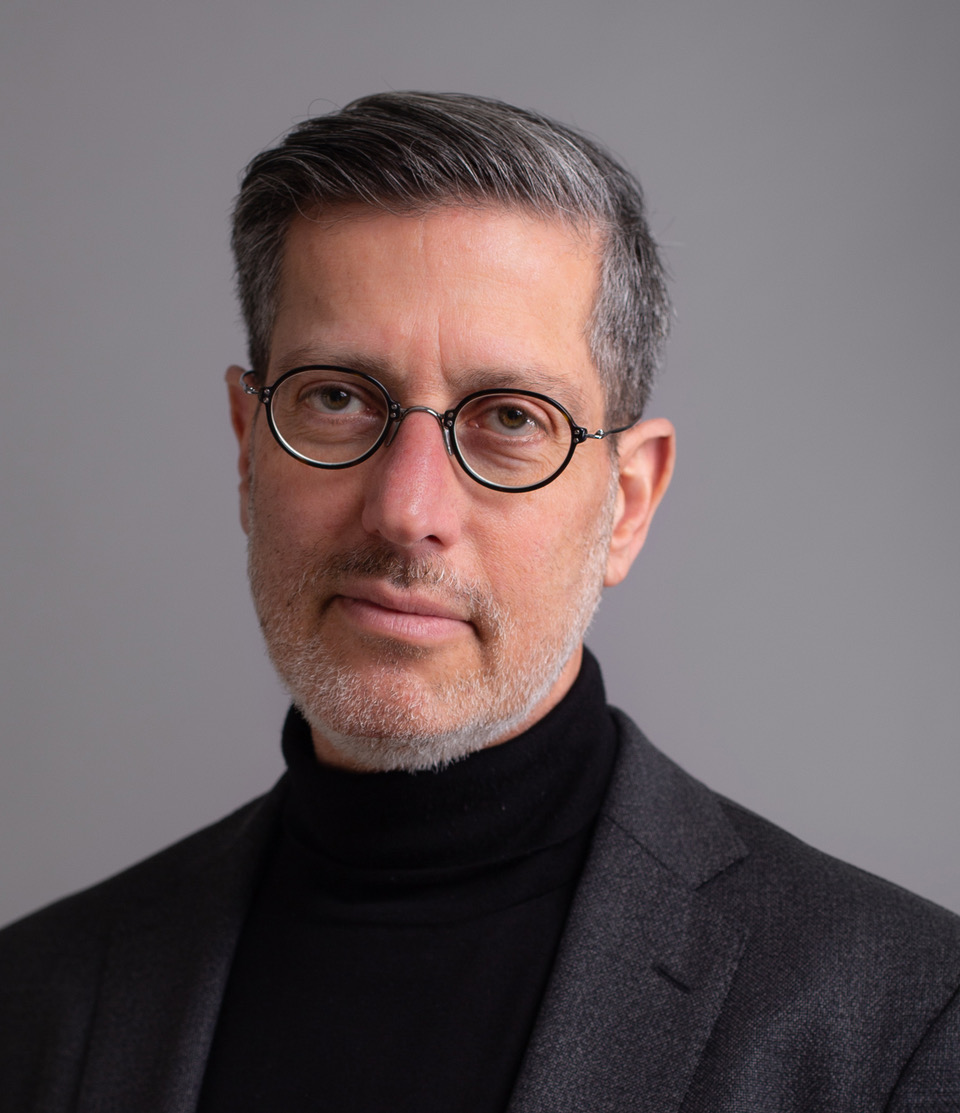
- Prof Adi Stern (2021)
- Born: 1966 (age 59–60)
- Known for: Graphic design

Adi Stern (Hebrew: עדי שטרן; born 1966) is an Israeli graphic designer, type designer, and the president of the Bezalel Academy of Arts and Design in Jerusalem.

== Biography ==
Adi Stern was born in 1966 in Tel Aviv-Yafo, Israel, and grew up in Bat Yam and Tel Aviv. From 1988-1992 he studied at Bezalel's Department of Graphic Design, and earned a bachelor's degree with distinction. After completing his studies at Bezalel, Stern worked for about two years at the studio of David Tartakover. Since 1994, he has run his own leading visual communication studio specializing in design for cultural institutions, as well as in book design and typography. His clients over the years have included the Design Museum Holon, the Tel Aviv Museum of Art, the Batsheva Dance Company, the Hebrew University, the Israel Festival, the Israeli Chamber Orchestra, the Interdisciplinary Center Herzliya, Keshet Broadcasting, the Israeli Opera, and Yad Vashem – The World Holocaust Remembrance Center. Stern designed the logos for the Interdisciplinary Center Herzliya, the Design Museum Holon, and the Israel Festival and was involved in the rebranding of Hebrew University.

From 2011–2013, Stern led the team conducting the visual communication design of a new permanent exhibition in the Jewish pavilion at former Nazi German Auschwitz concentration camp (now in Oświęcim, Poland). Stern designed the typographical layout of the pages in the “Book of Names” – an enormous monument that holds 14,000 pages and contains the names and available information of every known Holocaust victim. The book is set in the Noam Text font designed by Stern and published by TypeTogether, and its pages include the names of his grandparents – Hilkowicz Lucyna and Gustav.

From 2002–2003, Stern studied at the Department of Typography and Graphic Communication at Reading University in the UK and earned his master's in Typeface Design, with distinction. His typographical work draws from the heritage and history of Hebrew script and presents new and contemporary approaches and solutions on both the aesthetic and functional levels. In addition to his work as a designer, Stern also writes and lectures on the history and design of the Hebrew script. Stern has worked as a consultant for some of the most prominent companies in the field of type design, including Linotype, Microsoft Typography, and Monotype.

Since 1997, Stern has worked as a lecturer at Bezalel, teaching various graphic design and typography courses. He has educated generations of young designers including some of today's most prominent professionals in the field, both in Israel and around the world. From 2008–2015, he served as the head of Bezalel's Department of Visual Communication. Under his leadership, Bezalel established the first master's degree program in the field of Visual Communication in Israel. From March to September 2015, Stern served as the interim President of Bezalel, and he has held the position of President of the Academy since October 2015.

Founded in 1906, Bezalel is well known as Israel's largest, oldest, and most influential institution of art and design. The art created by Bezalel's students and professors in the early 1900s is widely considered to have been the springboard for Israeli visual arts in the 20th century.

Among his responsibilities as Bezalel's president, Stern is raising the necessary funds for the establishment of the new Jack, Joseph and Morton Mandel Bezalel Campus in Jerusalem's city center. The campus building, which is being planned by the architecture firm SANAA in Tokyo, is expected to become a primary anchor driving the urban renewal of downtown Jerusalem.

Adi Stern lives in Tel Aviv with his wife and two daughters.

== Awards and recognition ==
- His works were featured in many exhibitions in Israel and around the world, winning various awards including first prize from the Typographic Designers Association of Tokyo, Japan (TDC Tokyo) and Silver and Bronze awards from the Art Directors Club (ADC), New York.
- In 2013 he was chosen by Haaretz newspaper as one of the top ten most influential people in Israeli design
- The Art Directors Club, ADC Silver and Bronze Awards, New York, USA, 2011
- ISTD, the International Society of Typographic Designers, UK, 2004, 2011
- D&AD (Design & Art Direction), In-book Excellence Award, London, UK, 2011
- Society of Environmental Graphic Design, Merit Award], USA, 2011
- Tokyo Type Directors Club Annual, First Prize, The TDC AWARD, Japan, 2010.
- Tokyo Type Directors Club Annual, 'Excellent Work' Award, Japan, 2008, 2007, 2005
- Award for Excellence in Type Design, The Type Directors Club, New York, USA, 2004
- Chosen Artist of the Israel Cultural Excellence Foundation (2002)
- Typographic Excellence Award, The Type Directors Club, New York, USA, 2001
- Ministry of Culture, Science and Sports Award in the field of Graphic Design (1999)
- Scholarship for Academic Excellence from the America-Israel Cultural Foundation (Sharett Foundation) (1992, 1993, 1995)
