= Adhi, Jalandhar =

Adhi
- Village
- Location in Punjab, India
- Coordinates: 31.2363065°N 75.3865917°E
- Country: India
- State: Punjab
- District: Jalandhar

Languages
  - Official: Punjabi
- Time zone: UTC+5:30 (IST)

Adhi, Aadhi or Addi, is a village in the tehsil of Nakodar, in Jalandhar district, Punjab, India.

It is located 18 km from Nakodar, 21 km from Kapurthala, 24.8 km from district headquarter Jalandhar and 163 km from state capital Chandigarh. The village is administrated by a sarpanch.

== Transport ==
Pajian railway station is the nearest train station however, Jalandhar city train station is 26.4 km away from the village. The village is 80 km away from domestic airport in Ludhiana and the nearest international airport is located in Chandigarh also Sri Guru Ram Dass Jee International Airport is the second nearest airport which is 97 km away in Amritsar.
