= ESDS International =

ESDS International was a Jisc/ESRC funded service which provided the UK academic community with free online access to the major databanks produced by international governmental organisations such as the World Bank, International Monetary Fund and the United Nations. The service also supported the use of these databanks in teaching and research through the provision of a helpdesk for user queries, comprehensive documentation and training.

ESDS International also provided access to a range of international survey datasets including the European Social Survey and Eurobarometer.

The service aimed to promote and facilitate increased and more effective use of international datasets in research, learning and teaching across a range of disciplines.

Databases hosted by ESDS International included the major statistical publications of:

- International Monetary Fund
- World Bank
- International Energy Agency
- OECD
- United Nations
- Eurostat
- International Labour Organization
- UK Office for National Statistics

In July 2012, the Economic and Social Research Council (ESRC) announced that all of ESDS would become part of the UK Data Service, which was established as of October 1, 2012 - see http://www.esrc.ac.uk/research/our-research/uk-data-service/.
