= Khanapur =

- Town
- Khanapura
- Location in Karnataka, India Khanapur (India)
- Coordinates: 15°38′22″N 74°30′30″E
- Country: India
- State: Karnataka
- District: Belagavi

Government
  - Body: Town Panchayat
- Elevation: 649 m (2,129 ft)

Population (2011)
  - Total: 345,839

Languages
  - Official: Kannada
- Time zone: UTC+5:30 (IST)
- PIN: 591302
- Telephone code: 08336
- ISO 3166 code: IN-KA
- Vehicle registration: KA-22
- Website: khanapurtown.mrc.gov.in/en/

Khanapur known as Khanapura (IPA: [kʰaːnaːpuɾɐ]) is a panchayat town in Belagavi district, Karnataka, India. It is about 26 km from Belagavi, the administrative capital of the district. The Khanapur Municipal Council governs the town. Khanapur is the headquarters for Khanapur taluk. Khanapur is the birthplace of Abdul Karim Telgi.

== Geography ==
Khanapur has an elevation of 646 metres (2,119 ft).

== Demographics ==
In the 2001 census, the town of Khanapur had 16,567 inhabitants, with 8,474 males (51.1%) and 8,093 females (48.9%), for a gender ratio of 955 females per thousand males.

In the 2011 census, the town of Khanapur had 18,535 inhabitants.

== Transportation ==
The town is on the Belgaum-Panaji National Highway, NH 4A. Khanapur is well connected by train through Khanapur railway station and road to important cities in Karnataka, Goa, and Maharashtra.

=== Languages ===
Languages of Khanapur town (2011)
1. Marathi (42.2%)
2. Kannada (25.6%)
3. Urdu (23.4%)
4. Hindi (3.46%)
5. Konkani (3.42%)
6. Others (1.94%)
Languages of Khanapur Taluk (2011)
1. Marathi (51.9%)
2. Kannada (36.4%)
3. Urdu (8.60%)
4. Konkani (1.62%)
5. Others (1.47%)

At the time of the 2011 Census of India, 42.17% of the population in the city spoke Marathi, 25.62% Kannada, 23.39% Urdu, 3.46% Hindi and 3.42% Konkani as their first language.

== Tourism, attractions, and economy ==
Khanapur's economy is agriculture-based and is noted for its cultivation of crops such as sugarcane, rice, Ragi (millet), and fruits including chikoo, guava, and jackfruit, Cashew. It is also famous for food items such as churmure (puffed rice) and jaggery.

Khanapur is famous for its national level pottery training centre, the Central Village Pottery Institute, which is run by khadi and a village industries commission on the banks of the Malaprabha River, where excellent pottery training is given in Redware and Whiteware technology. Also, a tourist spot in Khanapur is Chouda Musi, a small British era bridge constructed over a small dam. There is Police training school at Khanapura on the northern banks of river Malaprabha run by Karnataka state government. This Police training school imparts basic training to new recruits appointed as police constables in Karnataka state police.

Other Attractions in and around Khanapur

- Kadamba period Bhuvaraha Narasimha temple at Halasi
- Kadamba style Kamala Narayana Temple is at Degaon
- Asoga - A village named Asoga on the banks of Malaprabha river is very attractive tourist place famous for its temple. This temple was built during the reign of Kadamba kings in the medieval period. Important scenes from the 1970s hit movie 'Abhimaan' (featuring Amithabh Bacchan and Jaya bhaduri) were shot near the river Malaprabha at Asoga. The entire song 'Nadiya kinare' has been shot there.
- Modekopon the banks of Malaprabha river is very attractive tourist
- Bhimgad Wildlife Sanctuary
- Gadikopp Shree guru Raghavendra Swami Matha

== See also ==
- Adi (Khanapur)
- The Kalasa-Banduri Nala project
- Halasi
- Kadegaon
- Kittur
- Kamala Narayana Temple
- Degaon
- Sangolli Rayanna
- Modekop
- Jatage
