= List of Vijayanagara era temples in Karnataka =

The List of Vijayanagara era temples in Karnataka includes notable and historically important Hindu and Jain temples and monoliths that were built or received significant patronage by the kings and vassals of the Vijayanagara Empire during the period 1336-1646 AD. This period includes the rule of the four dynasties: the Sangama, the Saluva, the Tuluva, and the Aravidu dynasties.

Common name	Photo	Location	District	Year	Notes
Someshwara		Kolar city	Kolar	Early 14th century	According to the Archaeological Survey of India the temple is assignable to the early Vijayanagara period
Vidyashankara		Sringeri	Chikkamagaluru	16th century	According to art historian George Michell, the unusual stellate appearance of the temple is due to the influence of Hoysala architecture.
Shiva		Hemakuta hill, Hampi	Vijayanagara	Early 14th century	Hemakuta group of temples, UNESCO World Heritage Site
Shiva		Hemakuta hill, Hampi	Vijayanagara	14th century	Hemakuta group of temples, UNESCO World Heritage Site
Shiva		Hemakuta hill, Hampi	Vijayanagara	14th century	Hemakuta group of temples
Shiva		Hemakuta hill, Hampi	Vijayanagara	14th century	Hemakuta group of temples, UNESCO World Heritage Site
Shiva		Hemakuta hill, Hampi	Vijayanagara	14th century	Hemakuta group of temples
Ganagitti (Jain)		Hampi	Vijayanagara	c.1385	An inscription on the site states that the temple was built in A.D. 1385 by lruga, in the reign of King Harihara II, UNESCO World Heritage Site
Saavira Kambada Basadi		Mudabidri	Udupi	c.1429–1430	Known locally as the 1000-pillared temple
Cheluvanarayana Swamy		Melkote	Mandya	c.1458	Also known as Cheluva Narayana temple, it was built by the local Vijayanagara chieftain
Narasimhaswamy		Melkote	Mandya	c.15th century	According to historian George Michell, the massive gateway on the hilltop (gopura) is unfinished.
Virupaksha		Hampi	Vijayanagara	14th-16th centuries	UNESCO World Heritage Site
Temple tank (Pushkarni)		Hampi	Vijayanagara	16th century	Stepped temple tank in Hoysala style, UNESCO World Heritage Site
Hazara Rama		Hampi	Vijayanagara	c.1406-1542	UNESCO World heritage site
Chandikeshwara		Hampi	Vijayanagara	c.1545	UNESCO World Heritage Site
Uddhana Virabhadra		Hampi	Vijayanagara	c.1545	UNESCO World Heritage Site
Pattabhirama		Hampi	Vijayanagara	c.1529-1546	UNESCO World Heritage Site
Alvar group		Hampi	Vijayanagara	c.1556	Five temples were built for the Vaishnava saints Tirumangai, Mudal, Nammalvar, Tirumalishai & Ramanuja; UNESCO World Heritage Site
Kallina Ratha		Hampi	Vijayanagara	c.1529-1546	UNESCO World Heritage Site
Achyutaraya		Hampi	Vijayanagara	c.1529-1546	UNESCO World Heritage Site
Sasivekalu Ganesha		Hampi	Vijayanagara	15th century	UNESCO World Heritage Site
Kadalekalu Ganesha		Hampi	Vijayanagara	15th century	UNESCO World Heritage Site
Prasanna Virupaksha		Hampi	Vijayanagara	c.1509	UNESCO World Heritage Site
Nandi monolith		Hampi	Vijayanagara	15th century	UNESCO World Heritage Site
Ugra Narasimha		Hampi	Vijayanagara	15th century	UNESCO World Heritage Site
Badavi linga		Hampi	Vijayanagara	15th century	UNESCO World Heritage Site
Mallikarjuna		Hospet	Vijayanagara	1406–1422	Located in Mallapanagudi, close to Hospet
Vishnu		Hampi	Vijayanagara	16th century	UNESCO World Heritage Site
Chandrashekara		Hampi	Vijayanagara	c.1406-1446	UNESCO World Heritage Site
Balakrishna		Hampi	Vijayanagara	c.1509-1529	UNESCO World Heritage Site
Raghunatha		Hampi	Vijayanagara	c.1529-1542	UNESCO World Heritage Site
Vitthala		Hampi	Vijayanagara	c.1426-1542	UNESCO World Heritage Site
Virupaksha		Virupakshi	Kolar	15th century	
Vijayendra		Bethamangala	Kolar	15th century	
Chaturmukha (Jain)		Karkala	Uttara Kannada	c.1586-1587	Literally means "four faced" temple.
Bahubali monolith (Jain)		Karkala	Uttara Kannada	c.1431-1432	The monolith of Bahubali here stands twelve and half meters tall.
Parshwanatha Basadi (Jain)		Gerusoppa	Uttara Kannada	1581	The Basadi is also called Ratnatraya Badasi and was built by Rangapparajodeya. It has shrines for Neminatha, Parsvanatha and Vardhamana.
Shantappa Naika Tirumala		Bhatkal	Uttara Kannada	1555	Built by Shantappa Nayaka
Virupaksha		Gokarna	Uttara Kannada	1570	Built by Queen Virambika
Bala Kini Raghunatha		Bhatkal	Uttara Kannada	1590	Built by Bala Kini
Khetapai Narayan		Bhatkal	Uttara Kannada	1540	Built by local chief Ketapayya
Bahubali monolith (Jain)		Venur	Uttara Kannada	c.1606	The monolith was built by the local Ajila Chiefs.
Gangadhareshvara		Shivagange	Bangalore rural	c.1600	Shivagange was the principal seat of the Gowda rulers, the founders of Bangalore. Portraits of Kempe Gowda I (dated c.1608) and his two brothers are installed in the rock cut chamber of the temple.
Gavi Gangadhareshvara		Bengaluru	Bangalore	c.1600	The cave temple was built by Kempe Gowda I in the 16th century.
Kollur Mookambika		Kollur	Udupi	c.1616	Built by Venkatappa Nayaka of the Nayaka Dynasty of Keladi
Chandranatha(Jain)		Bhatkal	Uttara Kannada	c.1484	The temples was built by Hadavalli prince Salvendra
Aryadurga		Ankola	Uttara Kannada	1505	
Partakali Jivottam		Gokarna	Uttara Kannada	1560	
Mahalasa Narayan		Kumta	Uttara Kannada	1560	
Rameshwara		Keladi	Shimoga	Early 16th century	The Rameshvara shrine was built by Chudappa Nayaka (c.1499–1530), the founder of the dynasty, and the adjoining Veerabhadra shrine was built by his successor Sadashiva Nayaka (r.1530–1566).
Aghoreshwara		Ikkeri	Shimoga	Late 16th century	The Aghoreshwara shrine was built by Dodda Sankanna Nayaka (or Sankanna I, r.1566–1570) who moved his capital from Keladi to Ikkeri.
Mahaganapati Mahamaya		Shirali	Uttara Kannada	1560	
Ishwara		Baindur	Udupi	16th century	
Balarama		Malpe	Dakshina Kannada	16th century	
Indrani		Manipal	Dakshina Kannada	16th century	
Bhoga Nandishwara		Nandi	Chikkaballapura	15th century	A pavilion with elegant pillars between the two major shrines, a navaranga mantapa (pavilion) with Yali pillars and a large stepped temple tank (kalyani or pushkarni) were added in this period.
Kanakachalapathi		Kanakagiri	Koppal	c.1509–1529	
Ananthasayana		Ananthasayanagudi	Ballari	c.1524	
Mahaganapati		Kurudumale	Kolar	16th century	
Teru Malleshwara		Hiriyur	Chitradurga	c.1466	
Nandi (Bull)		Bengaluru	Bangalore Urban	c.1509–1529	
Someshwara		Bengaluru	Bangalore Urban	16th century	One of the oldest temples in Bangalore, major additions or modifications to which were made during the late Vijayanagara Empire period under the rule of Kempe Gowda I (Hiriya Kempe Gowda).
Gavi Gangadhareshwara Temple		Bengaluru	Bangalore Urban	16th century	Cave temple and one of the oldest temples in Bangalore, dates from the late Vijayanagara Empire period, built by Kempe Gowda I (Hiriya Kempe Gowda).
Gangadhareshwara Temple, Shivagange		Shivagange	Bangalore Rural	16th century	Cave temple, dates from the late Vijayanagara Empire period, built by Kempe Gowda I (Hiriya Kempe Gowda).
Lakshmikanthaswamy		Tumkur	Tumkur	c.1560	
Gopala Krishnaswami		Thimmalapura	Vijayanagara	c.1539	
Shiva		Thimmalapura	Vijayanagara	c.1539	
Ranganatha		Rangasthala	Chikkaballapura	c.1600	
Gaurishvara		Yelandur	Chamarajanagar	c.1500	The temple was constructed by a local chief Singedepa Devabhupala of the Hadinadu chiefdom, a feudatory of the 16th century Vijayanagara Empire
Jambunatheshwara		Hospet	Vijayanagara	c.1500	
Vijayanarayana		Gundlupet	Chamarajanagar	15th century	
Ranganatha		Magadi	Ramanagara	c.1524	The gopura (tower) were built by the Vijayanagar emperor Krishnadevaraya in the 16th century and was later renovated by King Jayachamaraja Wodeyar of the Mysore Kingdom.
Someshwara		Magadi	Ramanagara	c.1569	Built by Kempe Gowda I, the founder of Bangalore
Gunja Narasimhaswamy		Tirumakudal Narasipur	Mysore	16th century	The temple was under the patronage of the local governor of Mysore, during the Vijayanagara rule over South India.
