= Kanakachalapathi Temple, Kanakagiri =

Kanakachalapathi temple
- Hindu Temple
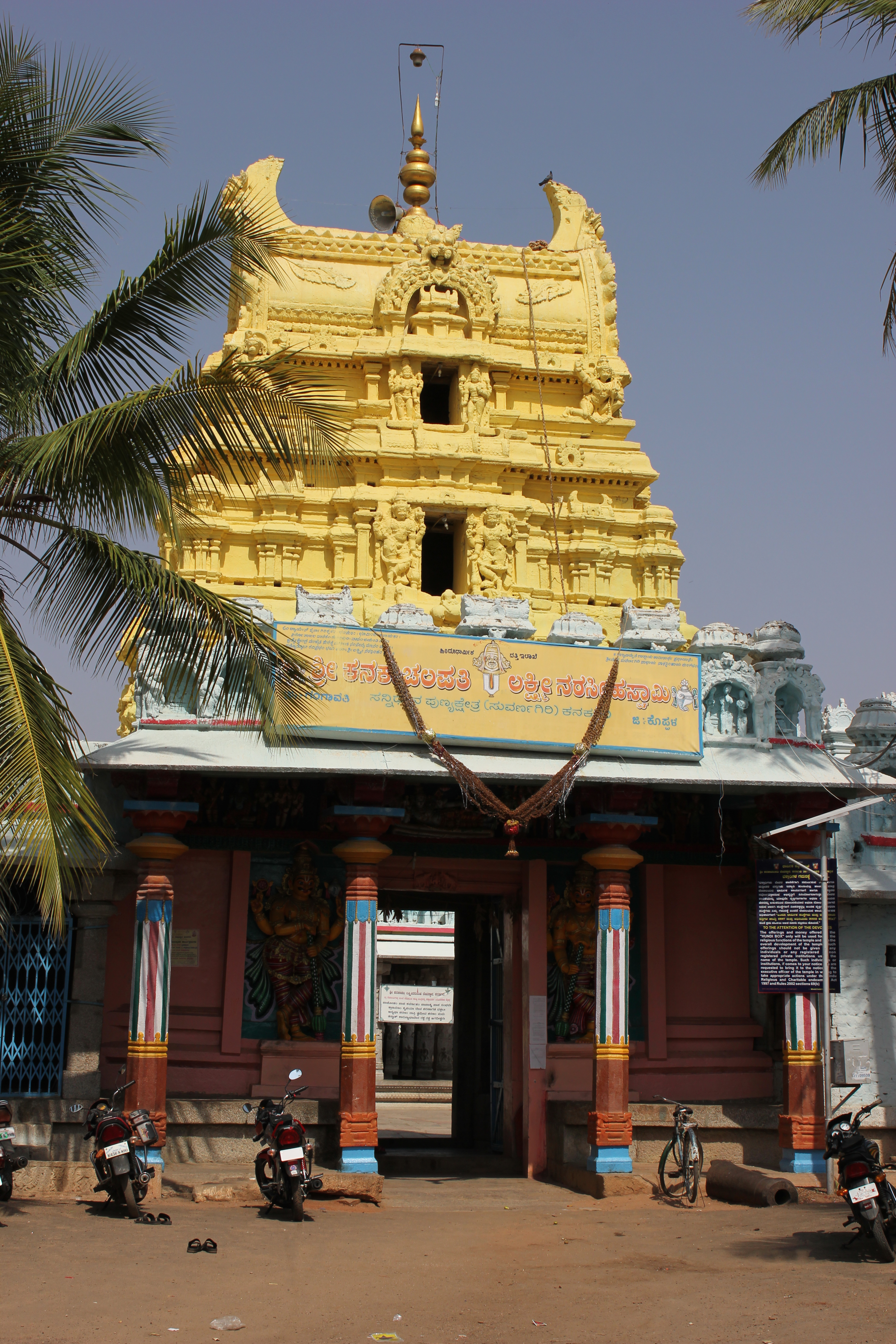
- Kanakachalapathi temple (16th century)

- Location in Karnataka, India
- Coordinates: 15°33′N 76°24′E
- Country: India
- State: Karnataka
- District: Koppal

Languages
  - Official: Kannada
- Time zone: UTC+5:30 (IST)
- PIN: 583283
- Nearest city: Gangavathi
- Website: www.kanakagiri.in

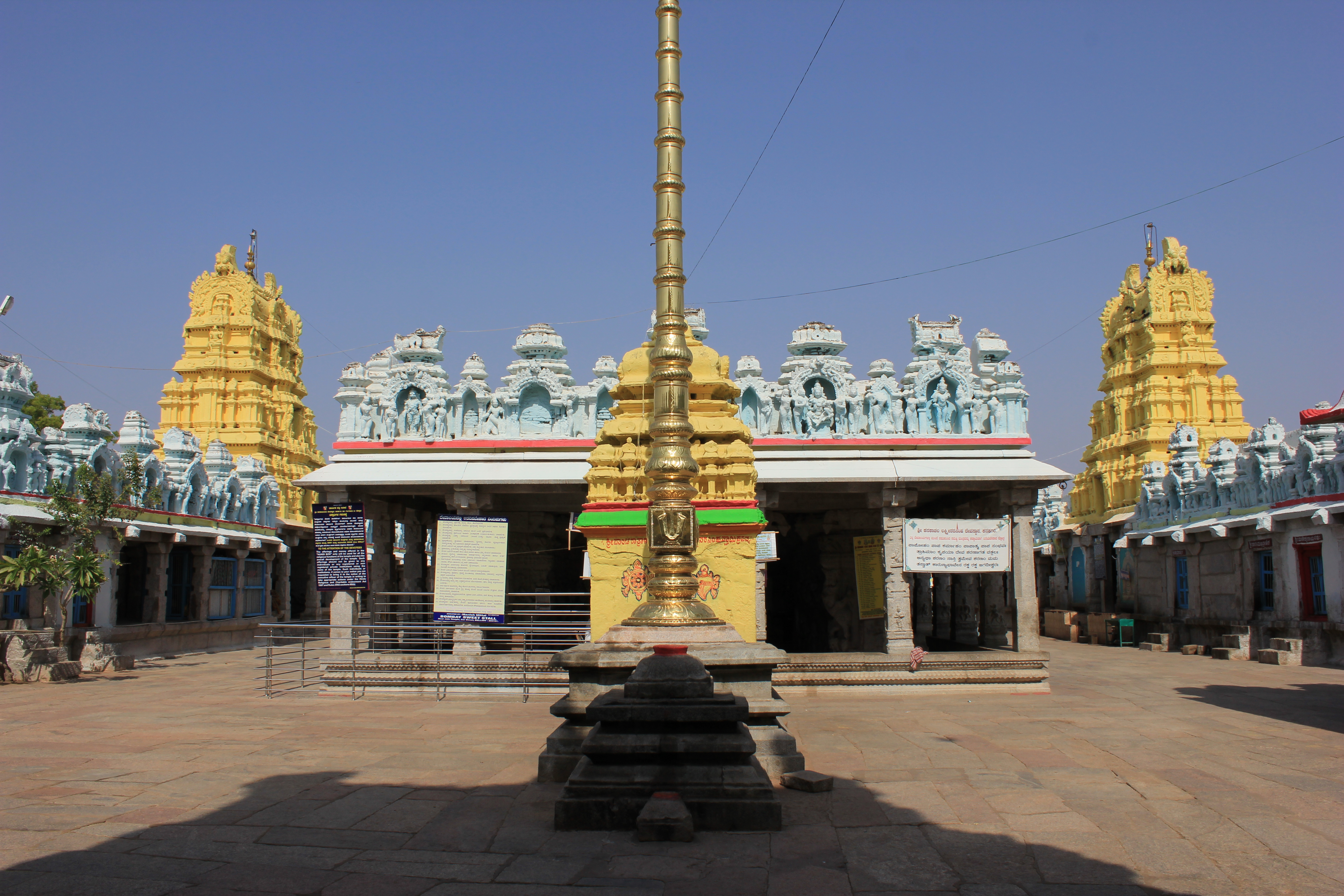
View of Kanakachalapathi temple from entrance mahadwara (main entrance) at Kanakagiri in the Koppal district

The Kanakachalapathi temple is a 16th-century Hindu temple dedicated to the god Vishnu. It is located in the town of Kanakagiri, in the Gangavathi taluk of Koppal district in the Karnataka state, India. Kanakagiri, known in ancient times as "Swarnagiri" (lit, "Hill of Gold") is about 3 km from the district headquarters Koppal city, 380 km north of Bangalore city and 200 km east of Belagavi city.

Kanakagiri is known to get its present name from Kanaka Muni, a Hindu saint who performed penance there. The historically important Koppal city, known in ancient inscriptions as Kopana is also of archeological significance due to the discovery of two inscriptions from the rule of Emperor Ashoka (3rd ceneutry B.C.E.) at the nearby villages Palkigundu and Gavimatha. After the end of the Maurya Empire rule over the region when Koppal had been a southern viceroyalty, Koppal passed into the hands of notable dynasties of the Deccan: the Satavahana dynasty, the Western Ganga Dynasty, the Hoysalas and the Chalukya dynasty. The earliest available Kannada classic, the Kavirajamarga of King Nrupatunga Amoghavarsha I (r.814-878 A.D.), mentions Koppal in the sentence Viditha Maha Kopana Nagara.

The Kanakachalapathi temple is an example of Dravidian architecture of the Vijayanagara era. It is a protected monument under the Karnataka state division of the Archaeological Survey of India. The temple was built by the ruling vassal polyagar (Nayaka or feudal lord). The temple complex is a large one with spacious halls (mantapa) and massive Yali pillars. There a three well executed, tiered gopuras (tower over entrance) over as many entrances. Sculpture in the temple includes those of mythological figures in wood and pilaster, and that of kings and queens in black stone. The popularity of the temple is supported by a local saying: "people with eyes must see Kanakagiri and those with legs, Hampi", an affirmation that the Kanakachalapathi temple is a delight to the eyes whereas one needs to tread tirelessly to enjoy the architectural wonders of near by Hampi (UNESCO World Heritage Site), the royal centre of Vijayanagara, the capital of the Vijayanagara Empire. In the months of February and March, during the Phalguna season, the temple hosts a popular fair called the "Kanakachalapathi fair" (Jatra) .

== Gallery ==
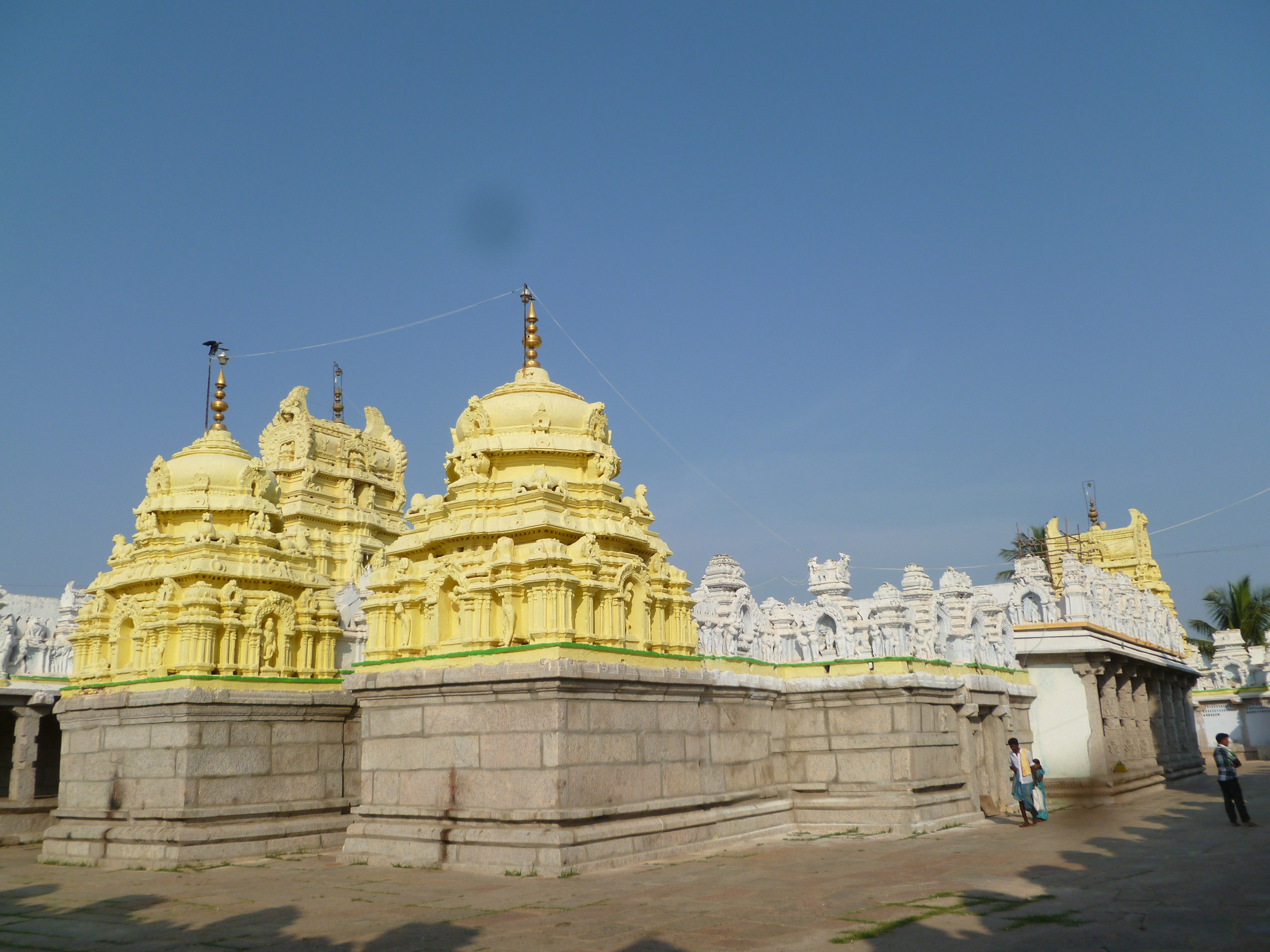
View from the rear of the Kanakachalapathi temple at Kanakagiri

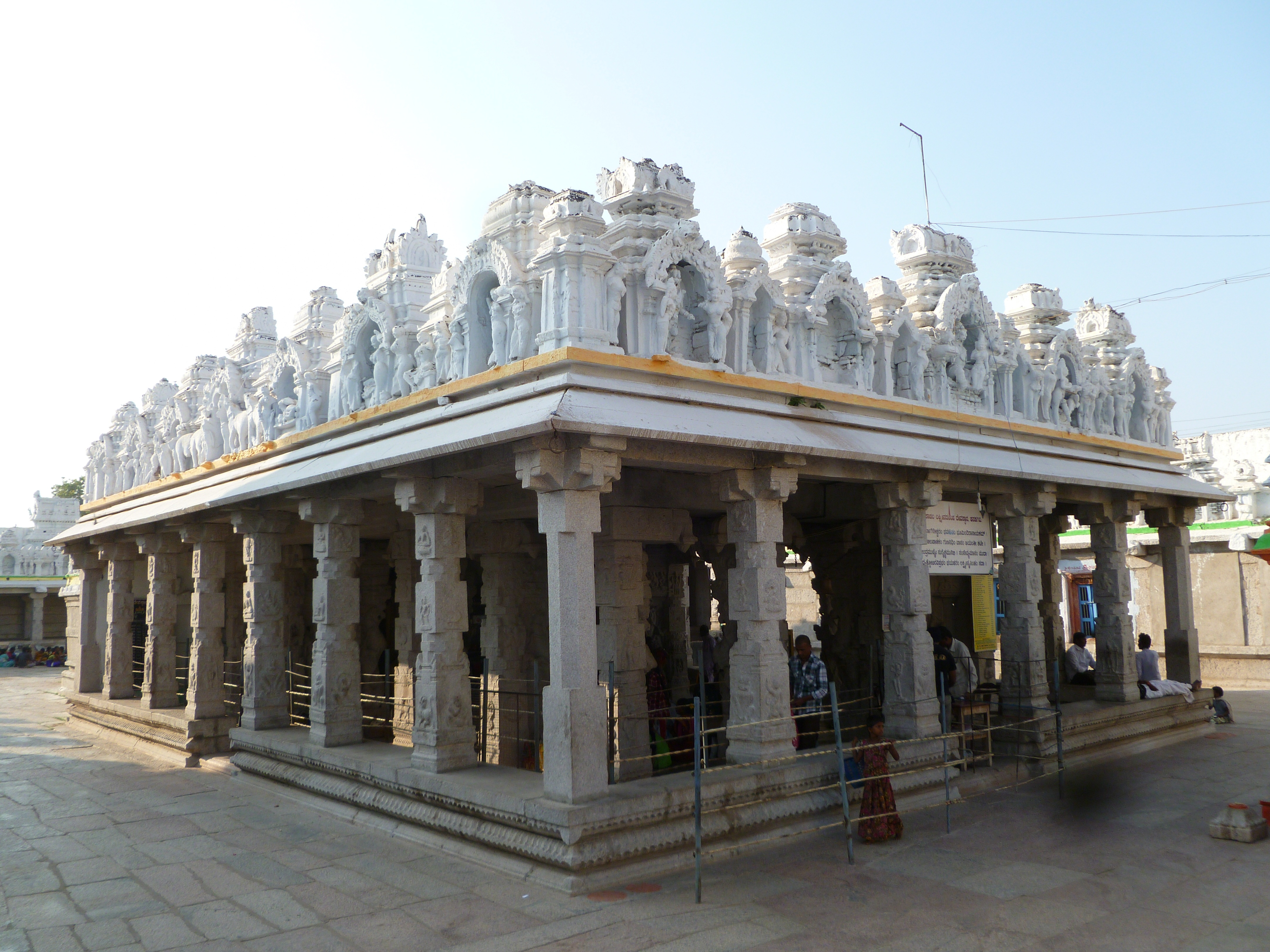
Spacious open mantapa of Kanakachalapathi temple at Kanakagiri

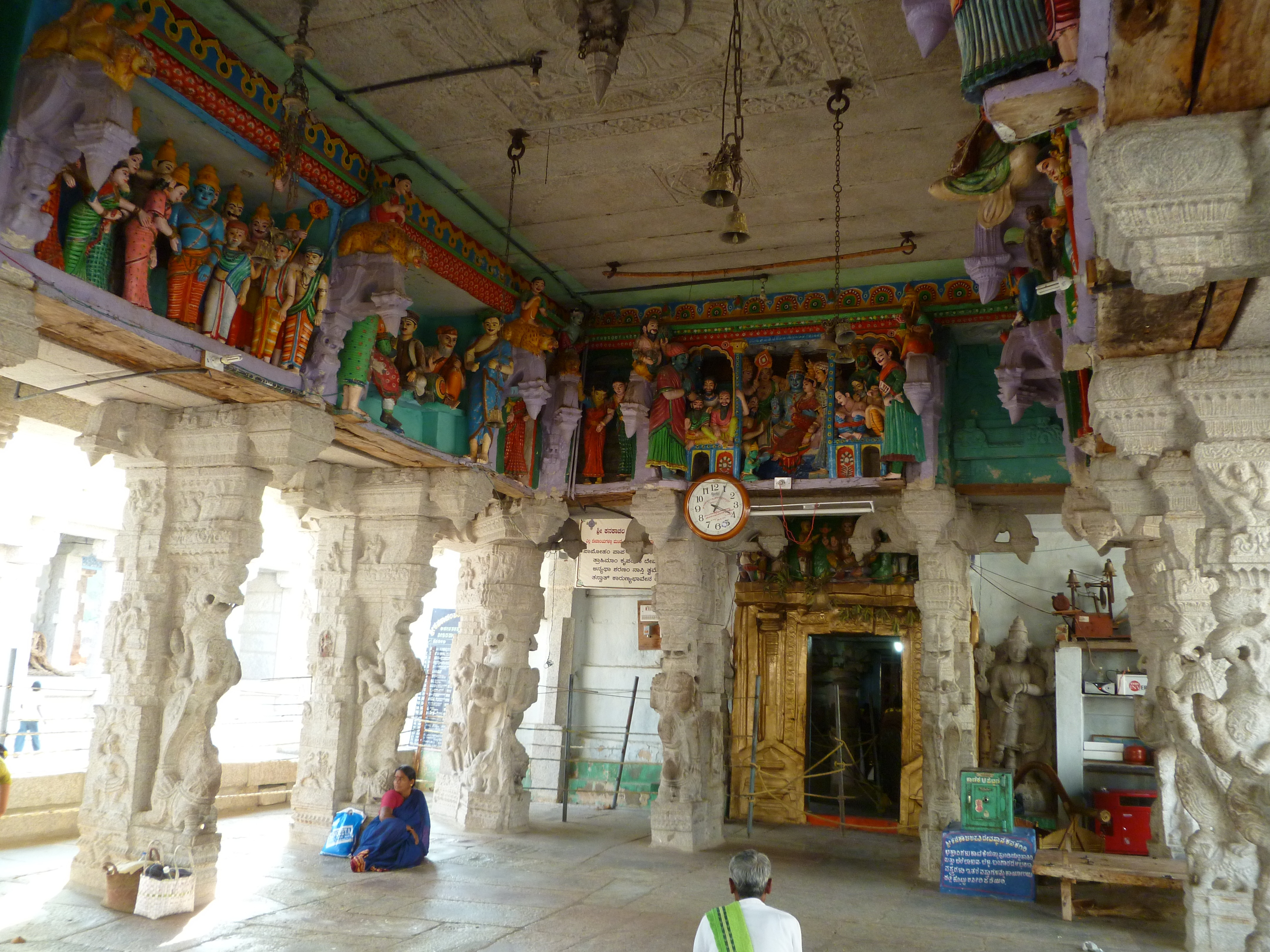
Pilaster dolls adorn the ceiling over the mantapa in the Kanakachalapathi temple at Kanakagiri

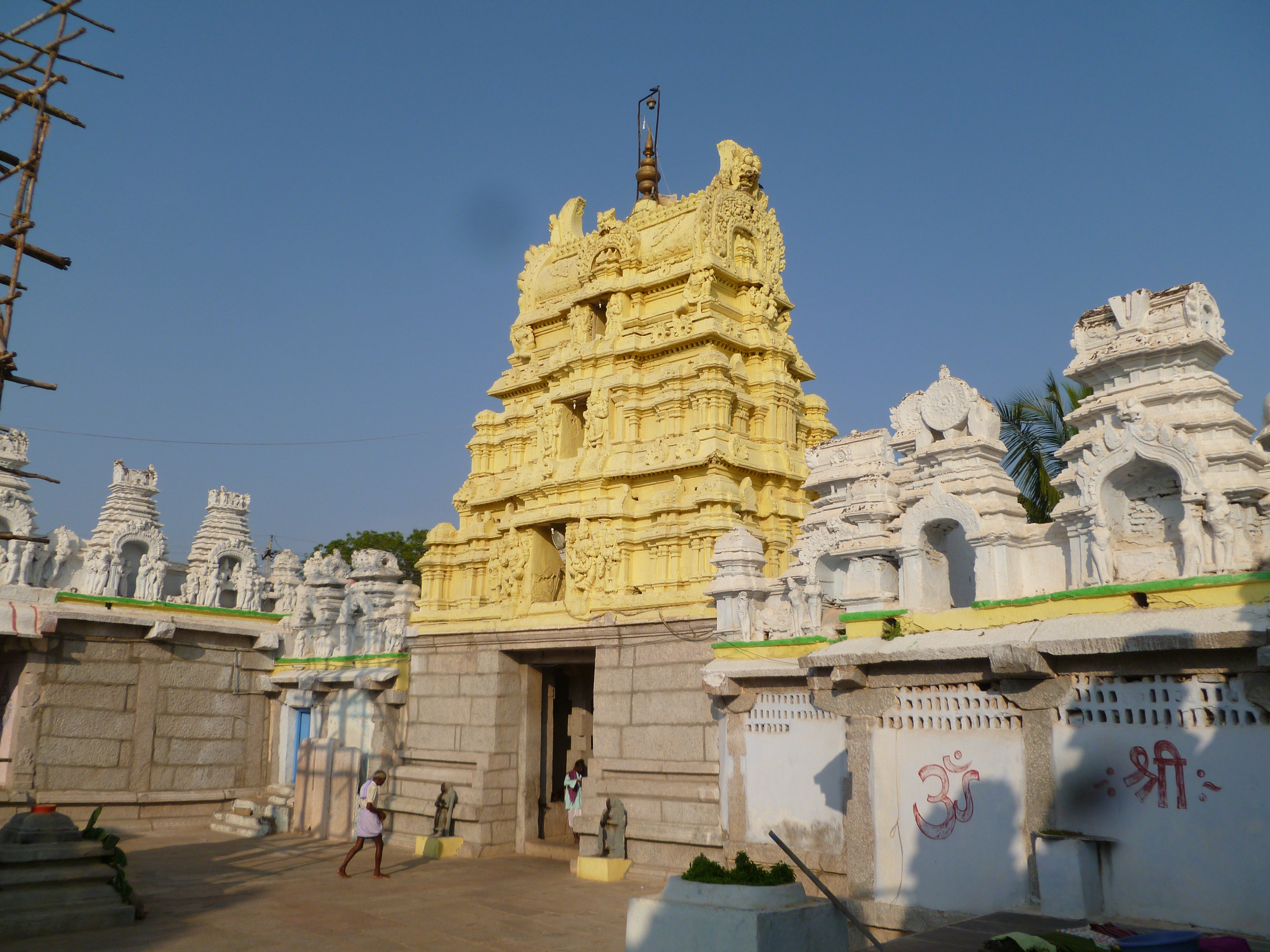
View of the tower over main entrance from within the courtyard of Kanakachalapathi temple at Kanakagiri

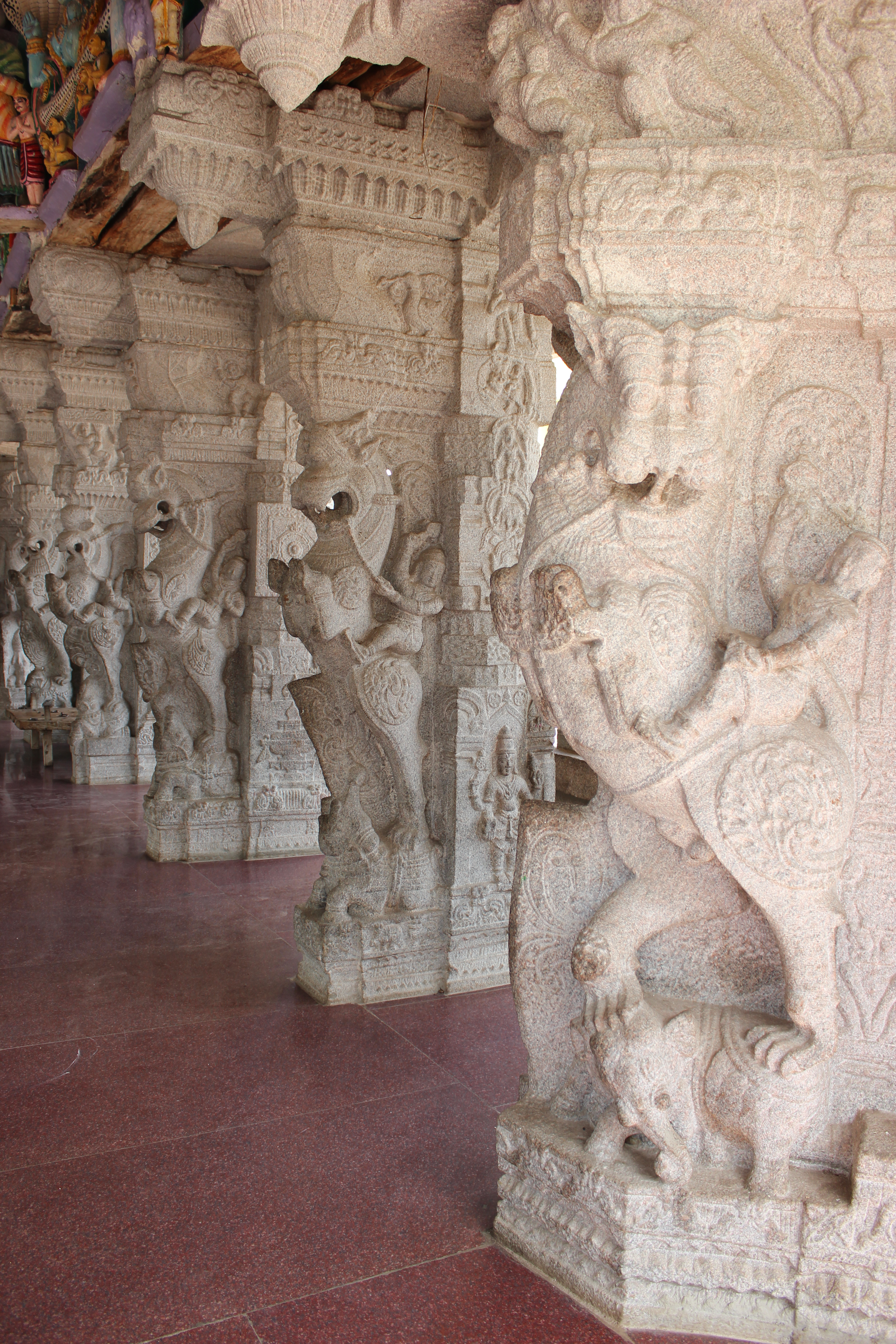
Yali pillars in the Kanakachalapathi temple at Kanakagiri

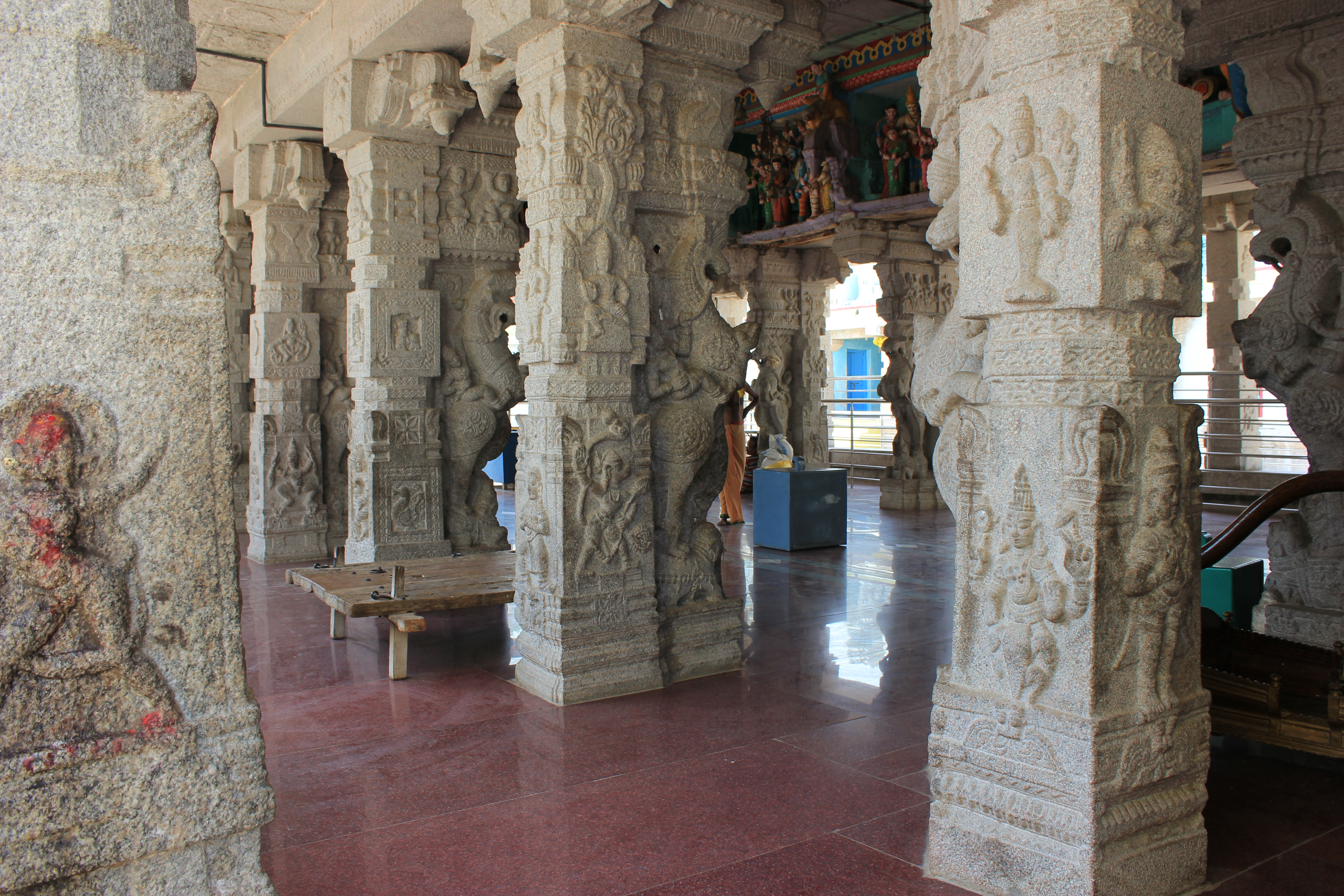
View from the courtyard looking in to the open mantapa of Kanakachalapathi temple at Kanakagiri

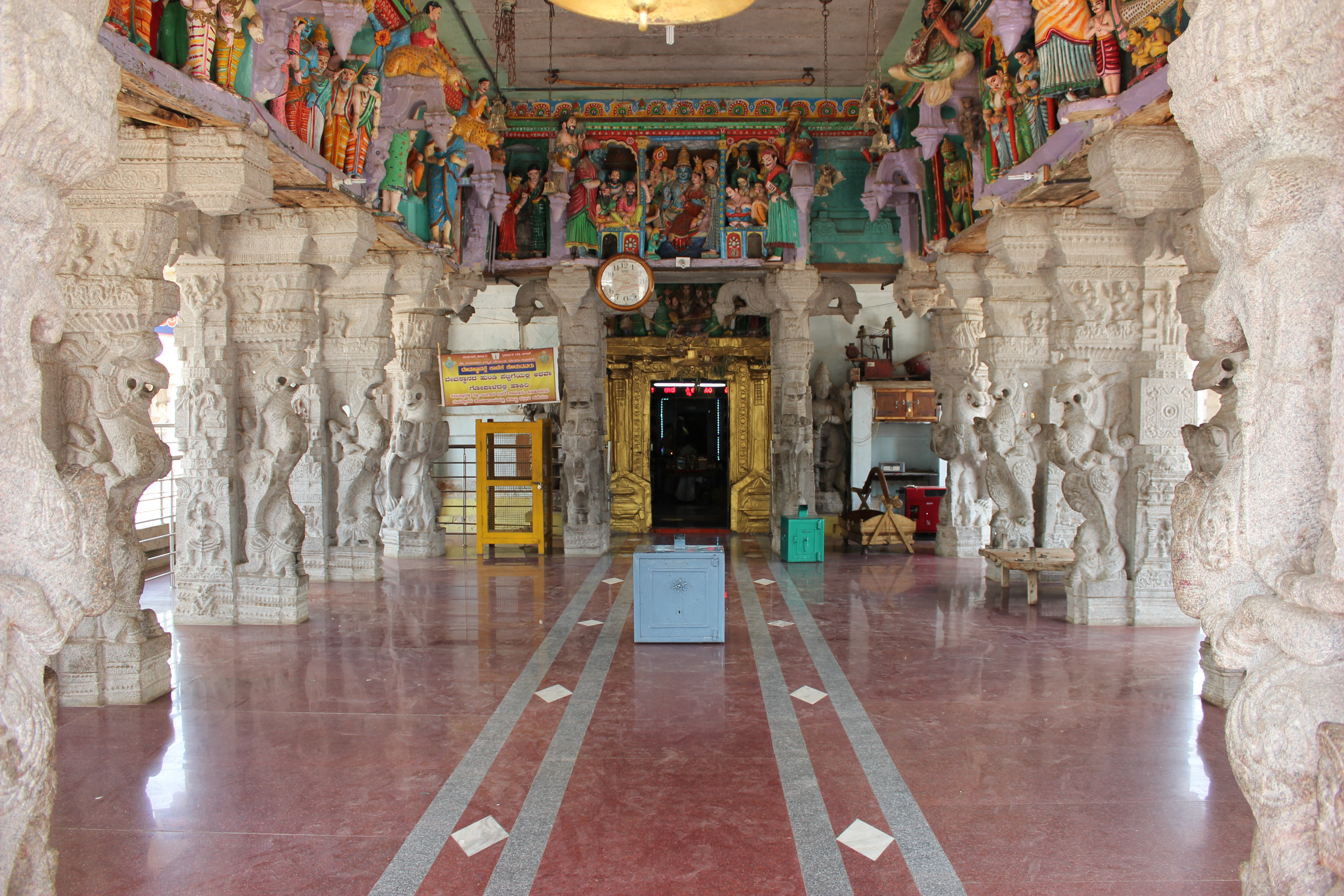
Large open mantapa with Yali pillars in the Kanakachalapathi temple at Kanakagiri

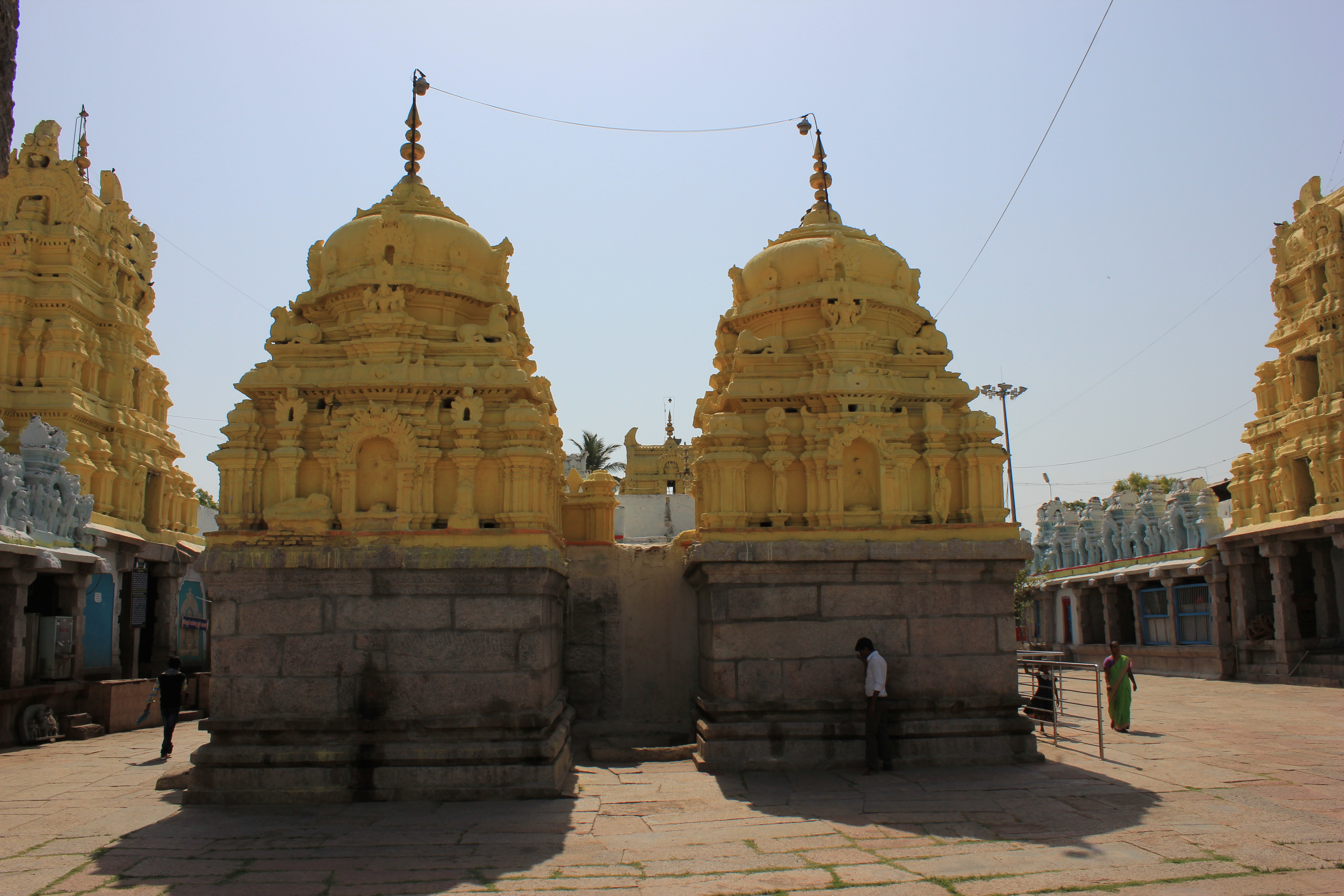
Rear view of the Kanakachalapathi temple at Kanakagiri

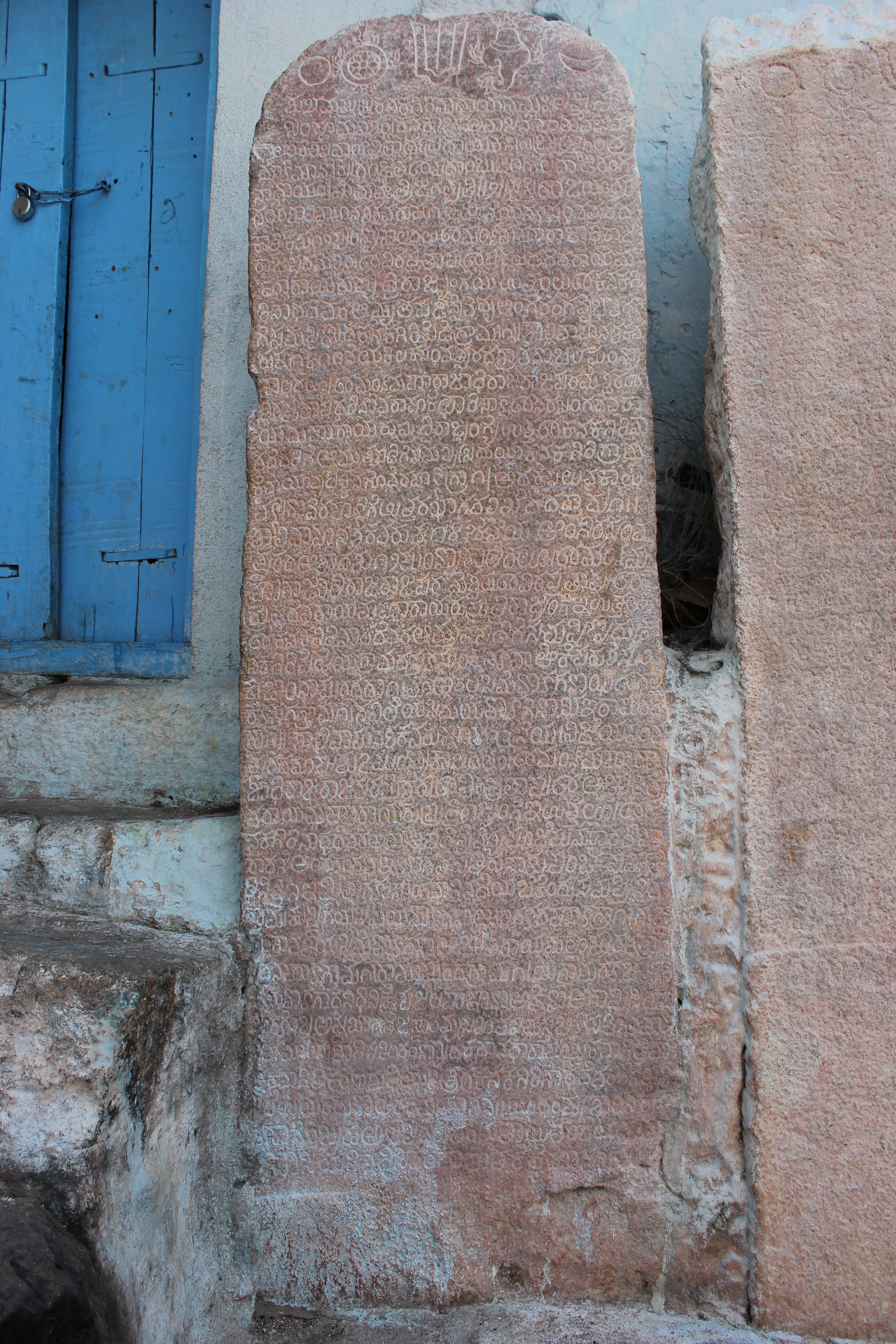
16th century Kannada inscription in the Kanakachalapathi temple at Kanakagiri

== See also ==
- Temples of North Karnataka
- Vijayanagara Empire
- List of Vijayanagara era temples in Karnataka
- Vijayanagara architecture
- Hampi
