= Kanakagiri =

Kanakgiri Suvarnagiri
- town/taluk
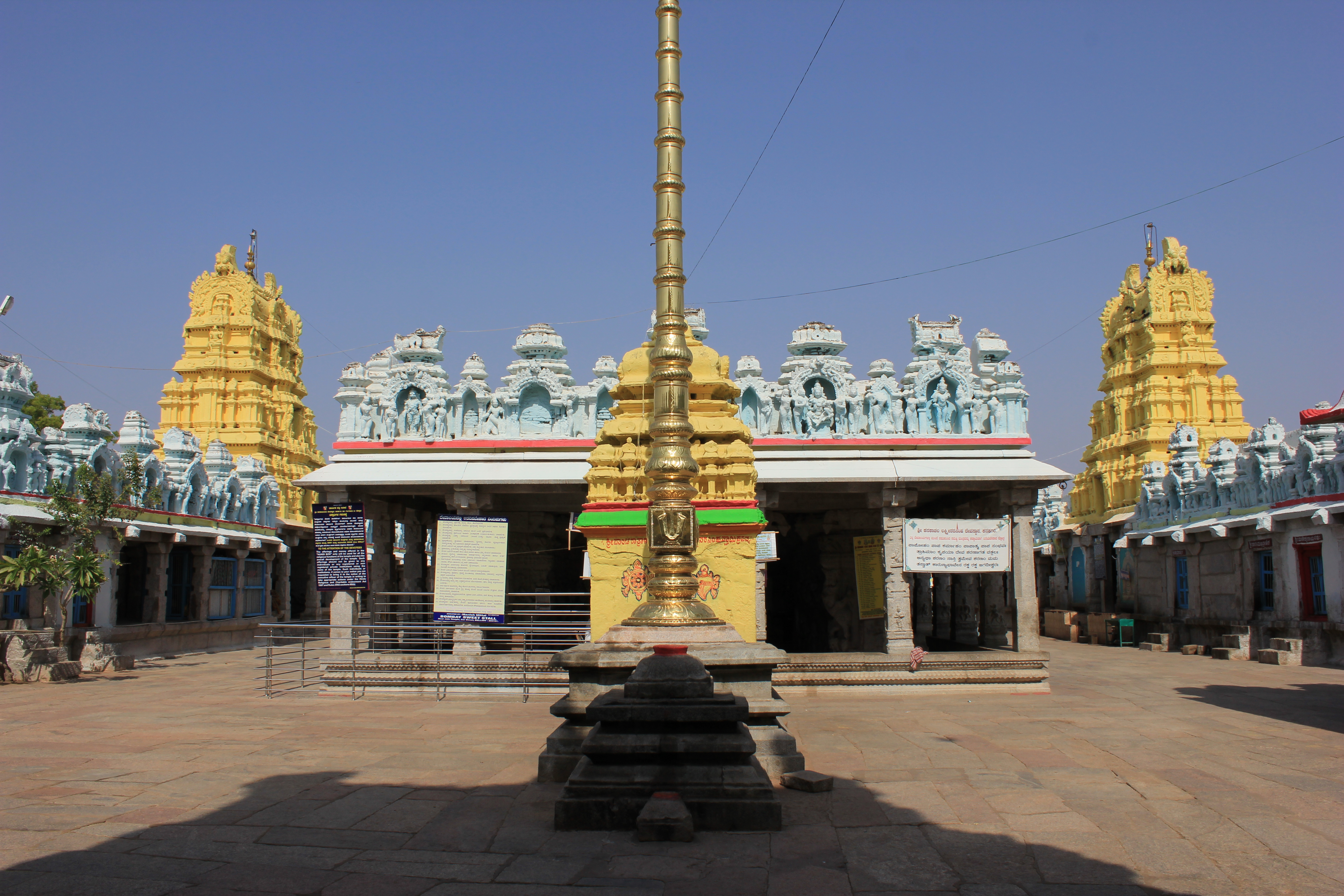
- Kanakachalapathi temple

- Location in Karnataka, India
- Coordinates: 15°33′N 76°24′E
- Country: India
- State: Karnataka
- District: Koppal

Population
  - Total: 22,098

Languages
  - Official: Kannada
- Time zone: UTC+5:30 (IST)
- PIN: 583283
- ISO 3166 code: IN-KA
- Vehicle registration: KA 37
- Nearest city: Gangavathi
- Lok Sabha constituency: Koppal
- Vidhan Sabha constituency: Kanakagiri Assembly constituency
- Website: www.kanakagiri.in

Kanakagiri (also known as Suvarnagiri) is a town in Karnataka state of India. It was a provincial capital of the Mauryan Empire and later became the capital of the Nayaka dynasty who were the Palegars (feudatory) of the Vijayanagara Empire. It is also the site of the historical site Kanakachalapathi Temple (Kanakachalapathi Mandir) which was built by the Nayakas.

== Geography ==
Kanakagiri is situated in Koppal district, 20 km northwest of the town of Gangavati in the Indian state of Karnataka.

== Temple ==
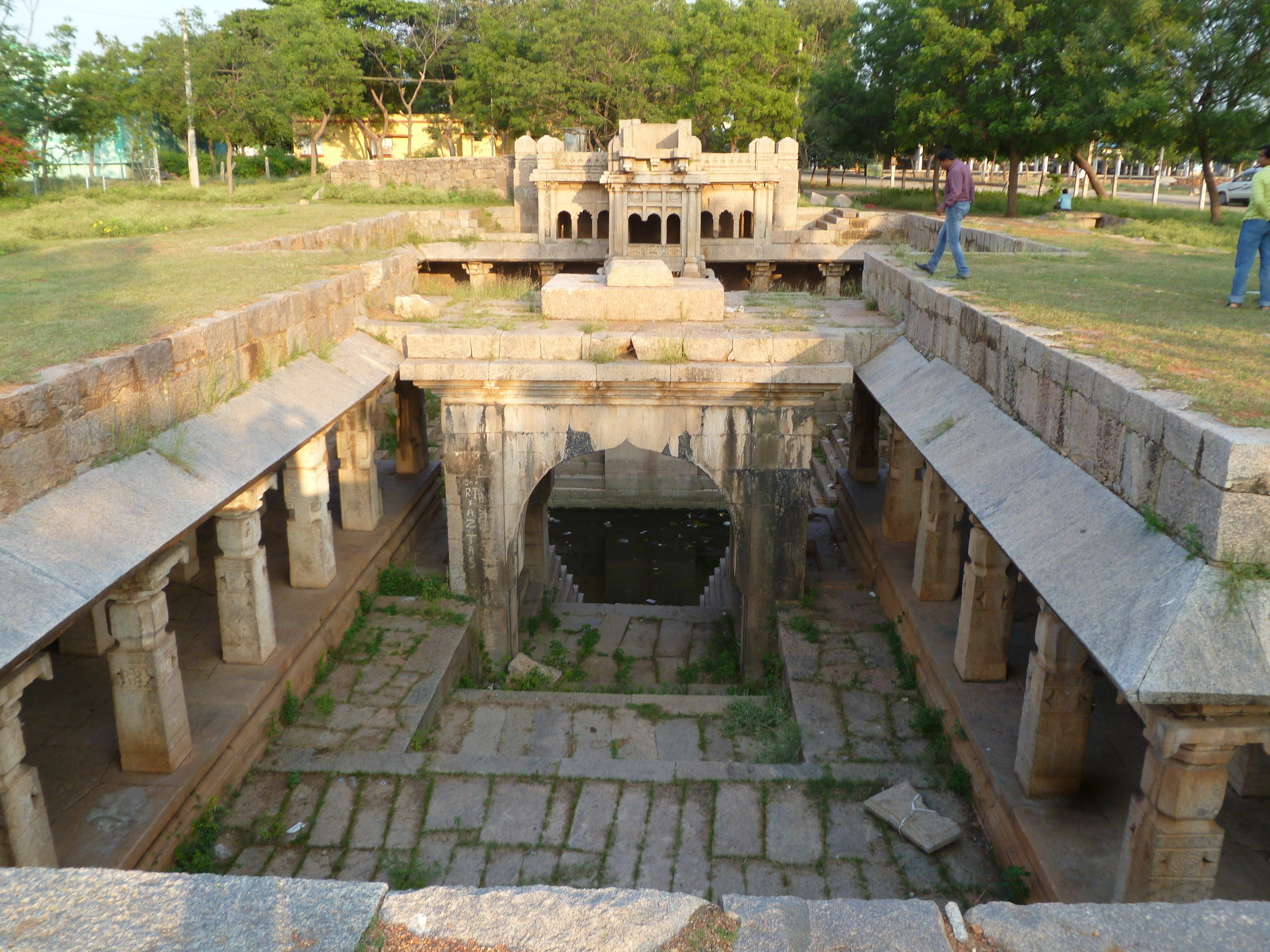
Venkatappa Naik royal bath Kanakagiri

Kanakachalapathi temple was built by the Nayakas of Kanakagiri. Its halls and pillars are a unique example of south Indian architecture from the Vijayanagara period. The gopuras and walls are adorned with sculptures, including statues of Rajas and Ranis in black polished stone, plaster models, and wooden statues of mythological figures.

Kanakagiri Jain tirth is a complex of Jain temple built by Western Ganga Dynasty in the 5th or 6th century.

A royal bath constructed by Raja Venkatappa Nayaka in 1586 sits on the outskirts of Kanakagiri.

== Fort ==
The Hemagudda Fort, about 20 km from Kanakagiri is next to the Kammatadurga Fort of Gandugali Kumara Rama. The fort was constructed in the 14th century. The fort has a temple of Durga Devi celebrating Dasara.

== Utsav ==
Kanakagiri Utsav is an annual fair associated with the Kanakachalapathi temple during Phalguna.

== Gallery ==
Photo Gallery
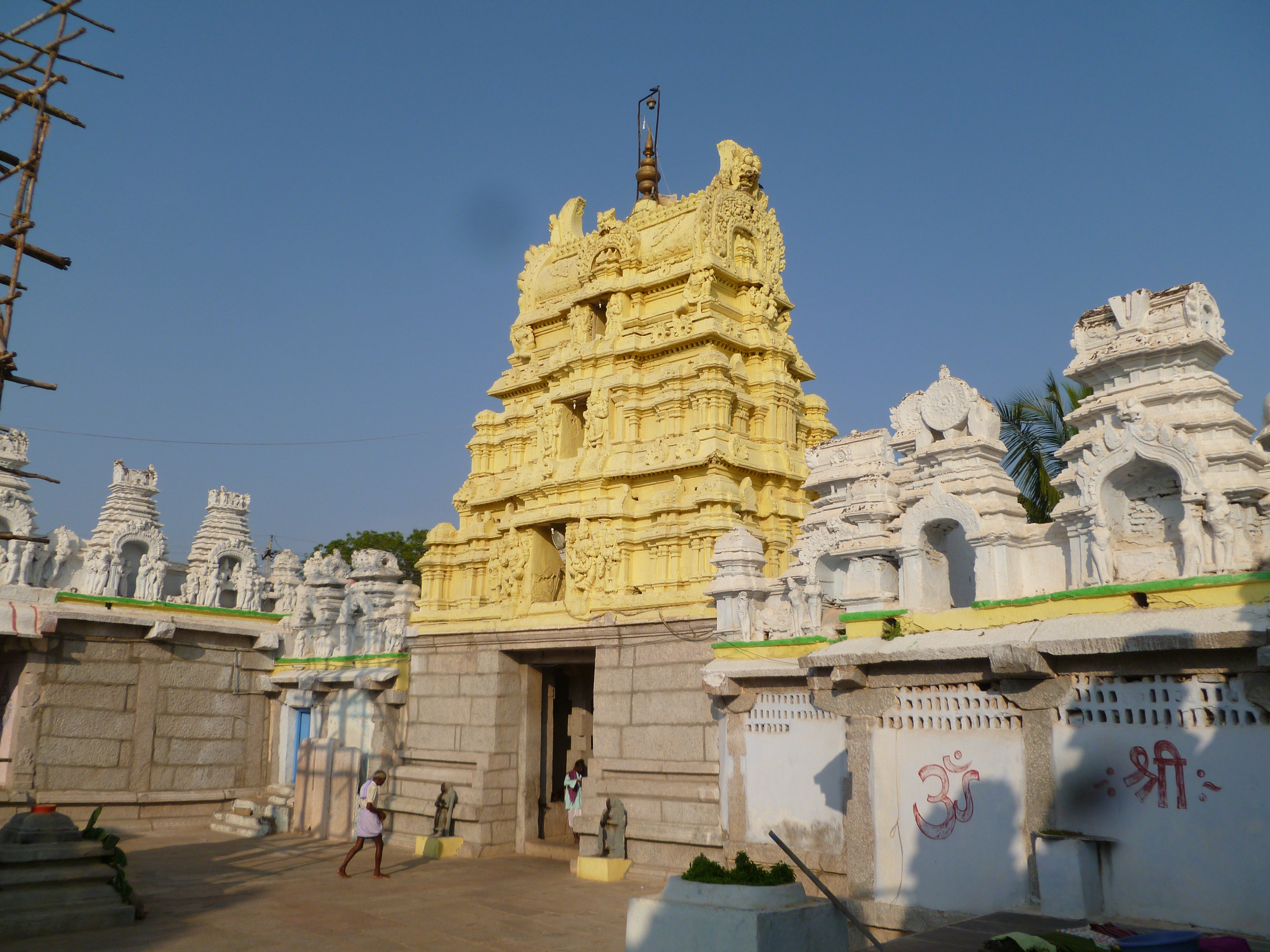
Kanakagiri Kanakachalapathi temple

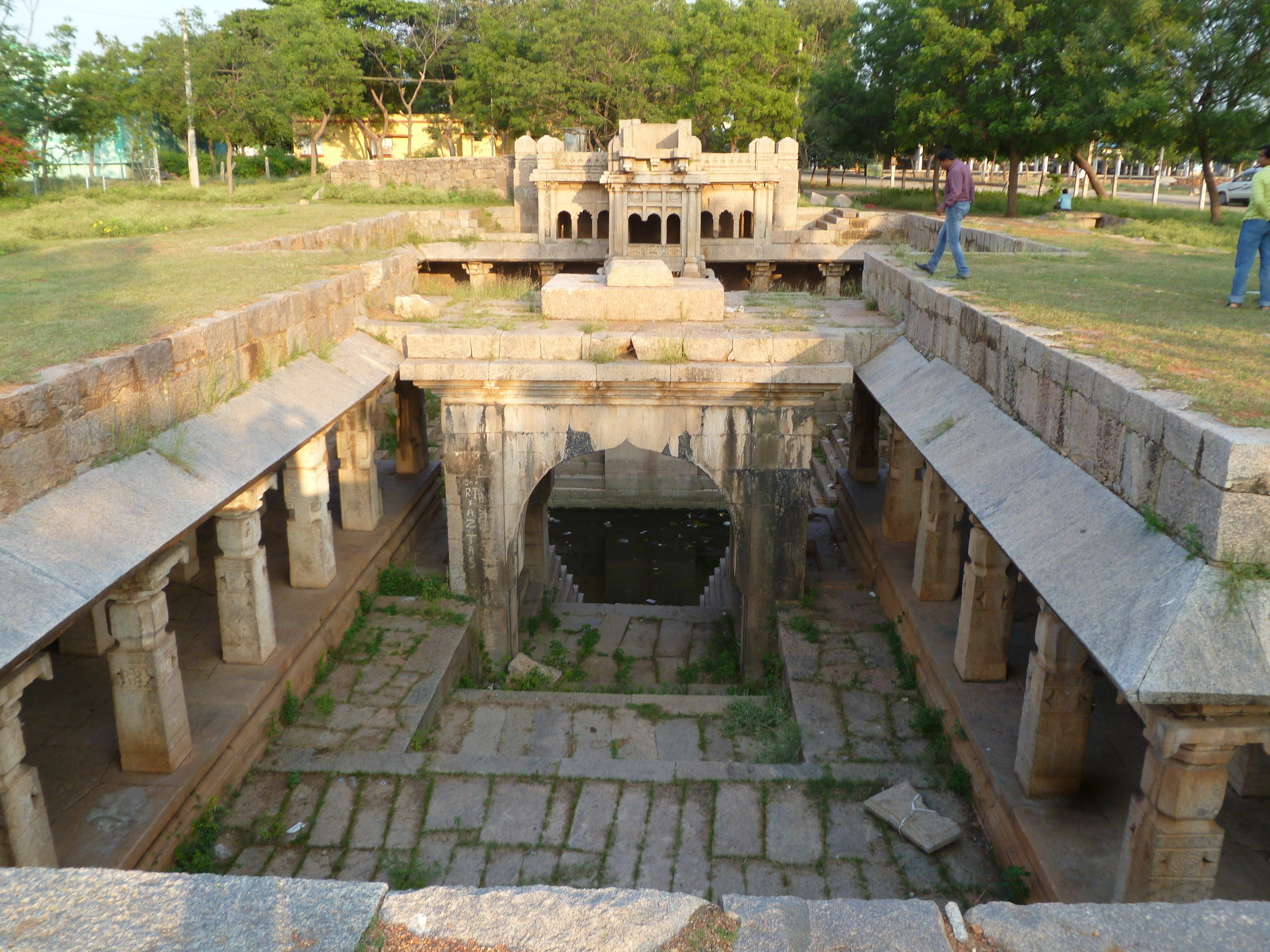
Venkatappa Naik royal bath Kanakagiri

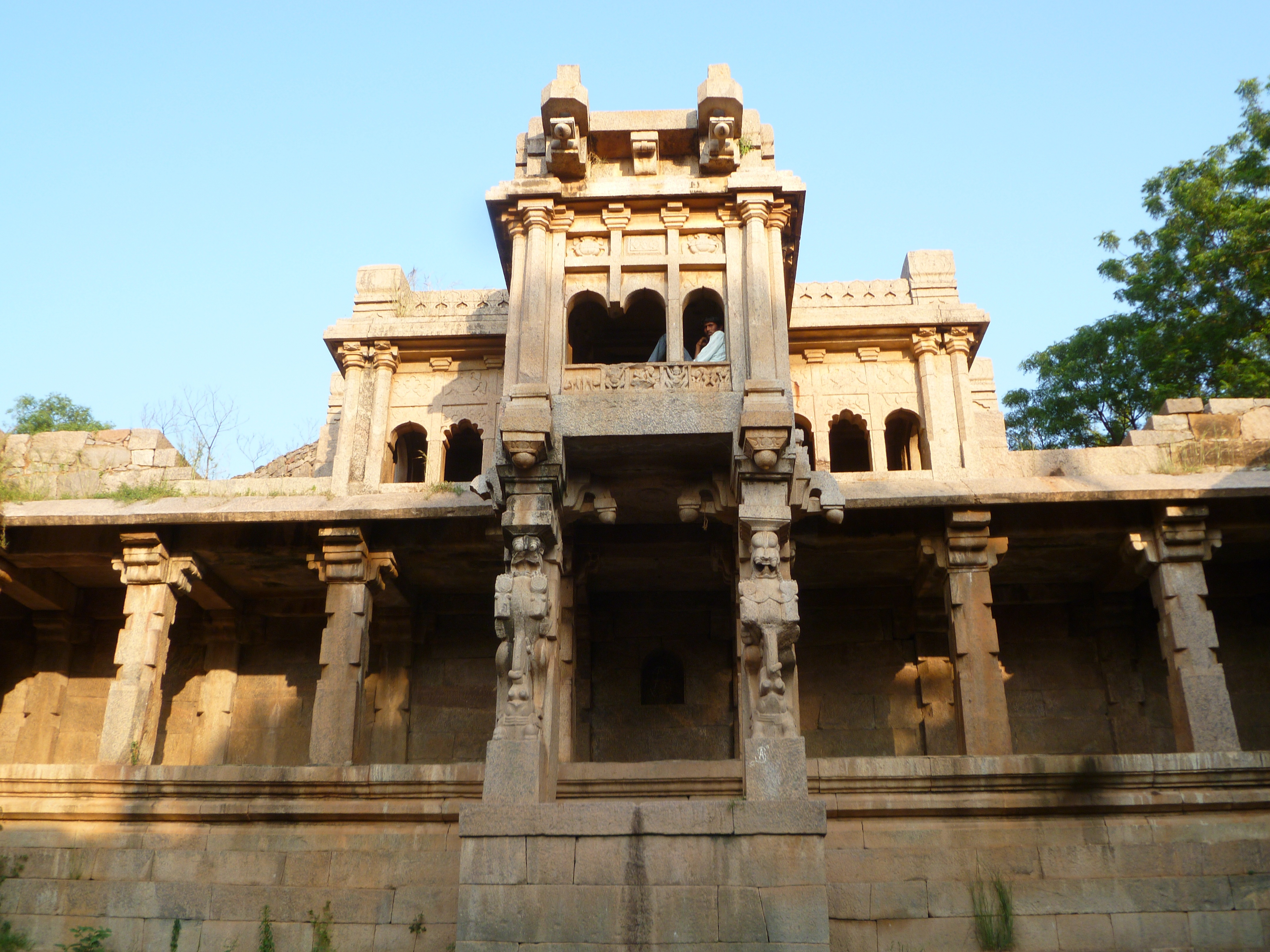
Venkatappa Naik royal bath Kanakagiri

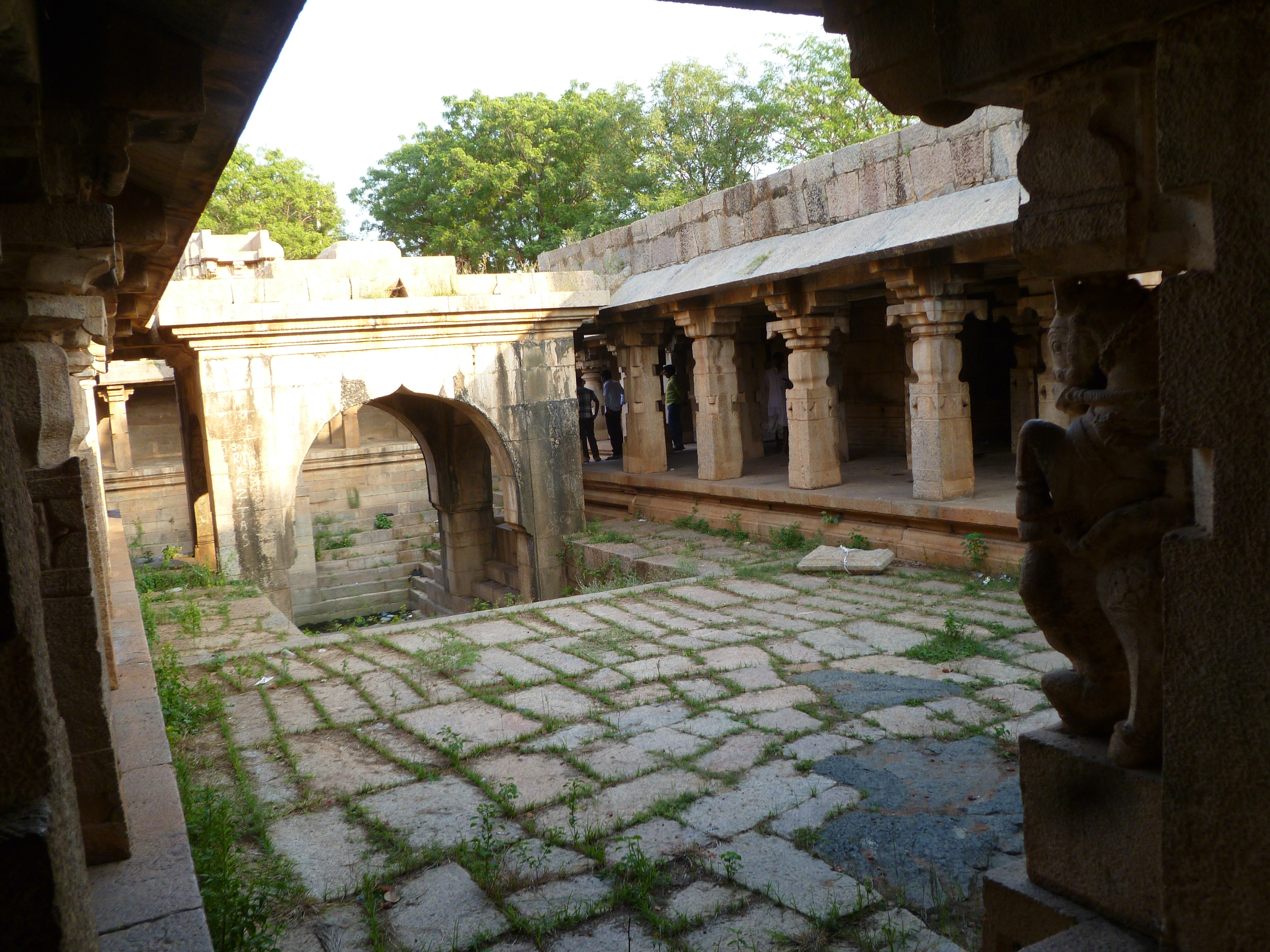
Venkatappa Naik royal bath Kanakagiri

== See also ==
- Kanakagiri Jain Shri kshetra
- Temples of North Karnataka
- Vijayanagara Empire
- List of Vijayanagara era temples in Karnataka
- Vijayanagara architecture
- Mauryan Empire
- Hampi
- Anegondi
- Karatagi
- Gangavathi
- Koppal
- Karnataka
