= Kanakagiri Jain tirth =

Kanakagiri Jain Tirth kshetra
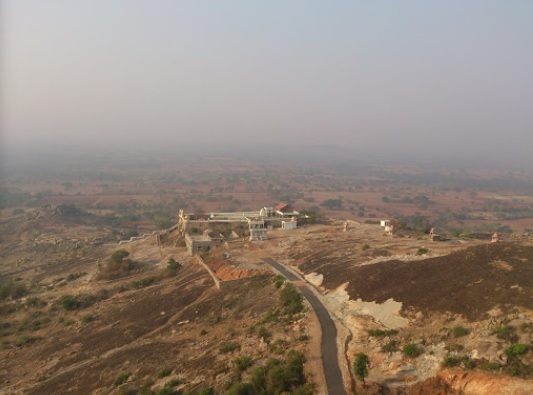
- Distant view of Kanakagiri Tirth

- Location within Karnataka Kanakagiri Jain tirth (India)

Religion
- Affiliation: Jainism
- Deity: Parshvanatha
- Festivals: Mahamastakabhisheka, Mahavir Jayanti

Location
- Location: Kanakagiri, Chamarajanagar, Karnataka
- Coordinates: 11°56′59.815″N 76°46′6.491″E

Architecture
- Creator: Western Ganga dynasty
- Established: 5th–6th century
- Temple: 3

Kanakagiri Jain tirth kshetra also known as Kanakadri and Hemantha Desha is situated at about 3 km from Maleyuru, Chamarajanagar district, 53 km from the Mysore city and 182 km from Bengaluru.

== History ==
It is one of the important Jain pilgrim centres of Karnataka known in ancient times as Hemanga Desha. It is believed that Jain saint Achrya Pujyapada established a monastery here in 5th century. The scriptures in Kanakagiri mentions that Mahavira visited this area and held a Samavasharan Divya Sabha (a meeting). Kanakgiri houses stone inscriptions dating to period of Western Ganga, Hoysala, Vijayanagara and Maharaja of Mysore.

The Parshvanatha temple was built by the kings of the Western Ganga dynasty in the 5th or 6th century. Kings of later dynasties such as the Hoysala, Vijayanagara and Wadiyar also patronised this temple. It is believed that one king worshipped Bhagwan Parshwanatha here before proceeding to a war in which he was victorious and hence he named the deity, Vijaya Parshwanatha.

A further inscription dated to 1117 CE records a grant made by Gangaraja, a general of the Hoysala ruler Vishnuvardhana, to the Jain pontiff Meghacandra-Siddhanta-deva. The grant of the village of Tippuru provides evidence for the continuing institutional and monastic importance of Kanakagiri during the Hoysala period. Kanakagiri is also associated with a monumental image of Bahubali. The image, located on Savanappan-Betta, is approximately 10 feet high and forms another important Jain monument of the pilgrimage centre.

According to inscription dated 909 CE, the temple was an important Jain center and mentions temple receiving grants under the leadership of Bhattaraka Kanakasena. An inscription dating back to 916 CE refers to construction of a Jain temple by Western Ganga King Nitimarga. During the reign of Hoysalas, more Jain images both rock cut and structural were added.

== Architecture ==
The main temple has a garbhagriha, sukanasa, navaranga and mukhamantapa. In addition to the structural temple, Kanakagiri contains rock-cut Jain imagery and loose sculptures distributed around the hill. The combination of structural temples, natural caves and monumental images reflects the long development of the site as a Jain pilgrimage centre.

== About Temple ==
The main temple on the 350 steps hillock is enclosed in a fort, has four main parts, namely, the mukhamantapa, the navaranga, the sukhanasi and the garbhagriha. This temple enshrines idols of five main deities together – Parshwanatha, Padmavati, Jwalamalini, Kushmandini, and Kshetrapala Bramha Yaksha. The garbhagriha houses Bhagwan Parshwanatha while the sukhanasi houses the rest. There are 3 temples and tonks of 24 tirthankar. This temple also includes an 18-feet monolithic idol of Bahubali.

Kanakagiri is the only Jain temple where Kalasarpadosha parihara puja is performed. According to legends, Queen Deverammanni of Mysore royal family once suffered from kalasarpadosha and found relief on worshiping the Goddesses here. So, she gave the temple a unique idol of the hood of snake bearing Dharanendra and Padmavathi figures. The idol is currently placed in the sukhanasi.

The complex also preserves Jain rock-cut sculptures. Approximately fourteen Tirthankara images are carved in low relief in a natural cavern at the site. Other sculptures include images of Suparshvanatha and Parshvanatha. There are 24 charan (foot prints) of the 24 Tirthankaras near the temple complex. There are caves on the hill where Jain saints once meditated. There is a Jain Mutt at the foot of the hill under the patronage of Swasthi Shree Bhuvanakeerthi Bhattaraka Swamiji.

== Religious significance ==
Kanakagiri is an important Jain pilgrimage centre in Karnataka. Its historical importance is particularly well documented by its inscriptions. The 916–917 CE record of a Jain basadi, the evidence for multiple basadis, and the 1117 CE grant to the Jain pontiff Meghacandra-Siddhanta-deva establish Kanakagiri as a significant Jain religious and institutional centre by the 10th–12th centuries.

== Athishaya Mahotsava 2017 ==
The Jain committee had organised the Athishaya Mahothsava at Kanakagiri from January 16 to 5 February 2017. The first Mahamastakabhisheka and Sarvadharma Samavesha of 18-feet statue of Bahubali was performed on Feb, 2017.

== Gallery ==
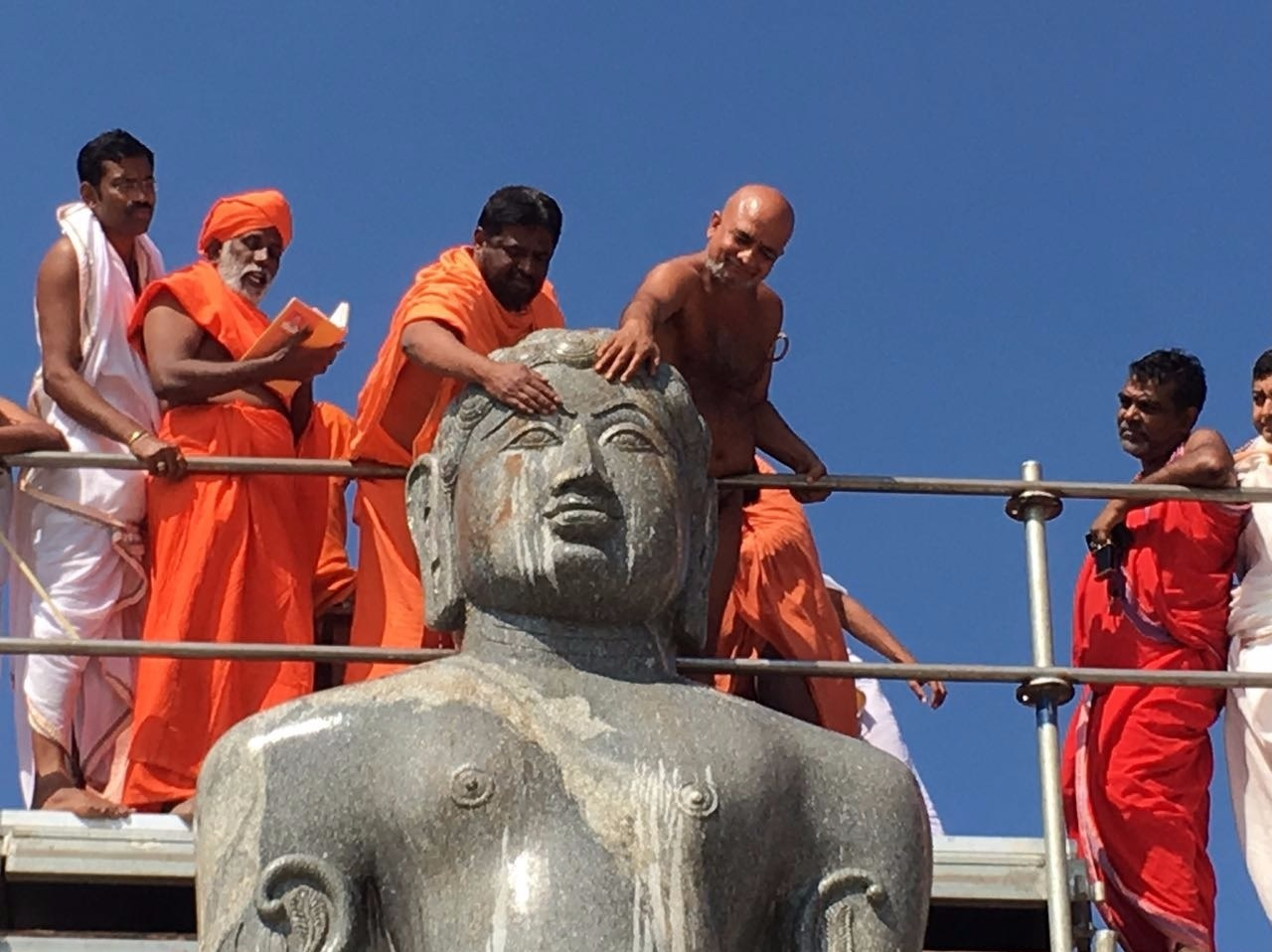
Mahamastakabhisheka of 18-feet statue of Bahubali

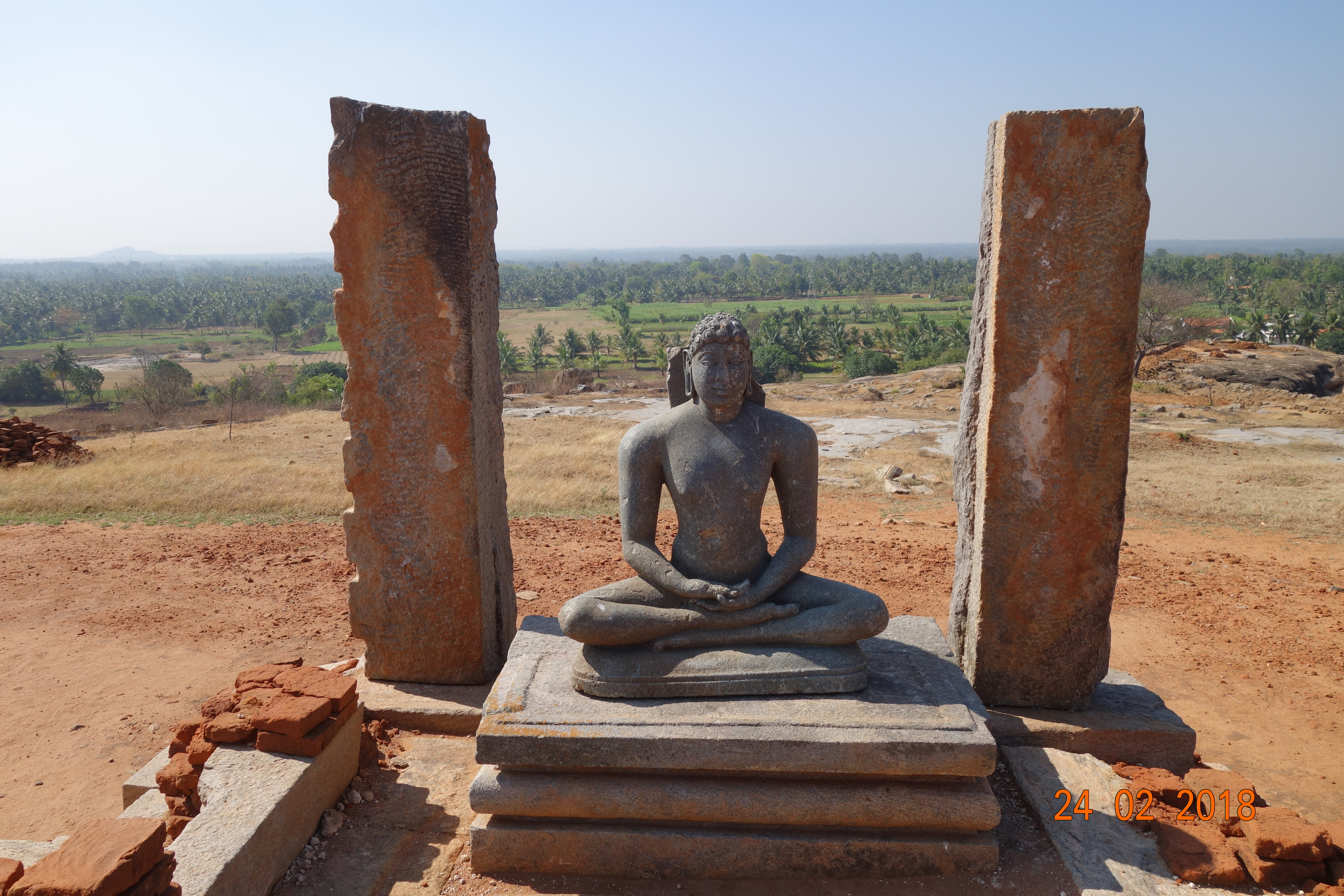
Adinath Idol in Old temple ruins

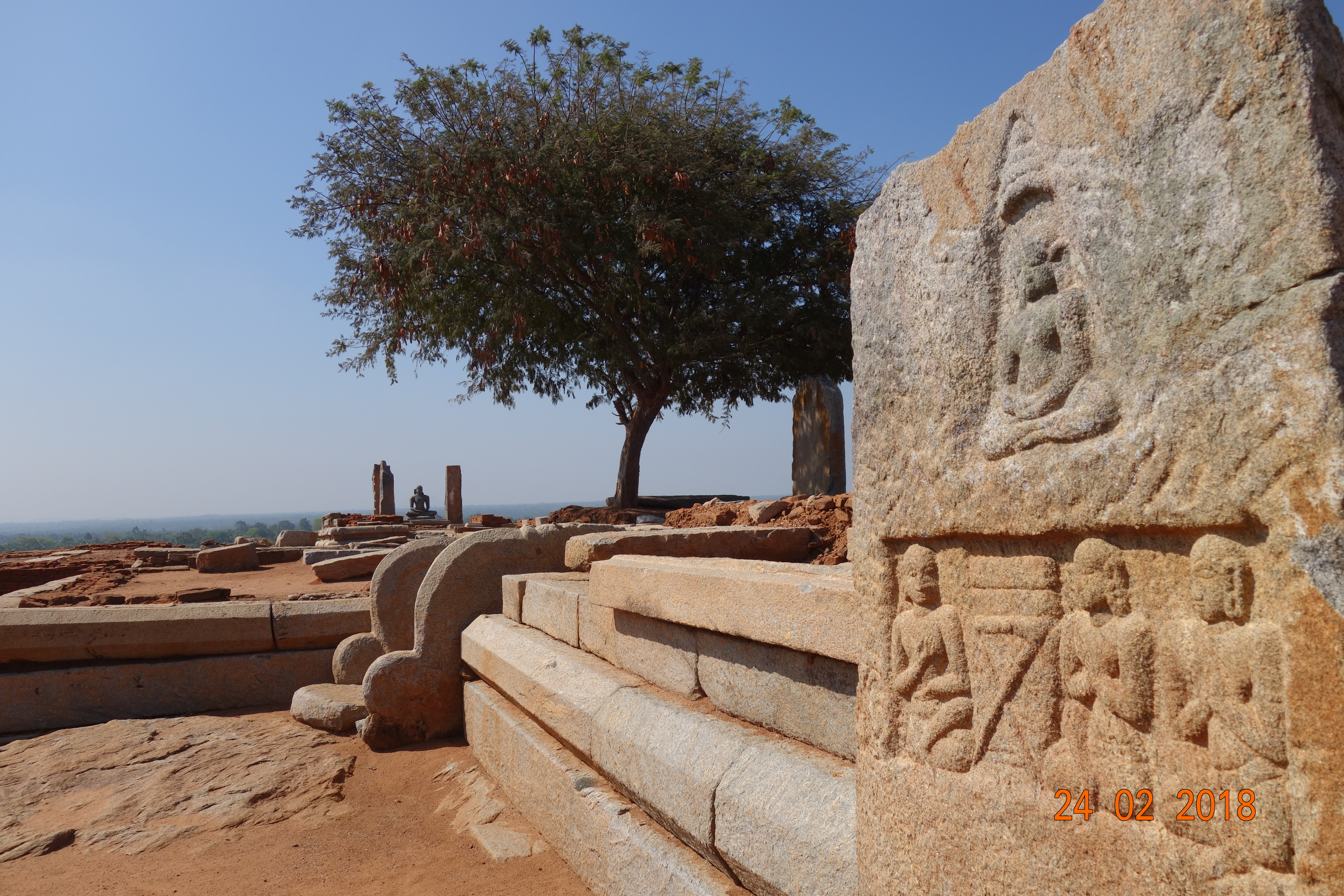
Old temple ruins

== Nearby places ==
There are many Jain temples nearby. Mainly temples are:

- Adinatha Swamy Basadi, Maleyuru
- Adinatha Basadi at Harave, Hunsur.

== See also ==
- Jainism in Karnataka
- List of Jain temples

== Sources ==
- "Chamarajanagar District Website". chamrajnagar.nic.in.
- Charya, S V Upendra (2019), The Issues That Made Newsi, Notion Press, ISBN 978-168466752-9
- Chugh, Lalit (2017), Karnataka's Rich Heritage – Temple Sculptures & Dancing Apsaras: An Amalgam of Hindu Mythology, Natyasastra and Silpasastra, Notion Press, ISBN 978-194713736-3
- Jaganathan, Rijutha (21 October 2014). "Jain heritage at Kanakagiri". Deccan Herald.
- Jain, Vijay K. (2018), Ācārya Umāsvāmī's Tattvārthasūtra – With Explanation in English from Ācārya Pūjyapāda's Sarvārthasiddhi, Vikalp Printers, ISBN 978-819327262-6
- "Kanakagiri Mahotsava". Deccan Herald. 13 January 2017.
- Singh, N. K.; Mishra, A. P. (2007), Encyclopaedia of Oriental Philosophy, vol. 7, Global Vision Pub House, ISBN 978-818220113-2
- Sastri, B. S. (1997). "Jina Pārśva and his Temples in Inscriptions of Karnataka". Jain Journal. 32 (2): 90–92.
