= Vijayanarayana Temple, Gundlupet =

Vijayanarayana Temple
- Hindu temple
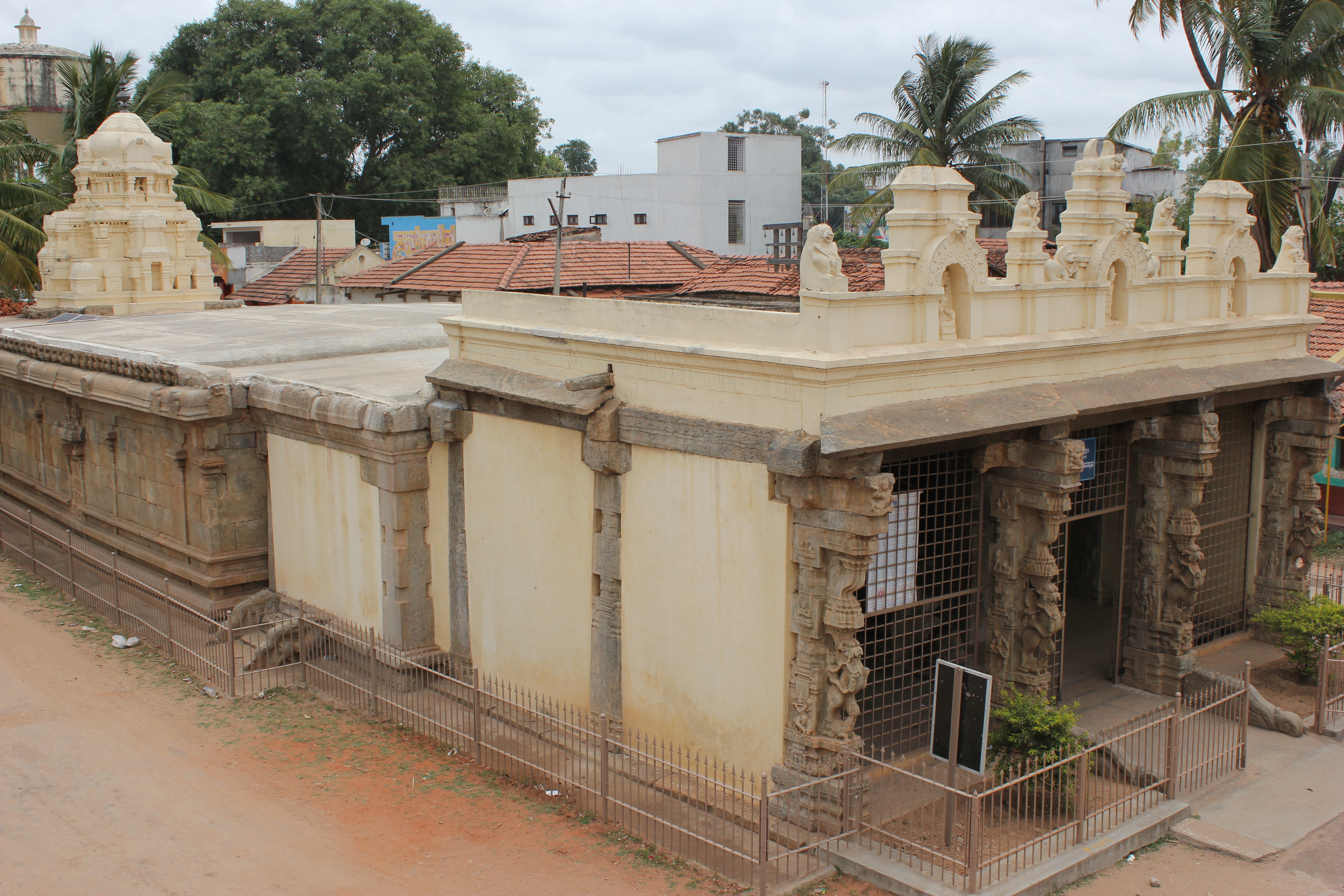
- View of Vijayanarayana temple (10th century A.D.)
- Interactive map of Vijayanarayana Temple
- Coordinates: 11°48′30″N 76°41′22″E
- Country: India
- State: Karnataka
- District: Chamarajanagar District

Languages
  - Official: Kannada
- Time zone: UTC+5:30 (IST)
- ISO 3166 code: IN-KA

The Vijayanarayana Temple is located in the town of Gundlupet of Chamarajanagar district, Karnataka state, India. The temple dates back to the 10th century rule of the Western Ganga Dynasty, though it has received continuous patronage from later kingdoms as well, up to the 15th century Vijayanagara period. Tradition has it that the Hoysala Empire King Vishnuvardhana was responsible for the consecration of the deity Vijayanarayana, a version of the Hindu god Narayana (or Vishnu).

== Temple plan ==
The temple consists of a sanctum (garbhagriha), a vestibule (called sukhanasi) that connects the sanctum to the navaranga (closed hall where devotees gather for prayers) and an open hall (mandapa). The base on which the walls of the navaranga are built (called adhisthana) has the several moldings. The walls that rise from this have slender decorative pilasters. The open mantapa that has several ornate pillars appears to have modified the original north–south entrances that existed in the navaranga (also called mukhamantapa). The entrance to temple has an impressive row of yali pillars that depict warriors riding lions. The temple has numerous independent sculptures including Anantha, Garuda, and Hanuman, the monkey god from the Hindu epic Ramayana.

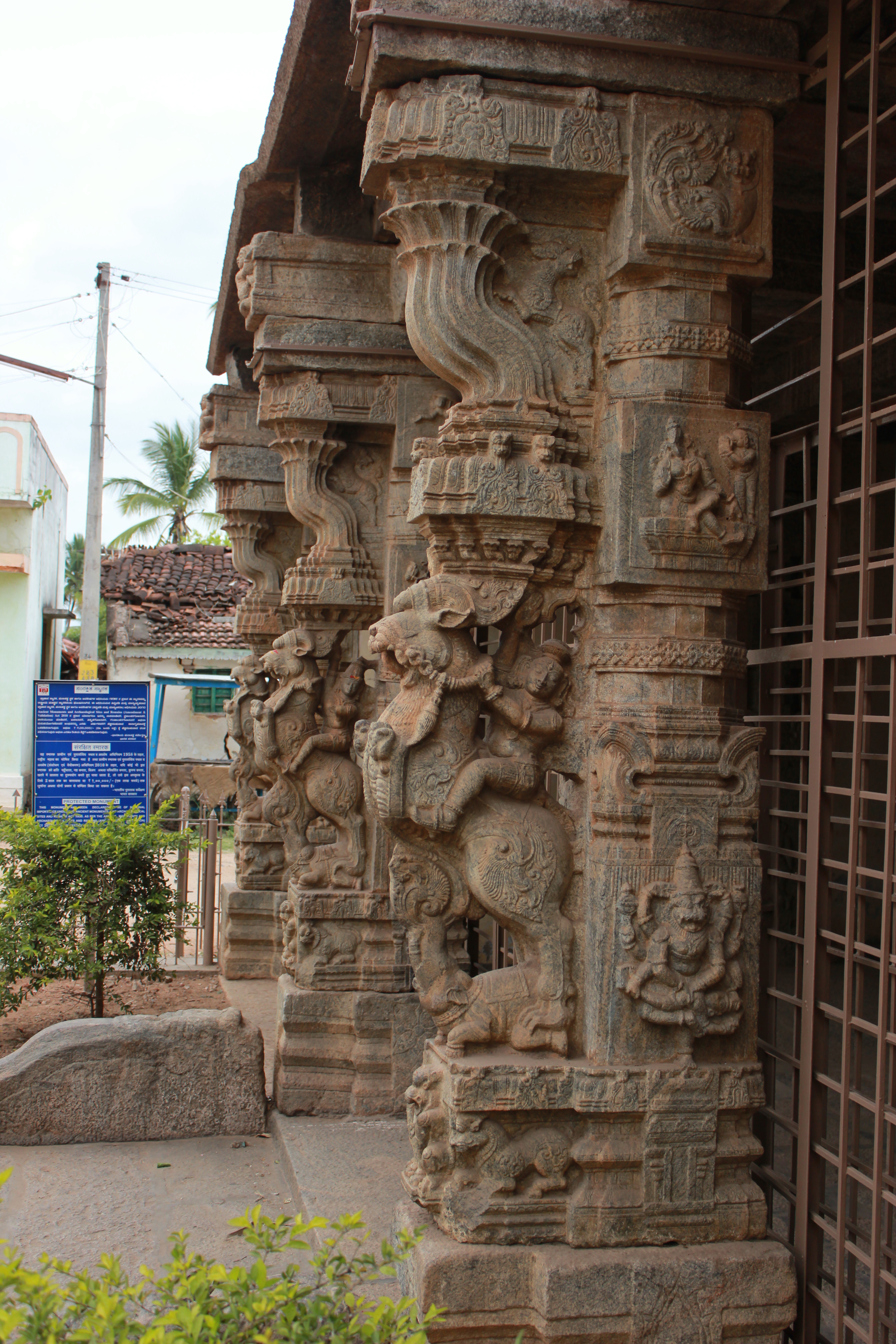
Yali pillared entrance to Vijayanarayana temple
