= Gundlupet =

Gundlupete Gundlupete
- Town
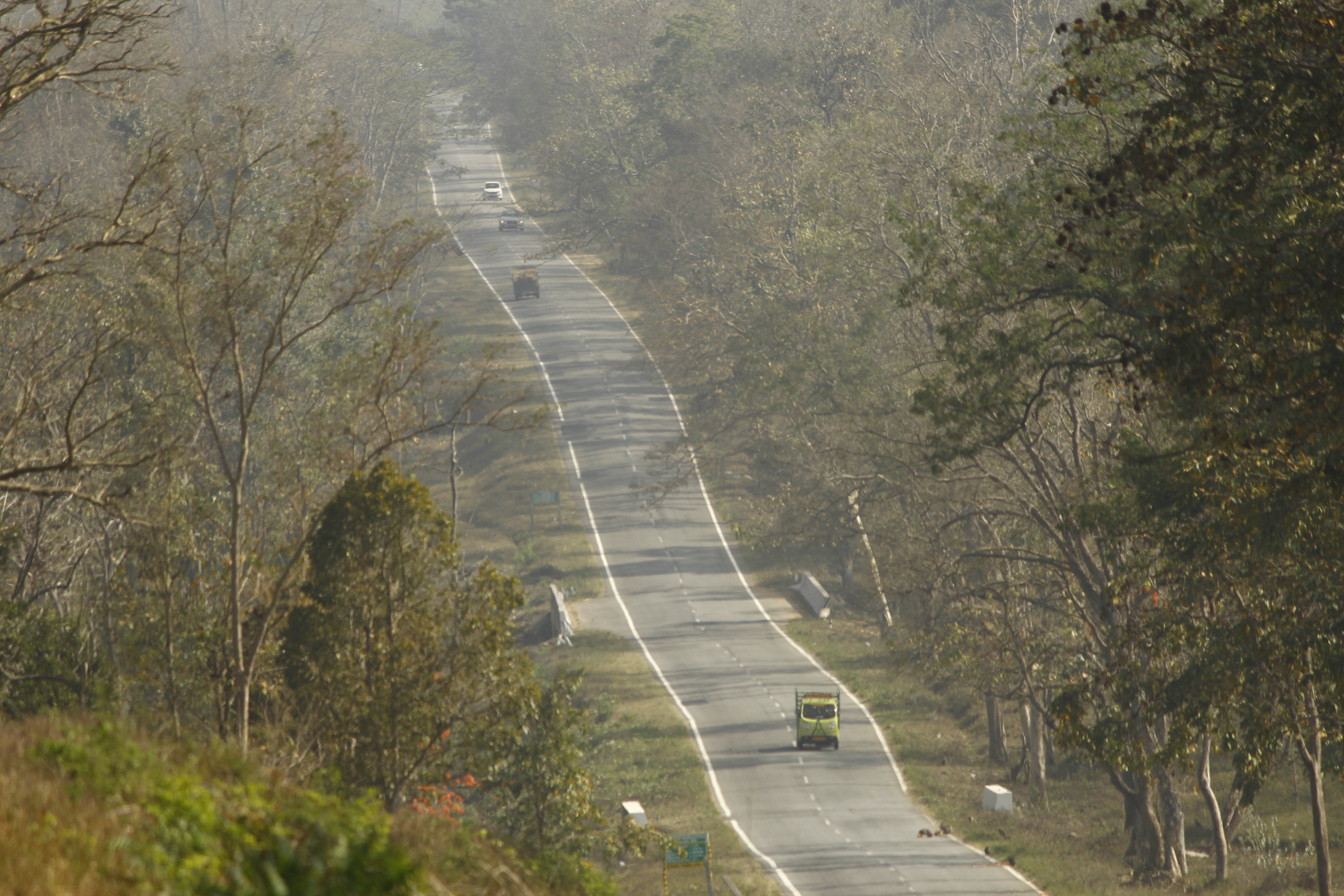
- Gundlupete - Ooty road

- Location in Karnataka, India
- Coordinates: 11.8°N 76.68°E
- Country: India
- State: Karnataka
- District: Chamarajanagar

Government
  - Type: Gundlupet Town Municipal Council (TMC)
  - Body: Municipality

Area
  - Total: 12.56 km^{2} (4.85 sq mi)
- Elevation: 816 m (2,677 ft)

Population (2011)
  - Total: 28,105
  - Density: 2,238/km^{2} (5,796/sq mi)

Languages
  - Official: Kannada
- Time zone: UTC+5:30 (IST)
- PIN: 571111
- Telephone code: 08229
- Vehicle registration: KA-10
- Website: www.gundlupettown.gov.in

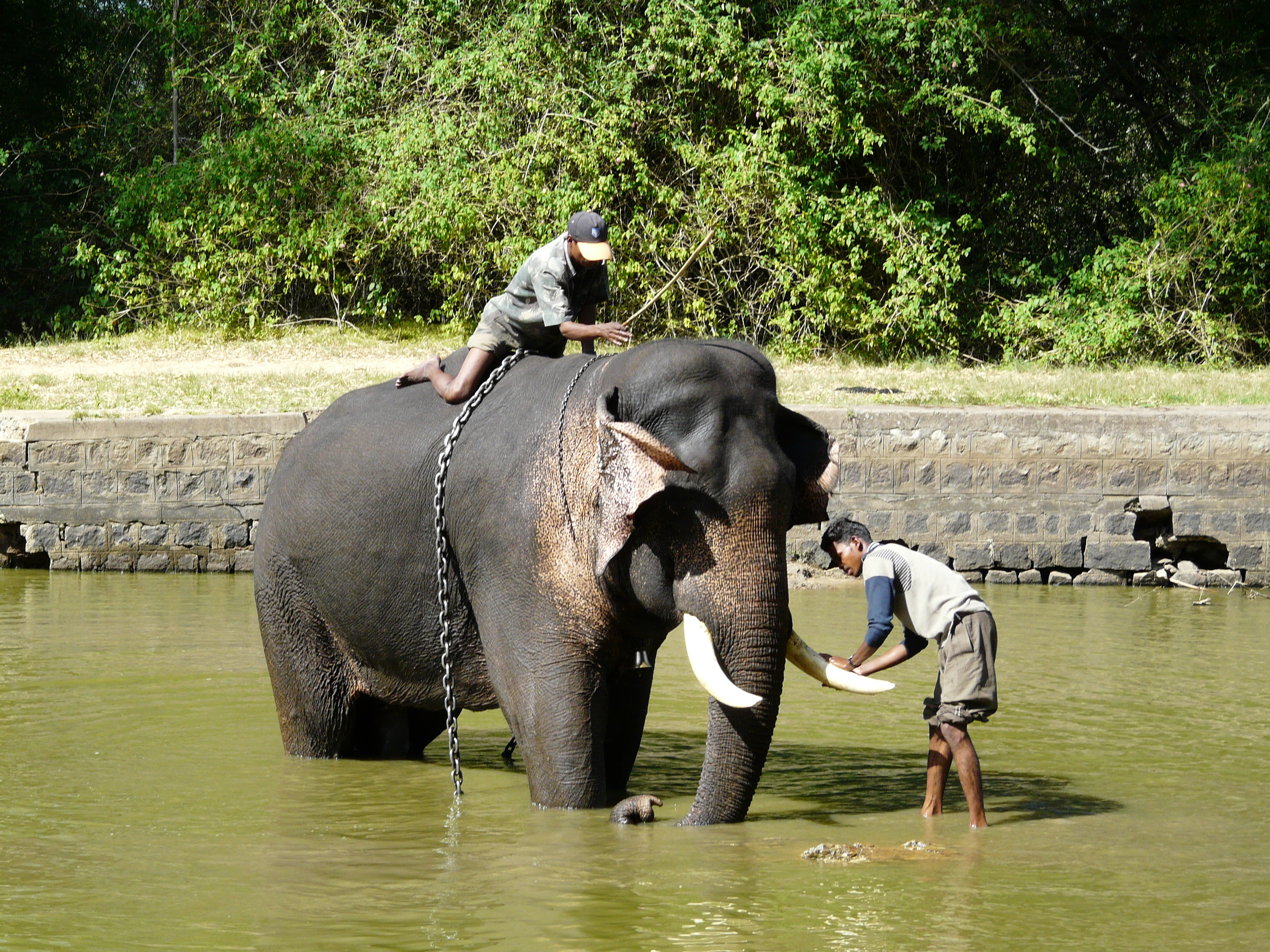
Elephant Camp

Gundlupet (Gundlupētē in Kannada) is a municipal town situated in the Chamarajanagar district of Karnataka, India.

It is also known as "The flower pot of India". It is situated on NH 766, 60 km away from Mysuru and approximately 200 km from the state administrative capital, Bengaluru. Gundlupet is the last town in Karnataka on the National Highway 766 which goes through Mysore, Ooty, Wayanad, and Kozhikode. It is situated very close to the Tamil Nadu and Kerala state borders. NH 181 begins from Gundlupet and ends in Nagapattinam in Tamil Nadu via Ooty and Coimbatore.

The Bandipur National Park is situated 17 km away from Gundlupet, giving the town the epithet also known as "Land of Tigers". Gundlupet was previously known as Vijayapura, named after the ancient Vijayanarayana Temple.

== Geography ==
Gundlupet is located at 11.8°N 76.68°E. It has an average elevation of 816 metres (2,677 feet).

== Demographics ==
=== Population by religion - Gundlupet Taluka ===
Religion	Total		Male	Female
Hindu	214,896	(96.34%)	106,989	107,907
Muslim	6,754	(3.03%)	3,412	3,342
Christian	492	(0.22%)	246	246
Sikh	27	(0.01%)	14	13
Buddhist	107	(0.05%)	55	52
Jain	225	(0.1%)	118	107
Other Religion	16	(0.01%)	9	7
No Religion Specified	553	(0.25%)	266	287

== Climate ==
It is a fairly dry region on the rain-shadow side of the Western Ghats, with an average annual rainfall of about 60 cm.

== Image gallery ==
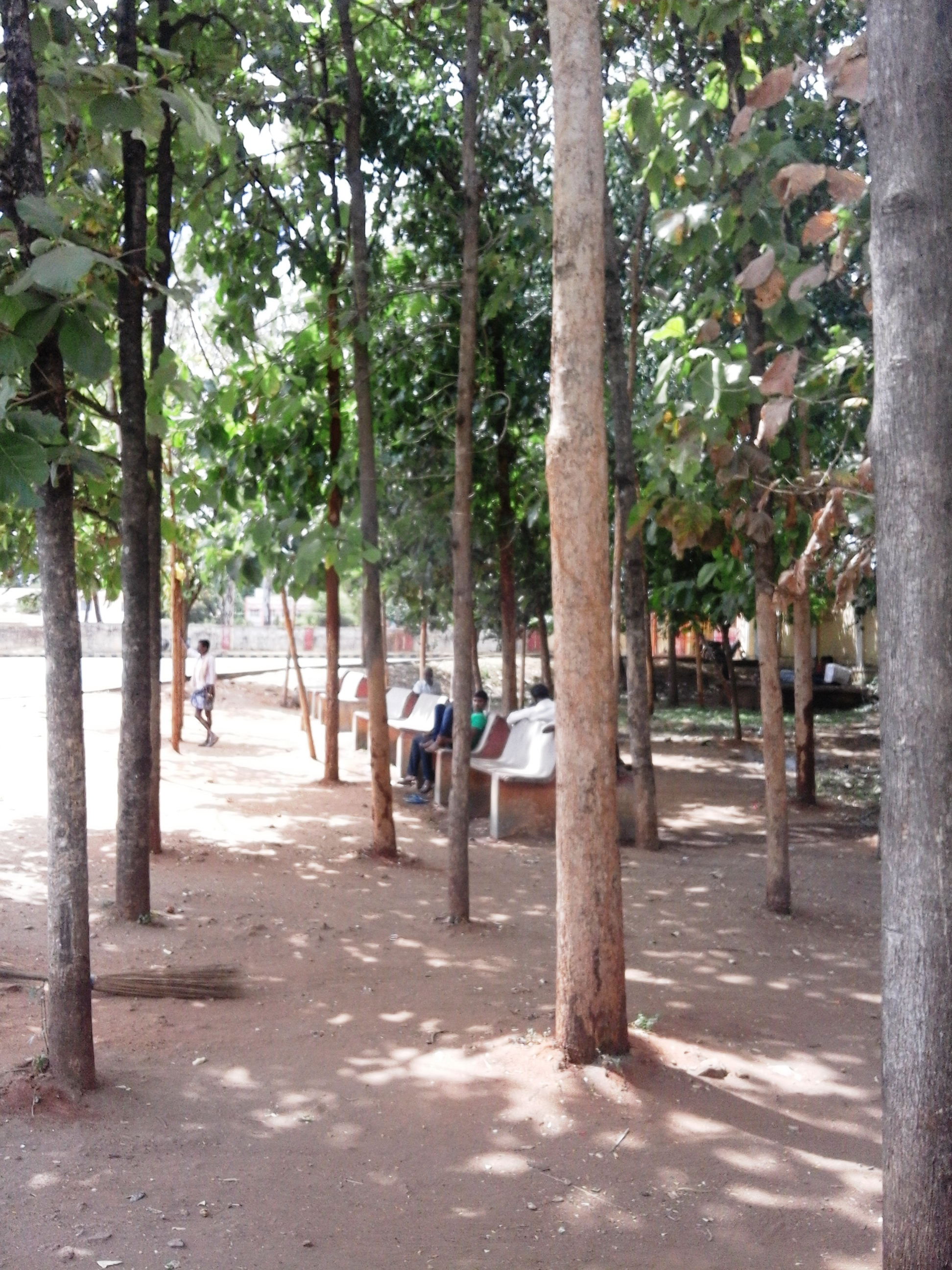
Bus Station

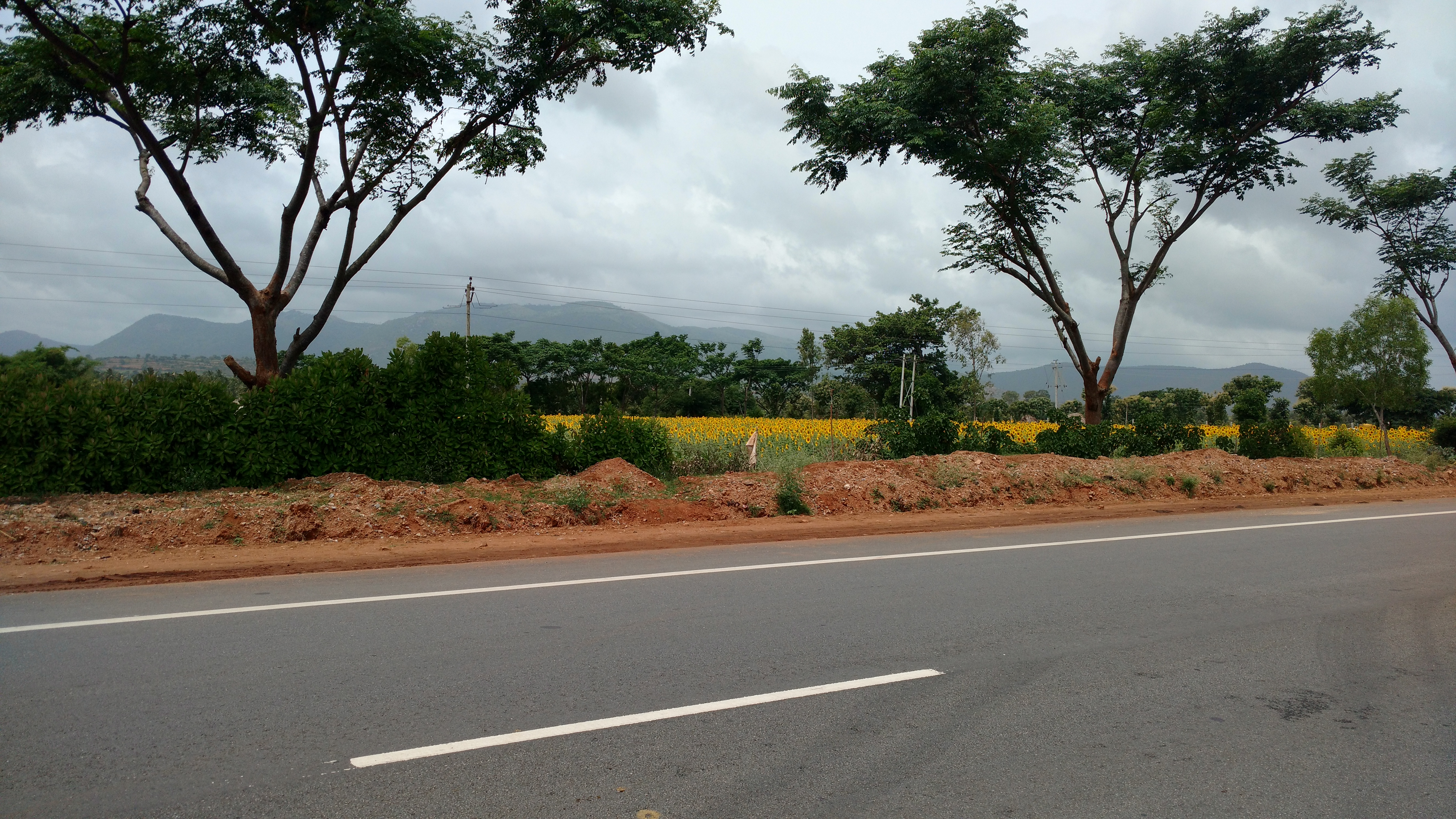
NH 766 view from Gundalpet to Wayanad

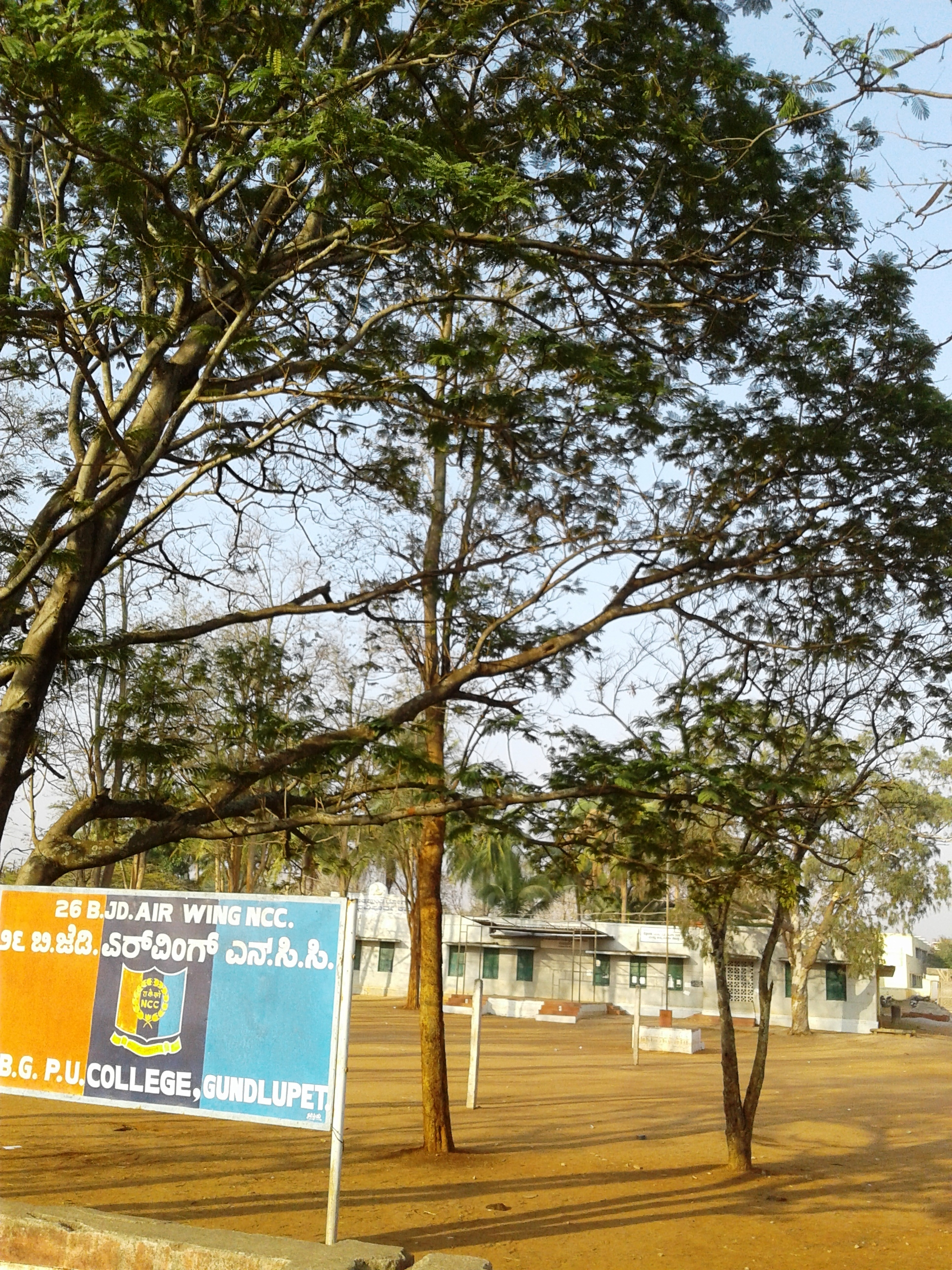
D.B.G.C

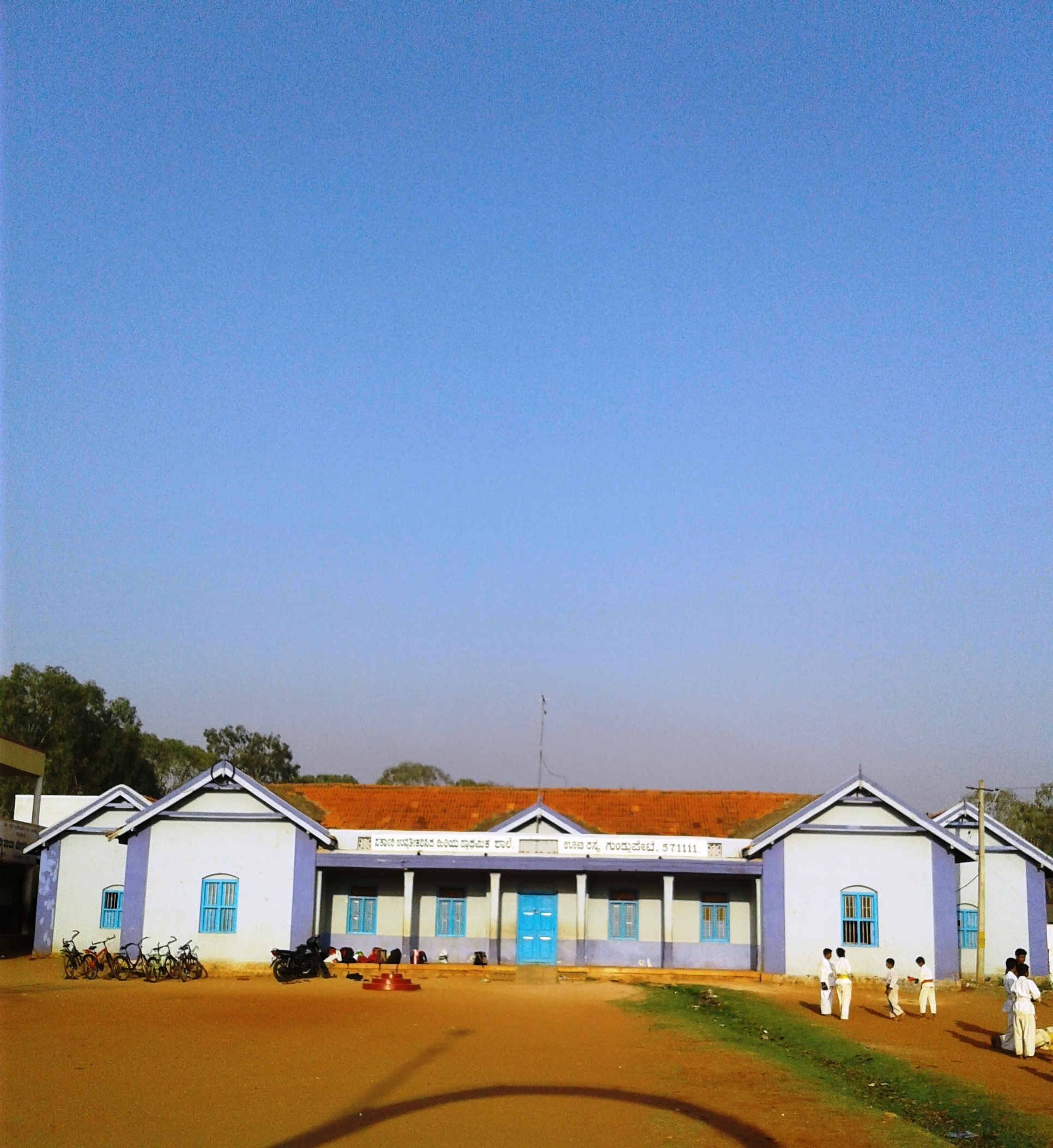
Karate School

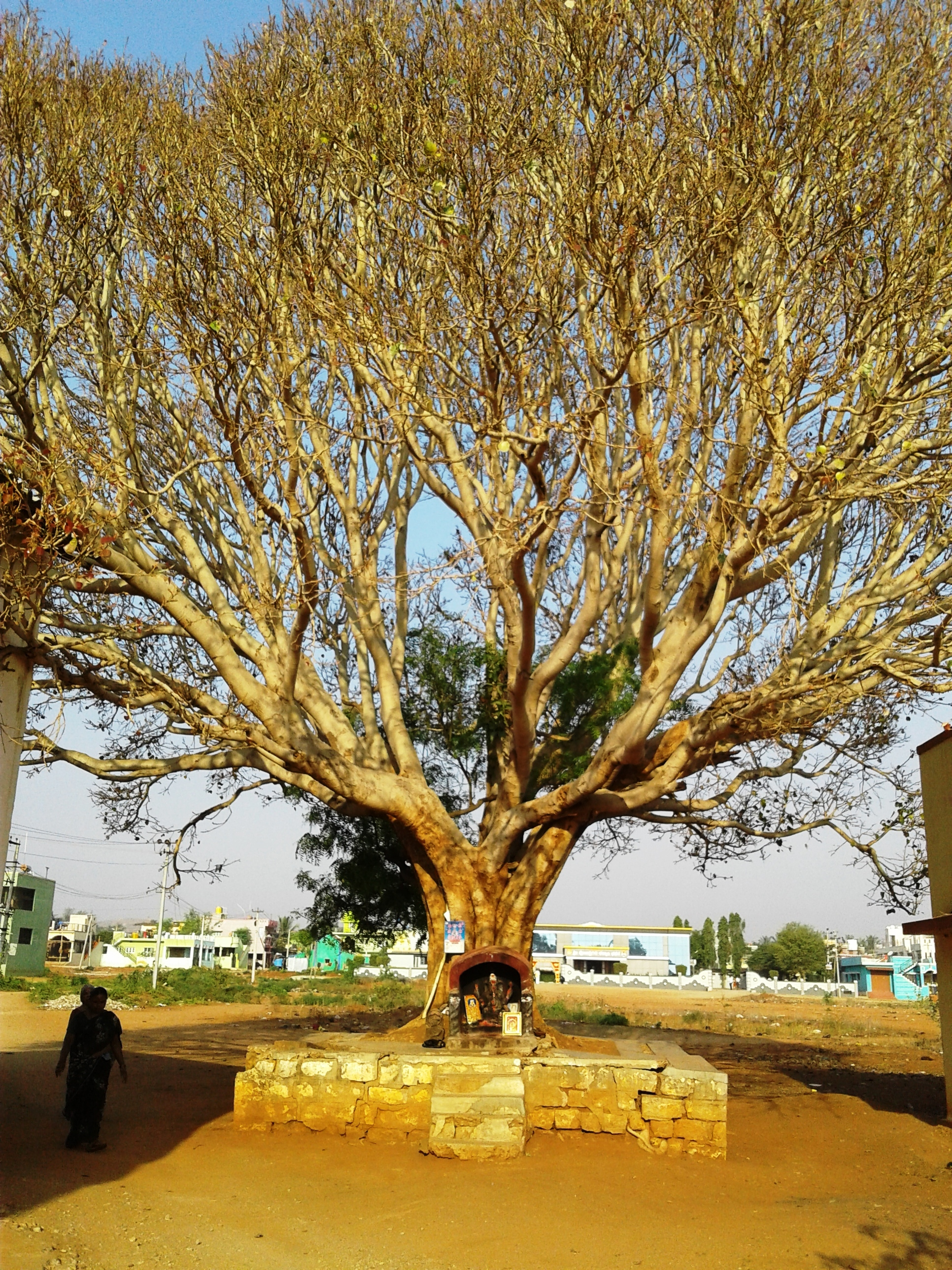
Tree Worship

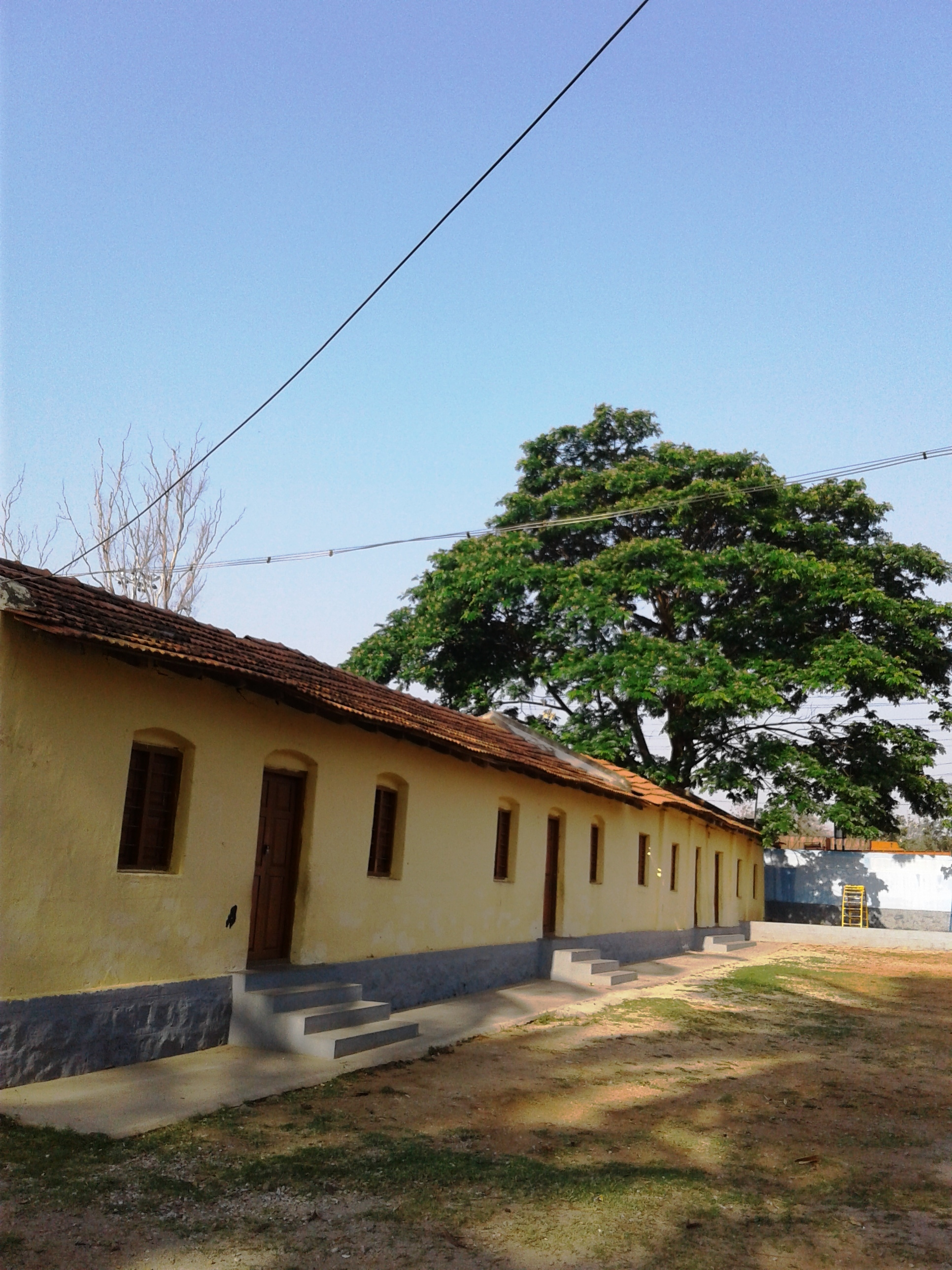
St.Johns School

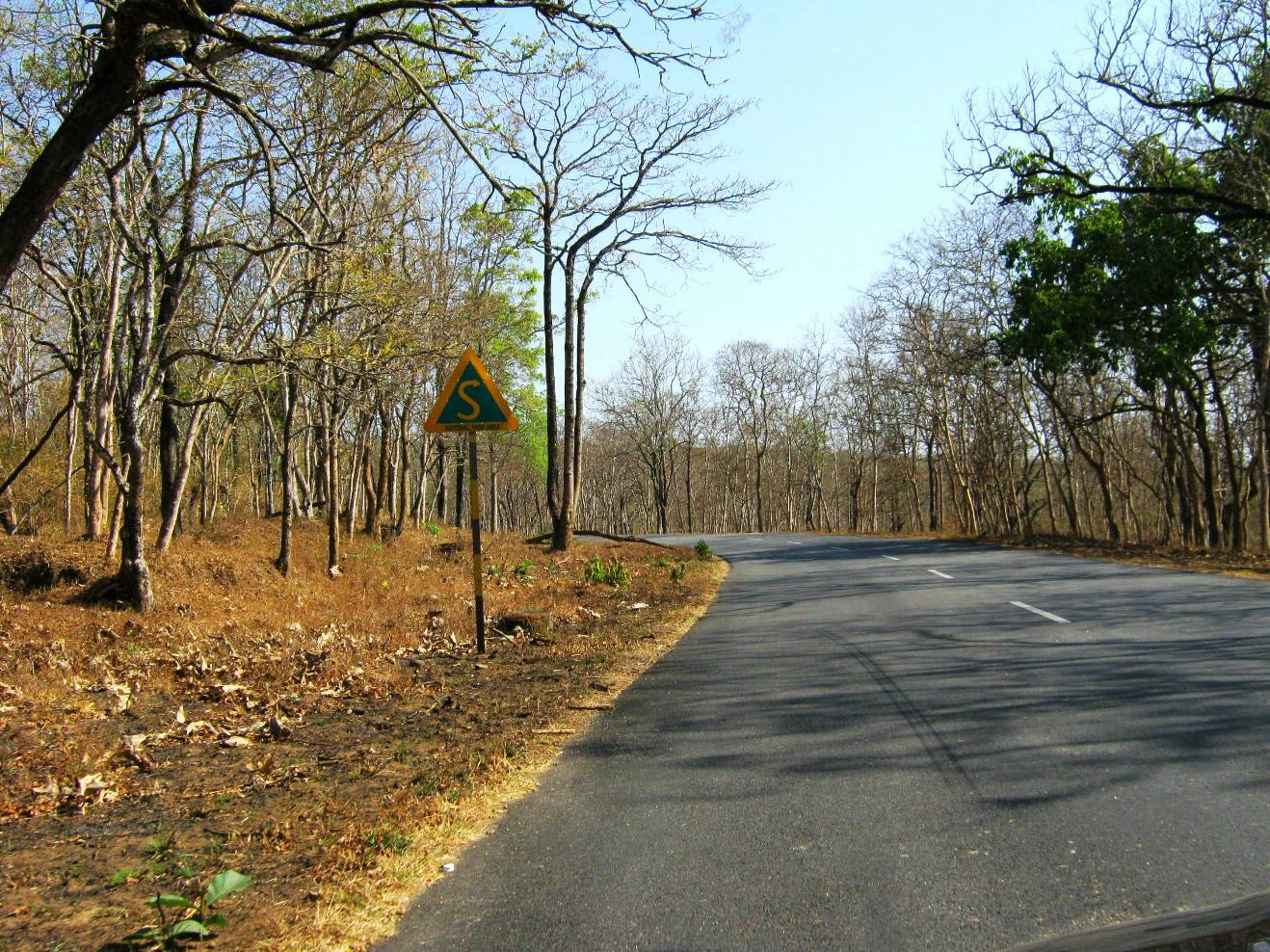
Bandipur Tiger Reserve

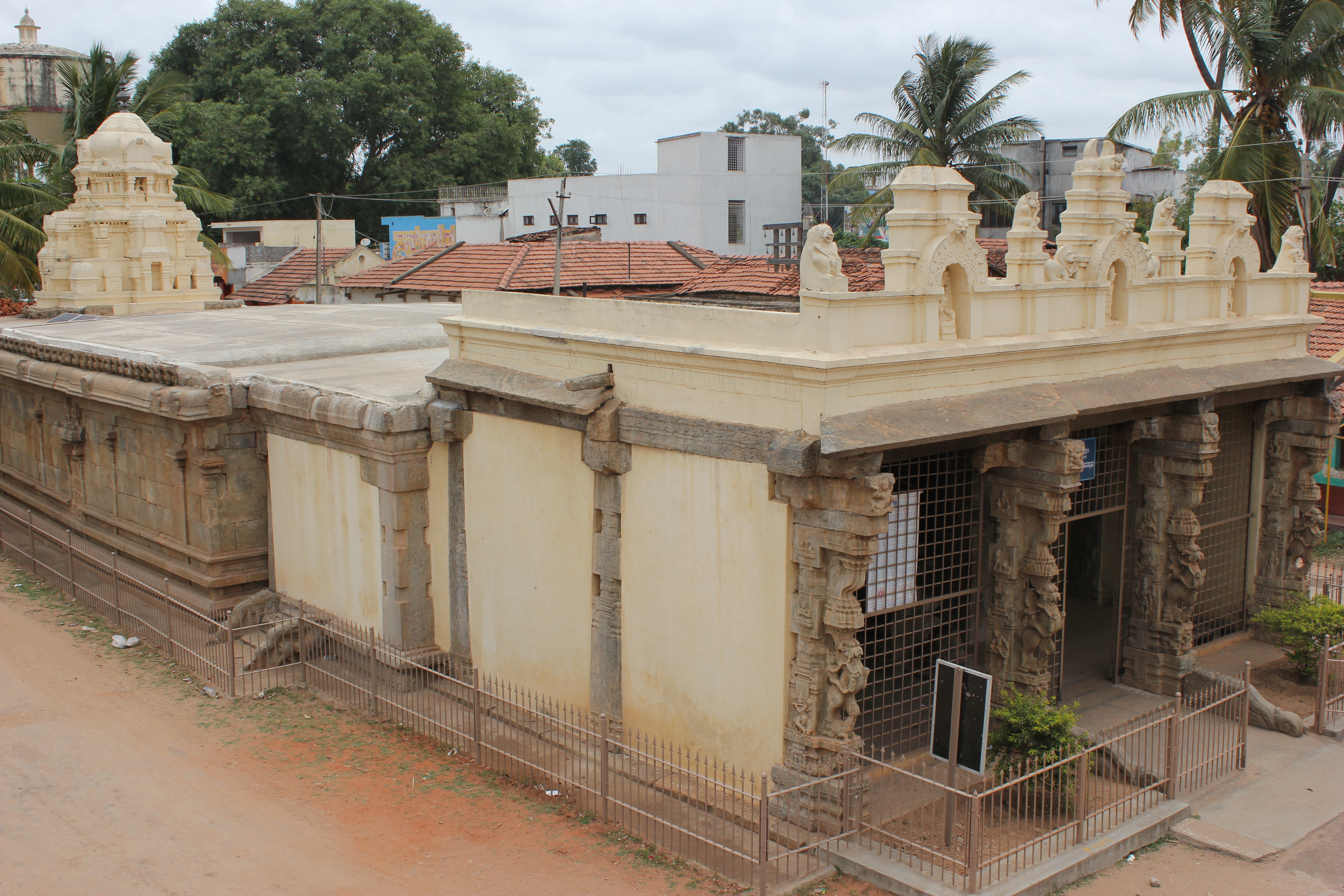
Vijayanarayana Swamy temple

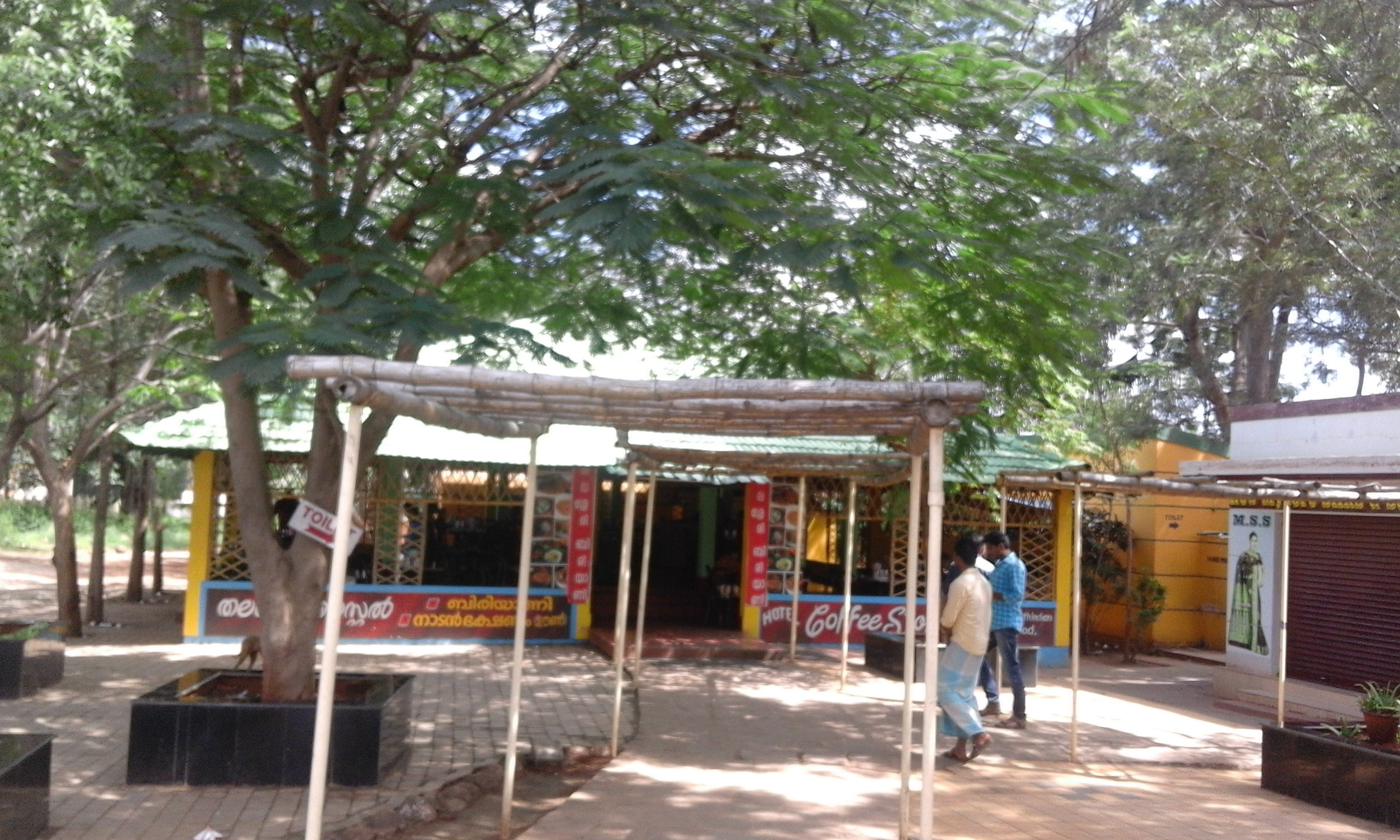

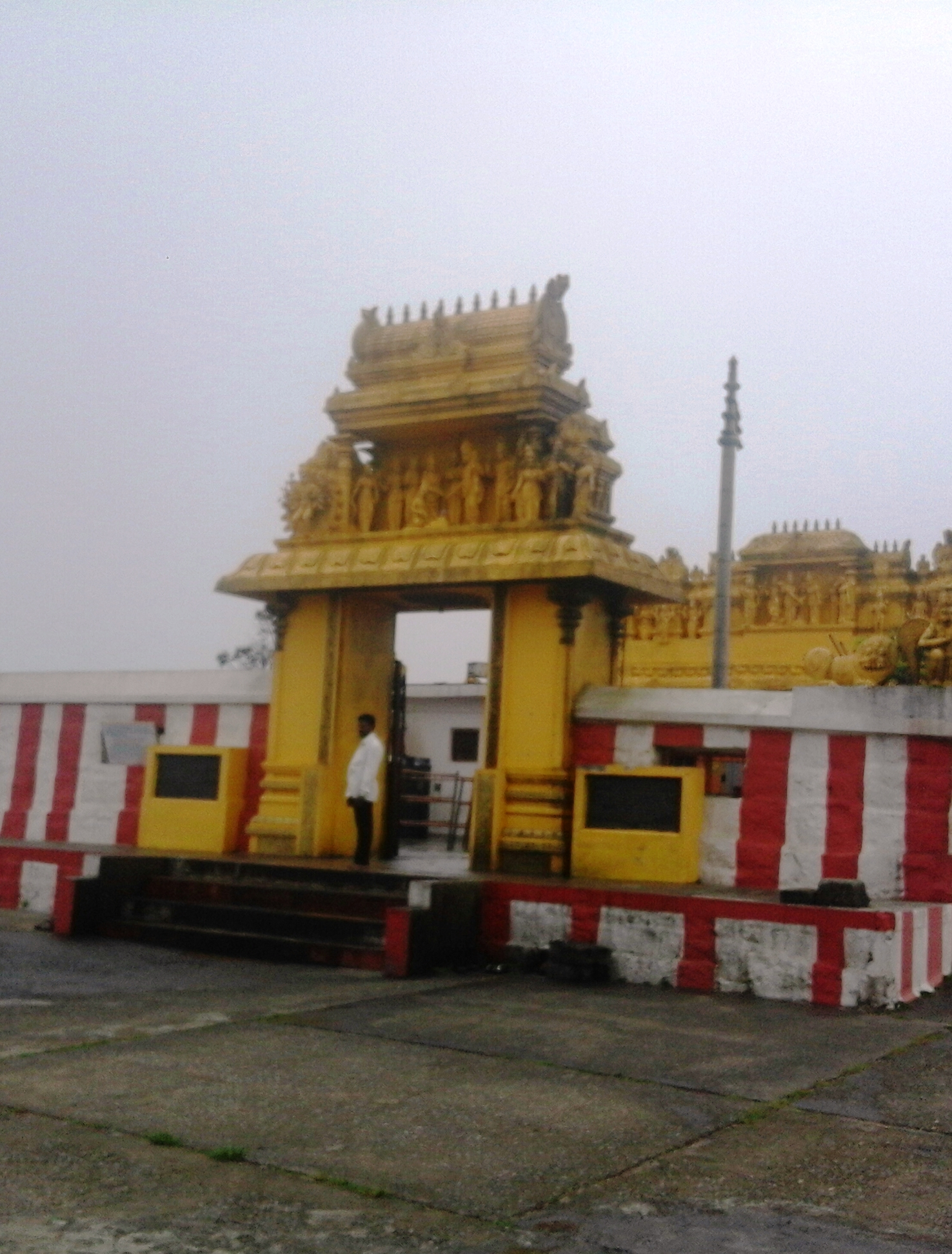
