= Malligawad =

Malligawad ಮಲ್ಲಿಗವಾಡ
- Village
- Location in Karnataka, India
- Coordinates: 15.3374°N 75.43571°E
- Country: India
- State: Karnataka
- District: Dharwad
- Taluk: Annigeri

Government
  - Type: Panchayat raj
  - Body: Gram panchayat
- Elevation: 738 m (2,421 ft)

Population (2011)
  - Total: 2,062

Languages
  - Official: Kannada
- Time zone: UTC+5:30 (IST)
- PIN: 581195
- ISO 3166 code: IN-KA
- Vehicle registration: KA-25
- Website: karnataka.gov.in

Malligawad is a village in Annigeri taluk of Dharwad district in the Indian state of Karnataka.

== Geography ==
Malligawad is located at 15.3374°N 75.43571°E in Annigeri taluk of Dharwad district. The village is situated approximately 32 km from Hubli.

== Temples and Culture ==
The village is known for the 12th-century Shri Someshwara Temple, believed to be built by the legendary sculptor Jakanachari. An annual fair is held on Chaitra Purnima, attracting thousands of devotees. Other religious sites include Hanuman Temple, Mahasati Temple, Durgadevi Temple, Goni Basaveshwara Temple, Mahamayi Temple, Shivananda Math, two mosques, and one Jain temple.

== Education ==
Malligawad has a Government Higher Primary School serving classes 1 to 8 and two Anganwadi centres for early childhood care.

== Economy ==
Agriculture is the main occupation. Major crops include green gram, groundnut, cotton, chilli, Bengal gram, jowar, and wheat.

== Transport ==
Bus facilities connect Malligawad to Hubballi, Annigeri, and Shirahatti.
