= Abdul Khader Nadakattin =

Indian grassroots agricultural innovator, social worker and environmentalist

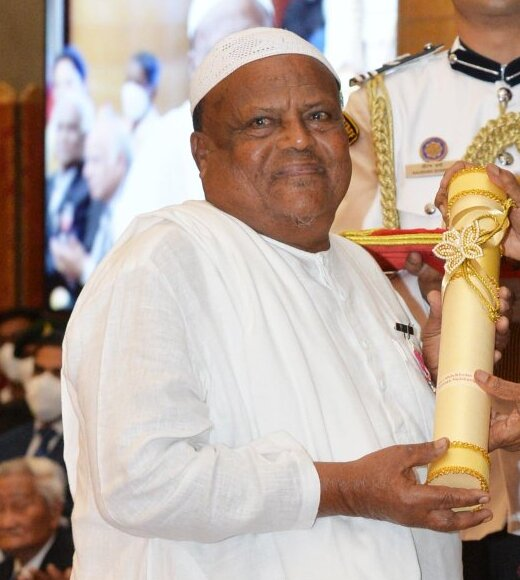
- Nadakattin in 2022
- Born: 1953 (age 71–72); Annigeri, Dharwad district, Karnataka, India
- Occupations: Grassroots agricultural innovator, social worker, and environmentalist
- Years active: c. 1970s – present
- Known for: Developing over 40 agricultural innovations for small and marginal farmers
- Notable work: Tamarind seed-separation device; seed-cum-fertiliser drill; water-heating boiler; sugarcane sowing driller; wheel tiller
- Awards: Padma Shri (2022)

Abdulkhader Imamsab Nadakattin (born 1953) is an Indian grassroots agricultural innovator, social worker and environmentalist from Dharwad, Karnataka. He is credited with more than 40 innovations that assist small and marginal farmers. His notable innovations include a tamarind seed separation device, a ploughing blade making machine, a seed cum fertiliser drill, a water-heating boiler, an automatic sugarcane sowing driller and a wheel tiller. In 2022 the Government of India awarded him the Padma Shri for his contributions in the field of grassroots innovation.

== Early life and education ==
Abdul Khader Nadakattin was born in 1953 in the town of Annigeri, located in the Dharwad district in the state of Karnataka, India. Abdul was the only son of a wealthy farmer and had his formal education only up to the Standard X, he wanted to continue his studies but his father insisted that he discontinue his formal education and turn to agricultural activities.

=== First innovation ===
Nadakattin's first invention was a "Water Alarm" which he developed while still studying in school. He developed this device to help get up from bed early in the morning - he used to sleep late into the early hours of the morning. He tied a thin rope knotted to the end of the alarm key in a timepiece to a bottle of water in such a way that after the ringing of the alarm, water would fall on his face.

=== Innovations related to tamarind ===
Abdul Khadar Nadakattin had inherited about 60 acres of land from his father. The land was dry, rain was unpredictable and groundwater very scarce. Abdul Khadar Nadakattin decided to try alternatives to traditional practices. He started planting seedlings of mango trees, sapota trees and ber trees with chilli as an intercrop in a part of his land. Due to lack of sufficient water, the idea failed miserably as the seedlings dried out and died. Nadakattin did not give up and turned to planting tamarind trees in large numbers. He observed that the tamarind trees can survive even in severely dry conditions. This turned out to be a turning point in his life. With much difficulty he could plant around 1600 tamarind plants and with proper care all of them survived. Inspired by the success of this experiment, Nadakattin planted 1,100 more tamarind plants. Growing tamarind with scarce but alkaline water was an innovation in itself.

Enthused by the initial success, Nadakattin took a series of steps to expand and strengthen his practices. He dug ponds to harvest rain water, constructed underground tanks to preserve tamarind pulp and began manufacturing value added products from tamarind such as pickle and jam. These products were marketed even in cities like Hyderabad. But he soon realized that the production of these value added products was labor intensive and so he conceived the idea of inventing machines which would help reduce dependence on human labor. This led to the development of several devices that could help processing of tamarind. One of the first such devices was one to separate tamarind seeds. The device had a system wherein due to the sliding action of the pegs that were tapered at the end, the seed gets thrown out of the tamarind pod. Another invention was a device for slicing tamarind intended for making pickles. Due to his craze for tamarind related work, local people even named him as hunase huccha, which means "tamarind maniac".

=== Other innovations ===
The many other innovations spearheaded by Nadakattin include:

- A new kind of bullock drawn tiller capable of deep ploughing
- A machine for sharpening a tractor harrow blade
- A machine for sowing seeds of different sizes ensuring proper spacing
- A Water-heating boiler: It could heat enough water for bathing 20 people by using five kg of wood chips in about ten minutes. The device can keep the water hot for nearly 24 hours.
- An automatic sugarcane sowing driller

=== Establishment of a company ===
In 1975, Nadakattin established a company named the Vishwashanthi Agricultural Research and Industrial Research Centre in Annigeri, Dharwad in order to manufacture and market the agricultural equipment developed by him.

== Recognitions ==
- In the year 2022, The Government of India awarded the Padma Shri, the third highest award in the Padma series of awards, to Abdul Khader Nadakattin for his distinguished service in the field of grass root innovation. The award is in recognition of his service as a "Grassroots agricultural innovator from Dharwad, credited with over 40 innovations that assist small and marginal farmers across India."
- The Lifetime Achievement Award during the National Innovation Foundation-India’s 8th National Grassroots Innovation and Outstanding Traditional Knowledge Awards (2015)

== See also ==
- Padma Shri Award recipients in the year 2022
