= Kusugal railway station =

Railway station in Karnataka

Kusugal

General information
- Location: Kusugal, Dharwad district, Karnatak; India
- Coordinates: 15°23′32″N 75°14′01″E
- Elevation: 637 metres (2,090 ft)
- System: Indian Railways station
- Owner: Indian Railways
- Operator: South Western Railway zone
- Line: Guntakal–Vasco da Gama line
- Platforms: 2
- Tracks: Double Electric-Line

Construction
- Structure type: Standard (on ground)

Other information
- Status: Functioning
- Station code: KUG
- Zone(s): South Western Railway zone
- Division(s): Hubballi

Services
Preceding station	Indian Railways	Following station
Hebsur towards ?	South Western Railway zone Guntakal–Vasco da Gama section	Hubballi Junction towards ?
Location
- Interactive map

Kusugal railway station is a railway station located on the Guntakal–Vasco da Gama line operated by the South Western Railway zone under Hubballi railway division. It is situated at Kusugal in Dharwad district in the Indian state of Karnatak.
