= Annigeri railway station =

Railway station in Karnataka, India

Annigeri

General information
- Location: Annigeri, Dharwad district, Karnatak; India
- Coordinates: 15°25′56″N 75°25′51″E
- Elevation: 635 metres (2,083 ft)
- System: Indian Railways station
- Owner: Indian Railways
- Operator: South Western Railway zone
- Line: Guntakal–Vasco da Gama line
- Platforms: 2
- Tracks: Double Electric-Line

Construction
- Structure type: Standard (on ground)

Other information
- Status: Functioning
- Station code: NGR
- Zone(s): South Western Railway zone
- Division(s): Hubballi

Services
Preceding station	Indian Railways	Following station
Hulkoti towards ?	South Western Railway zone Guntakal–Vasco da Gama section	Navalgund Road towards ?
Location
- Interactive map

Annigeri railway station is a railway station located on the Guntakal–Vasco da Gama line operated by the South Western Railway zone under Hubballi railway division. It is situated at Annigeri in Dharwad district in the Indian state of Karnatak.
