= Kusugal =

- village
- Nickname: Bet kusugal
- Location in Karnataka, India Kusugal (India)
- Coordinates: 15°22′N 75°13′E
- Country: India
- State: Karnataka
- District: Dharwad
- Talukas: Hubli

Government
  - Type: Panchayat raj
  - Body: Gram panchayat
  - Rank: 1

Population (2011)
  - Total: 9,825

Languages
  - Official: Kannada
- Time zone: UTC+5:30 (IST)
- ISO 3166 code: IN-KA
- Vehicle registration: KA
- Website: karnataka.gov.in

Kusugal is a village in the southern state of Karnataka, India. It is located in the Hubballi taluka of Dharwad district of Karnataka state.

== Demographics ==
As of the 2011 Census of India there were 2,004 households in Kusugal and a total population of 9,825 consisting of 4,970 males and 4,855 females. There were 1,284 children ages 0-6. The majority of the population is Hindu, with the next largest group being Muslim, along with a few Jain families.

== Transportation ==
Nearest railway connection is Kusugal railway station located on the Guntakal–Vasco da Gama line.

== Schools ==
1. Noorandappa Chennappa Muttagi Kannad Gandu Makkal Shale
2. Government High School
3. Hennumakkal Shale
4. Urdu School

== See also ==
- Dharwad
- Districts of Karnataka
