= Annigeri =

- Town
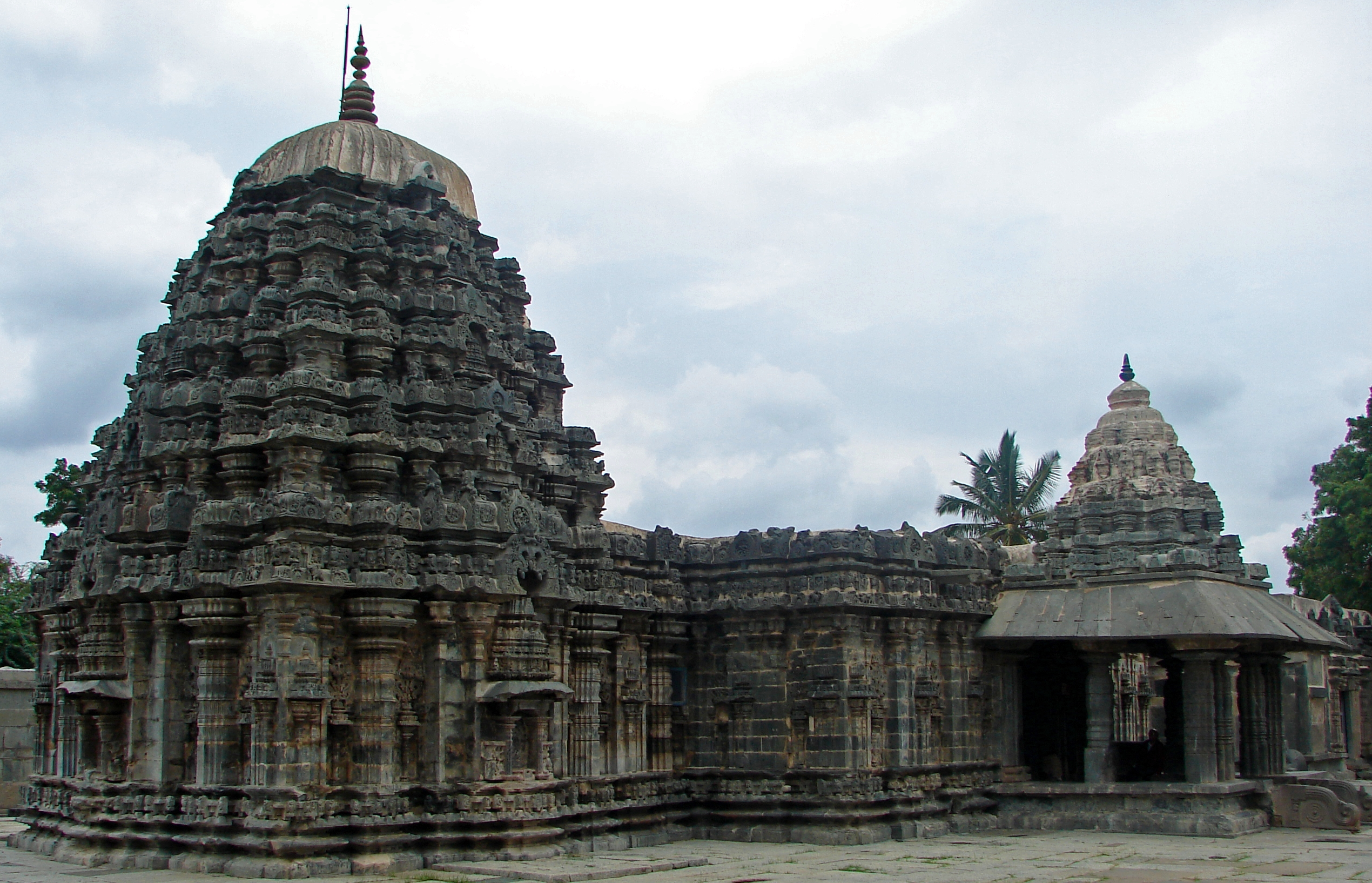
- Amruteshwara Temple at Annigeri

- Location in Karnataka, India Annigeri (Karnataka)
- Coordinates: 15.43°N 75.43°E
- Country: India
- State: Karnataka
- District: Dharwad

Area
  - Total: 11.1 km^{2} (4.3 sq mi)
- Elevation: 624 m (2,047 ft)

Population (2001)
  - Total: 25,709
  - Density: 2,316.13/km^{2} (5,998.7/sq mi)

Languages
  - Official: Kannada
- Time zone: UTC+5:30 (IST)
- PIN: 582 201
- Telephone code: 08380
- Vehicle registration: KA-25

Annigeri is a taluk of Dharwad district in the state of Karnataka, India, located 20 km west of Gadag en route to Hubli and 35 km from Hubli.

== Introduction ==
Annigeri (Kannada: ಅಣ್ಣಿಗೇರಿ)is the place of birth of the famous Kannada poet Adikavi Pampa (Kannada: ಆದಿಕವಿ ಪಂಪ). It is well known for the black stone temple built by the Western Chalukya Empire. known as Amruteshwara Temple. A temple of mythological figures supported by 76 columns, located in the Dharwad district, and has a derasar dedicated to Parshva, the 23rd Tirthankara in Jainism. Annigeri also has temples dedicated to Banashankari, Basappa, Gajina Basappa and Hanuman. There is an ancient Lingayati temple near the railway station. Annigeri has seven mosques and two Lingayati Mathas.

== History ==
Annigeri comes under core area of Western Chalukya

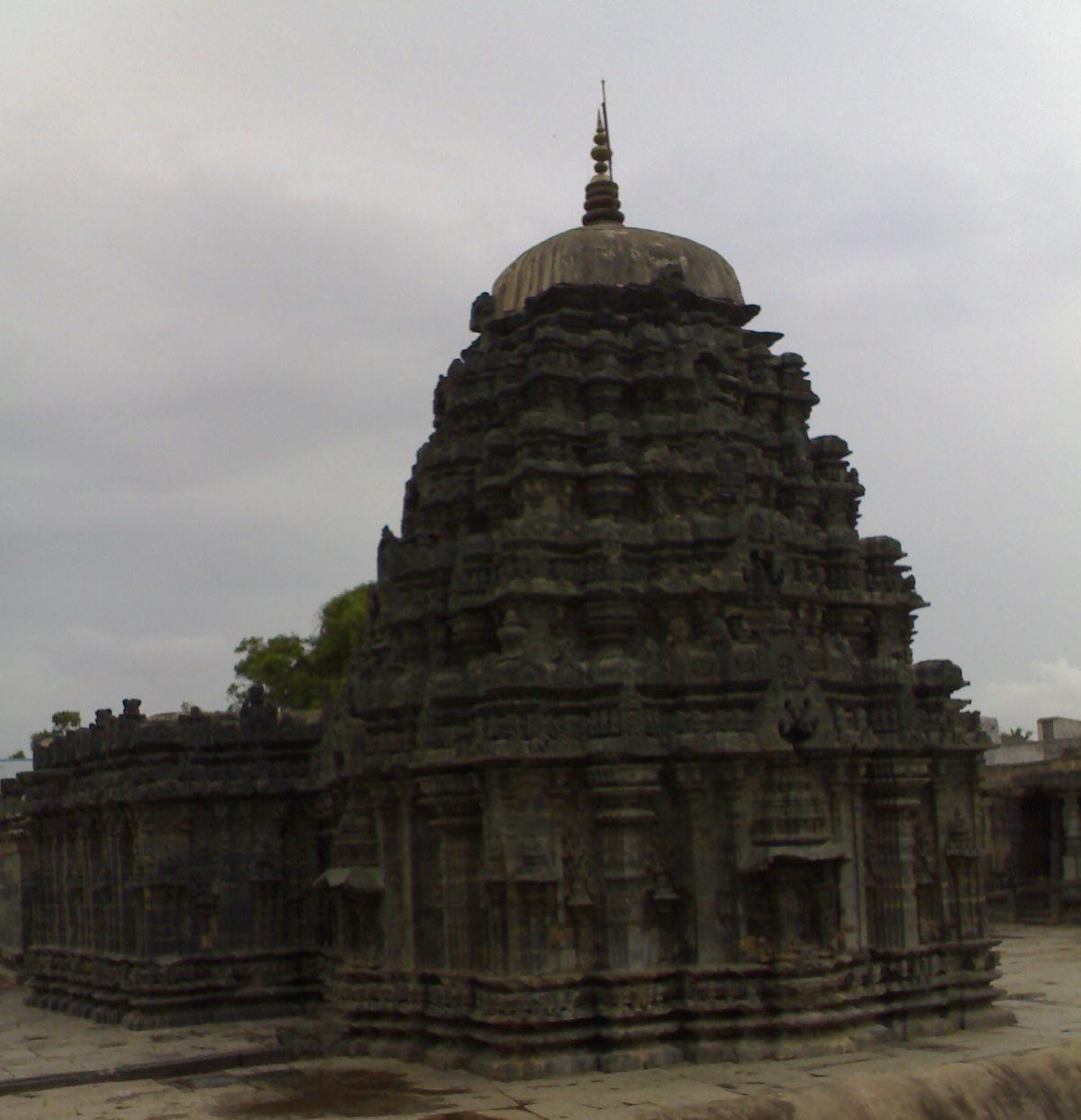
Amruteshwara Temple in Annigeri

Annigeri was an important political and cultural center in the past. Various kings like the Chalukya dynasty, Seuna Yadavas of Devagiri and the Hoysala Empire annexed the town, which once formed part of the kingdoms of the Kalachuris of Kalyanis.

Annigeri was the last capital of the Chalukyas, Someshwara 4 (during 1184-89) and it was headquarters of famous rich province of Belvola-300.

Annigeri comes under the core area of Western Chalukya architectural activity in the modern Karnataka state. The Amrtesvara Temple is the finest examples produced by the Kalyani Chalukyas (Western Chalukya architecture).

In 1157 the Kalachuris under Bijjala II captured Basavakalyan and occupied it for the next twenty years, forcing the Chalukyas to move their capital city to Annigeri in the present-day Dharwad district.

To Provide education at the primary and Vedic levels, Annigeri had five Brahmapuris.

== Annigeri skulls ==
In 2010, over 100 human skulls were found in a drain at Annigeri. According to the preliminary theories, the area may have been a mass grave around some 150–200 years ago, or it may have been a battle ground. After the discovery, the Archaeological Survey of India officials visited the site, and the government of Karnataka ordered an excavation. After the excavation, 471 skulls were found on a stretch of 15.6 by 1.7 metres (51.2 by 5.6 ft). As of 2011, the archaeologists were searching for any mention of a massacre in the local folklore or history.

== Great personalities of Annigeri ==
=== Adikavi Pampa ===
Annigeri is the birthplace of the great Kannada poet, Adikavi Pampa.

- Benjamin Loirice first wrote about Pampa and published the Pampa Bharata in 1882.
- Sri S G Narasimhachar brought out Adi Purana in 1900 and
- Kannada Sahitya Parishat published the revised edition of Pampa Bharata In 1931.
- Government of Karnataka established the Pampa Foundation at Annigeri and also

instituted Pampa award.

- The Kannada University Hampi instituted Nadoja award in memory of Pampa.

== Tourist attractions ==
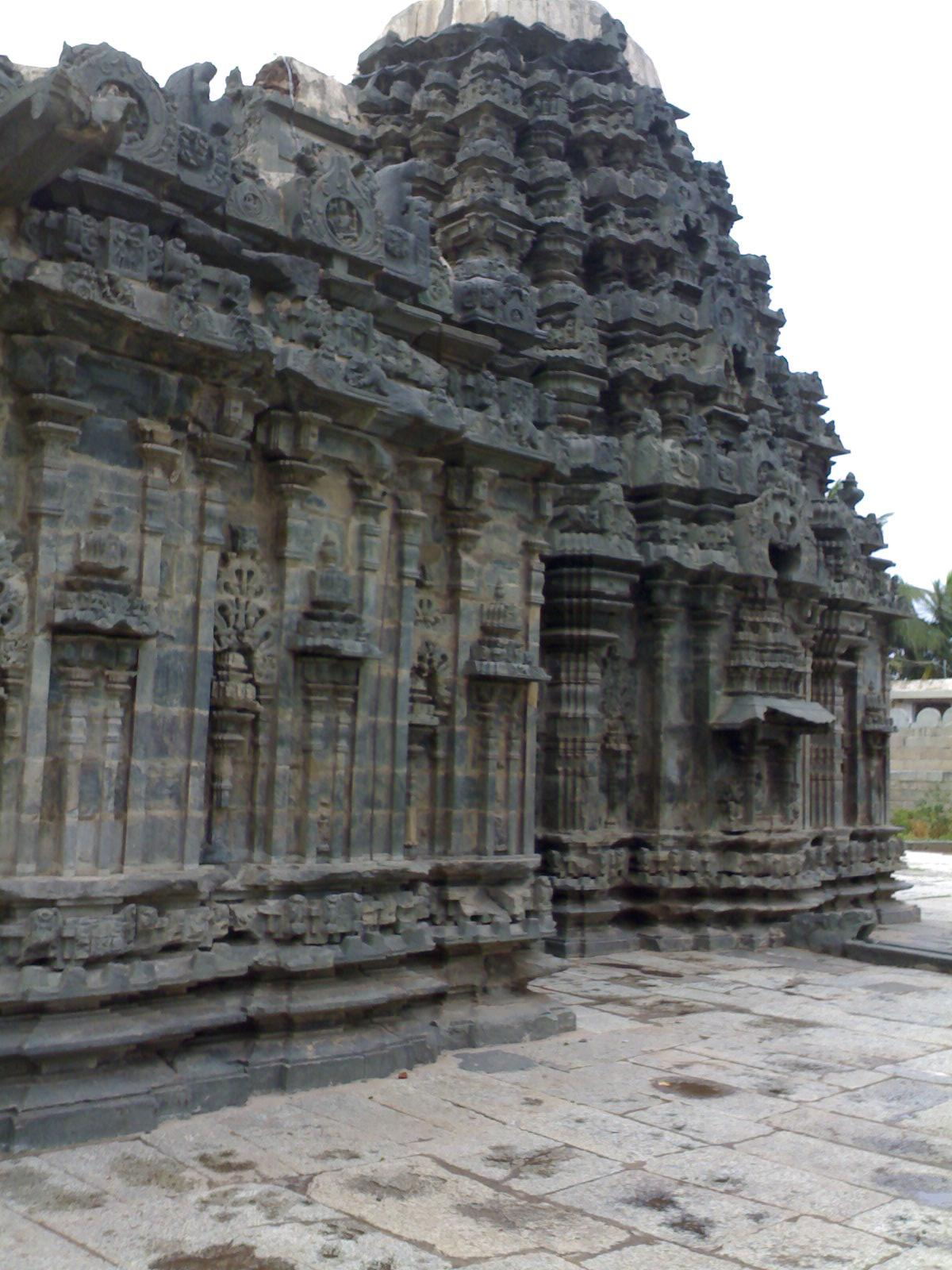
Amruteshwara Temple in Annigeri

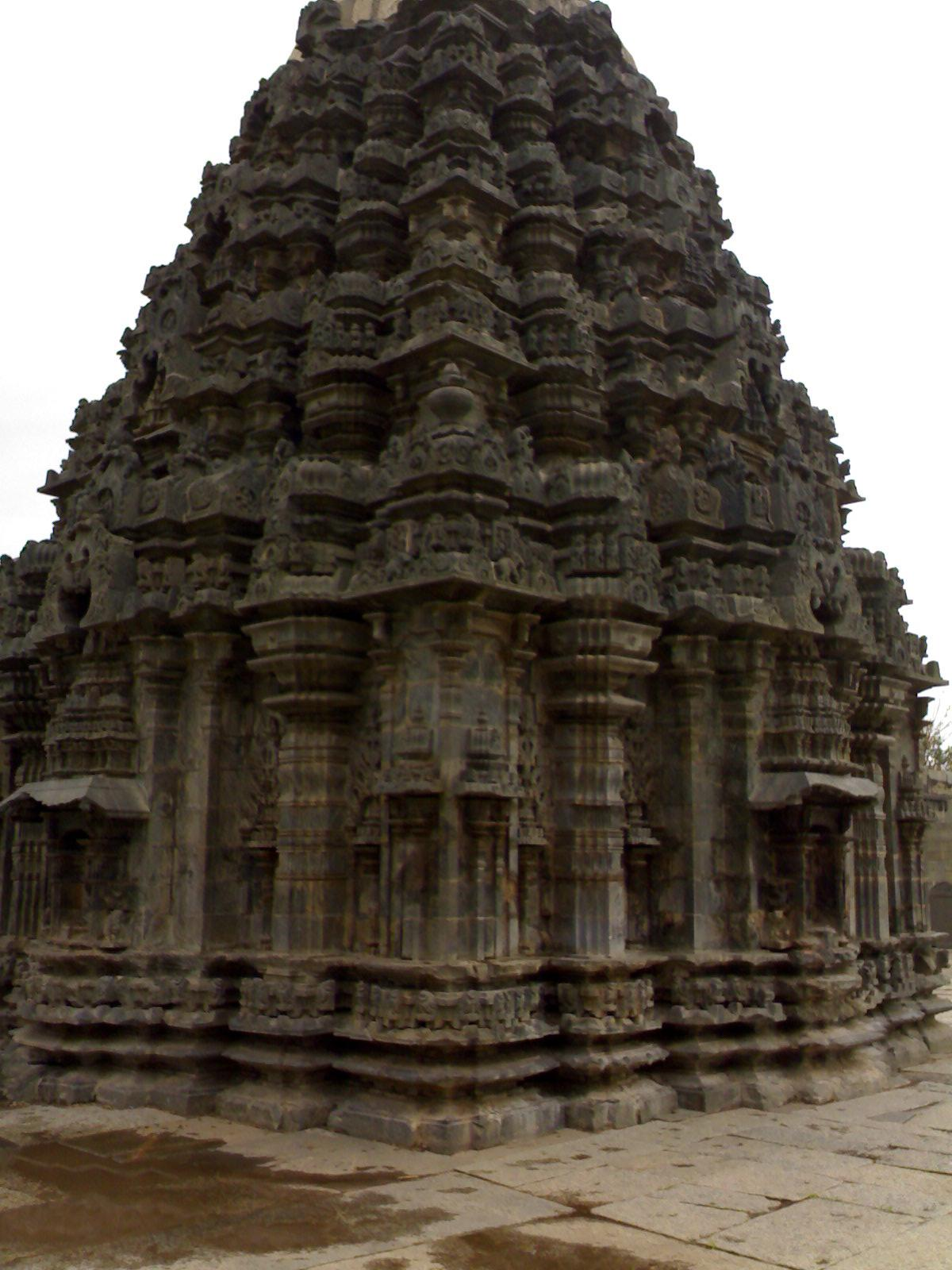
Amruteshwara Temple in Annigeri

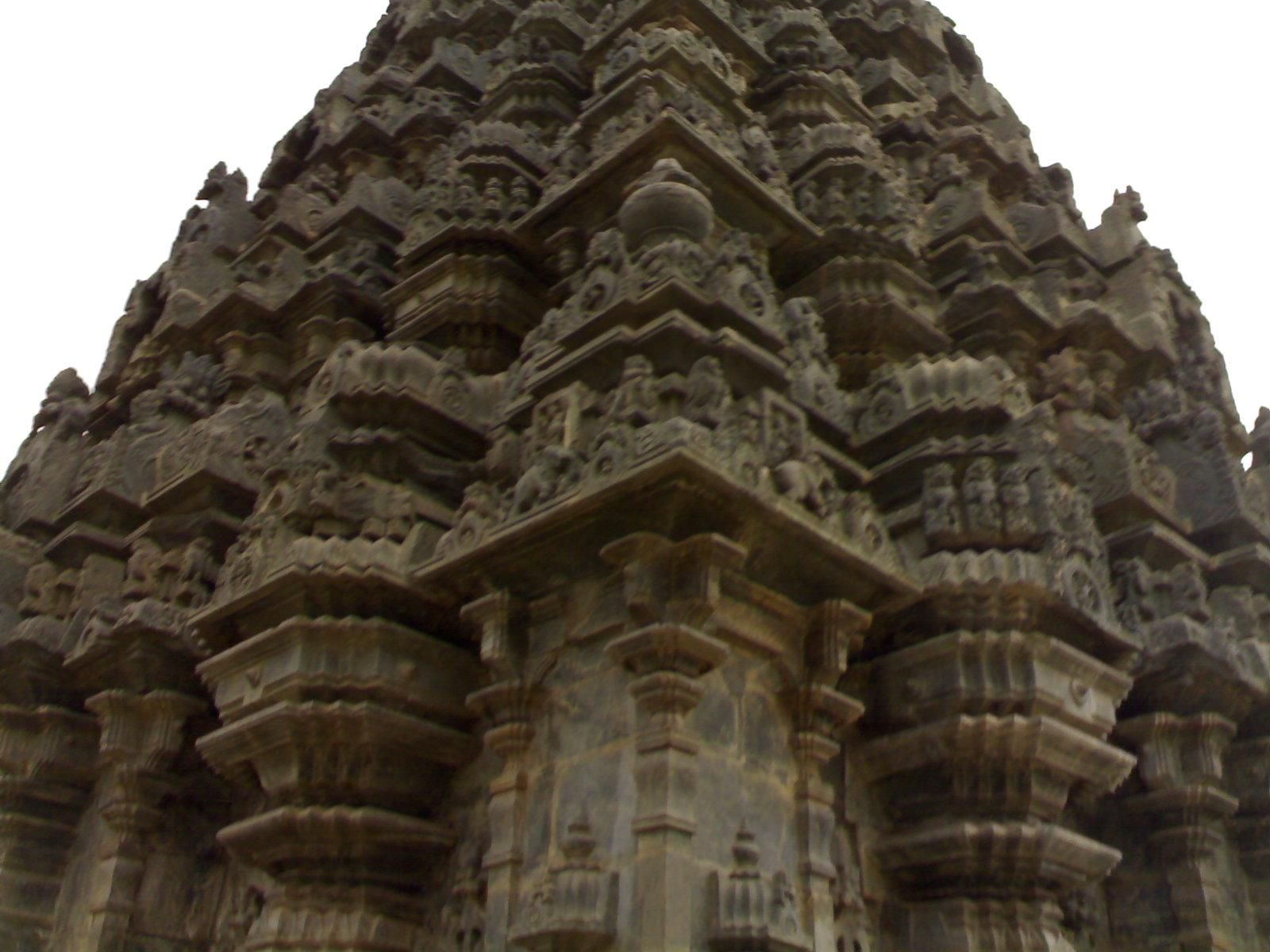
Amruteshwara Temple in Annigeri

=== Amruteshwara Temple ===
The Amruteshwara Temple was built in the Dharwad District in 1050 CE with dravida articulation, and was the first temple made of soapstone.

The large and black stone Amruteshwar Temple is in the Kalyani Chalukyas style. The temple has a roof supported by 76 pillars and carvings of mythological figures on its walls.

The Amruteshwara Temple was to be the prototype for later, more articulated structures such as the Mahadeva Temple (Itagi) at Itagi. Based on the general plan of the Amrtesvara Temple, the Mahadeva Temple was built in 1112 CE and has the same architectural components as its predecessor. There are, however, differences in their articulation.

== Other temples ==
Many other temples are also seen at Annigeri, such as:

- The Ramalinga Temple
- The Banashankari Temple
- The Gajina Basappa Temple
- The Hire Hanuman Temple
- Puradhireshwar Temple
- Kambada Hanuman Temple

== Geography ==
Annigeri is located at 15.43°N 75.43°E. It has an average elevation of 624 metres (2047 feet).

== Demographics ==
As of 2001 India census, Annigeri had a population of 25,709. Males constitute 51% of the population and females 49%. Annigeri has an average literacy rate of 55%, lower than the national average of 59.5%; with 61% of the males and 39% of females literate. 14% of the population is under 6 years of age.

== Transportation ==
Annigeri railway station is a railway station located on the Guntakal–Vasco da Gama line, serves the area.

== See also ==
- Hero-stone of Rashrakuta period at Annigeri
- Historian unearths sacrificial sect theory on Annigeri skulls
- Western Chalukya temples
- Western Chalukya architecture
- Western Chalukya Empire
- North Karnataka
- Tourism in North Karnataka
- Gadag
- Lakshmeshwar
- Lakkundi
- Mahadeva Temple (Itagi)
- Dambal
- Kundgol
- Kuknur
- Sudi
- Gajendragad
