= Mahadeva Temple, Itagi =

Mahadeva Temple Itagi Ittagi
- Village
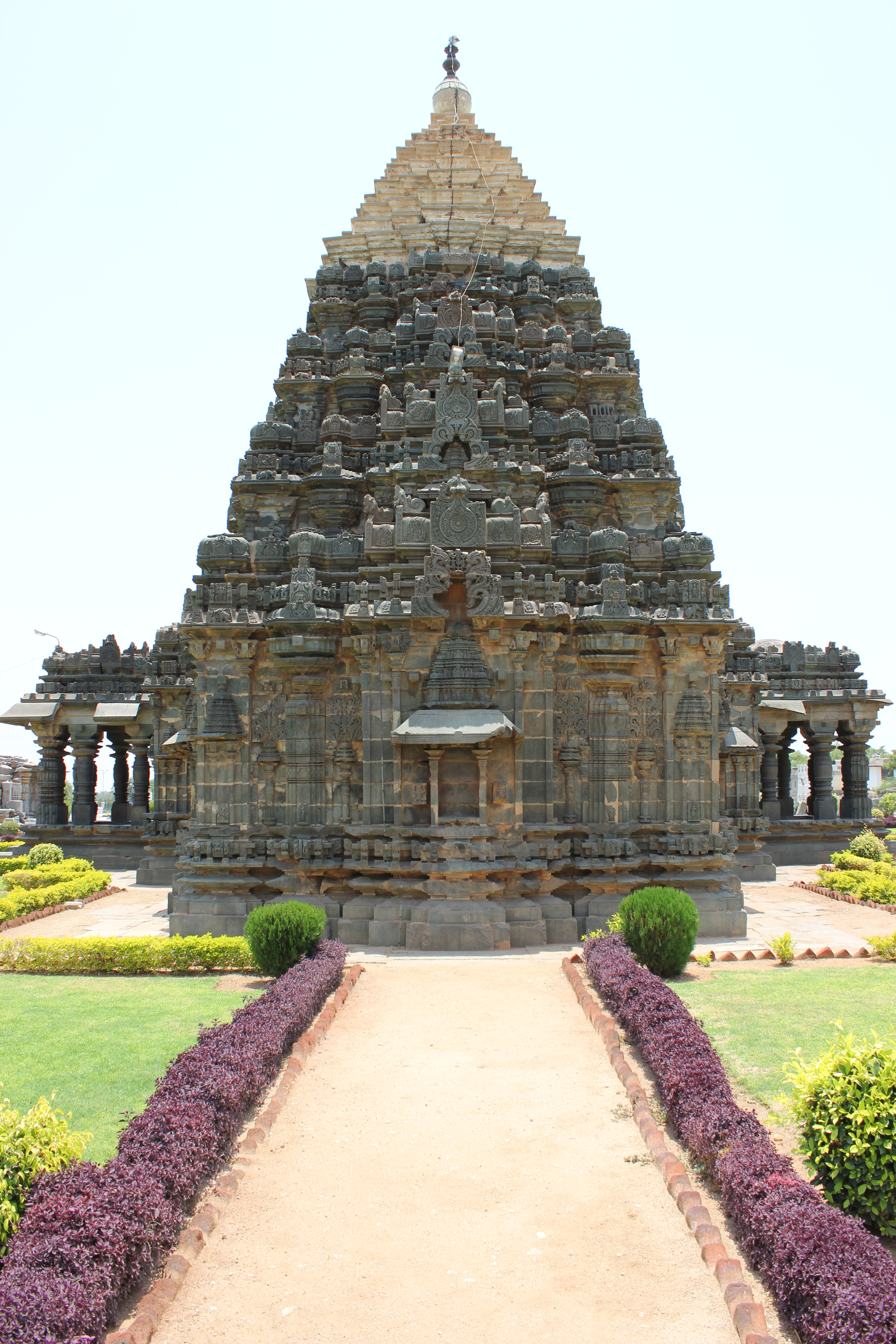
- Mahadeva temple (1112 CE) at Itagi

- Location in Karnataka, India
- Coordinates: 15.49°N 75.995°E
- Country: India
- State: Karnataka
- District: Koppal

Government
  - Type: Panchayat raj

Languages
  - Official: Kannada
- Time zone: UTC+5:30 (IST)
- ISO 3166 code: IN-KA
- Vehicle registration: 37
- Nearest city: Kuknur
- Website: karnataka.gov.in

The Mahadeva Temple is located in the village of Itagi in Yelburga Taluk, in the Koppal District of Karnataka state, India. It is about 7 km (4 mi) from Kuknur and 20 km (12 mi) from Lakkundi.

== Mahadeva Temple ==
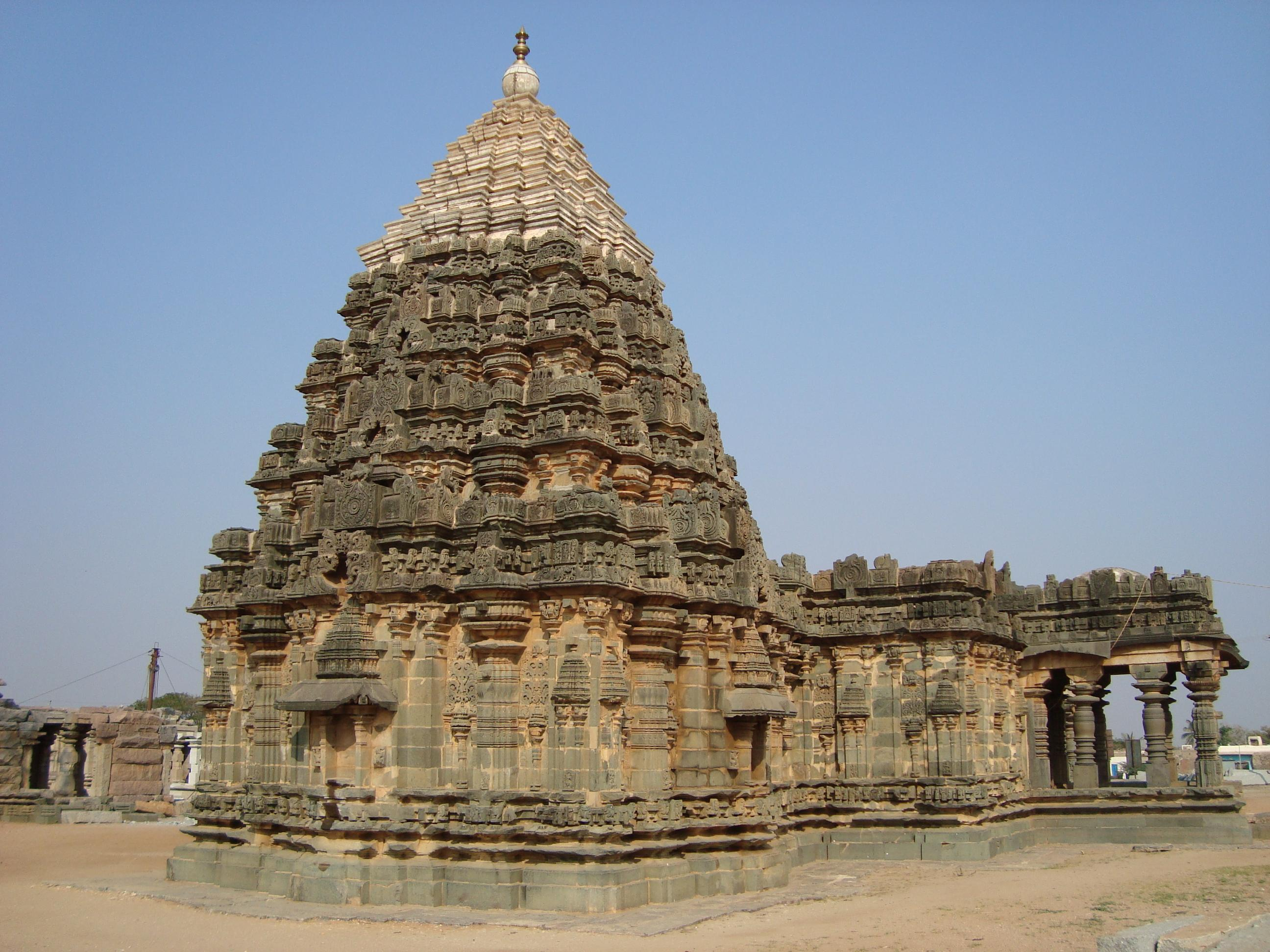
Profile of Mahadeva Temple at Itagi (or Ittagi) in the Koppal district, Karnataka

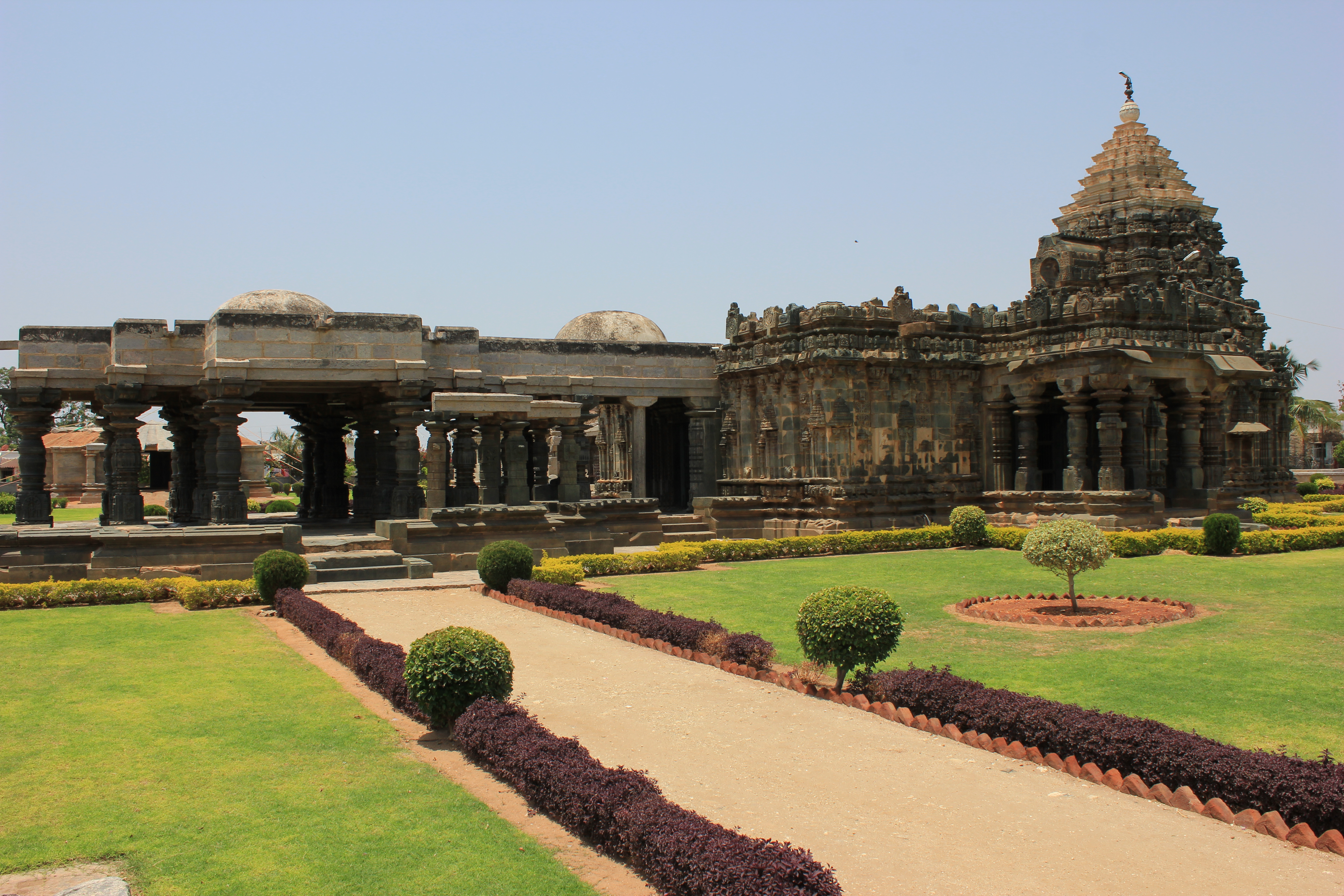
Mahadeva Temple at Itagi (or Ittagi) in the Koppal district, 1112 CE, an example of dravida articulation with a nagara superstructure

The Mahadeva Temple was built based on the general plan of the Amruteshwara Temple at Annigeri (used as the prototype). The Mahadeva Temple has the same architectural components; there is a difference in their articulation.

The Mahadeva Temple at Itagi was built circa 1112 CE by Mahadeva, a commander (dandanayaka) in the army of the Western Chalukya King Vikramaditya VI. Itagi is about 22 miles (35 km) east of Gadag and 40 miles (64 km) west of Hampi. The temple is dedicated to Hindu God Shiva. The well-executed sculptures, finely crafted carvings on walls, pillars and the tower make it a good example of complete Western Chalukyan art which speaks volumes about the taste of the Chalukyan artisans. An inscription dated 1112 CE in the temple calls it "Emperor among Temples" (Devalaya Chakravarti). Art historian Henry Cousens called this monument the "finest in Kannada country after Halebidu". These Western Chalukya monuments, regional variants of existing dravida (South Indian) temples, defined the Karnata dravida tradition. The Mahadeva temple is officially protected as a national monument by the Archaeological Survey of India.

== Details ==
=== Temple plan ===
The temple plan consists of a shrine (cella) which is connected to a closed mantapa (hall) by a vestibule (antechamber). The closed mantapa leads to an open pillared mantapa, with the temple as a whole facing the east. Some parts of the temple, such as the cornice and parapet over the outer edge of the roof of the open mantapa are missing. The main temple, the sanctum of which has a linga (symbol of Shiva), is surrounded by thirteen minor shrines, each with its own linga. The temple has two other shrines, dedicated to Murthinarayana and Chandraleshwari, parents of Mahadeva, the Chalukya commander who consecrated the temple.

The closed mantapa has a doorway on each side, with the eastern doorway leading to the open mantapa and the western doorway to the sanctum. The door panels are well wrought and the ceiling of the porches have a ribbed design in them. The decoration of the outer walls follows the same pattern as that of the shrine. The great open mantapa has 64 pillars, 24 of which are full pillars which start from the floor and support the main ceiling. The remaining are half pillars (or "dwarf pillars") which start from the bench (parapet wall) that surrounds the mantapa and support the sloping eaves. The pillars in this hall bear similarities to the porch pillars at the Dodda Basappa Temple at Dambal and the lathe-turned pillars (whose rounded sections are lathe-turned) at the Kasivisvesvara Temple at Lakkundi.

The square ceiling of the open mantapa which are supported by the four central pillars exhibits interesting fretted stonework. The ceiling here has been worked into a decorative arabesque foliage and makara (mythical beasts) which flow from the mouth of a Kirtimukha (gargoyle or demon face). This type of stonework is considered as high a quality as any. In stark contrast, the interior of the closed mantapa and the sanctum are plain and simple. It is believed that bracket figures that once adorned the outside pillars are now missing. These forward leaning bracket figures (Salabhanjika), which normally represent female forms in various poses (such as dancing or adorning themselves), would have rested on small blocks on the shaft of the pillars (capital), finding support from the underside of the overhanging cornice via a slot in their upper end.

== Gallery ==
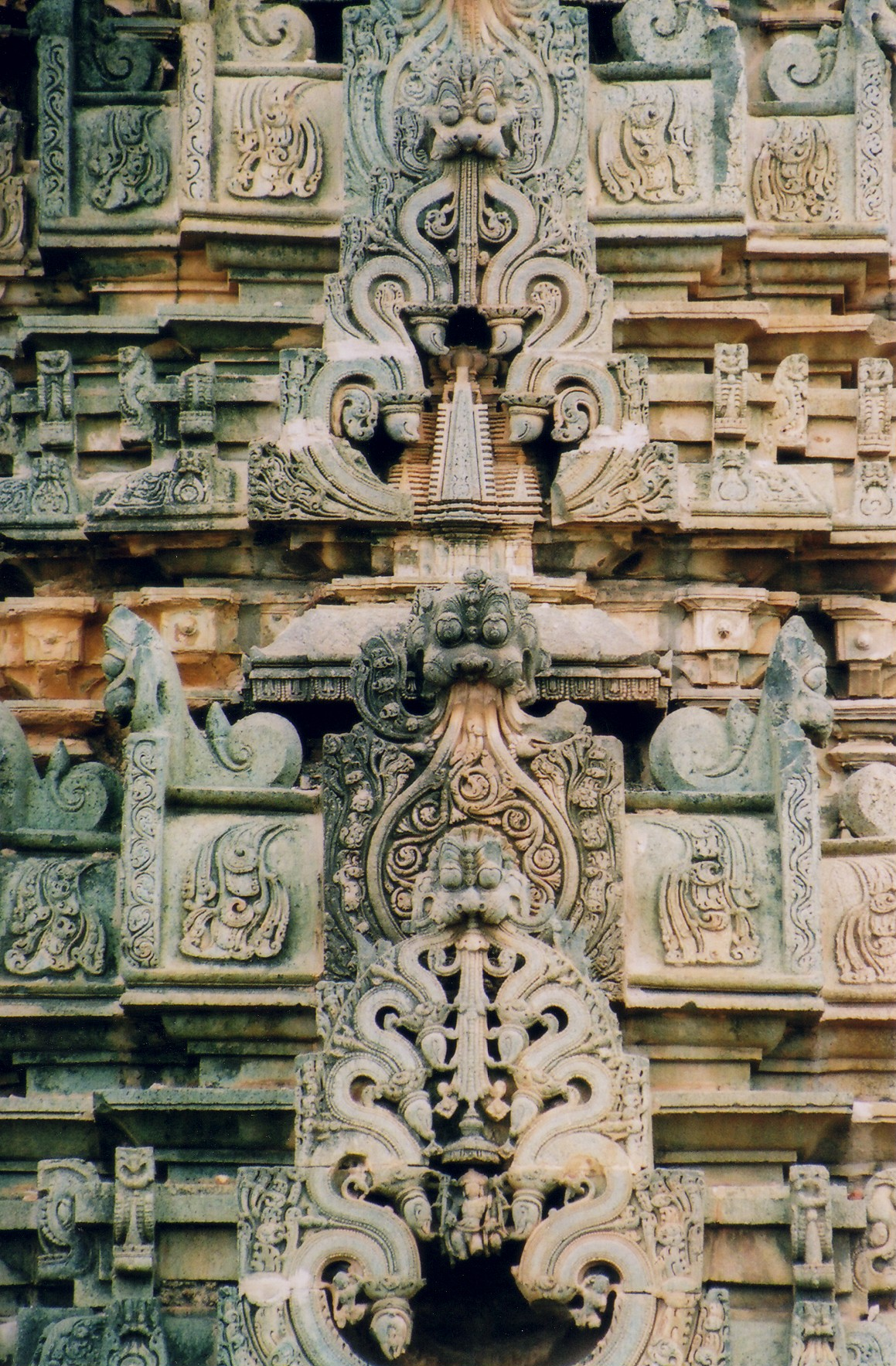
Kirtimukha on superstructure of Vimana

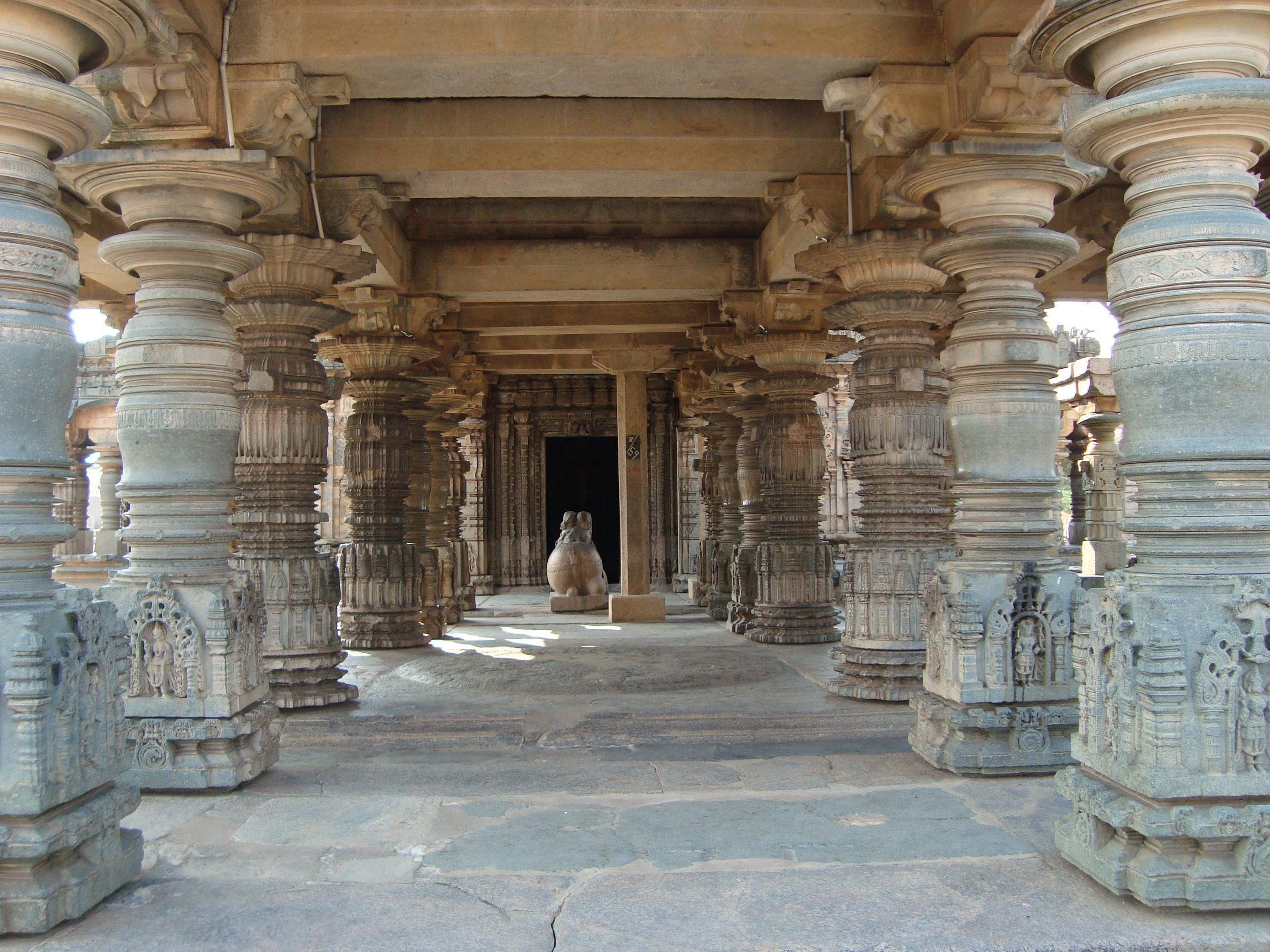
Mantapa (hall) with lathe turned pillars at the Mahadeva Temple

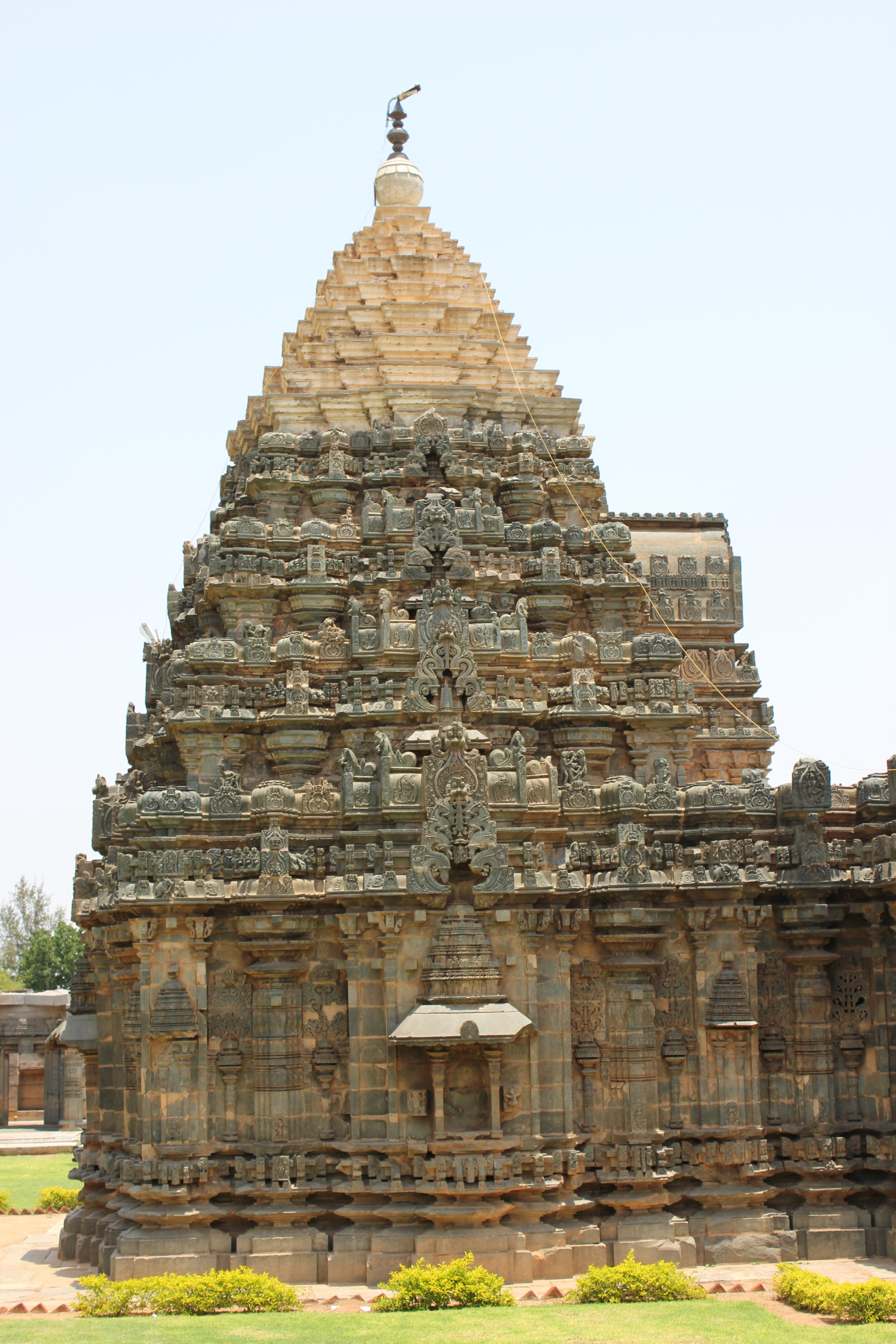
Vimana of Mahadeva temple with decorative articulation

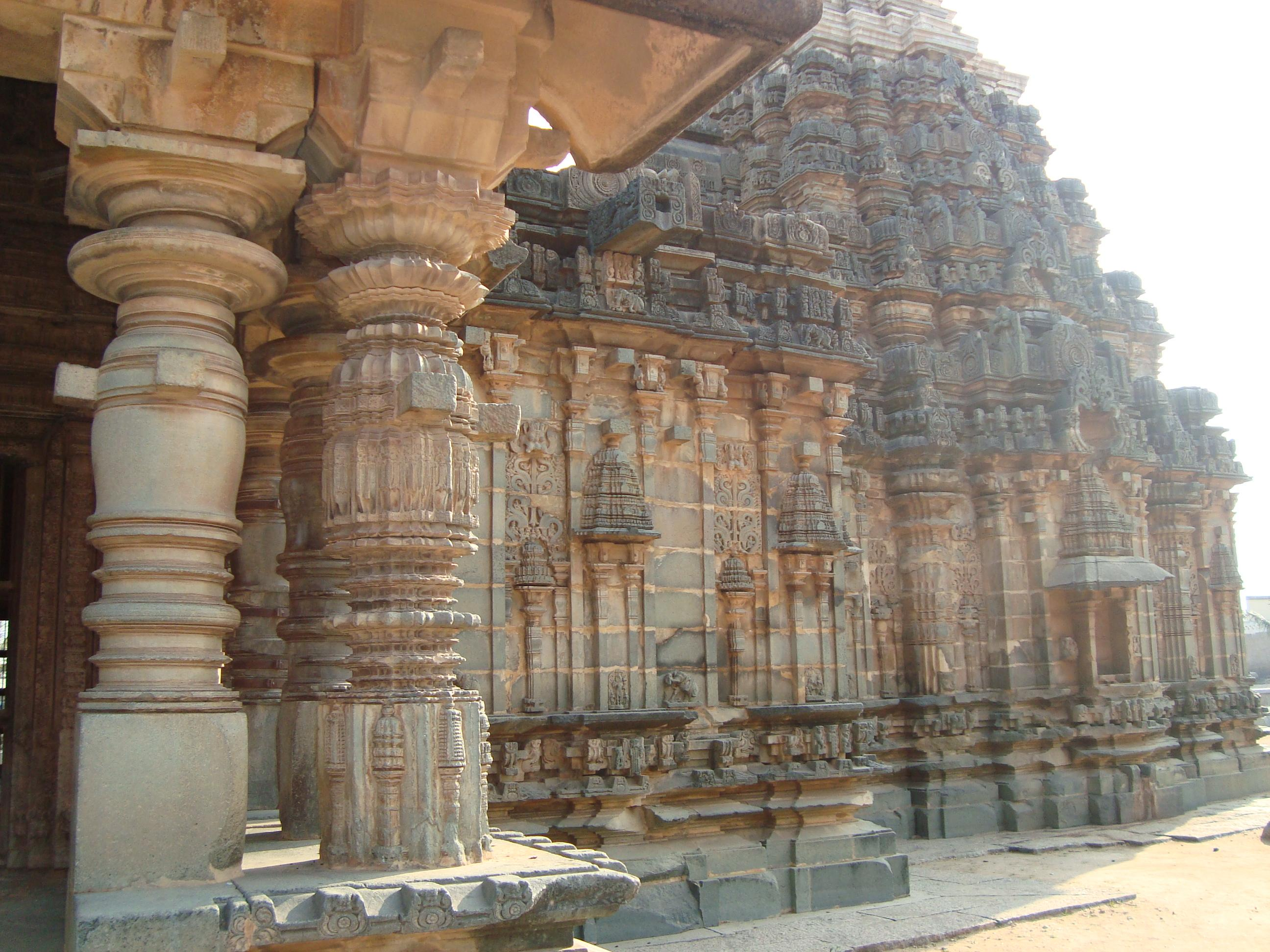
Mahadeva Temple at Itagi (or Ittagi) in the Koppal district, Karnataka

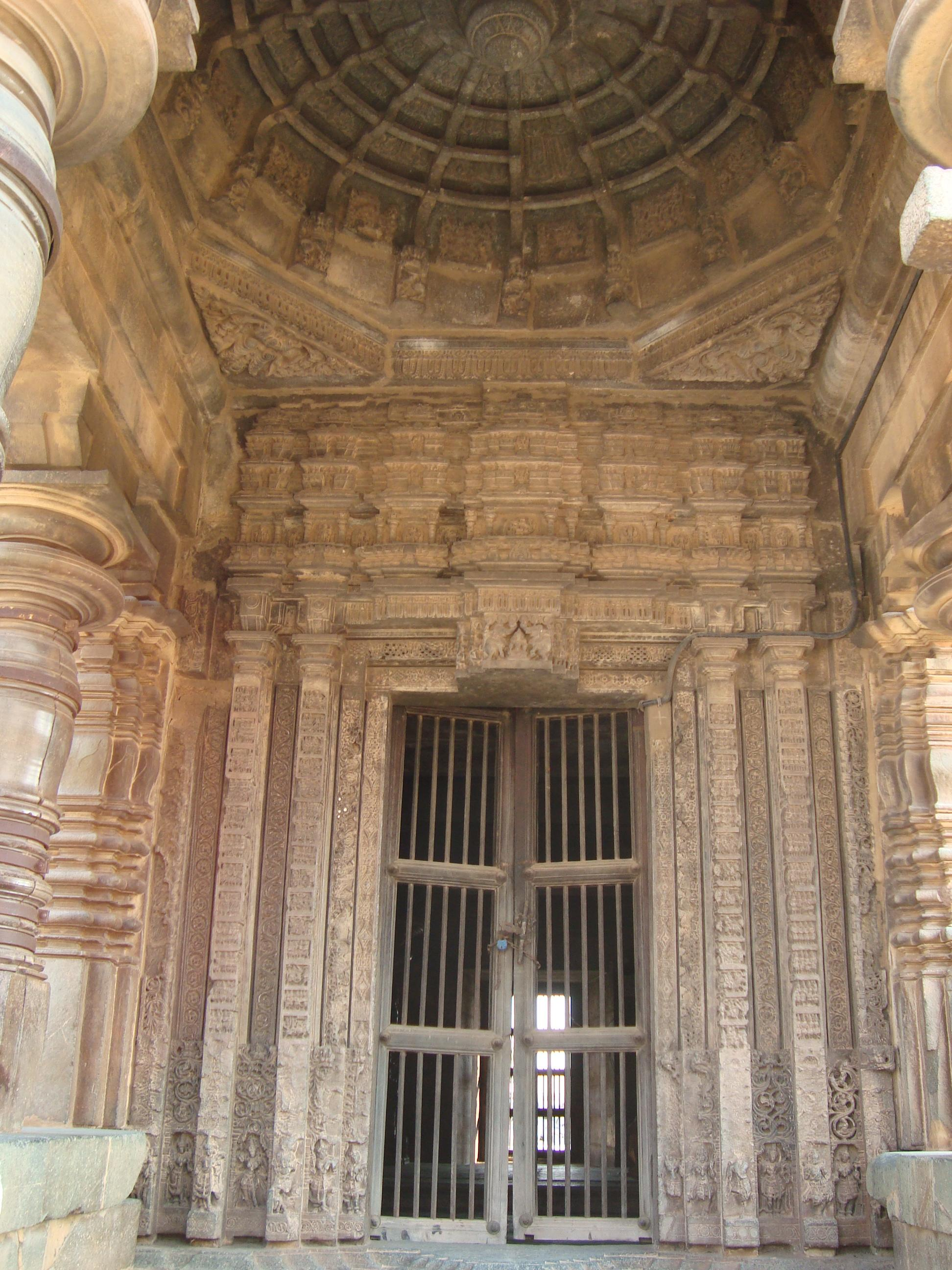
Porch entrance with ornate pillars and domical ceiling at Mahadeva Temple, Itagi

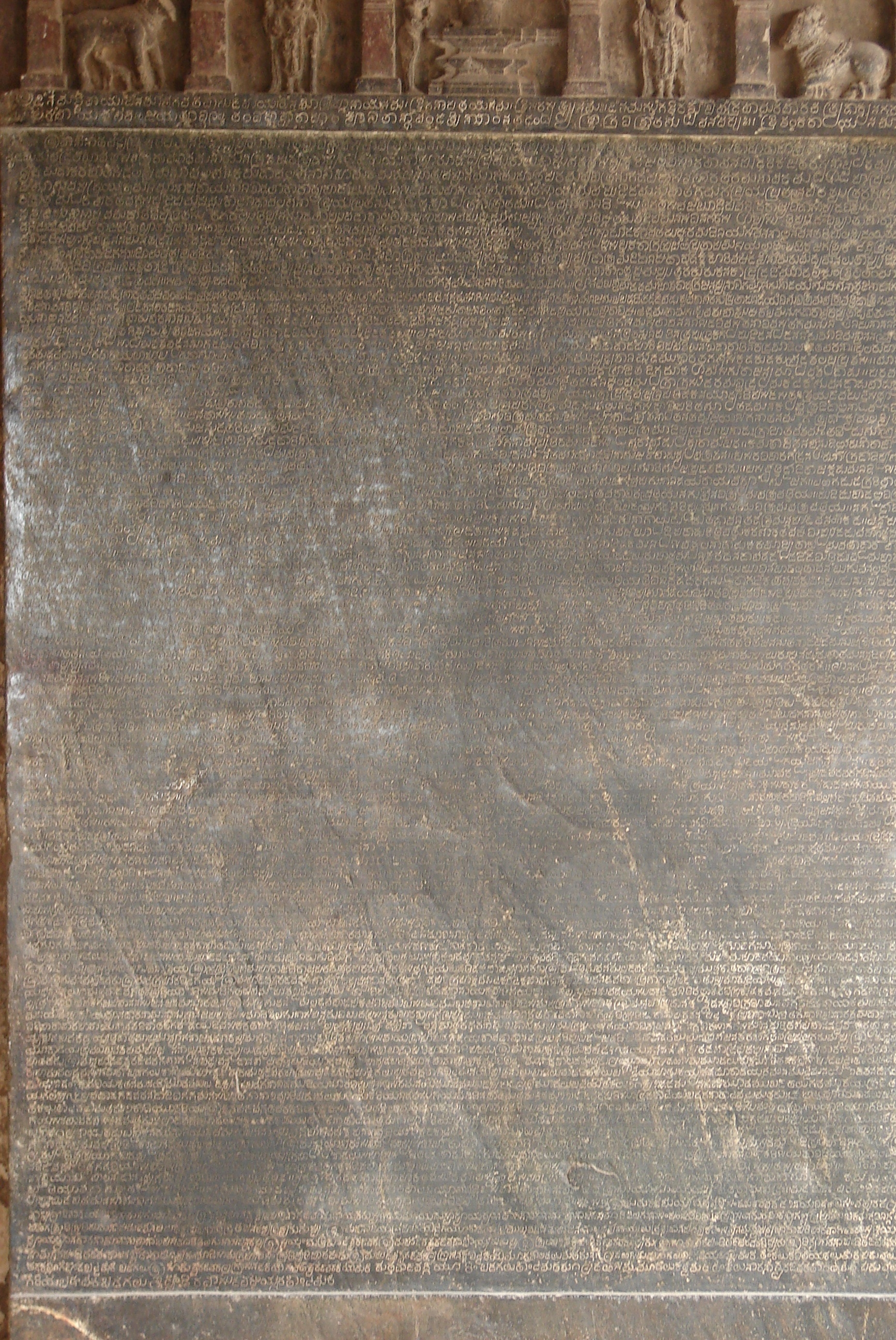
Old Kannada inscription (1112 CE) honouring the temple as "Emperor among temples"

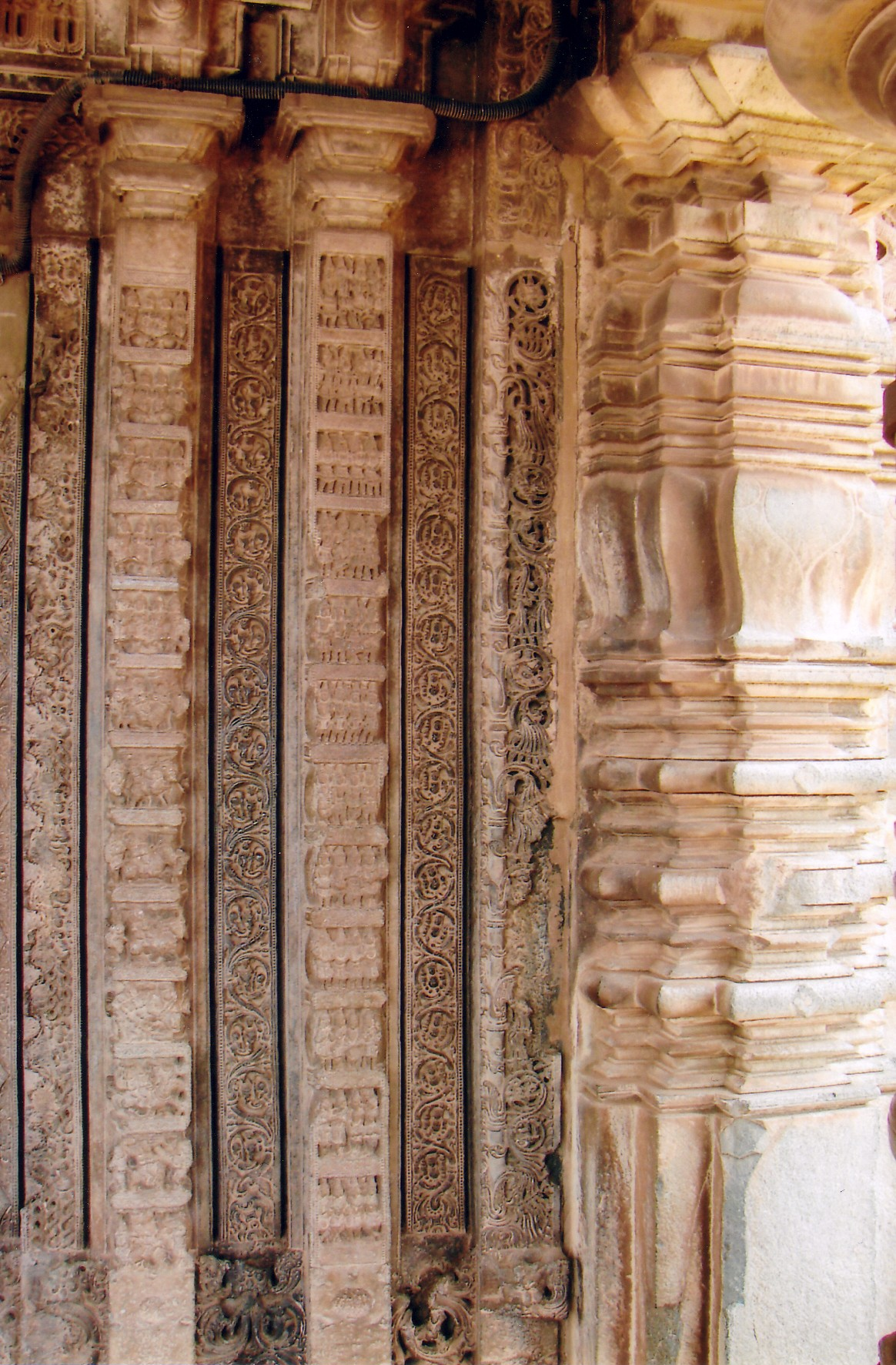
Doorjamb decoration on porch at Mahadeva Temple

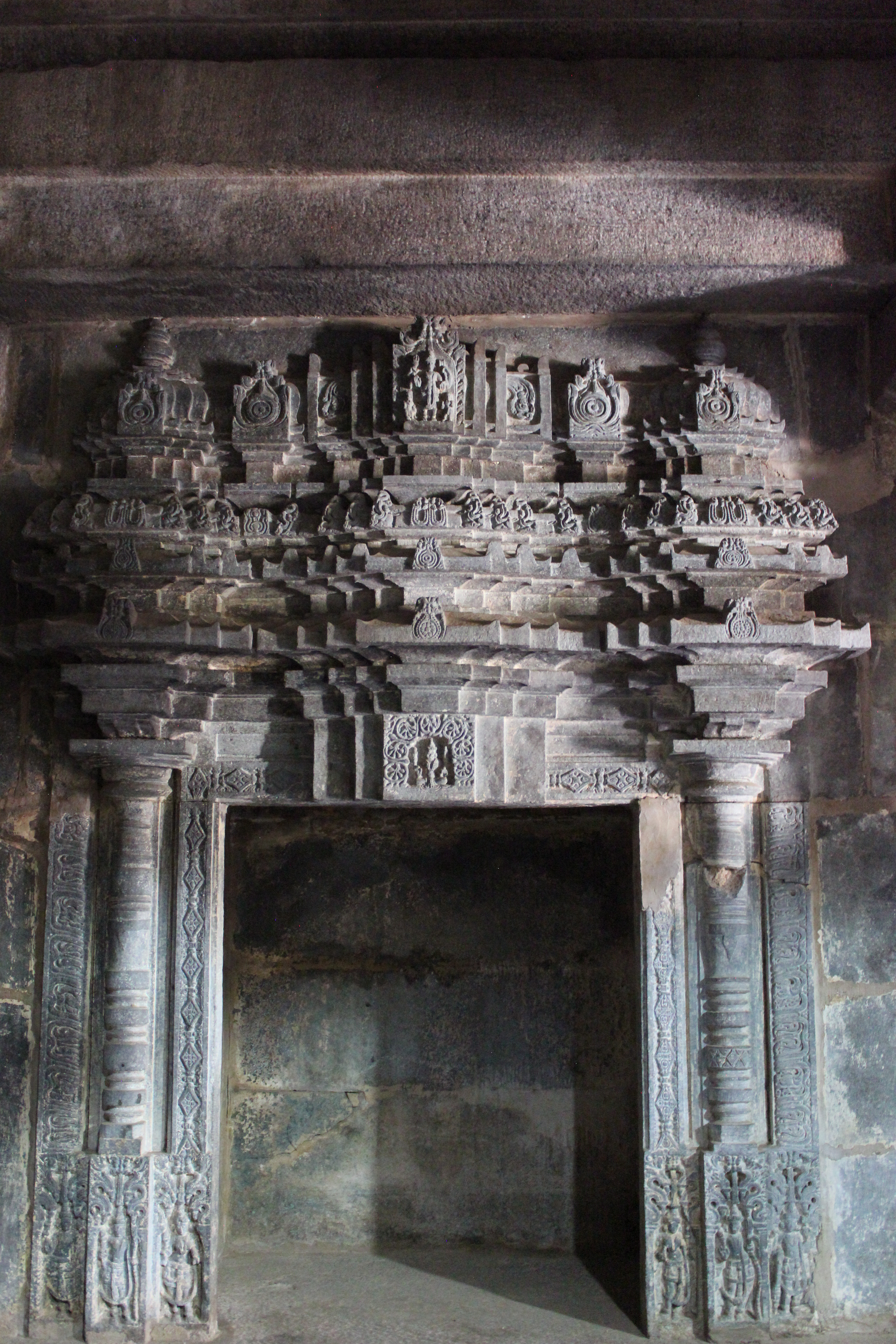
Minor shrine inside the closed mantapa of the Mahadeva temple at Itagi

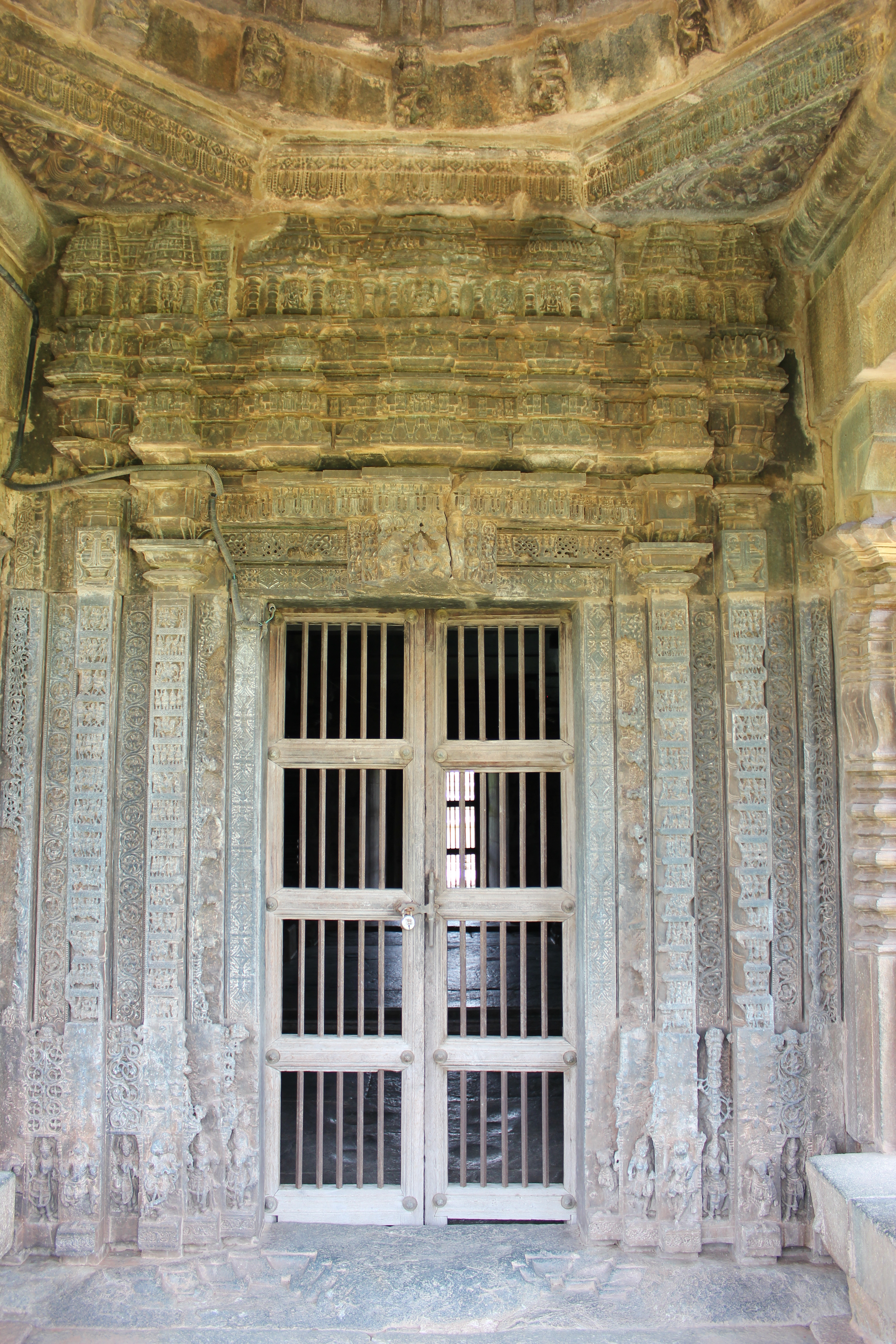
Decorative lintel and door jamb with domical ceiling in the lateral entrance to the Mahadeva temple at Itagi

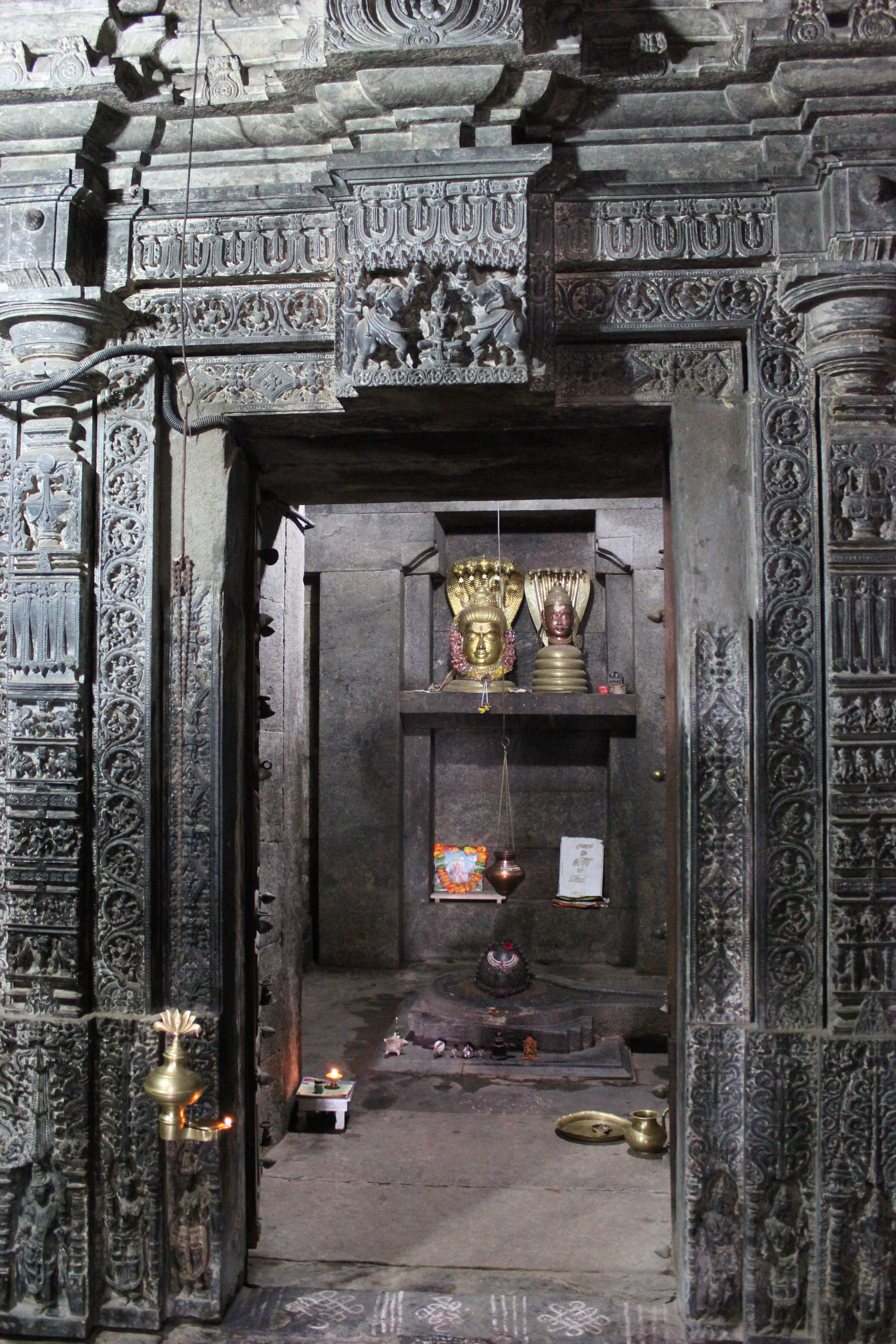
Decorative door jamb and lintel over the entrance to the sanctum in the Mahadeva temple at Itagi

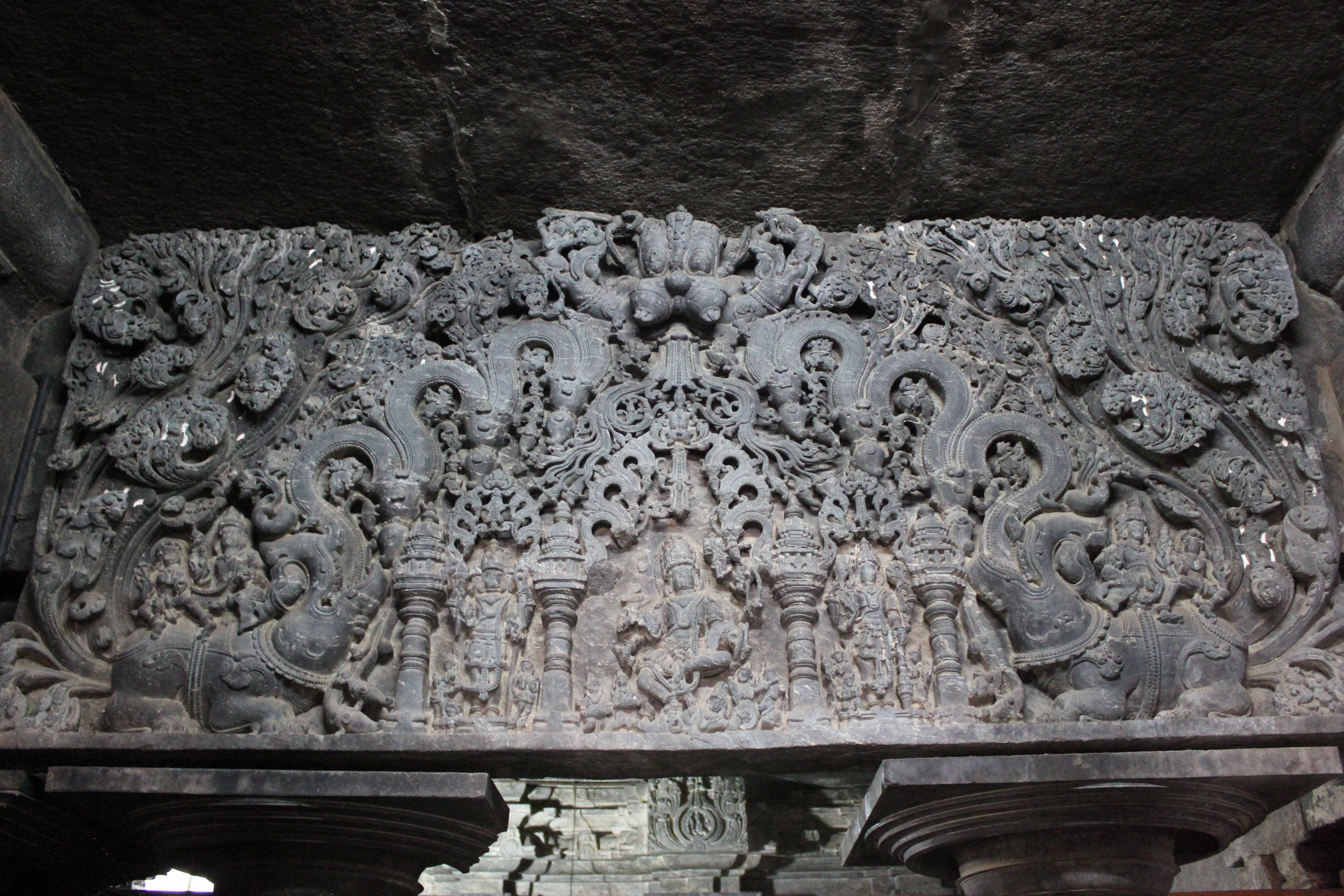
Lintel relief over entrance to sanctum in the Mahadeva temple at Itagi

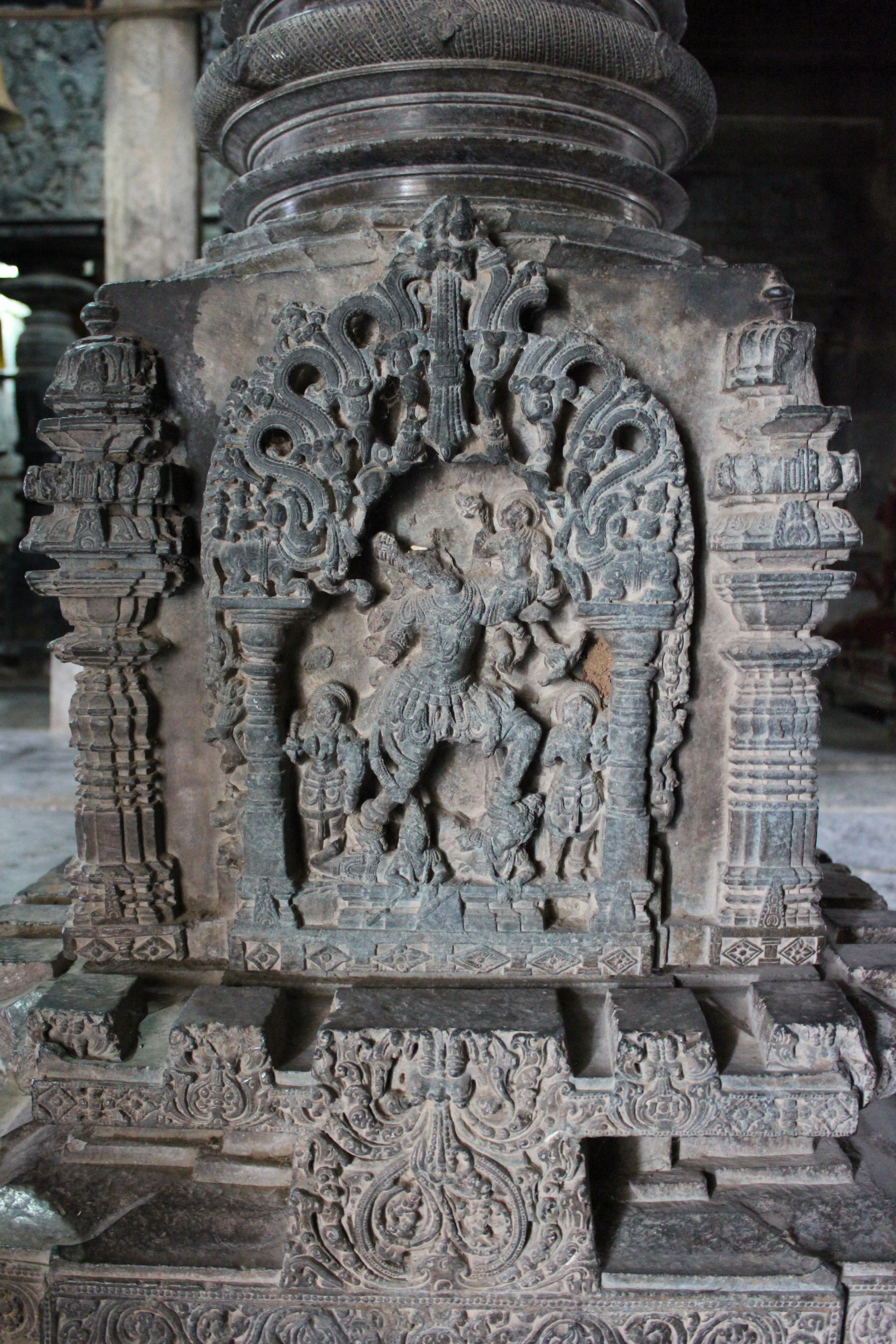
Hall pillar pedestal relief in the Mahadeva temple at Itagi

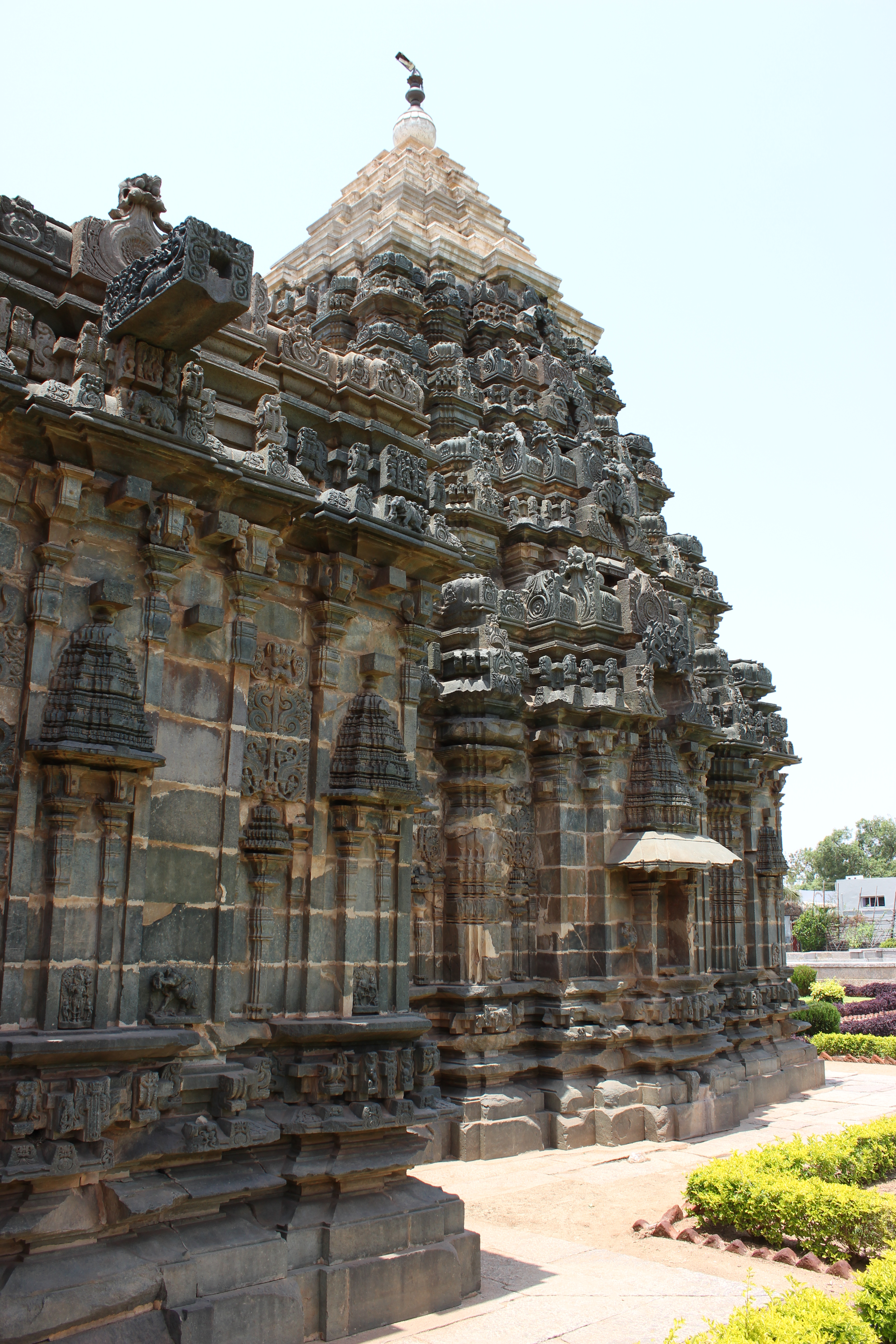
Profile of Vesara tower and shrine in the Mahadeva temple at Itagi

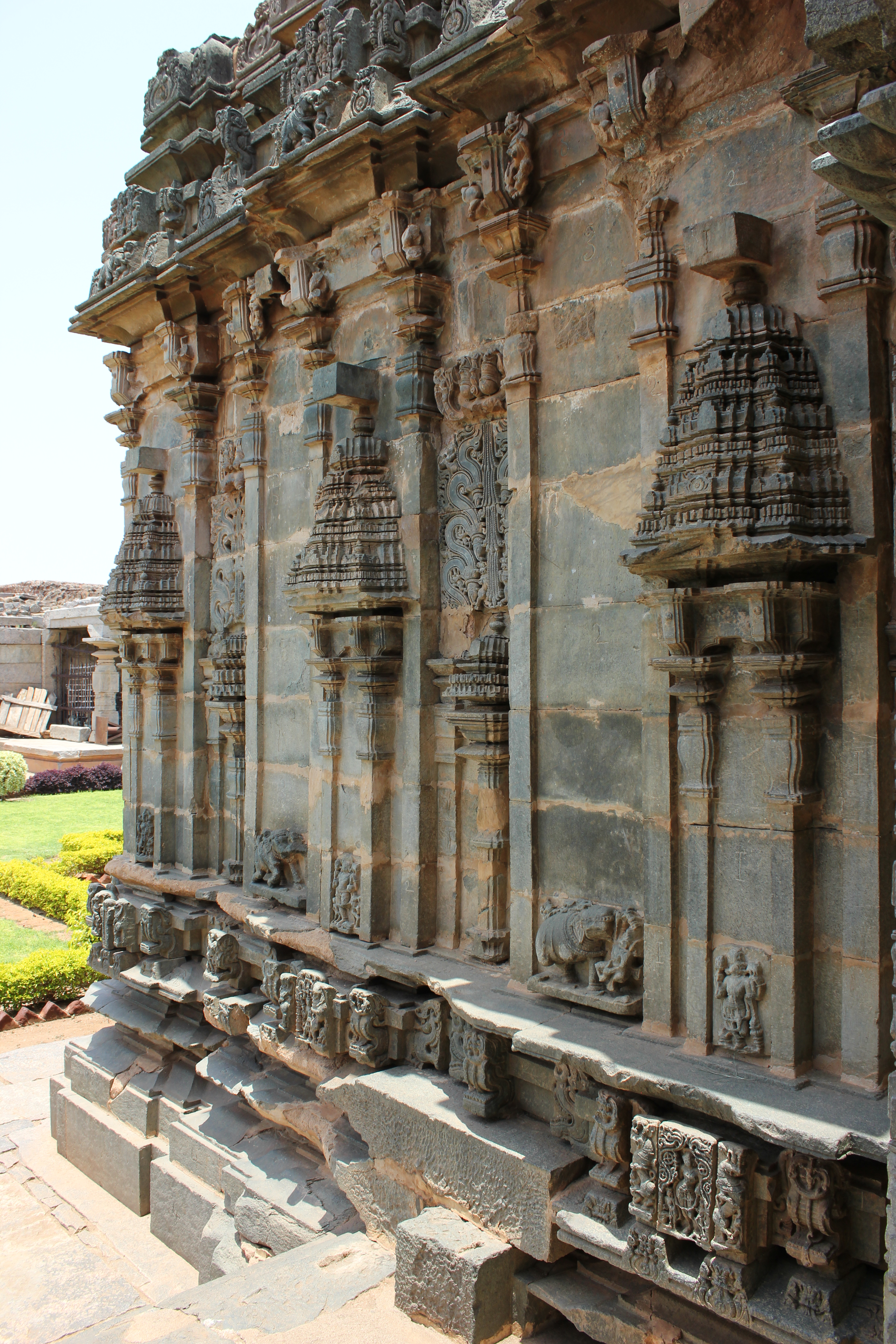
Profile of wall relief in the Mahadeva temple at Itagi

== See also ==
- Hampi
- Anegondi
- Kuknur
- Kanakagiri
- Yelburga
- Koppal
- Karnataka
