= Navalinga Temple =

9th-century Hindu temples in India

Coordinates: 15°27′32″N 75°57′36″E

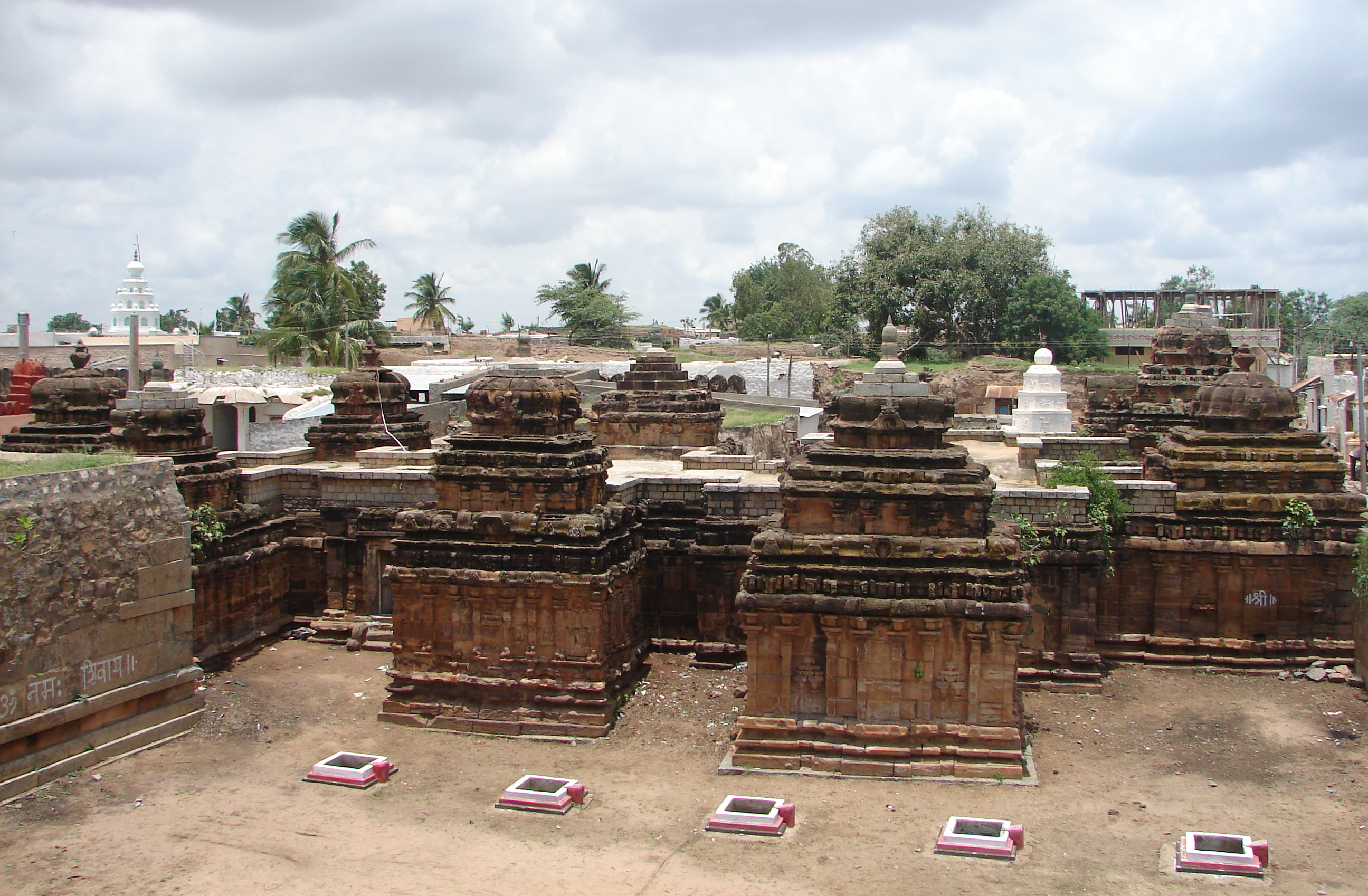
Dravidian style architecture. Top view of Navalinga Temples at Kuknur, Karnataka

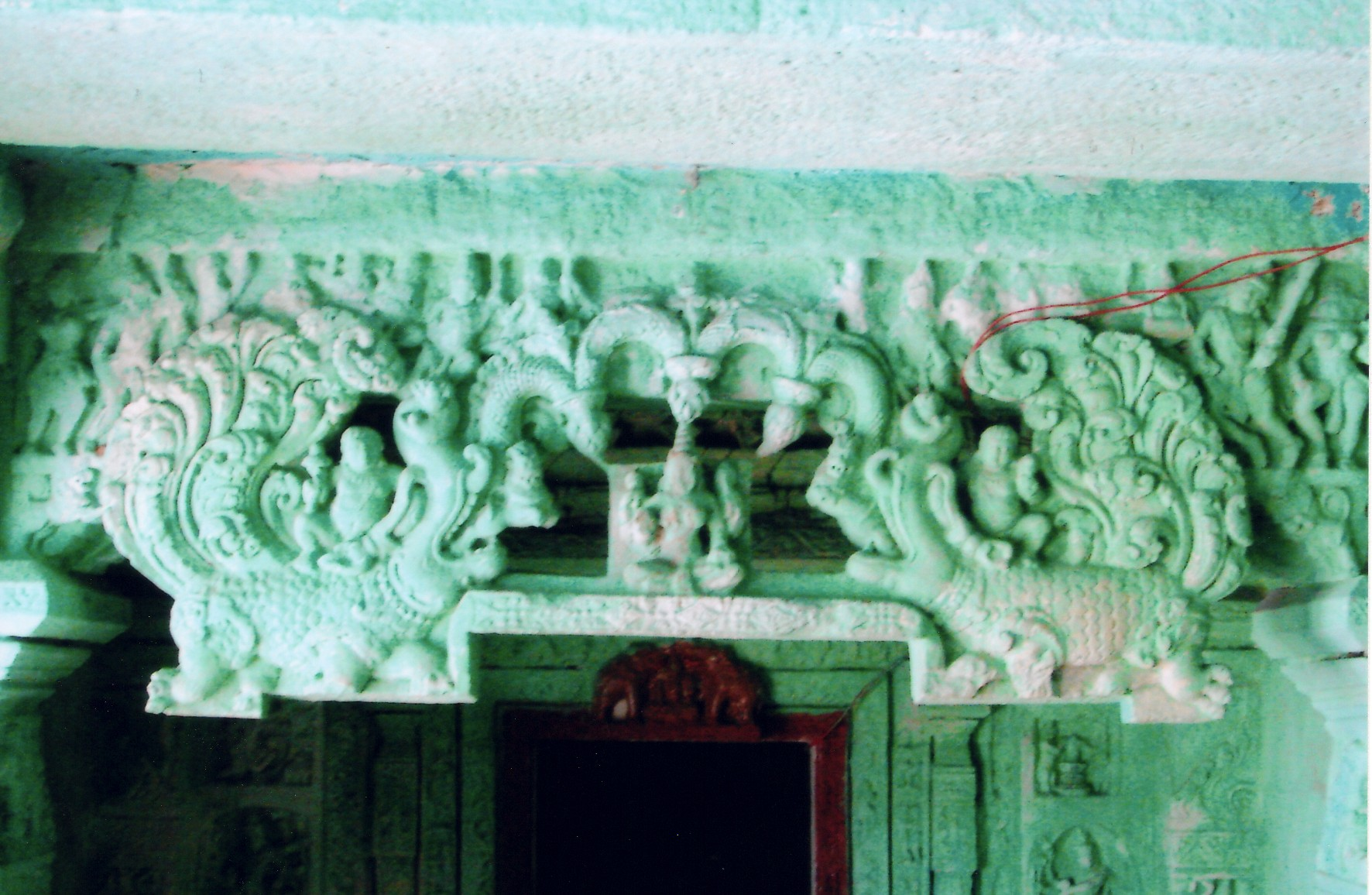
Decorative architrave above shrine entrance

The Navalinga temple is a cluster of Hindu temples built in the 9th century, during the reign of King Amoghavarsha I or his son Krishna II of the Rashtrakuta Dynasty. The temple is located in the town of Kukkanur (also called Kuknur), 4 miles (6 km) north of Itagi in Koppal district and 25 miles (40 km) east of Gadag in Karnataka state, India. Built in the South Indian dravida style, each of the nine temples in the cluster has a linga, the universal symbol of Hindu God Shiva, and hence the name Navalinga (literally, 'nine lingas').

== General plan ==
A clusters of temples, the Navalinga group appears to have been placed asymmetrically, without any particular order. Despite being constructed from inferior quality sandstone, the decorative finish is rich, though much of it is lost due to degradation of the shrine walls. Each of the shrines has a South Indian style shikhara (superstructure). The ensemble has four mantapas (hall) in all, three of which are in a line going east-west and open to the shrines. Each of the shrines has a Shiva linga in the sanctum, though the lintel above the entrance has an image of Gajalakshmi, the consort of God Vishnu.

== Sculpture ==
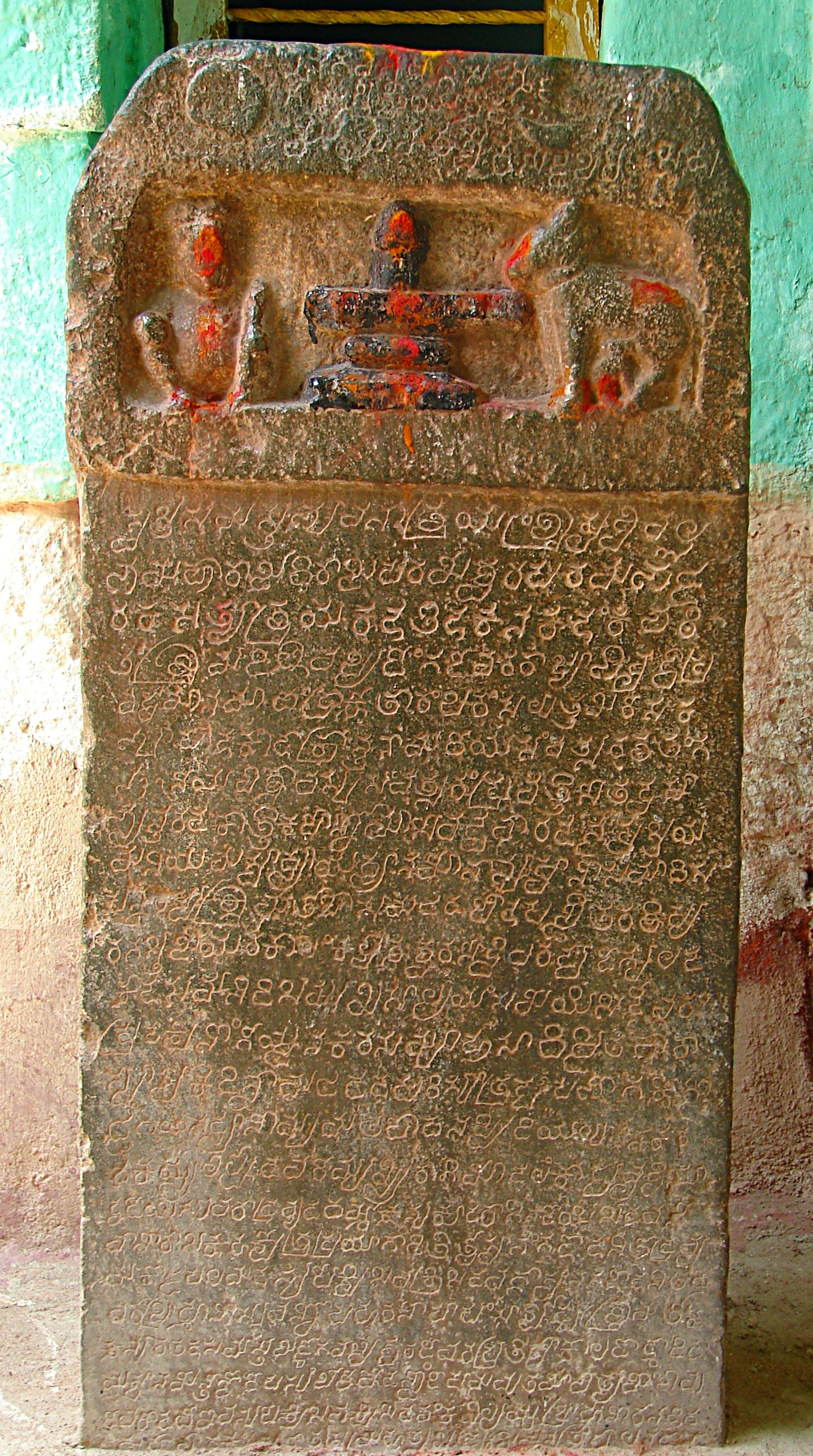
old-Kannada inscription at Navalinga temple

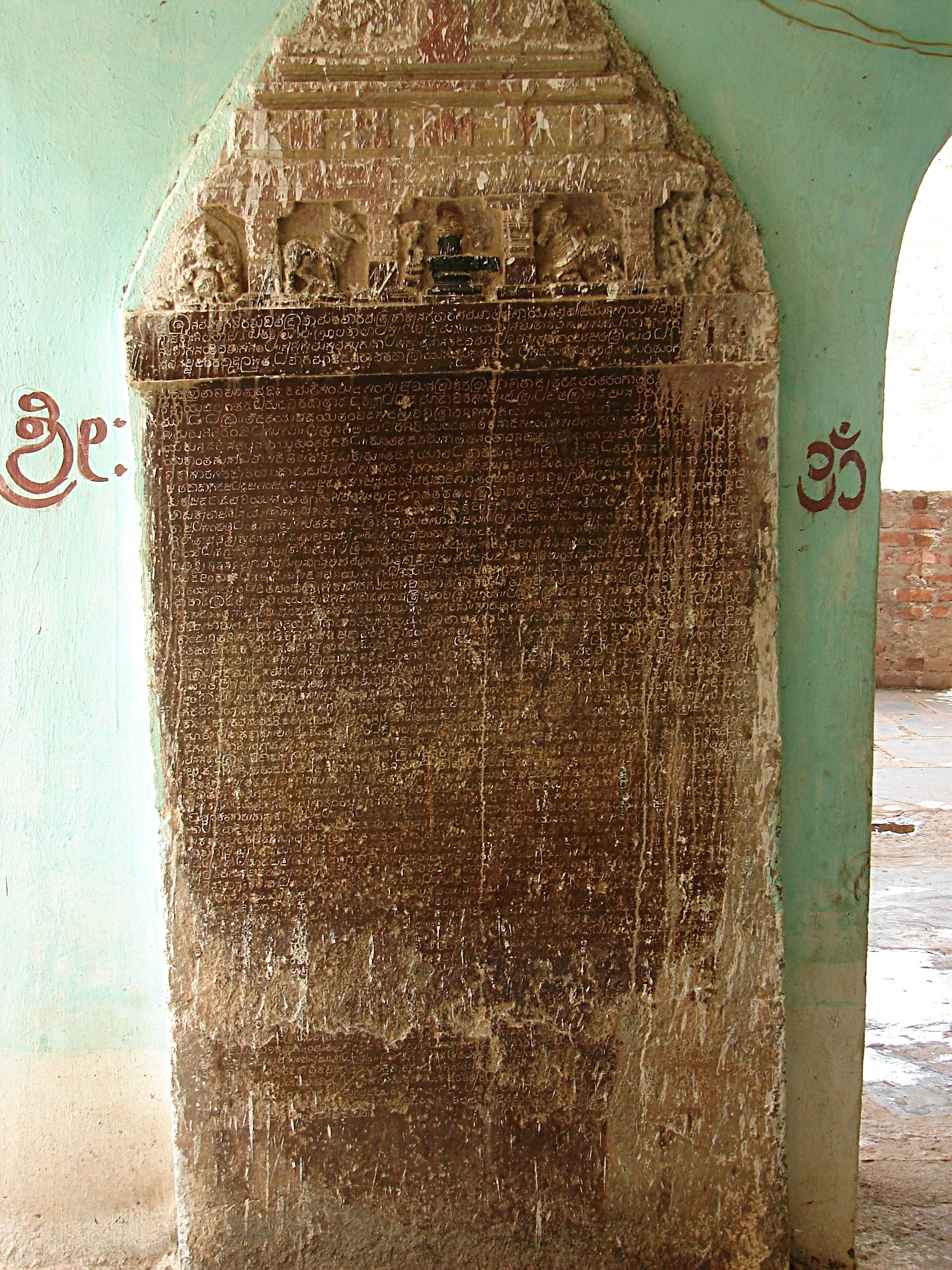
old-Kannada inscription at Navalinga temple

The pillars in the halls are of better quality than seen at Pattadakal, indicating an advancement of this art from the previous centuries. Architraves were popular and a very good example has survived and has two makaras (mythical beasts) with circular scales and florid tails. The temple complex has two well preserved old-Kannada inscriptions. Fifteen inscriptions are found in the town in all which mostly date from 1005 CE to 1186 CE, though a few from the Vijayanagara period also exist. The inscriptions mention grants to temples of various Hindu goddesses such as Chamundi, Ganga, Sarasvati, Kalikadevi and Mahamayi as well as God Mallikarjuna. It is proposed that the Navalinga temples may have originally been consecrated in honor of these goddesses.
