= Hebsur railway station =

Railway station in Karnataka

Hebsur

General information
- Location: Hebsur, Dharwad district, Karnatak; India
- Coordinates: 15°25′19″N 75°17′02″E
- Elevation: 591 metres (1,939 ft)
- System: Indian Railways station
- Owner: Indian Railways
- Operator: South Western Railway zone
- Line: Guntakal–Vasco da Gama line
- Platforms: 3
- Tracks: Double Electric-Line

Construction
- Structure type: Standard (on ground)

Other information
- Status: Functioning
- Station code: HBS
- Zone(s): South Western Railway zone
- Division(s): Hubballi

Services
Preceding station	Indian Railways	Following station
Sisvinhalli towards ?	South Western Railway zone Guntakal–Vasco da Gama section	Kusugal towards ?
Location
- Interactive map

Hebsur railway station is a railway station located on the Guntakal–Vasco da Gama line operated by the South Western Railway zone under Hubballi railway division. It is situated at Hebsur in Dharwad district in the Indian state of Karnatak.
