= Hebsur =

- village
- Location in Karnataka, India Hebsur (India)
- Coordinates: 15.448610°N 75.303650°E
- Country: India
- State: Karnataka
- District: Dharwad
- Talukas: Hubli

Government
  - Body: Gram panchayat

Population (2011)
  - Total: 6,245

Languages
  - Official: Kannada
- Time zone: UTC+5:30 (IST)
- ISO 3166 code: IN-KA
- Vehicle registration: KA
- Nearest city: Hubli
- Lok Sabha constituency: Dharwad rural
- Vidhan Sabha constituency: Hubli rural
- Website: karnataka.gov.in

Hebsur is a village in the southern state of Karnataka, India. It is located in the Hubli taluk of Dharwad district in Karnataka.

== Demographics ==
As of the 2011 Census of India there were 1,276 households in Hebsur and a total population of 6,245 consisting of 3,152 males and 3,093 females. There were 700 children ages 0-6.

== Transportation ==
Hebsur railway station is the nearest railway connection of Hebsur, located on the Guntakal–Vasco da Gama line operated by the South Western Railway zone.

== See also ==
- Dharwad
- Districts of Karnataka
