= Itagi, Koppal =

Village in Koppal district, Karnataka, India

Itagi Ittagi
- Village
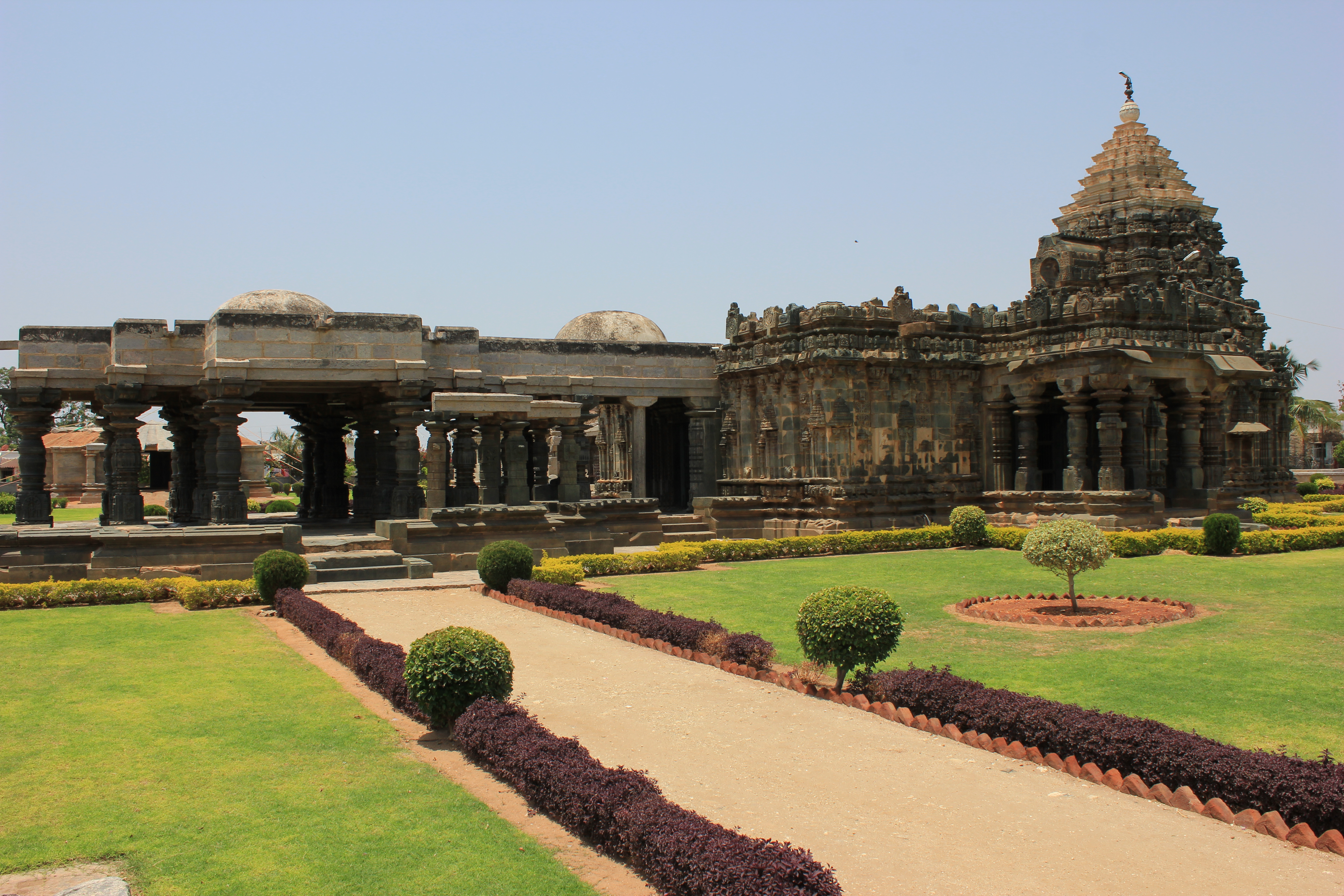
- Interactive map of Itagi
- Country: India
- State: Karnataka
- District: Koppal district

Itagi, also written Ittagi, is a village in Koppal district in Karnataka, India. Its former names include Ishtagapuri and Itige. The village is known for the Itagi Mahadeva Temple, built in 1112 CE. Itagi is 7 kilometres (4.3 mi) from Kuknur, 22 kilometres (14 mi) from the town of Yelburga, and 15 kilometres (9.3 mi) from the city of Koppal.

According to inscriptions, Ittagi was the birthplace of Mahadeva, who built Mahadeva Temple as well as several others.
