= Sisvinhalli railway station =

Railway station in Karnataka

Sisvinhalli

General information
- Location: State Highway 28, Shisuvinahalli, Dharwad district, Karnatak; India
- Coordinates: 15°25′48″N 75°19′10″E
- Elevation: 595 metres (1,952 ft)
- System: Indian Railways station
- Owner: Indian Railways
- Operator: South Western Railway zone
- Line: Guntakal–Vasco da Gama line
- Platforms: 2
- Tracks: Double Electric-Line

Construction
- Structure type: Standard (on ground)

Other information
- Status: Functioning
- Station code: SVHE
- Zone(s): South Western Railway zone
- Division(s): Hubballi

Services
Preceding station	Indian Railways	Following station
Navalgund Road towards ?	South Western Railway zone Guntakal–Vasco da Gama section	Hebsur towards ?
Location
- Interactive map

Sisvinhalli railway station is a railway station located on the Guntakal–Vasco da Gama line operated by the South Western Railway zone under Hubballi railway division. It is situated beside State Highway 28 at Shishuvinahalli in Dharwad district in the Indian state of Karnatak.
