= Kuknur =

Kuknoor Kukanooru
- Town
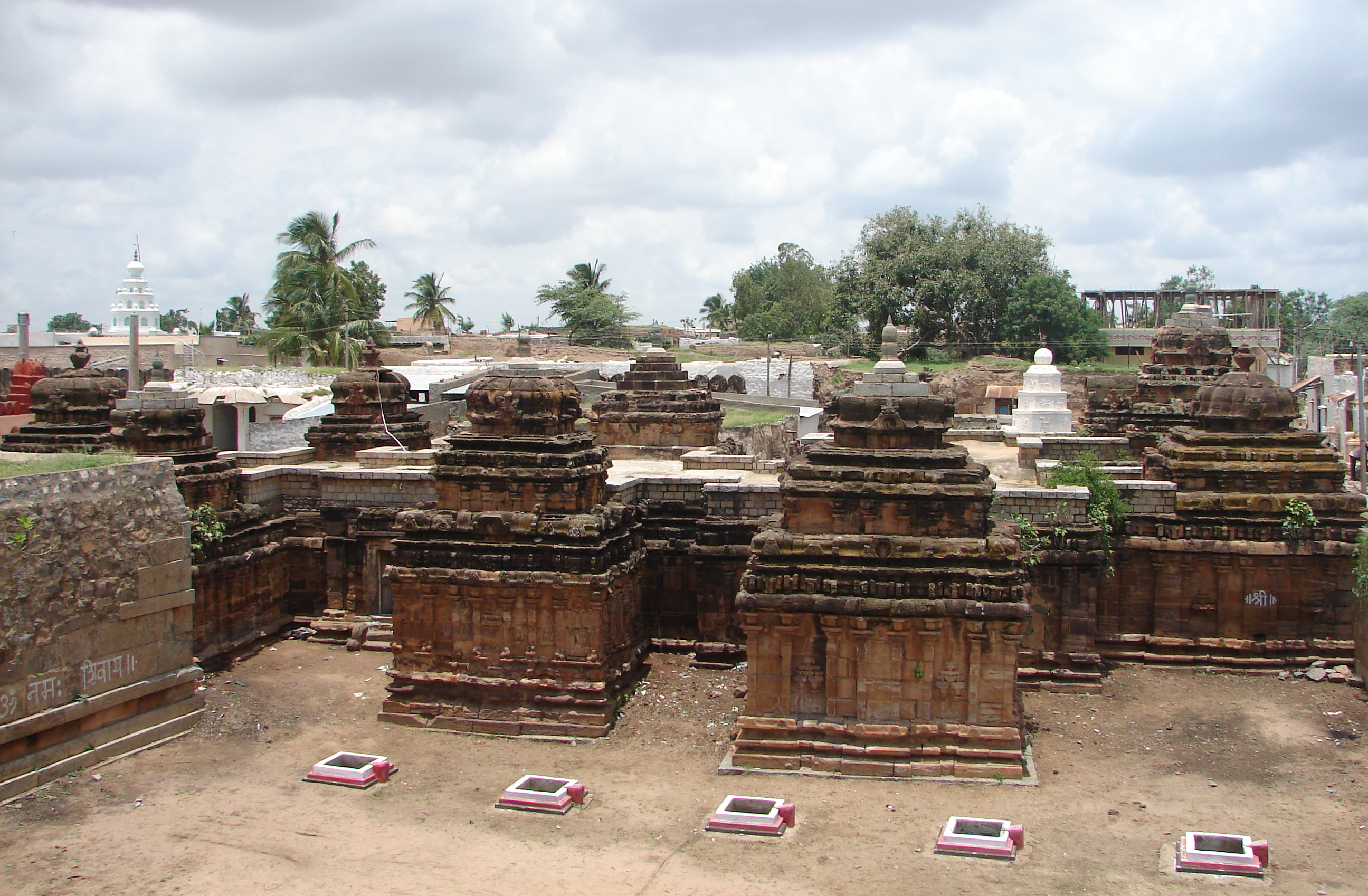
- Navalinga Temples

- Location in Karnataka, India Kuknoor (India)
- Coordinates: 15°29′23″N 75°59′38″E
- Country: India
- State: Karnataka
- District: Koppal
- Named for: Kuntalpura

Population (2001)
  - Total: 15,718

Languages
  - Official: Kannada
- Time zone: UTC+5:30 (IST)
- PIN: 583232
- Telephone code: 08534
- Vehicle registration: KA 37
- Nearest city: Koppal
- Lok Sabha constituency: Koppal
- Vidhan Sabha constituency: Yelburga
- Climate: Tropical (Köppen Aw )
- Website: www.yelburgatown.gov.in/tourism

Kuknoor (also known as Kuknur, Kukkanuru or Kukanoor) is a town in Kukanoor taluk in the Koppal District of the Indian state of Karnataka, which is located about 40 km northwest of Hospet and 7 km from the Mahadeva Temple in Itagi. Kuknoor is known for the temples of the Rashtrakutas and Chalukyas in the town, with the most notable being the Navalinga Temple.

== History ==
Kuknoor was an important town during the Middle Ages, and features many historical ruins, including those of the Navalinga Temples that were completed in the later Chalukya style of architecture during the 8th to 13th centuries A.D. Other important sites include the Kalleshvara and Mallikarjuna temples.

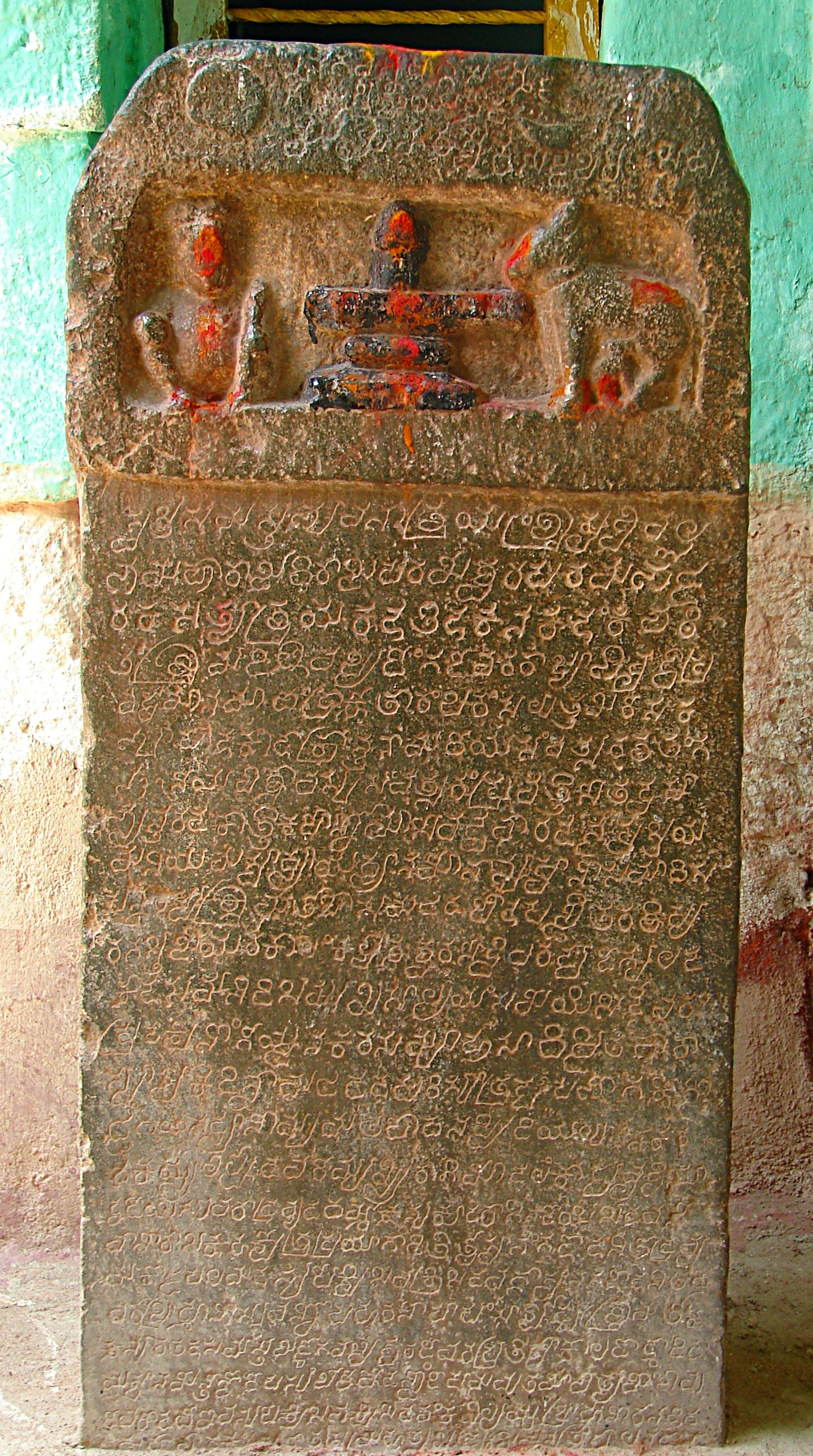
Old Kannada inscription at Navalinga Temple

== Demographics ==
As of the 2011 Census of India, Kuknoor had a population of 18,033, constituting 9,075 males and 8,958 females.

== Temples ==
Kuknur is home to several important temples.

=== Mahamaya Temple ===
Mahamaya Temple is located in the center of the town, and is mentioned in the Indian epic Mahabharata. The temple has three deities in the Garbhagriha. Two of the deities are female: Mahakali & Mahamaya, and one male: Kshetrapala. All 3 statues face south, in contrast to the regular orientation towards the north. Statues like these, which face south are often considered to be more powerful.

This temple was mentioned in the Mahabharata, which suggests it was constructed before the 8th century B.C. According to legend, there exists a hidden underground temple dedicated to Kali below the Mahamaya Temple. This temple plays a role in the events of the epic, as it practices Narabali, a type of human sacrifice. In modern history, there were plans to unearth it, however they were cancelled after villagers protested, citing the possible release of evil spirits if it were to be uncovered.

=== Gudneshwar Temple ===
Located near Kuknoor and surrounded by Tamarind trees, the Gudneshwar (Rudramunishwar) Temple is dedicated to Rudramunishwar, a figure who practiced social welfare work during the 12th century and was later known as Gudneshwar. He has travelled across many places in Karnataka to spread spirituality and social awareness.

Gurbha Gudi in Mahamaya Temple

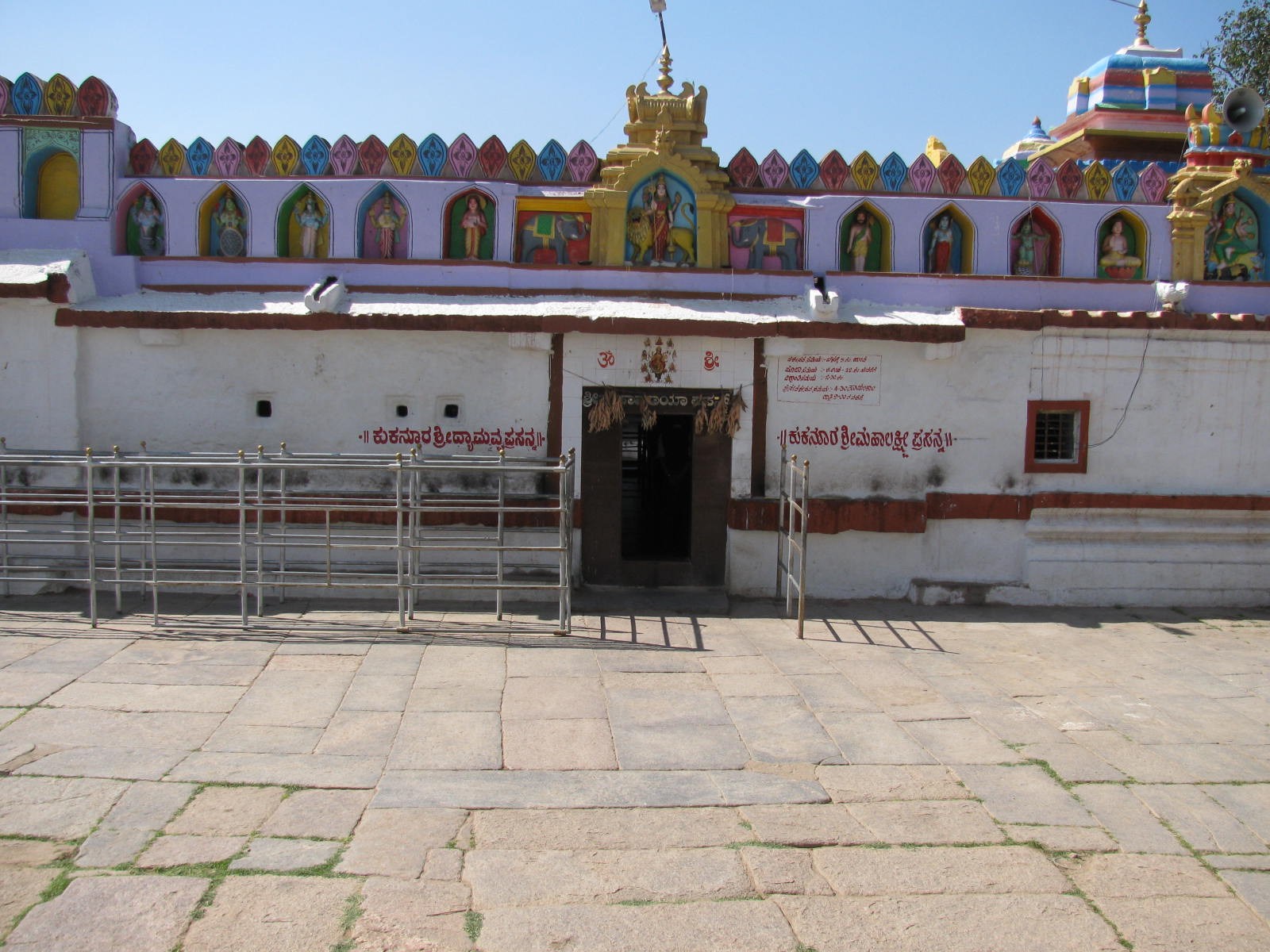
Navalinga Temple courtyard

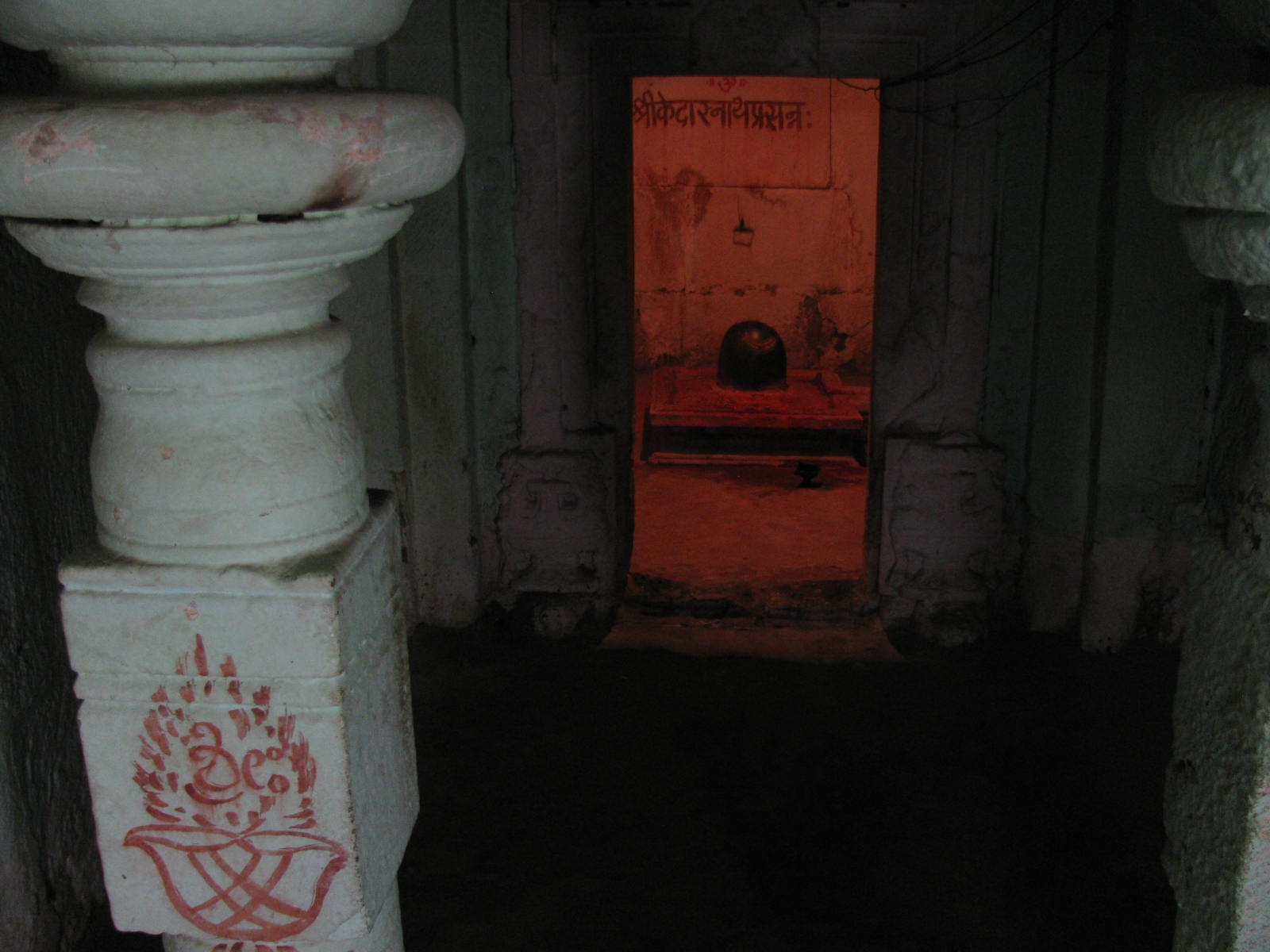
Navalinga Temple interior

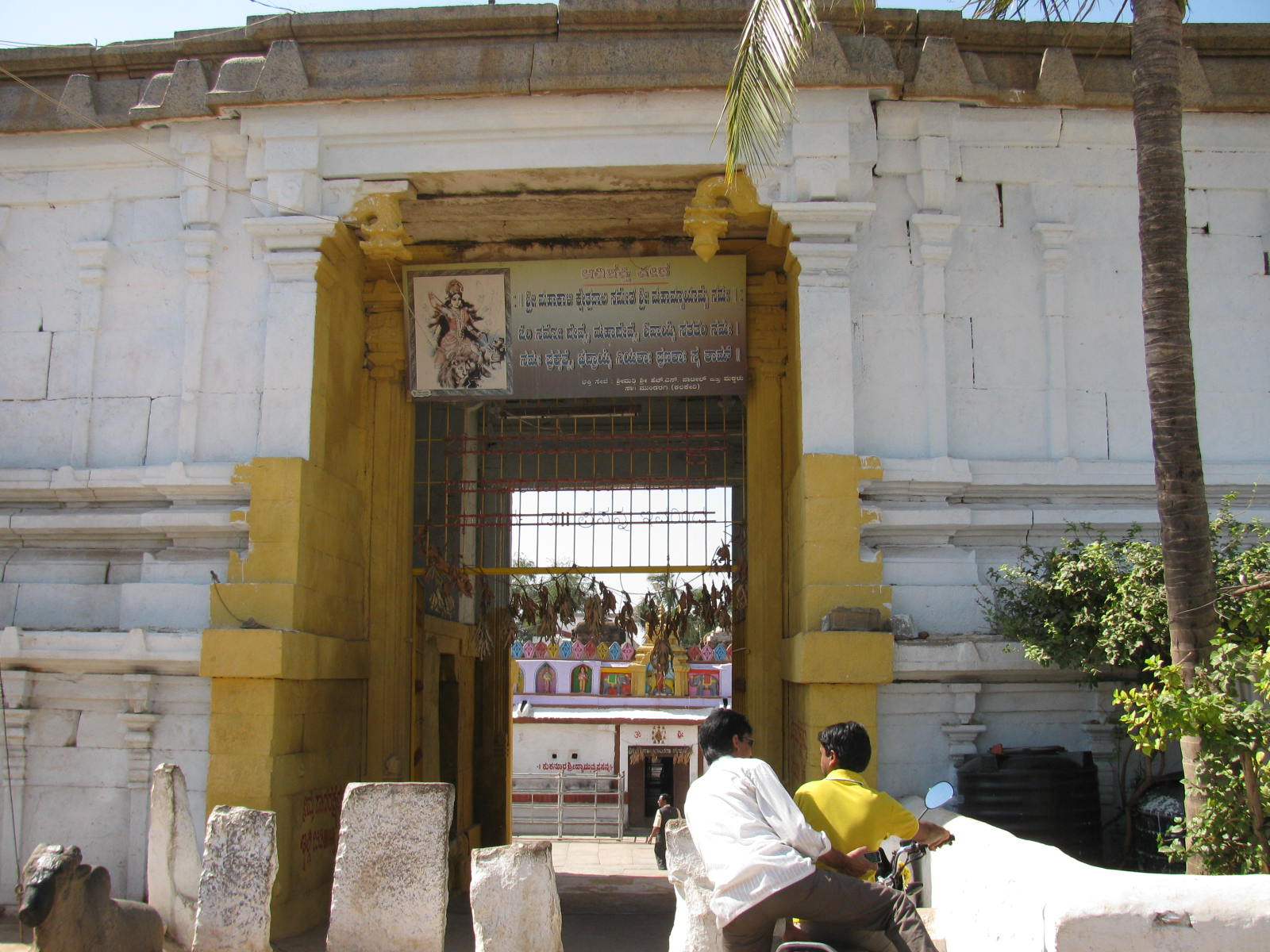
Navalinga Temple gate

== Education ==
=== Jawahar Navodaya Vidyalaya, Kuknoor ===
Jawahar Navodaya Vidyalaya (JNV) Kuknoor is located near Gudneppanamath and is a premier educational institution. It is funded by the Government of India's Ministry of Human Resource Development. It was established in 1987 to provide education to rural students in Raichur district. The campus covers 35 acres in Kuknoor. The school is affiliated with India’s Central Board of Secondary Education and provides for grades 6-12.

=== Vidyananda Gurukul Educational trust, Kukanoor ===
This trust is located in Kukanoor, Yelburga Main road. It was founded by RB DESAI in 1921. This institute contains both Kannada and English Medium School 1st to 10th, Diploma, PUC and Degree. It has buildings, infrastructure, a garden and a play ground.

== Kuknoor Granite ==
Himalayan Blue Granite is mined in quarries in and around Kuknoor.

== Transport ==
Kuknoor is well connected by road to Koppal, Yelburga, and Gadag-Betageri. The nearest major airport is in Hubli.

=== Bus ===
The nearby city of Koppal provides bus service to major cities such as Bangalore, Hubli, Hyderabad, Bagalkot, and others. Karnataka State Road Transport Corporation (KSRTC) has a bus depot in Kuknoor that runs service to other cities and villages.

=== Rail ===
Kuknoor has a railway station (Kukanur railway station). It was inaugurated in 2025. Other nearby railway station is Koppal railway station. It is 25 km away.

== See also ==
- Koppal District
- Mahadeva Temple (Itagi)
- Gajendragad
- Sudi
- Lakkundi
- Gadag
- North Karnataka
- Tourism in North Karnataka
