= Brahmagiri archaeological site =

Archaeological site in Karnataka, India

Coordinates: 14°48′50″N 76°48′23″E

Brahmagiri is an archaeological site located in the Chitradurga district of the state of Karnataka, India. Legend has it that this is the site where sage Gautama Maharishi (also spelt Gauthama Maharshi) and his wife Ahalya lived. He was one among seven noted Hindu saints (Saptharshi mandalam). This site was first explored by Benjamin L. Rice in 1891, who discovered rock edicts of Emperor Ashoka here. These rock edicts indicated that the locality was termed as Isila and denoted the southernmost extent of the Mauryan empire. The Brahmagiri site is a granite outcrop elevated about 180 m. above the surrounding plains and measures around 500 m east-west and 100 m north-south. It is well known for the large number of megalithic monuments that have been found here. The earliest settlement found here has been dated to at least the 2nd millennium BC.

== Excavation history ==
In 1947, Mortimer Wheeler further excavated the site on behalf of the Archaeological Survey of India. The region was excavated again in 1956 by Seshadri and by Amalananda Ghosh in 1965 and 1978.

== Architectural significance ==
Excavation has revealed medieval stone temples, pottery, terracota beads and figurines, semiprecious stones and megalithic structures. There have been traces of cultures: Microlithic, Neolithic, Iron Age, Maurya and Chalukya-Hoysala. Amlanandan Ghosh named the microlithic culture as Roppa culture after the Roppa village within which the microlithic trench was located. He also found out that the neoliths found in this region were evidence of the occupation of this region by farming-herding communities in the pre-megalithic period.

In 1947, Mortimer Wheeler did further excavations at Brahmagiri, found ten domestic structures and classified them as belonging to a sequence of three cultural periods: Period I - Neolithic or Neolithic-Chalcolithic, Period II - Megalithic and Period III - an early historical culture. Brahmagiri was identified to contain a mortuary of 300 tombs with burials made in rectangular cists, cist-circles (stones surrounding granite cists) and pit-circles. The cists also included artefacts like vessels with graffiti, stone beads and iron and copper tools.

=== Period I (Neolithic) ===
Wheeler dated this period to belong within the range 1st millennium B.C. to 2nd century B.C. The objects found in this period included a large number of polished stone axes made of dolerite, microliths like crescents, gravers and blades made of jasper, agate carnelian and opal, and ornaments worn by humans like bronze rings and beads of magnesite, agate and shell. Handmade vessels made of coarse grey fabric and with shapes like globular vase, shallow bowl and spouted bowl were also found. The infants who died in this period, had their body folded and were buried in urns while the adults were buried in pits in an extended way.

=== Period II (Megalithic) ===
Wheeler dated this period to belong within the range 2nd century B.C. to the middle of 1st century A. D. It was found that the humans who inhabited Brahmagiri during this period used iron for agricultural tools like sickles and for weapons like spears, swords and arrowheads. Pottery of this period were made in shapes like hemi-spherical deep bowl, funnel shaped lid, shallow dish and three-legged pots among others. The vessels appear in three kinds of fabrics: polished black and red ware, all-black ware, and bright and coarse dull-red ware. The burials in this period were done in stone cists or excavated pits which were surrounded by boulders arranged in the shape of a circle or concentric circles. The cists also contained funeral pots and objects like iron implements and beads.

=== Period III ===
Wheeler dated this period to belong within the range 2nd century B.C. to the middle of 1st century A. D. In this period, sophisticated pottery was made using fast wheels. The vessels were made in shapes like shallow dish, cups and vases, coated in a russet colour and painted with geometrical designs in white colour. Ornaments found included bangles of shell, clay, bones, glass and gold, and beads of magnesite, agate, carnelian and terracotta.

Recent archaeological studies in Brahmagiri identified multiple natural rock shelter inhabited by the humans and left with rock art panels assigned to the period of Iron Age. New archaeological features such as cupules are also discovered on megaliths and granite boulders.

== Other megalithic sites in Karnataka ==
- Morera Thatte
- Sidlaphadi
- Sanganakallu
- Kupgal petroglyphs
- Hirebenkal
- Khyad
- Kupgal petroglyphs
- Sonda
- Byse
- Anegundi
- South Asian Stone Age
- Archaeology in India
- Timeline of Indian history
- List of Indus Valley Civilisation sites
- List of archaeological sites by country § India
- List of archaeological sites by continent and age
- World Heritage Sites by country § India
