= Sidlaphadi =

Megalithic site in Karnataka, India

Sidlaphadi Sidlaphadi, Badami
- city
- Location in Karnataka, India
- Coordinates: 15°56′37″N 75°42′05″E
- Country: India
- State: Karnataka
- District: Bagalkot

Languages
  - Official: Kannada
- Time zone: UTC+5:30 (IST)
- PIN: 587 201
- Telephone code: 08357

Sidlaphadi near Badami in Karnataka, is a natural rock bridge and prehistoric rock shelter. It is located at about four km. in the middle of a shrub jungle near the historic town of Badami. A bridle and kutcha path through sandstone hills from Badami leads to Sidlaphadi and there is no metal road to the spot. Sidlaphadi literally means in Kannada the Rock of lightning, derived from gaping holes in the natural rock arch, which was formed when a lightning struck. The natural rock bridge structure looks like a wide arch between two sandstone boulders (served as a roof). The rock structure has large, gaping holes in the arch and allows sunlight to enter inside which provides the required light for interiors. It was also a shelter for hunter-gatherer prehistoric people.

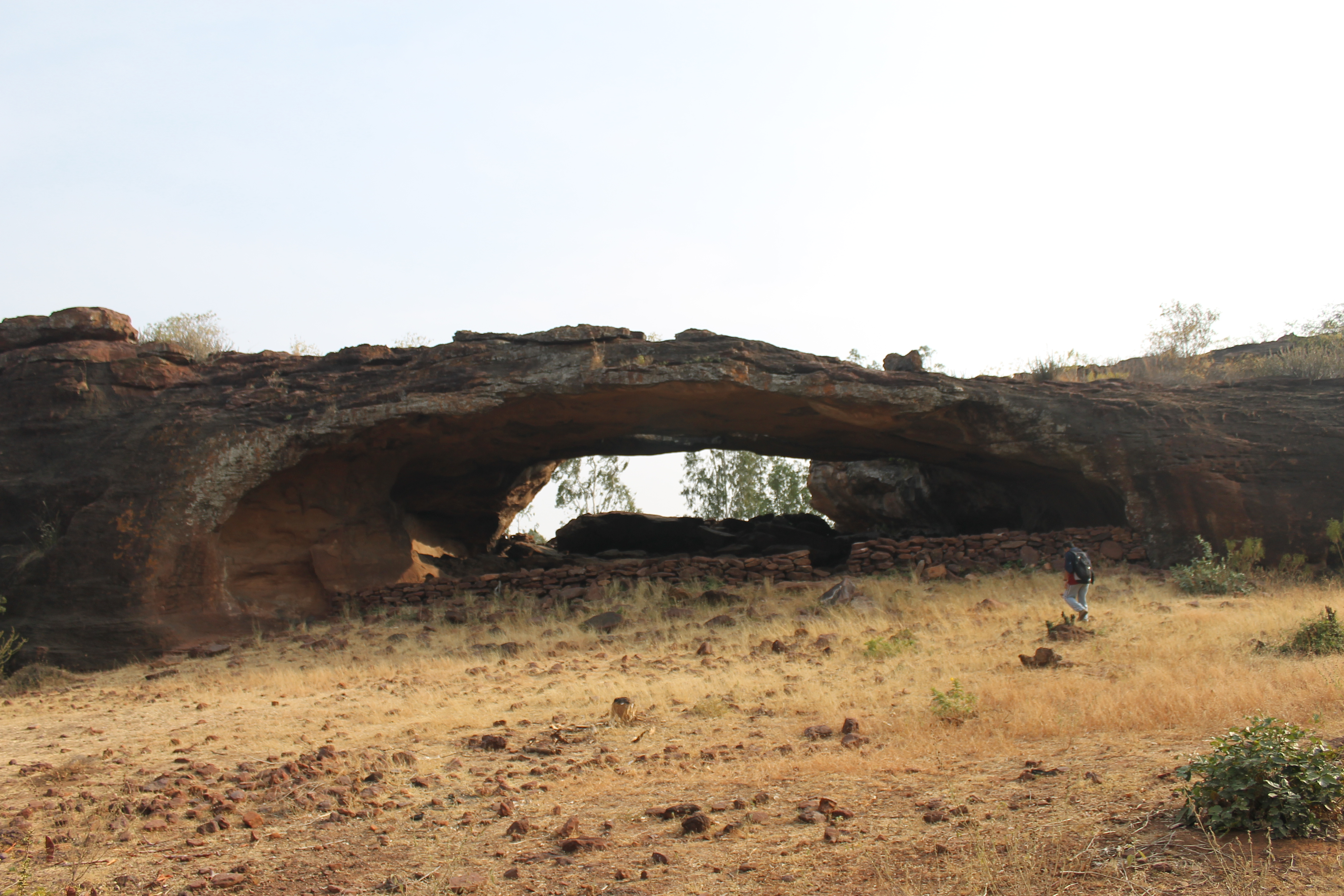

There is a replica of Sidlaphadi in the Badami archaeological museum, it is dedicated to recreate Sidlaphadi and has posters to provide relevant information about the evolution of man.

There are evidences to prove that the Sidlaphadi was a dwelling of prehistoric man.

== Prehistoric rock art ==
This natural rock bridge structure was studied by archaeologist Shri A. Sundara, who identified prehistoric (now fading) paintings on the roof of the arch. The blunt weapons of stone were also discovered in the area.Dr. R. Mohana has discovered more prehistoric rock art pictures in and around Sidla Phadi.

== Ancient markers pointing to Sidlaphadi ==
An artificially carved ancient petroglyph in one of the minor caves of the Badami cave clusters, acts as a miniature replica of Sidlaphadi. The petroglyph consists of an oval depression in the bed rock joined by a cylindrical bridge with a natural fissure on its left. Additionally, the axis of the miniature bridge points accurately in the direction of the rock arch. It is quite possible that this replica was used as a directional marker to locate Sidlaphadi.

== Other megalithic sites in Karnataka ==
- Hirebenkal
- Sanganakallu
- Kupgal petroglyphs
- Sonda
- Byse
- Anegundi
- Khyad
- Brahmagiri archaeological site
- Morera Thatte
- Prehistoric rock art
- South Asian Stone Age

== See also ==
- Archaeology in India
- Timeline of Indian history
- List of Indus Valley Civilisation sites
- List of archaeological sites by country#India
- World Heritage Sites by country#India
