= Archaeology of India =

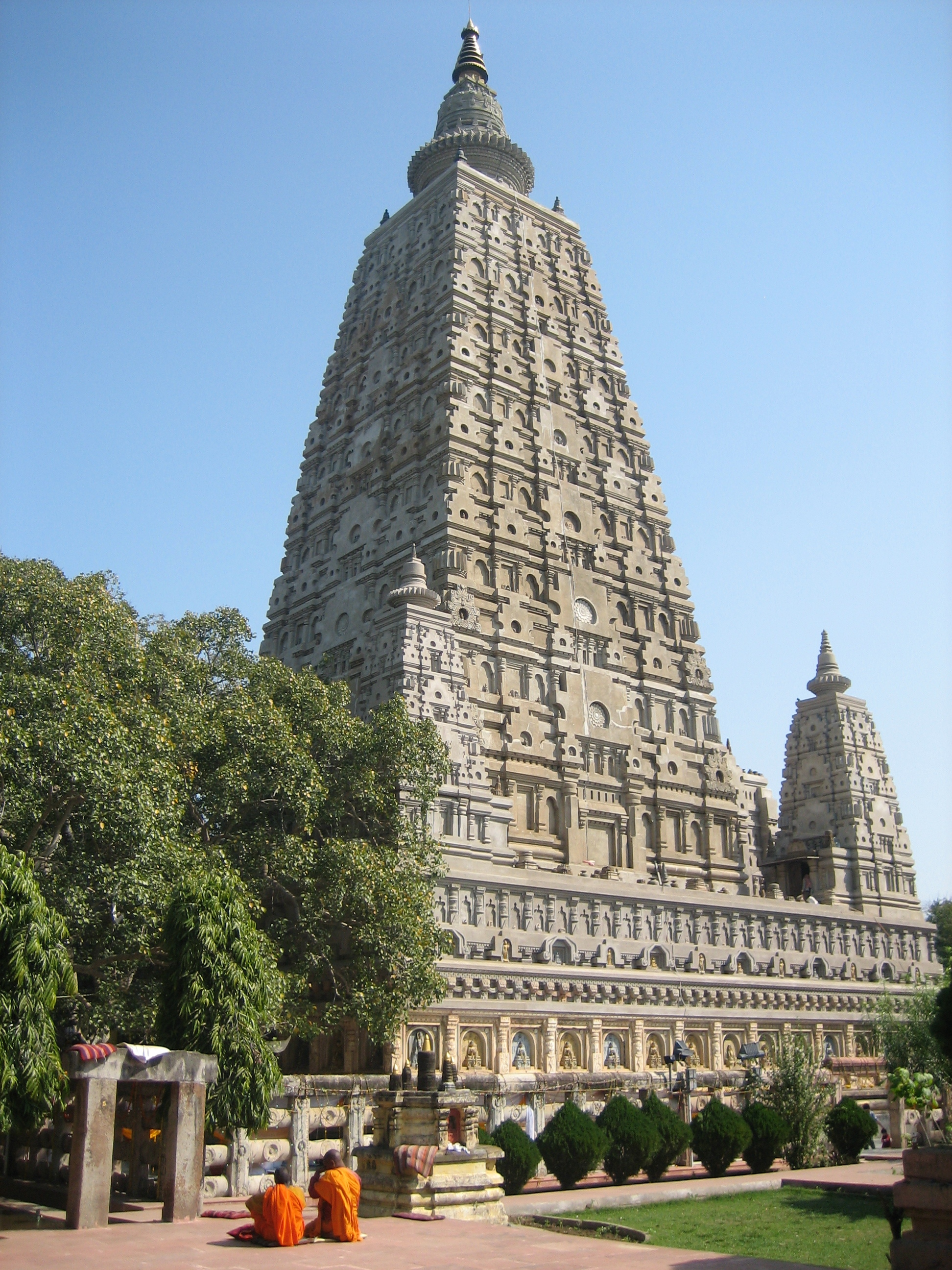
The Mahabodhi Temple in Bodhgaya, India, which is the alleged place of enlightenment of the Buddha. It remains one of India's most important archaeological sites.

Archaeology in India is mainly done under the supervision of the Archaeological Survey of India.

== History ==
12th century Indian scholar Kalhana's writings involved recording of local traditions, examining manuscripts, inscriptions, coins and architectures, which is described as one of the earliest traces of archaeology. One of his notable work is called Rajatarangini which was completed in c.1150 and is described as one of the first history books of India.

=== Origin of modern archaeology ===
One of the earliest non-Indian scholars to take an interest in the archaeology of the Indian subcontinent were Western European travelers in the 16th, 17th and early 18th centuries. The earliest European written accounts of India's ancient monuments and Hindu temples were produced by sailors and travelers in the 16th, 17th and early 18th centuries CE. Some of these accounts included ground plans and drawings of the buildings, however they lacked any historical discussion of their origins, with the exception of several references to Alexander the Great, the Macedonian emperor, who tried and failed to conquer India in the fourth century BCE.

Some notable archaeological sites in India include Rakhigarhi, an archaeological site located in the state of Haryana, India. Mohenjo-Daro and Harappa are also ancient archaeological sites that were once a part of India, but now lie within the borders of Pakistan. The Harappan civilization was also called the Indus River Valley Civilization.

=== Alexander Cunningham and Archaeological Survey of India ===
Scholarly investigation into Indian archaeology was largely influenced by Alexander Cunningham, who became the first director of the Archaeological Survey of India, which was established in 1861. Cunningham along with various assistants visited many sites and monuments of archaeological importance in India. Their trips ranged from simply visiting sites to study and report on to excavations as well. Thomas R. Trautmann and Carla M. Sinopoli notes that the archaeological survey was first established by colonial British government.

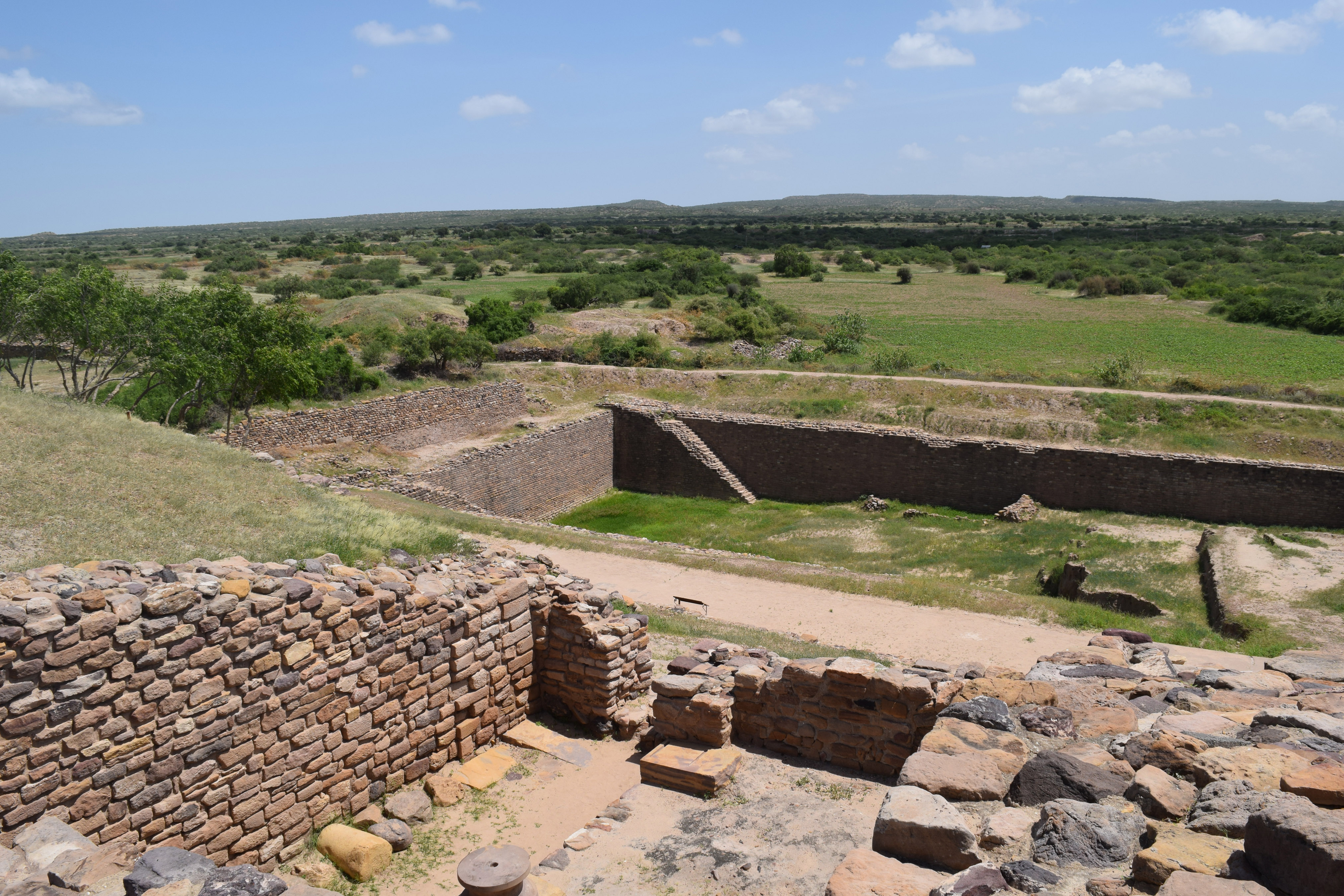
Archeological site of Dholavira in Gujarat, India

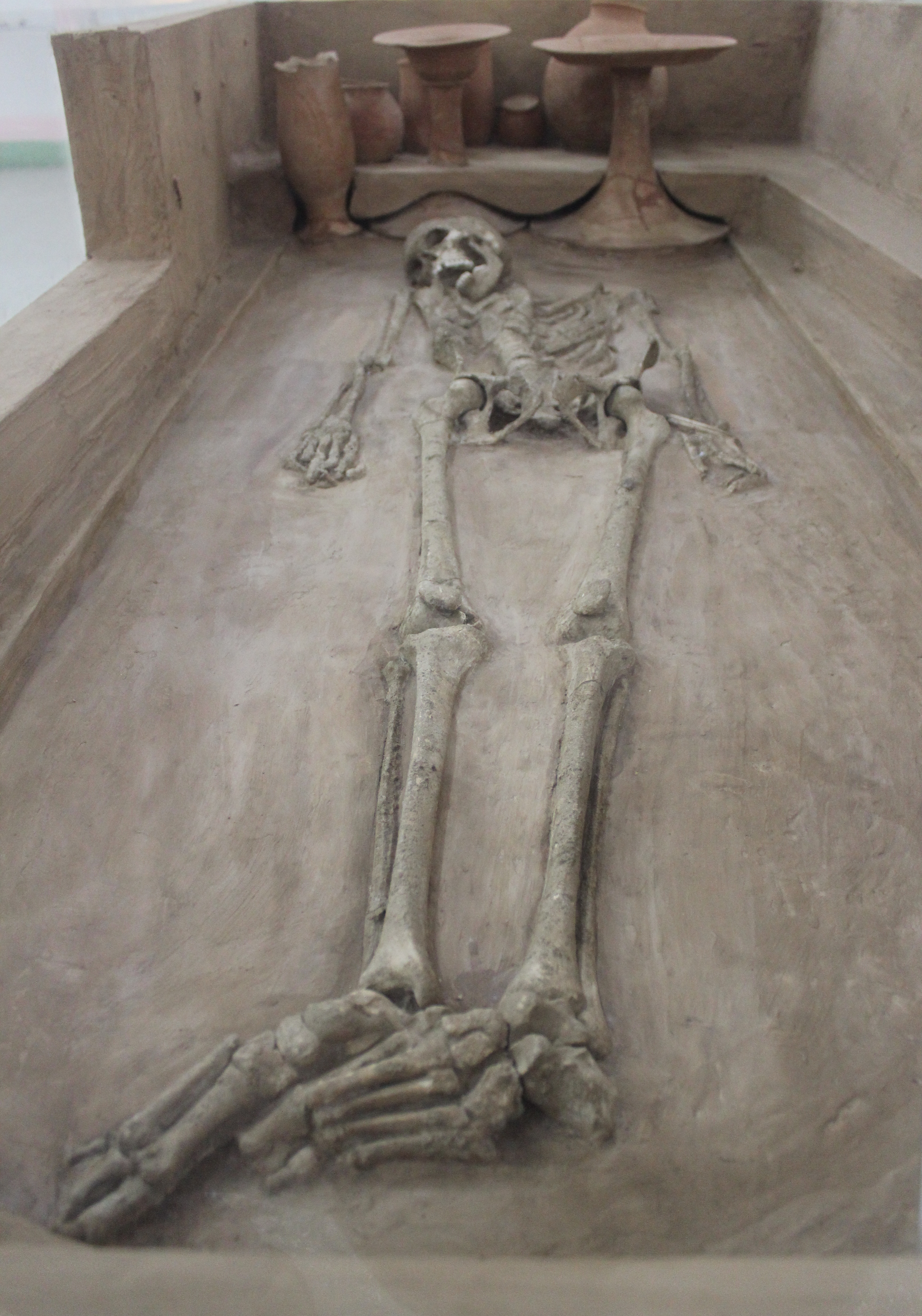
Burial from Rahigarhi/Rakhigarhi site in Harayana, India. It is now preserved in National Museum.

== Paleolithic archaeological sites (2,500,000–250,000 BC) ==
Palaeolithic sites in India are characterised by the Madrasian culture and Soanian culture. Bhimbetka rock shelters is also a Paleolithic (Old Stone Age) and Mesolithic (Middle Stone Age) site.

== Mesolithic sites (250,000 BC–10,000 BC) ==
Anangpur Caves (Faridabad) and Mangar Bani Caves (Gurugram) in Delhi NCR, Bhimbetka rock shelters (Bhopal) and Pahargarh Caves (Morena) IN Madhya Pradesh have continuity of Paleolithic to Mesolithic phase.

== Neolithic sites (10,800–3300 BC) ==
Neolithic sites in India are characterised by the Bhirrana culture (7570–6200 BC), Mehrgarh culture (7000–3300 BC) and Edakkal culture (5000–3000 BC).

Marine archaeology in the Gulf of Khambat,

Sanganakallu, Kupgal petroglyphs, Sonda rock art, dwellings of Anegundi are neolithic sites. Brahmagiri archaeological site has neolithic and mesolithic phases.

== Chalcolithic (Copper age) archaeological sites (3500–1500 BC) ==
=== Chalcolithic cultures ===
Chalcolithic sites in India are characterised by the following cultures.

- Anarta tradition (c. 3950–1900 BC)
- Ahar-Banas culture (3000–1500 BC)
- Pandu culture (1600–1500 BC)
- Malwa culture (1600–1300 BC)
- Daimabad site
- Jorwe culture (1400–700 BC)

=== Megalithic archaeological sites of India ===
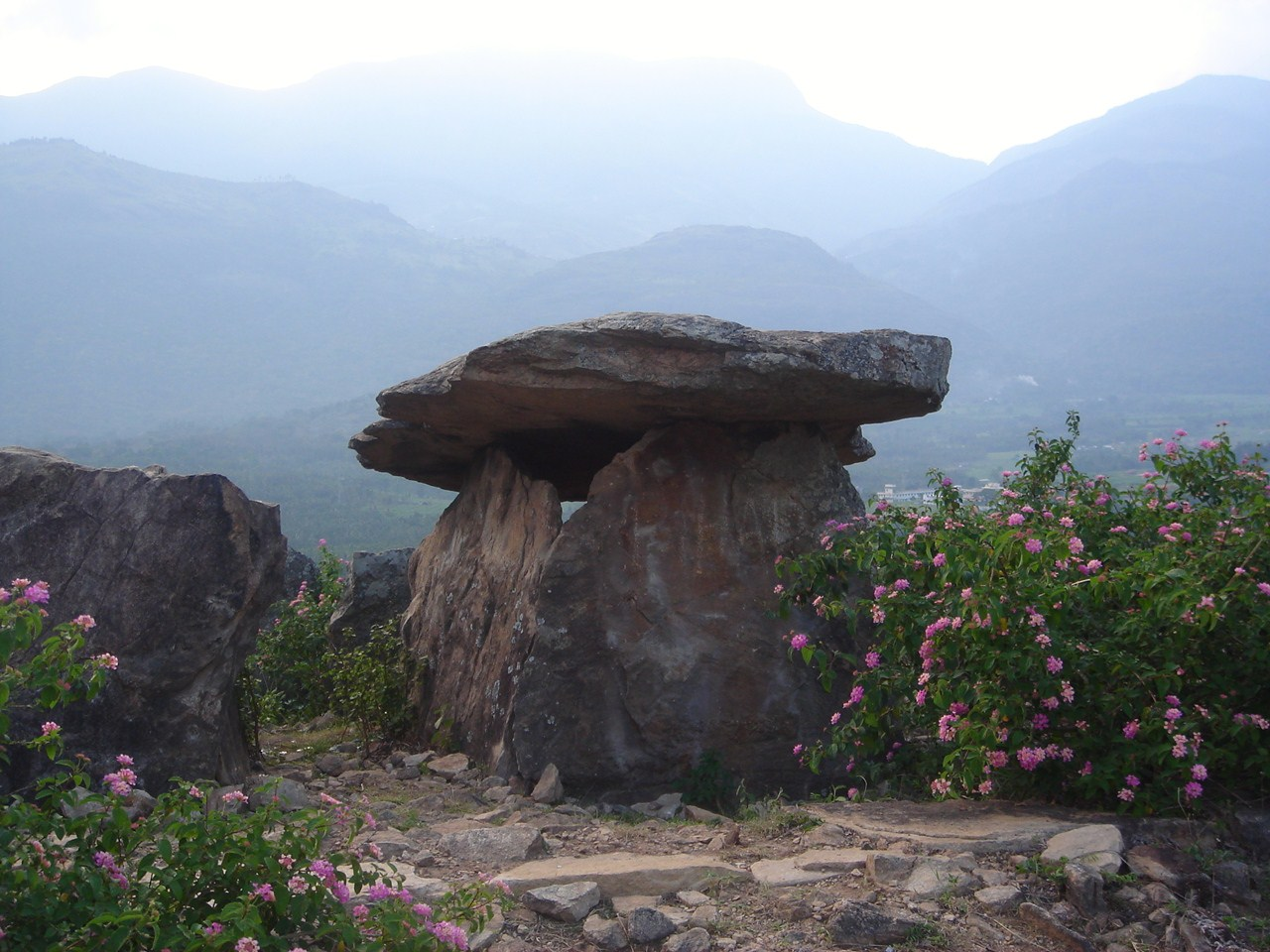
Megalithic dolem in Marayoor, Kerala

Megaliths in India date back to 5000 BC in southern India, before 3000 BC in upper Indus valley in northern India, and megaliths in eastern India are of much later date.

==== Types of megaliths ====
Megaliths, made of large stones, are man-made structures.

Based on the "structural design" megaliths are classified as either monolith or polylithic.:

- Monolithic structures: are single large stones standing vertically, which have following 2 sub-types.
  - Menhir: are vertically standing stone, usually found across all continents.
  - Stone circles: are vertically standing several stones, standing separate from each other with no physical contact with each other, to form circle, semi circle or ellipse.
- Polylithic structures are made of several large stones in physical contact with each other, these are of following 3 sub-types:
  - Dolmen: megalith which is made in single chamber tomb, usually consisting of three or more upright stones supporting a large flat horizontal capstone.
  - Cairn: a man-made pile of stones, often in conical form, raised either as sepulchral monuments or for astronomical use, these range from simple small piles of loose stones to architecturally complex arrangements.
  - Cist: encasements for dead bodies, in which presence of ornaments shows the wealth or importance of the dead, usually found in groups or close to cairns.

Based on the "usage type" megaliths are classified as

- Non-sepulchral: not-used for burial, but have ceremonial usage such as worship.
- Sepulchral: used for burial. Many of these sites are associated with burial or post burial rituals which may have been connected with ancestor worship, including memorials for those whose remains may or may not be available. There is another distinct class of megaliths that are not associated with burials.

==== List of megalithic sites in India ====
In India, megaliths of all kinds are noted; these vary from chamber tomb, stone alignment and anthropomorphic figures as well as the following:

- Dolmens in India
- Menhirs in India,
- Indian rock-cut architecture burial sites.

==== Megalithic monuments by states ====
Megaliths are found across whole of India, but there are found in higher numbers in central, southern and eastern India.

Man-made megalithic monuments in India include Anegundi, Byse rock art, Chovvanur burial cave, Hirapur dolmen, Hire Benakal, Kudakkallu Parambu, Sidlaphadi.

===== Maharashtra =====
In Maharashtra, megaliths are found in Vidharba and south Maharashtra. The megaliths found in south Maharashtra are of varied types, such as head stones alone, or rock chambers and even dolmen. Megaliths in Vidarbha regions are burial sites marked by stone circles. Important megalithic sites of Vidarbha are Hirapur dolmens, Stone circles of Junapani sepulchral megaliths of basalt rocks with remains of the dead 10 km (6.2 mi) northwest of Nagpur, Mahurjhari Stone Circles with are 200 megalithic stone circles 15 km (9.3 mi) northwest of Nagpur, Naikund with evidence of iron smelting 35 km (22 mi) north of Nagpur, and Takalghat Khapa 34 km (21 mi) south of Nagpur. In Vidharba, the Naikund, Mahurjhari, Borgaon 40 km (25 mi) southwest of Nagpur and Khairwada 80 km (50 mi) west of Nagpur megalithic sites have been excavated.

Gorewada Stone Circles in Nagpur, connected to both Junapani and Mahurzari civilisation, are India's largest stone circle and it has the highest number of circular stones in India. Kherwadi in Wardha district has 1500 cairns burials, which are connected to Gorewada burial ground.

Pottery found at these sites belongs to Black and red ware (BRW) (10,800–3300 BC). In the Western Ganges plain (western Uttar Pradesh) it is dated to c. 1450–1200 BCE, and is succeeded by the Painted Grey Ware culture; whereas in the Central and Eastern Ganges plain (eastern Uttar Pradesh, Bihar, and Bengal) and Central India (Madhya Pradesh) the BRW appears during the same period but continues for longer, until c. 700–500 BCE, when it is succeeded by the Northern Black Polished Ware culture.

===== Mizoram =====
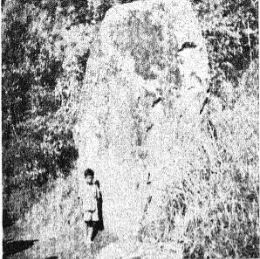
Mangkhaia Lung

Mizoram has numerous dolmen and menhir megaliths.

== Bronze Age archaeological sites (3300–1300 BC) ==
Bronze Age India in the Indian subcontinent begins around 3000 BCE, and it was succeeded by the Iron Age in India beginning in around 1400 BCE. Bronze Age sites include Hire Benakal.

=== Indus Valley Civilisation (IVC) ===
In the prehistory of the Indian subcontinent, the Iron Age in India cultures are the Painted Grey Ware culture (1300 to 300 BCE) and the Northern Black Polished Ware (700 to 200 BCE), the later corresponds to the transition of the Vedic period Janapada principalities to the sixteen Mahajanapadas region-states of the early historic period, culminating in the emergence of the Maurya Empire towards the end of the period.

==== Phases of IVC ====
Phases of IVC

- Early Harappan culture (3300–2600 BC)
- Mature Harappan culture (2600–1900 BC)
- Late Harappan culture (1900–1300 BC)

==== IVC burial sites ====
More than 50 IVC burial sites have been found, among those main sites in India are Rakhigarhi (first site with genetic testing) and Farmana in Haryana, Sanauli in Uttar Pradesh, Kalibangan in Rajasthan, Lothal and Dholavira in Gujarat. Other IVC burial sites outside India have been found in Pakistan in Mehrgarh, Harappa, and Mohenjo-daro.

==== Main IVC sites ====
===== Rakhigarhi =====
In 1963, the Archaeological Survey of India (ASI) began excavations at this site, and, though little has been published about the excavations. Further excavations were conducted the ASI headed by the archaeologist, Amarendra Nath, between 1997 and 2000. (Note: Amarendra Nath was later found guilty for forging bills during the excavation at Rakhigarhi.) The more recent excavations have been performed by Vasant Shinde, an archaeologist from the Deccan College.

Analysis and mapping of this site has shown it to be even larger than Mohenjo Daro. Radiocarbon dating was used at this site to analyze soil samples. The results showed that the soil samples were dated back to the millennium of 2000 years BC.

=== Bronze Age: Vedic Civilisation (2000–1500 BC) ===
Early Vedic Civilisation, which falls in the Bronze Age, is characterised to the following cultures:

- Copper Hoard culture (2500–1600 BC)
- Swat culture (1600–500 BC)

== Iron Age archaeological sites (1500–200 BC) ==
=== Iron Age north India: Vedic Civilisation (1500–500 BC) ===
Vedic Civilisation which originated in Bronze Age, evolved through the following stages in the Iron Age:

- Janapadas (1500–600 BC)
- Black and Red ware culture (1300–1000 BC)
- Painted Grey Ware culture (1200–600 BC)
- Northern Black Polished Ware (700–200 BC)
- Pradyota Dynasty (799–684 BC)
- Haryanka Dynasty (684–424 BC)
- Three Crowned Kingdoms (c. 600 BC – AD 1600)
- Maha Janapadas (c. 600–300 BC)

=== Iron Age south India ===
Iron Age sites in south India are Adichanallur in Tamil Nadu, Hallur in Haveri district of Karnataka, Keezhadi excavation site

=== Early to mid Middle Ages archaeological sites (500 BC – 1,000) ===
- Achaemenid Empire (550–330 BC)
- Nanda Empire (380–321 BC)
- Macedonian Empire (330–323 BC)
- Maurya Empire (321–184 BC)

== Middle Kingdoms archaeological sites (230 BC – AD 1206) ==
Following were either largest in area and/or longest reigning or had watershed moment impact:

- Satavahana Empire (230 BC – AD 220)
- Shunga Empire (185–73 BC)
- Indo-Greek Kingdom (180 BC – AD 10)
- Indo-Scythian Kingdom (50 BC – AD 400)
- Indo-Parthian Kingdom (AD 21 – c. 130)
- Kushan Empire (AD 60–240)
- Vakataka Empire (c. 250 – c. 500)
- Kalabhras Empire (c. 250 – c. 600)
- Gupta Empire (280–550)
- Western Ganga Kingdom (350–1000)
- Kamarupa Kingdom (350–1100)
- Maitraka Empire (475–767)
- Kabul Shahi Empire (c. 500 – 1026)
- Harsha Empire (606–647)
- Chalukya Empire (543–753, 942–1244)
- Western Chalukya Empire (973–1189)
- Eastern Chalukya Kingdom (624–1075)
- Gurjara-Pratihara Empire (550–1036)
- Guhila dynasty (551-1947)
- Pala Empire (750–1174)
- Rashtrakuta Empire (753–982)
- Paramara Kingdom (800–1327)
- Yadava Empire (850–1334)
- Kachhwaha dynasty (947-1947)
- Lohara Kingdom (1003–1320)
- Eastern Ganga Empire (1078–1434)
- Zamorin Kingdom (1102–1766)
- Kalachuris of Tripuri (675-1210)
- Chutiya Kingdom (1187–1673)

== Late medieval archaeological sites (1206–1526) ==
The sites related to the following:

- Delhi Sultanate (1206–1526)
- Ahom kingdom (1228–1826)
- Chitradurga Kingdom (1300–1779)
- Reddy Kingdom (1325–1448)
- Vijayanagara Empire (1336–1646)

== Early modern archaeological sites (1526–1858) ==
Some of the main sites are related to the

- Mughal Empire (1526–1858)
- Madurai Kingdom (1559–1736)
- Thanjavur Kingdom (1532–1673)
- Sikkim Kingdom (1642–1975)
- Maratha Empire (1674–1818)
- Misl (1707–1799)
- Sikh Empire (1799–1849)
- Travancore Kingdom (1729–1947)

== Colonial archaeological sites (1510–1961) ==
The sites are related to the following colonial rulers:

- Portuguese India (1510–1961)
- Dutch India (1605–1825)
- Danish India (1620–1869)
- French India (1759–1954)
- Company Raj (1757–1858)
- British Raj (1858–1947)

== See also ==
- Archaeological Survey of India
- Timeline of Indian history
- List of Indus Valley Civilisation sites
- List of archaeological sites by country#India
- World Heritage Sites by country#India
- Pottery in the Indian subcontinent
