= Hire Benakal =

Megalithic necropolis

Hirebeṇakal ಹಿರೇಬೆಣಕಲ್ಲು (Hirebenakallu) Hirebeṇakal
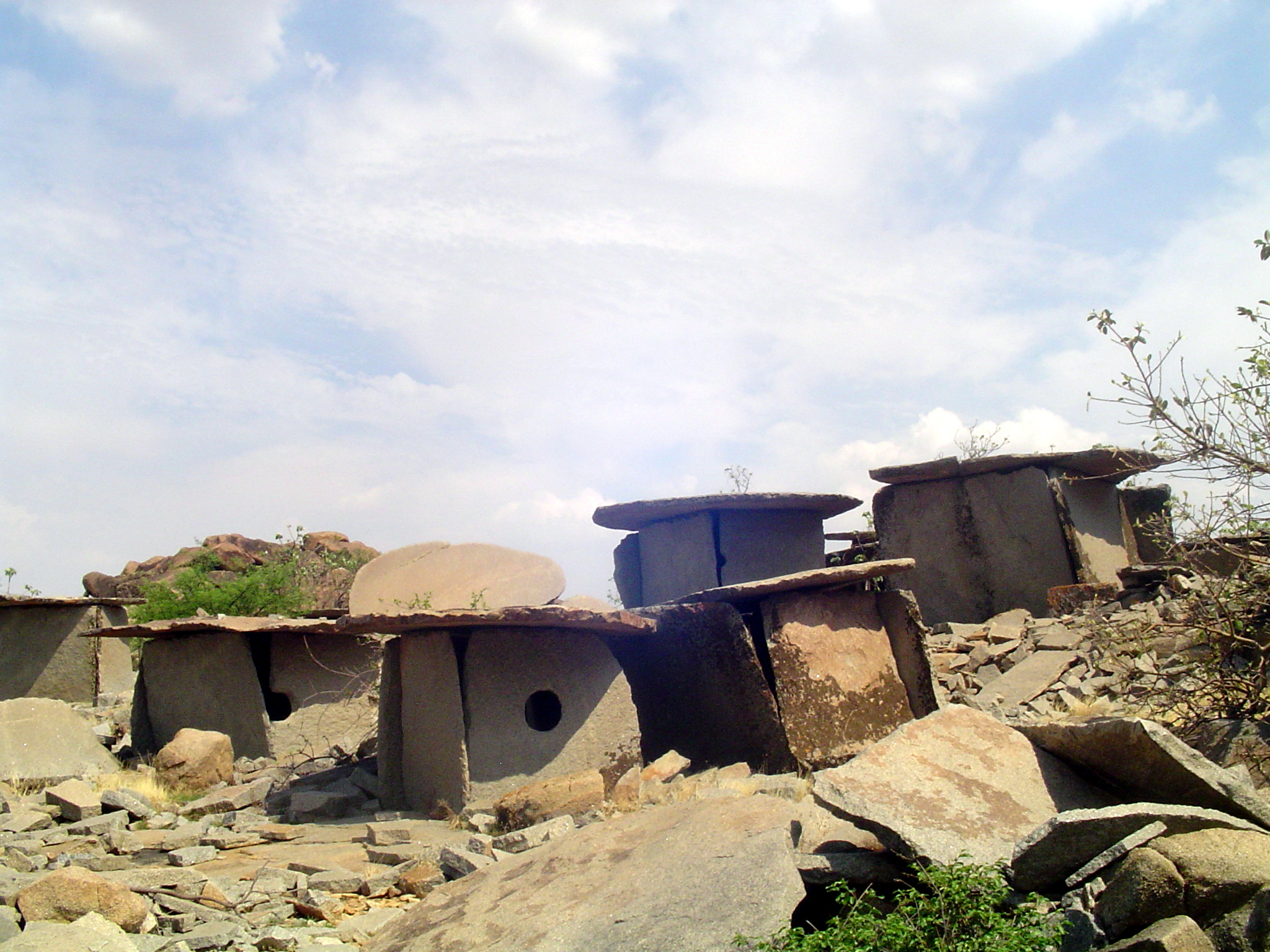
- Pre-historic site at Hirebeṇakal

- Location in Karnataka, India
- Coordinates: 15°26′16.12″N 76°27′21.61″E
- Country: India
- State: Karnataka
- District: Koppal

Languages
  - Official: Kannada
- Time zone: UTC+5:30 (IST)
- Vehicle registration: KA-37
- Nearest city: Gangavati

Hirebenakal or Hirébeṇakal or Hirébeṇakallu (ಹಿರೇಬೆಣಕಲ್ಲು in Kannada) is a megalithic site in the state of Karnataka, India. It is among the few megalithic sites in India that can be dated to the 800 BCE to 200 BCE period. The site is located in the Koppal district, some 10 kilometres (6.2 mi) west of the town of Gangavati and some 35 kilometres (22 mi) from Hospet city. It contains roughly 400 megalithic funerary monuments, that have been dated to the transition period between Neolithic period and the Iron Age. Known locally (in the Kannada language) as eḷu guḍḍagaḷu (or 'the seven hills'), their specific name is moryar guḍḍa (or 'the hill of the moryas"). Hirebenakal is reported to be the largest necropolis among the 2000 odd megalithic sites found in South India, most of them in the state of Karnataka. Since 1955, it has been under the management of the Dharwad circle of the Archaeological Survey of India (ASI). On May 19, 2021, it was proposed that Hirebenakal be made a UNESCO World Heritage Site.

== Geography ==
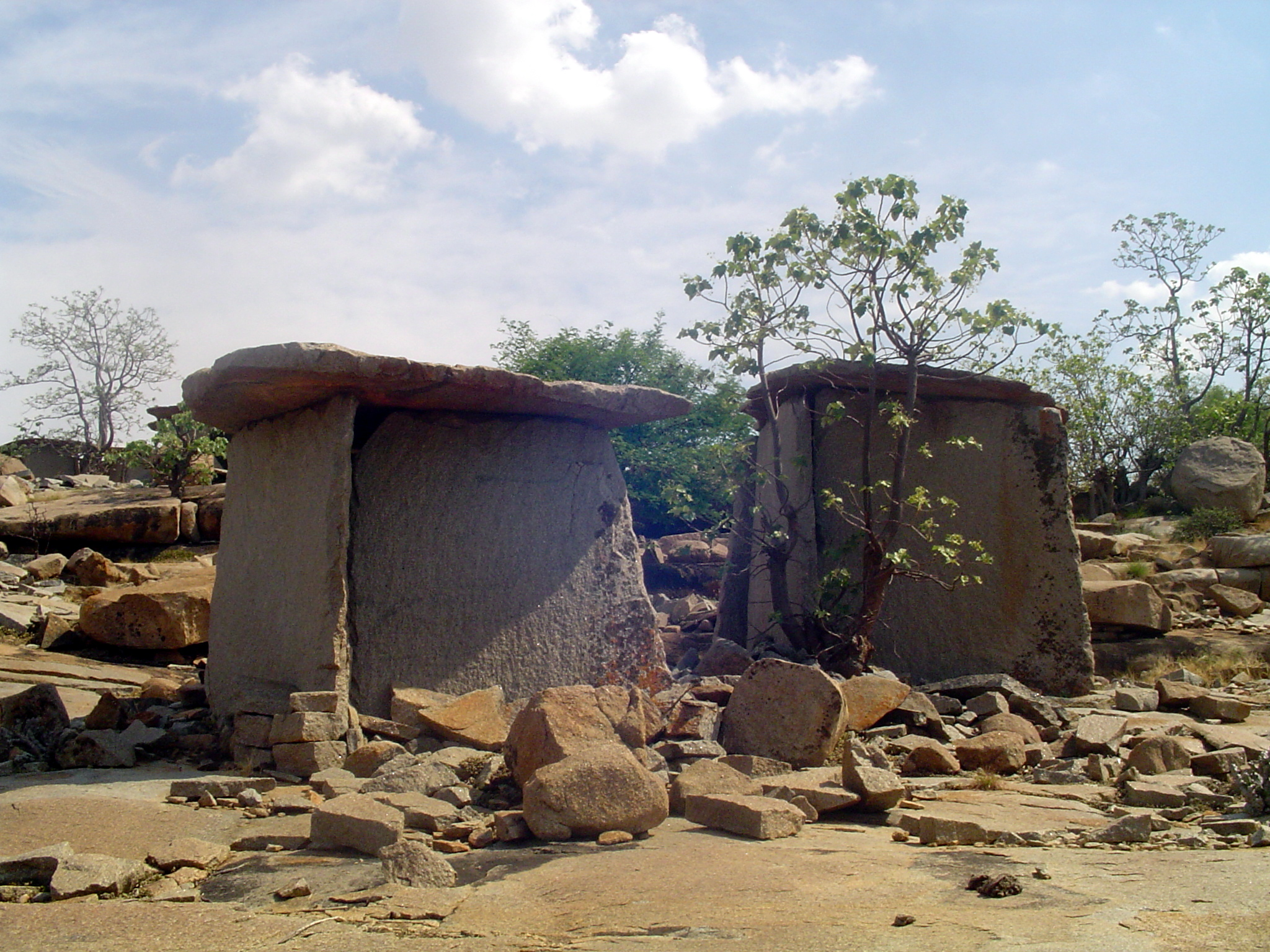
Prehistoric site

The funerary monuments are located on a rocky range of seven hills. The site lies to the left of the Tungabhadra River. Covered with thorny bushes and slippery scattered boulders, the climb to the site is relatively easy and well marked. A perennial source of water has been found in the form of a lake and an old quarry site discovered nearby has been postulated to be the source for the materials used to build the Hirebenakal monuments. Hirebenakal village can be reached, via the state highway, from the towns of Gangavathi, Hospet and Koppal. The nearest railway station to the site is Gangavathi.

== History ==
This site was built more than 2000 years ago, with many of its megalithic structures dated to between 800 BCE and 200 BCE. The Iron Age is estimated to have spanned more than 1000 years (from 1200 BCE to 200 CE) in this portion of India. The port-holed chamber in the western group of the Hirebenakal area has been compared to similar finds at Rajankolur.

The first published reports on Hirebenakal were those in the Journal of the Royal Asiatic Society in 1835, by Philip Meadows Taylor, who was under the service of the Nizam of Hyderabad. For over a century afterwards, no further systematic study of the site was conducted. Between 1944 and 1948, Sir Mortimer Wheeler undertook archaeological excavations; these were supplemented by Adiga Sundara and were published in 1975. In his publication, "The Early Chamber Tombs of South India: A Study of the Iron Age Megalithic Monuments of North Karnataka", Sundara's cataloguing describes details of 300 megalithic burial chambers at a site which was surrounded by thick forest. Andrew Bauer of the Department of Anthropology at Stanford University has carried out investigations in recent years and identified about 1000 different types of antiquaries within an area of about 20 hectares (49 acres). His findings describe anthropomorphic funerary structures, menhirs, and circle-shaped stone fences. Bauer states in his writings that the dolmens supported by stone slabs appear to have been erected perfectly, without any joining mortar.

== Description ==
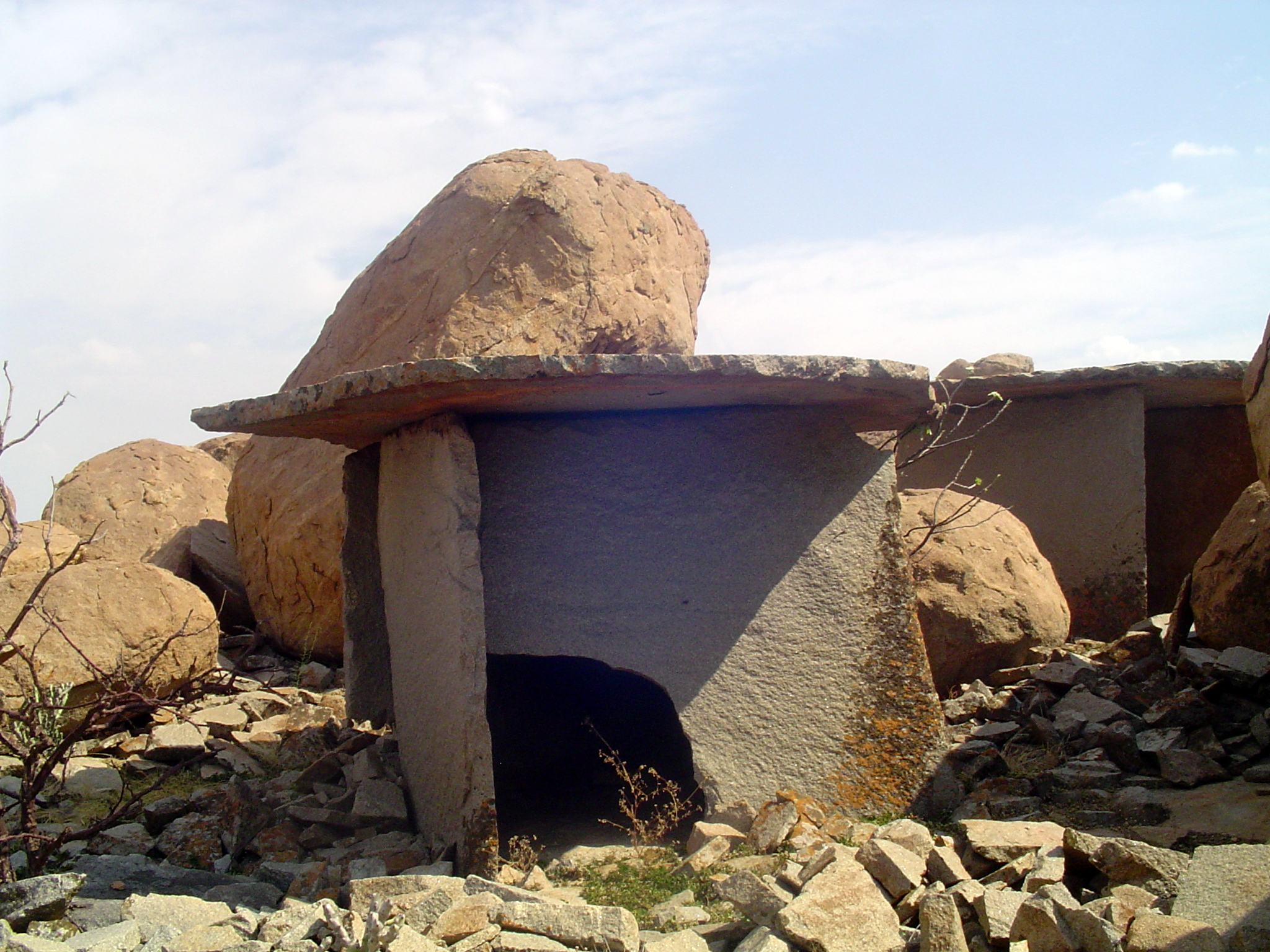
Boulder supported dolmen chambers

The setting for the approximately 400 megalithic monuments is like that of a ghost town. Their structures are varied in shape and size. There are clusters of dolmens, three-sided chambers with capstones forming the roof. The small dolmens are 50–100 centimetres (20–39 in) while the larger ones measure up to 3 metres (9.8 ft) height. The buried and semi-buried dolmens are categorized as cists and dolmenoid cists, and are arranged in circular layouts. Most of them have now collapsed. The dolmens with round portholes give the appearance of dwellings with windows, but they are, in fact, funerary structures. These dolmens flank both sides of what was once the main street. Pit circles and oblong chambers covered with gable stone-roofs have also been found. The dolmenoid cists exist in several shapes and sizes. Those of an oblong shape have been understood to have been built by packing rubble stones at ground level. A circular enclosure has been noted. Around these structures is a pit filled with layers of earth. Inside the rock shelters, there are paintings of people dancing, hunting, and holding weapons. There are also geometric and mystical designs of deer, peacocks, antelopes, humped bulls, horses, and cows. An unusual find is a stone kettledrum on a 10 metres (33 ft) high boulder. The boulder is hemispherical in shape, with a diameter of 2 metres (6 ft 7 in) and a height of 1.5 metres (4 ft 11 in). When struck with a wooden hammer, the boulder has been known to produce sounds that can be heard up to 1 kilometre (0.62 mi) away. The caves in this area were either residences or places of worship and contained cave paintings made using a red ochre colour, a fact corroborated by the nearby funerary structures.

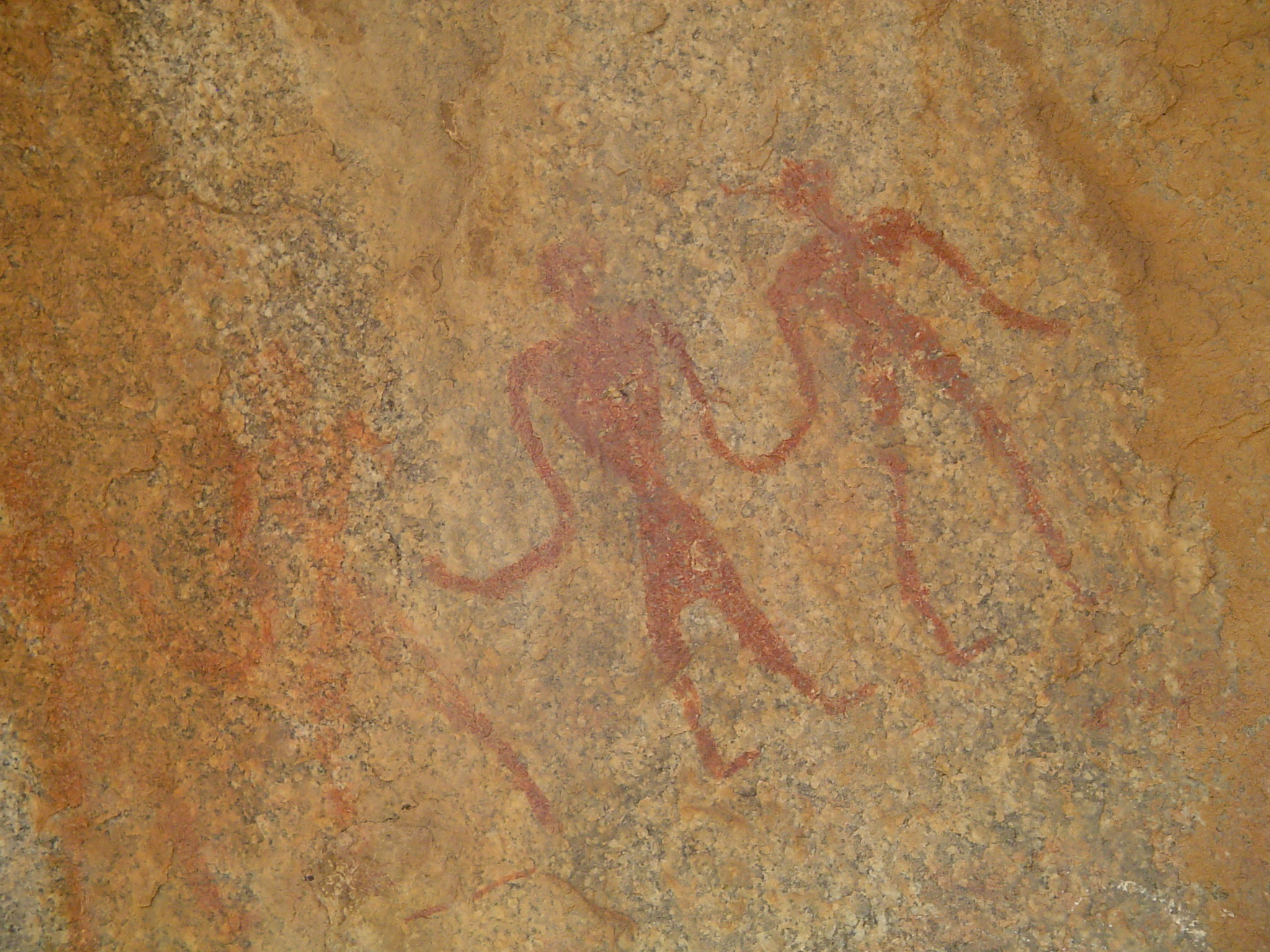
Cave painting

== Artifacts ==
Pottery from the Neolithic period has been found at the site. Pre-megalithic implements, iron slag, and pottery from the Neolithic, megalithic and early historic periods have been identified. Iron implements, a common megalithic period find in South India, is also found at the Hirebenakal site.

== Preservation ==
Although the renovation and maintenance of the site is the responsibility of the Archaeological Survey of India (ASI), hardly any activity is evident. Unfamiliar to most Indians and to most foreigners, it is estimated that only a dozen foreign tourists visit the site annually. A crucial part of the site's maintenance is improving the signage at the base of the hill and near the Raichur-Koppal State Highway. As it is, the dolmens have been ransacked over the centuries by thieves in search of hidden treasure. Shepherds too continue to graze their livestock at the site, resulting in the frequent collapse of the dolmens.

== Culture ==
The locals of the village nearest Hirebenakal believe that god himself walks from hill to hill during their annual festival. This belief precludes them from grazing their cattle there.

== Other megalithic sites in Karnataka ==
- Brahmagiri archaeological site
- Kupgal petroglyphs
- Sidlaphadi
- Khyad
- Neolithic
- Sonda
- Byse
- Anegundi
- Morera Thatte
- Sanganakallu
- South Asian Stone Age

== See also ==
- Archaeology in India
- Timeline of Indian history
- List of Indus Valley Civilisation sites
- List of archaeological sites by country § India
- World Heritage Sites by country § India
