= Khyad =

Khyad Khyad area of Badami
- Location in Karnataka, India
- Coordinates: 15°55′12″N 75°40′49″E
- Country: India
- State: Karnataka
- District: Bagalkot

Languages
  - Official: Kannada
- Time zone: UTC+5:30 (IST)
- PIN: 587 201
- Telephone code: 08357

Khyad is a hamlet located in the Badami taluk of Bagalkot district in North Karnataka, known for its ancient structures and the discovery of numerous fossils from the Stone Age.

In 1873, Robert Bruce, a scholar, identified this area. Researchers, scholars, and students from Deccan College in Pune, along with experts in ancient history, have conducted extensive studies here, uncovering significant information about the region's ancient past. In collaboration with the Archaeological Survey of India (ASI) - Mysore division, students from Delhi discovered several stone tools during excavations.

The district administration is committed to preserving this significant heritage site.

== See also ==
- Sidlaphadi
- Hirebenkal
- Sanganakallu
- Anegundi
- Kupgal petroglyphs
- Prehistoric rock art
- South Asian Stone Age
- Sonda
- Byse
