= Sanganakallu =

Ancient quarry and settlement in Karnataka

- ಸಂಗನಕಲ್ಲು (Kannada)
- Location in Karnataka, India
- 15°11′5″N 76°58′13″E
- Type: Settlement
- Periods: Mesolithic • Neolithic
- Location: Karnataka, India

History
- Built: c. 3000 BC

Sanganakallu (Kannada: ಸಂಗನಕಲ್ಲು) is an ancient archaeological site from the Neolithic period (circa 3000 BC). It is approximately 7 km from Bellary in eastern Karnataka. It is a group of hills south of a horseshoe shaped valley, with Kupgal to the north. It is one of the earliest settlements in South India, spread over 1,000 acres. There is a layer of red-brown fossilized soil spread over Sanganakallu and Kupgal that can be dated back to 9000 BC. The site is considered to be a Neolithic factory site due to the surface excavation revealing large numbers of pottery, stone axes, and other stone tools. The site was first majorly excavated in 1946, by Bendapudi Subbarao, on Sannarasamma hill. Subbarao divided their culture into 3 phases:

- Pre-Mesolithic, the phase when Sanganakallu was first settled, had little pottery, and the people made crude microliths.
- Mesolithic, the phase when pottery was handmade and stone axes were mass produced.
- Neolithic, the phase when pottery and tools became more sophisticated.

Sanganakallu was excavated again in 1964.

== Tools ==
The earliest tools excavated were hundreds of patinated flakes made of basalt, and quartz flakes. In the later Mesolithic phase is when tool making became more abundant. Stone axes, hammer stones, chisels, picks, slick-stones, and sling stones were excavated. The axes were found in many different shapes. There were oval shaped, triangular shaped, or rectangular shaped axes and some were axes were rounded and some were thin. The sheer number of microliths is the reason Sanganakallu is considered a factory site.

== Pottery ==
The first pottery started showing up in Mesolithic phase. The pottery was usually dull brown or black, and hand-made out of coarse clay. Pale-gray pots made of fine clay mixed with lime and mica were also excavated. The pottery from the later Neolithic period were more fine, thin, and polished. They were all burnt and wheel turned. The ornamental pottery was decorated in a finger groove pattern and a few shards were found painted purple. A few pots were perforated and the significance of that is not yet known.

== 1964 excavation ==
In this excavation, a one room Neolithic circular house was excavated. The wall was made with bamboo and clay and the floor was covered in potholes. There was a hearth in the center of the house, and there is evidence of it being burned. Other than the house structure, a few terracotta figurines in the shape of birds or bulls were also found as well as more stone tools and pottery. Animal remains were also collected, the majority of which were cow bones.

== Early agriculturists ==
The people who settled at Sanganakallu were early agriculturists, who cultivated small millets and pulses. They kept sheep, cattle, and had separate areas for dumping dung (ash mounds). It is hypothesized these ash mounds were for burning cow dung possibly in a ritual manner.

== See also ==
- Brahmagiri archaeological site
- Kupgal petroglyphs
- Hirebenkal
- Sidlaphadi
- Khyad
- Neolithic
- South Asian Stone Age
- Kupgal petroglyphs
- Sonda
- Byse
- Anegundi

== See also ==
- Archaeology in India
- Timeline of Indian history
- List of Indus Valley Civilisation sites
- List of archaeological sites by country § India
- World Heritage Sites by country § India
