= Robert Bruce Foote Sanganakallu Archaeological Museum =

Coordinates: 15°08′45″N 76°56′18″E

- Established: February 2020
- Location: Ballari, Karnataka
- Type: Archaeological Museum
- Collections: Paleolithic, Neolithic and Iron Age artifacts
- Collection size: 50,000
- Founder: Ravi Korisettar
- Director: Ravi Korisettar

Robert Bruce Foote Sanganakallu Archaeological Museum is a prehistoric museum located in Ballari city, Ballari district, Karnataka, India. It was inaugurated on 26 February 2020. It is the only museum in India focused exclusively on the Stone Age. The museum is named after Robert Bruce Foote, a British geologist and Archaeologist. It houses 50,000 artefacts. The museum was established to protect the Sanganakallu Neolithic site from granite quarrying and was conceived by archaeologist Ravi Korisettar.

== Location ==
The museum is situated in Ballari city, ath the cultural complex.

== History ==
=== Sanganakallu archaeological site ===
The Sanganakallu site was first documented in 1870. British civil engineer William Fraser informed Robert Bruce Foote of rock drawings in the area and Foote identified the area as a Neolithic stone axe manufacturing workshop. B Subbarao conducted the first systematic excavation at Sanganakallu in 1940. The site is one of the largest Neolithic to Iron Age settlements in South India, dating from approximately 3,000 BCE to around 100 CE. Archaeological evidence indicates a complex society engaged in stone tool manufacturing, agriculture, cattle rearing and trade.

=== Museum proposal and founding ===
In 2004, Korisettar started a movement to the protect the site from granite quarrying and proposed a museum. In 2008, he appealed to the Deputy Commissioner of Ballari, who approved the proposal. Work was delayed for technical reasons, but in June 2015 the museum was expected to open within two months. The museum inaugurated on 26 February 2020. The storey museum covers approximately 7,000 square feet (0.16 acres). Construction cost over ₹55 lakh (US$57,000), with funding from Corporate social responsibility initiatives of Jindal Steel Works, NMDC and Minera Steel as well as local contributions. Public outreach was delayed by the COVID-19 pandemic.

=== Later developments ===
In the 2021-22 state budget ₹5 crore (US$520,000) released. The museum received CCTV cameras and wireless internet through a partnership with Karnataka Tourism Infrastructure Limited.

=== Architecture and facilities ===
The museum is a two storey structure covering approximately 7,000 square feet (0.16 acres) square feet. It was upgraded with CCTV cameras and wireless internet in 2022.

=== Collections and exhibits ===
The museum houses approximately 50,000 artefacts from the Paleolithic, Neolithic and iron age periods. These include stone tools, pottery, beads, iron implements, terracotta object objects and human & animal remains. The collection include late pleistocene symbolic beads from Jwalapuram in Andhra Pradesh and terracotta bulls believed to be votive objects.

=== Ground floor ===
The ground floor contains sections on the African roots of humankind, Indian prehistory, the prehistory of Kalyana-Karnataka and geological resources of the Rayalaseema region. A scaled-down model of the Sanganakallu hills is displayed with LED lights.

=== First floor ===
The first floor named after B. Subbarao and displays artefacts from 2200 - 700 BCE. A reconstructed Sarcophagus burial urn from the Kudatini ash mound is on display. The urn contained the remains of a seven year old child, suggesting the emergence of social elites in the Early iron age.

== Impact ==
The Museum's establishment helped halt large-scale granite quarrying at the Sanganakallu Neolithic site, and it preserves Neolithic stone artefacts for research scholars. By 2024, the museum was serving as a research institute. Over half dozen PhD researchers from international universities used its collections for doctoral work. Sutonuka Bhattacharya, PhD student at the Hebrew University of Jerusalem, visited the museum to study griding stone collections.

== Funding ==
Initial development cost over ₹55 lakh (US$57,000) supported by corporate social responsibility from Jindal Steel Works, NMDC and Minera Steel. The 2021-22 state budget allocated ₹5 crore (US$520,000), with ₹2 crore (US$210,000) released.

== See also ==
- Neolithic India
