= Thomas Newbold =

Thomas Newbold may refer to:

- Thomas Newbold (New Jersey politician) (1760–1823), U.S. Representative from New Jersey
- Thomas Newbold (New York politician) (1849–1929), American lawyer, politician, and society leader during the Gilded Age
- Thomas John Newbold (1807–1850), English soldier, traveller and orientalist
