= Sundem =

Kingdom of Sundem Sonda Raja
- 1555–1935
- Status: Vassal to Vijayanagara Empire, Maratha Empire and the Bijapur Sultanate at several times
- Government: Monarchy
- King of Sundem (Rei de Sundem)
  - 1555 - 1598: Arasappa Rajendra Wodiyar
  - ? - 1935 (last): Basavalinga II Rajendra Udaiyar
- History
  - Established: 1555
  - Disestablished: 1935
Succeeded by
Portuguese India
- Today part of: India

Sundem (Soundekar Dynasty), also called the 'Nayakas of Sonda', 'Sonda Raja' or 'Soundekar Raja' was a dynasty that initially ruled from Sonda in the hilly terrain of Uttara Kannada, and then moved to Goa in the 18th century.

== History ==
Nayakas of Sonda were feudatory vassals at various times to the Vijayanagara Empire, Maratha Empire and the Bijapur Sultanate. Finally they became vassals of the Portuguese Empire.

In 1763, the Sonda state was attacked by Hyder Ali, forcing the reigning chieftain to seek asylum from the Portuguese Empire in Goa. The family was initially sheltered in Gouli-Moula, Tiswadi. On January 17, 1791, a formal treaty was signed between the Soundekar Raja and the Portuguese government. As a gesture of gratitude for their protection, the Raja bequeathed the territories of Ponda, Zambaulim, Canacona, and the Panchmahal to the Portuguese. This transfer of land significantly expanded the Novas Conquistas (New Conquests) of Goa. In return, the Raja was permitted to retain a three-acre estate in Bandora, Ponda, which remains the family's seat today. They were called the 'Rei de Sundem' in Portuguese.

== Religious & Cultural Patrons ==
The Nayakas of Sonda (also known as the Nayakas of Swadi) were significant patrons of the Dvaita and Jain traditions in the Malenadu and coastal regions of Karnataka from 1555 to 1763. Their patronage was characterized by a unique religious pluralism, where they supported multiple faiths to consolidate their regional authority.

=== The Sodhe Matha ===
One of the most enduring legacies of the Sonda Nayakas is their support for the Sodhe Matha (one of the Ashta Mathas of Udupi). Arasappa Nayaka II was a devoted disciple of the saint Sri Vadiraja Tirtha, and it was under the Nayakas' patronage that the Matha was established as a major spiritual hub in Sonda.

== List of Rajas ==
1. Arasappa Rajendra Wodiyar (r. 1555-1598)
2. Ramachandra Rajendra Wodiyar (r. 1598-1618)
3. Raghunatha Rajendra Wodiyar (r. 1618-1638)
4. Madhulinga Rajendra Wodiyar (r. 1638-1674)
5. Sadashiva Rajendra Wodiyar (r. 1674-1697)
6. Basavalinga Rajendra Wodiyar (r. 1697-1745)
7. Immadi Sadashiva Rajendra Wodiyar (r. 1745-1763)
8. Sawai Basavalinga I Rajendra Udaiyar 1763 - 1843
9. Sadashiva II Rajendra Udaiyar 1843
10. Vira Rajendra Udaiyar 1843 - 1893
11. Sawai Basavalinga II Rajendra Udaiyar 1893 - 1895
12. Sawai Vira Sadashiva Rajendra Udaiyar 1895 - 1933
13. Basavalinga II Rajendra Udaiyar 1933 - 1935
14. Basavalinga II Rajendra Udaiyar 1936 - present
