= Thomas John Newbold =

Thomas John Newbold (8 February 1807 – 29 May 1850) was an English soldier in the service of the East India Company, known as a traveller and orientalist.

== Life ==
The son of Francis Newbold, a surgeon of Macclesfield, he was born there on 8 February 1807. He obtained a commission as ensign in the 23rd regiment Madras light infantry under the East India Company in 1828. Arriving in India in that year, he passed an examination in Hindustani in 1830, and in Persian in 1831.

From 1830 to 1835 Newbold was quartermaster and interpreter to his regiment. Moved to Malacca in 1832, he became lieutenant in 1834. While in command of the port at Lingy, he detained a boat supplying a belligerent, in a conflict in relation to which government of Malacca desired to maintain a strict neutrality. On his prosecution by the owner, the legality of the seizure could not be maintained; but Newbold's conduct was approved by the court, and he was reimbursed his expenses. Arriving at the presidency with a detachment of his corps in August 1835, he was approved aide-de-camp to Brigadier-general E. W. Wilson, C.B., commanding the ceded districts, an appointment which he held until 1840. He was appointed deputy assistant quartermaster-general for the division in 1838, and deputy assistant adjutant-general and postmaster to the field force in the ceded districts in 1839.

Newbold left India on leave of absence early in 1840, and visited Jebel Nákas ("Bell Mountain"), a tourist attraction in the Sinai Peninsula in June of that year. He was elected a member of the Asiatic Society on 5 June 1841, and during a residence of some months in England read several papers before the society.

Newbold was elected a Fellow of the Royal Society on 6 January 1842. He was promoted to the rank of captain on 12 April, and was recalled to India in May. Arriving at Madras, he was appointed assistant to the commission at Kurnool, and also to command the horse. He was assistant to the agent to the governor of Fort St. George at Kurnool and Bunganahilly from 1843 to 1848, when he was appointed assistant to the resident at Hyderabad. He was permitted to go to Egypt for two years in June 1845. He died at Mahabuleshwar on 29 May 1850.

== Works ==
In the Royal Society's catalogue forty-six scientific papers are mentioned of which Newbold was the author. During his residence of three years in the Straits of Malacca, where he had constant contact with the Malayan peninsula, he accumulated material for papers contributed to the journals of the Asiatic societies of Bengal and Madras. These papers formed the basis of his Political and Statistical Account of the British Settlements in the Straits of Malacca … with a History of the Malayan States on the Peninsula of Malacca, London, 2 vols. 1839.

Newbold also investigated the mineral resources of India, and was an authority on the geology of Southern India, which he investigated with great thoroughness. He was among the first to describe Neolithic ashmounds from peninsular India. The results of his observations were published from time to time in scientific periodicals. He was also an oriental scholar, and studied Eastern poetry.

== Notes ==
Attribution

This article incorporates text from a publication now in the public domain: Lee, Sidney, ed. (1894). "Newbold, Thomas John". Dictionary of National Biography. Vol. 40. London: Smith, Elder & Co.
