= Neolithic ashmounds =

Prehistoric man made ash deposits in south India

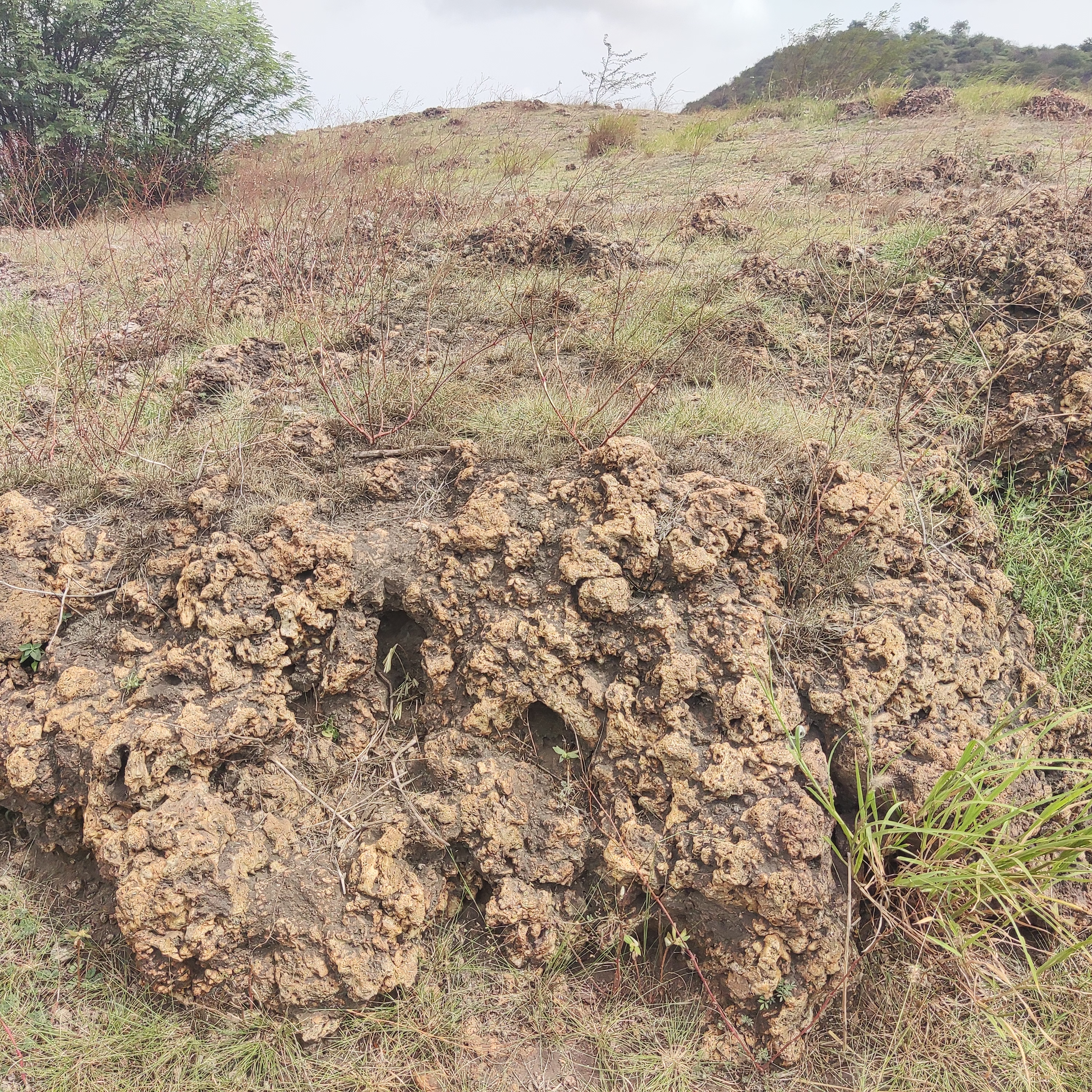
Budikanama ashmounds near Kudathini

Neolithic ashmounds (also referred to as cinder mounds) are among the earliest known evidence of human occupation in the Indian subcontinent. Found primarily on the Deccan Plateau of southern India, these man-made accumulations of fossilised ash have been dated to the Neolithic period, approximately 3200 to 1200 BC.

The origins and function of the mounds remained a subject of scholarly debate for many years, prompting numerous hypotheses and scientific investigations. They were traditionally interpreted as the incidental by-products of early pastoralist activity. However, contemporary research recognises them as multi-functional sites that likely served purposes including ritual performance. Current evidence suggests they were created by early agro-pastoral communities through the repeated burning of wood, dung, and animal matter.

== Formation ==
Ashmounds are thick deposits of vitrified ash and burnt organic material formed through the repeated burning of accumulated cattle dung. Long-term accumulation and periodic burning events cause these deposits to develop into large mounds over time. They typically exhibit alternating layers of ash and sediment, and commonly contain ceramic fragments, stone tools, and animal bones.

Microscopic and chemical analysis indicates that the ash resulted from high-temperature combustion, as evidenced by the fusion of silica within plant cells, known as phytoliths which were present in the cattle dung. The inorganic ash, in combination with water, acted as a cementitious medium, preserving structural impressions within the deposits, including cattle hoof prints. Analysis of the phytoliths recovered from ashmounds indicates a grass origin, confirming that the associated cattle grazed on the local grasslands of the Deccan Plateau.

== Geographical distribution ==
The distribution of ashmounds closely follows the stable geological formations and semi-arid climate of the Deccan Plateau, conditions favoured by Neolithic peoples for their open grasslands and availability of stone suitable for tool production. The majority of identified sites are concentrated in the modern states of Karnataka, Andhra Pradesh, and Telangana, corresponding broadly to the river valleys of the Tungabhadra, Krishna, and Hagari.

=== Major excavated sites ===
Over 200 sites were recorded by Robert Foote. Below of the list of sites which are studied extensively.

1. Utnur (Telangana)
2. Budihal (Kalaburagi, Karnataka)
3. Budigunta (Karnataka)
4. Kupgal and Hiregudda (Bellary, Karnataka)
5. Sanganakallu (Bellary, Karnataka)
6. Pallovay (Andra Pradesh)
7. Kodekal (Karnataka)
8. Kuntini (Karnataka)
9. Toranagallu (Karnataka)
10. Sannarachamma (Karnataka)
11. Valasai (Tamil Nadu)
12. Piklihal(Karnataka)
13. Maski (Karnataka)
14. Watgal (Karnataka)
15. Terdal (Karnataka)
16. Tekkalakota (Karnataka)
17. Hallur (Karnataka)
18. Hattibelagallu & Velpumadugu (Andhra Pradesh)
19. Tadbidi (Karnataka)
20. Valasai (Tamil Nadu)

== Archaeological history ==
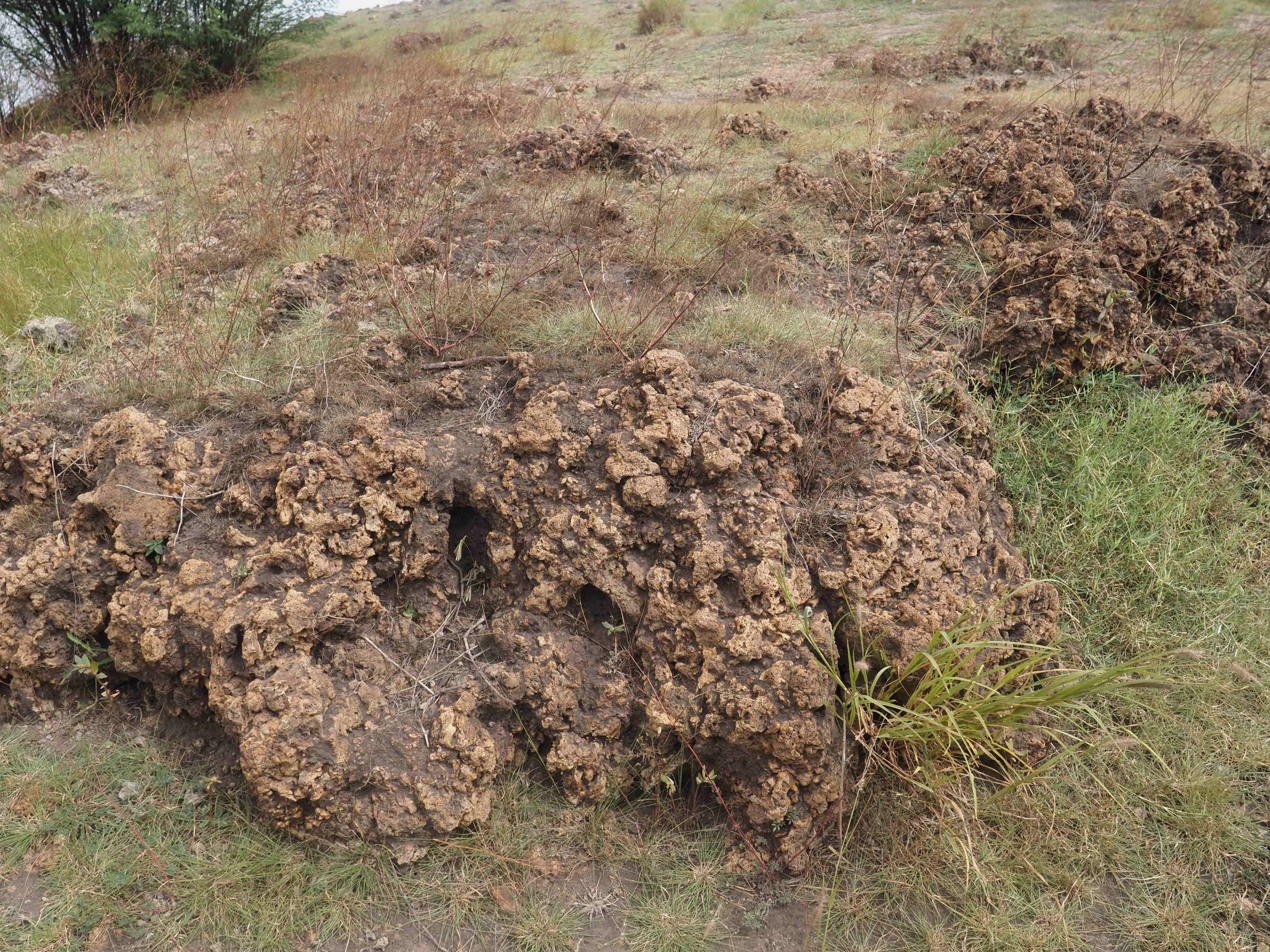
Close up of material at the Budikanama site

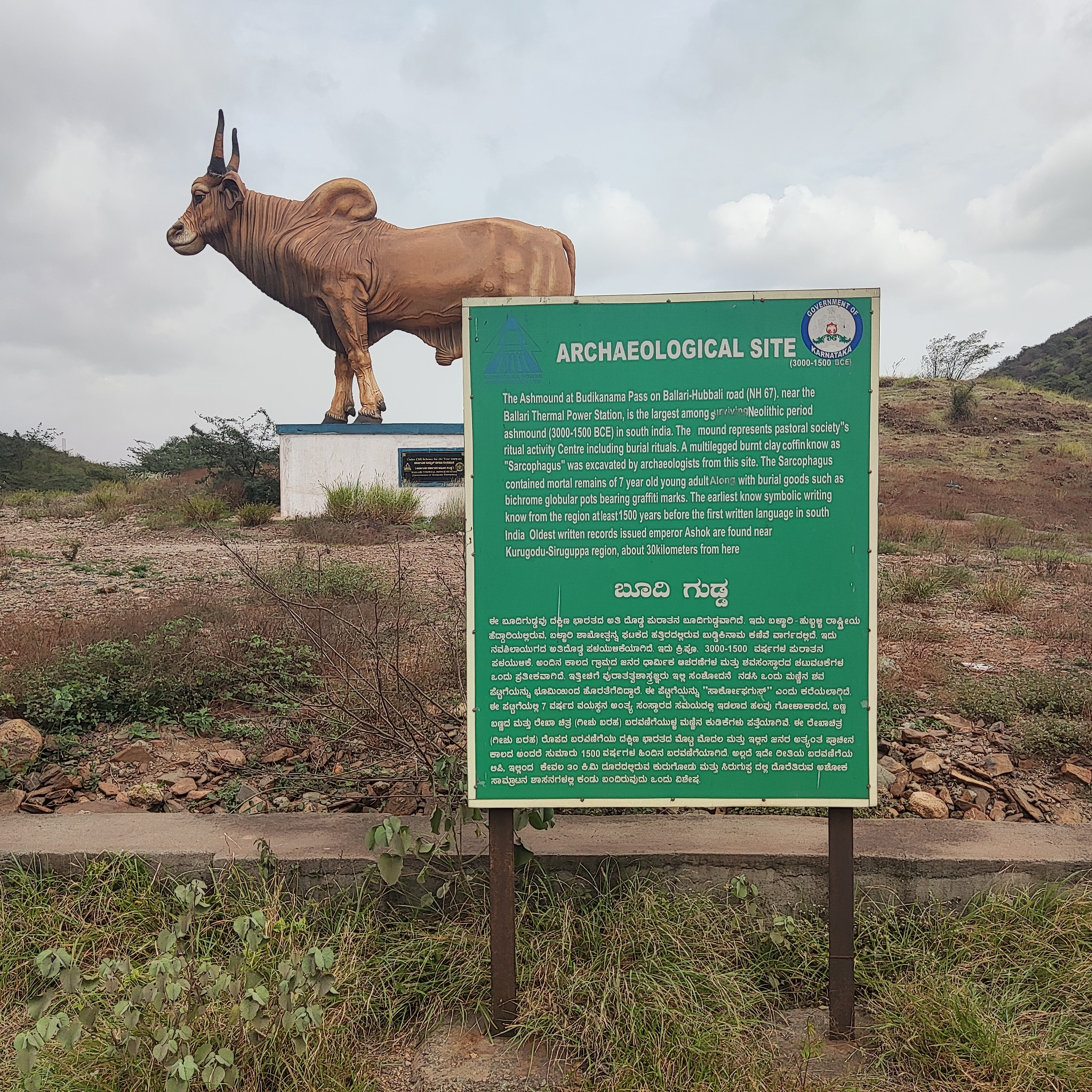
The Budikanama site was almost destroyed for a highway in 2018

Ashmounds were traditionally interpreted through mythological frameworks, being regarded as the burnt remains of rakshasas such as Vali, Bakasura, or Hidimba.

The earliest scholarly accounts of ashmounds were made by Colonel Colin Mackenzie and Thomas J. Newbold in 1836. Newbold disputed his colleague Prinsep's view that the ash deposits were the product of ancient volcanic activity. Through his study of the ashmounds at Kugpal and Budigunta, Newbold instead proposed that the mounds were the result of human activity. Further investigations were carried out by Taylor in 1851 and 1853 during his documentation of the megaliths of the Shorapur region, in which he attributed both the ashmounds and associated stone alignments to the Iron Age.

Cavelly Venkata Lachmia, a colleague of Colin Mackenzie and president of the Madras Hindu Literary Society, recorded comparable sites across Mysore state, including Budihal and Buditippa, noting that the prefix būdi carries the meaning of "ash" in the local language.

In 1899, Robert Sewell proposed that the region had once been densely forested and considered several possible explanations for the mounds, including the presence of furnaces. He ultimately suggested that they may have been the remains of large pyres used to dispose of soldiers and animals killed in medieval battles.

By the early twentieth century, extensive fieldwork by Robert Bruce Foote had recorded more than 200 sites. Foote pushed the origins of the ashmounds back to the Neolithic period, drawing connections between dolerite tools, associated ceramics, and cattle dung as the primary source material. Later work by Rami Reddy at Palavoy identified iron objects and Iron Age ceramics in the upper layers of deposits, suggesting that while the ashmounds were initiated during the Neolithic, their use continued into the Iron Age.

In the mid-twentieth century, Frank Raymond Allchin provided the first detailed stratigraphic and radiocarbon chronology for ashmound formations. He identified regular linear postholes along the mounds and argued that they represented seasonal cattle camps in which pens were constructed using fence posts.

In the early 1990s, K. Paddayya challenged the prevailing interpretation of ashmounds as isolated cattle enclosures, demonstrating instead that many represented permanent, year-round pastoral settlements. He documented habitation debris including pottery, stone tools, and animal bones which were surrounding the mounds, and proposed that the mounds themselves functioned as communal disposal areas for dung and refuse cleared from living quarters, which were then periodically and ceremonially burned for hygiene and pest management.

Archaeobotanical analysis of plant remains from ashmound sites has indicated that millet cultivation may have been of considerable importance. Two species not commonly cultivated today, Brachiaria ramosa and Setaria verticillata, have been recovered from several sites, while the most frequently identified legumes are Vigna radiata and Macrotyloma uniflorum. Faunal assemblages are dominated by cattle, buffalo, and pig, though whether the latter were wild or domesticated remains difficult to determine.

In 2024, a few Neolithic ashmounds in Ballari were destroyed in the process of development projects due to historical ignorance.
