= Kupgal petroglyphs =

- Location within India
- 15°10′53″N 76°58′07″E
- Periods: Neolithic
- Location: Kupgal, Karnataka, India
- Region: Southern Deccan Plateau

The Kupgal petroglyphs are works of rock art found at Kupgal in Bellary district of Karnataka, India. Thousands of petroglyphs have been found at Kupgal, which date to the Neolithic or even the old Stone Age. The site, which includes examples of rock gongs, was discovered first in 1892, but subsequently became lost to researchers until it was rediscovered in the early 21st century. This site features peculiar rock formations with unusual depressions which make musical sounds when struck with boulders.

== The site ==
The site is situated in the Bellary district of mid-eastern Karnataka, approximately 5 km north-east of the town of Bellary. Archaeological sites in this area appear in the literature under different names, but the names of Sanganakallu and Kupgal, two local villages, occur commonly. Here, Neolithic remains are found concentrated on the tops and slopes of an outcrop of granitic hills while remains of the Megalithic (Iron Age) and Early historic, and subsequent periods are found predominantly in surrounding peneplain.

Of the many sites here, the largest is located on the biggest and northernmost of the granitic hills. It was called Peacock Hill by the British during the colonial period and was sometimes referred to as such in early literature. Locals, generally call the hill Hiregudda, which simply means 'Big Hill' in the local Kannada language. Most archaeological literature, however, refers to the hill as Kupgal hill, after a neighbouring village (though the nearest village is Sirivaram). Recent archaeological research has dated the main period of Neolithic occupation on this hill top between 4000 and 3300 years ago

Kupgal hill is a fairly large granitic hill with several peaks, with a large dolerite trap dyke running along its axis. Petroglyphs belonging to different periods, from the neolithic to the modern day, can be found bruised or engraved on the black rocks all along the dyke. A heavy concentration of rock art is seen where the dyke emerges across the upper northern peak of the hill.

=== Rediscovery ===
The site was first reported in the Asiatic Quarterly Review in 1892 (Fawcett). The report included a brief summary by Fawcett along with hand sketches by Sewell. It is also mentioned by Foote in his 1916 volume on the Prehistoric and Protohistoric Antiquities of India. But subsequent explorers who tried to trace it were unable to do so. Brief descriptions of the site by Subbarao (Subbarao, 1947), Gordon (1951) and Padayya (1973) appeared, but the site itself remained lost. A few pictures of the site had also been taken in the 19th century, but the originals were either lost, or allowed to fade. Photographs apparently taken by Fawcett had been sent to the Madras Museum and the Royal Anthropological Institute. While the ones in the Madras Museum were lost or allowed to fade, those in the R.A.I. were re-photographed before they faded. These were later published by Gordon (1951). In 2002, Dr. Boivin in association with Ravi Korisettar of the Karnataka University carried out a study of the site and published photographs which effectively make it only the second time that photographs of the Kupgal petroglyphs have been published.

== The south Indian Neolithic ==
Although later in date than the proto-Harappan neolithic of the early third to first millennium BC, the south Indian neolithic (which actually overlaps with the Mature phase of the Harappan Civilisation), is of special interest to researchers. This is because, unlike the neolithic of Baluchistan and eastern Afghanistan (which share similarities with the neolithic of neighbouring South-west Asia), the south Indian neolithic features a distinctively Indian crop package, a distinctively Indian emphasis on cattle pastoralism and a distinctively Indian form of ritual involving the burning of large quantities of cowdung. This latter ritual in particular, is a unique feature of the south Indian neolithic and has resulted in the formation of large ‘ashmounds’ up to 30 feet high at various places.

Despite the wealth of the south Indian neolithic, it has received disproportionately less attention from South Asian archaeologists. The situation has improved somewhat in recent years though, with the launch of a number of new excavation and survey projects aimed at a systematic study of various aspects of this archeological entity.

== Dating south Indian rock art ==
Dating south Indian neolithic art has traditionally been acknowledged as being problematic. Nonetheless, a rough chronological sequence for the rock art has been made possible by integrating various strands of evidence, by considering artistic style and method, the content of the rock art itself, its proximity to archaeological sites of known periods etc. These studies suggest that Neolithic rock art can be distinguished from rock art of other periods based on its distinctive style, subjects, method of production and weathering characteristics, and the repeated association of these features with archaeological sites of the neolithic period.

== The petroglyphs ==
Many of the motifs on the rocks are of cattle, in particular the long-horned humped-back type found in southern India (Bos indicus). Some are of human-like figures, either on their own or accompanied by cattle. Some of these are in chains or with bows and arrows. According to Dr Boivin, the masculine nature of the engravings suggest that the people who made the images were men and were probably involved in herding cattle. The motifs were made by bruising the rocks, presumably with a stone implement. Some of the images are in locations so difficult to reach that it would have required the artists to suspend themselves from an overhang to make the images.

=== Musical rocks ===
The locals refer to some of the rock formations as the 'musical' rocks. They consist of peculiar depressions in the rocks, which when struck with boulders produce loud, gong-like musical tones. In some cultures, percussion plays an important role in rituals and it is thought that these may have been part of rituals of the people of the region.

== Threatened ==
Commercial quarrying in the area now poses a serious threat to the motifs. Some sections of the hill have already been destroyed by the quarrying for granite. A rock shelter to the north of the Kupgal hill with an even older rock art has been partially destroyed. Dr Nicole Boivin, of the University of Cambridge, an expert who has researched the site has expressed fears that without government interest and intervention, the rock art may be completely destroyed.

== See also ==
- Bhimbetka rock shelters
- Petroglyphs
- Rock gong
