= Sonda, Karnataka =

Sode
- village
- Location in Karnataka, India
- Coordinates: 14°43′35″N 74°47′57″E
- Country: India
- State: Karnataka
- District: Uttara Kannada

Government
  - Type: Panchayat raj
  - Body: Gram panchayat

Languages
  - Official: Kannada
  - Regional: Sirsi Kannada
- Time zone: UTC+5:30 (IST)
- ISO 3166 code: IN-KA
- Vehicle registration: KA 31 Sirsi
- Nearest city: Sirsi

Sonda (also called Sode or Sodhe) is a village near Sirsi in the Uttara Kannada district of Karnataka in India.

== Location ==
Sodhe is a village in the Malenadu region, surrounded by thick forests. It is 22 km from Sirsi and 13 km from Hulekal.

== Prehistoric rock art ==
Prehistoric Rock art has been found near Sodhe. It comprises engravings and drawings dated to c. the first millennium BCE. In them, double sided squares with intersecting loops are engraved/ drawn. Such drawings have also been found at Hire Benakal, Gavali, Karnataka. They have some resemblance to present day rangoli/ rangavalli.

== History ==
Sodhe or Sonda has a long, recorded history. Sonda kingdom was established in 1555 by Arasappa Nayaka, a Jain chieftain (1555–1598). Sonda was ruled by Sonda Nayakas for more than two hundred years (1555–1763). Arasappa Nayaka remained vassal of the Vijayanagara Empire till the fall of Vijayanagara to the Adil Shahis in 1565. He continued as the subordinate ruler of Adil Shah till his death in 1598. Arasappa Nayaka established Vadiraj Matha in Sonda which is still in existence. Shivaji, the Maratha Emperor conquered Sonda during 1674 and gave it back to Sonda ruler, Sadashiva Nayaka. Hyder Ali, the Sultan of Mysore attacked Sonda in 1763 and totally destroyed it. The last chief of Sonda, Immodi Sadashivaraya escaped to Portuguese Goa. The ruins of the fort which was protecting Sonda is covered with overgrowth of shrubs. According to Imperial Gazetteer of India, five carved pillars, approximately 3 feet high are the remains of the Sonda palace.

== Temples ==
=== Shri Swarnavalli Maha Samsthana ===
Shree Matha is situated amidst evergreen forests near Shalmala river in Sirsi Taluk of Uttara Kannada district. Its history can be traced back to the period of Adi Shankaracharya who professed Advaita philosophy and established Mathas to propagate it. It is a famous religious center and includes 16 seemas in the Upperghat and several places in the Lowerghat and many more disciples across India. Havyaka Brahmins, Ramakshatriyas, Sheeligas, Siddhis, Marathis, Goulis, Bhandaris and Kunbis and many more are the traditional disciples of this matha.

Sodhe or Sonda or Swadi flourished during the Vijayanagara Empire and is a considered to be a sacred place by both Hindus and Jains. Sonda is known for Shri Vadiraja Matha, Shri Swarnavalli Matha and is about 15 km (9.3 mi) from Sirsi.

=== Jain temples ===
There are Jain monasteries, like Swadhi Jain matha and Digambar Jain temples situated at Sodhe.

=== Sonda Mutt (Sodhe Vadiraja Matha) ===
The Sonda Mutt (also known as the Sodhe Vadiraja Matha) is a prominent Hindu monastery and one of the Ashta Mathas of Udupi established by Madhvacharya in the 13th century. While the lineage (parampara) of the Mutt originated in Udupi with Vishnu Tirtha (Madhvacharya's brother) as its first pontiff, the monastery's headquarters were shifted to its present location in Sonda by Vadiraja Tirtha in the 16th century.

Sri Vadiraja Tirtha, the 20th swami in the lineage, established the Mutt in Sonda under the patronage of the local ruler, Arasappa Nayaka. He is credited with the spiritual and architectural development of the complex, which serves as the propagation center for the Dvaita school of philosophy.

Spiritual Significance: The Mutt is the final resting place (Brindavana) of Sri Vadiraja Tirtha, a legendary figure in the Madhva tradition known for his scholarly works, social reforms, and spiritual powers. Unlike most saints whose Samadhis are single structures, the main Brindavana here is unique:

The Five Brindavanas: Sri Vadiraja is believed to have entered his Brindavana alive (Sajeeva). His central Brindavana is surrounded by four others, forming a perfect square.

Deities: The Mutt is dedicated to the worship of Lord Bhuvaraha, Lord Hayagriva, and Sri Bhutaraja.
