= Byse, Shimoga =

Byse
- village
- Location within India Location within Karnataka
- Coordinates: 13°49′45″N 75°00′43″E
- Country: India
- State: Karnataka
- District: Shimoga
- Taluka: Hosanagara

Population
  - Total: 1,019
- Time zone: UTC+5:30 (IST)
- Postal Index Number: 577418
- Census 2011 code: 608026
- ISO 3166 code: IN-KA
- Vehicle registration: KA

Byse is a village in the Shimoga district of Karnataka, India. It is located around 140 km from Mangalore, in the Nagara hobli of the Hosanagara taluka.

== History ==
Megalithic structures have been found at Byse at a site called Nilaskal Byana ("the field with the standing stones"). The villagers have long been aware of the presence of these megaliths, and a 1975 thesis by A. Sundara mentions the site as containing menhirs arranged in no particular order.

In 2007, Professor Srikumar M Menon from the Manipal School of Architecture and Planning, Manipal University noticed the stones during a trip to the Nagara Fort at Byse. Subsequently, the researchers from the Tata Institute of Fundamental Research (TIFR) and Manipal University surveyed 26 stones during 2007–10. The researchers speculated that the stones could be dated before 1000 BCE, though carbon dating is yet to be done, as of March 2012. Using computer simulation, the researchers concluded that at least one of the stone alignments at Byse has "strong astronomical associations", which indicates that the site could have been an ancient astronomical observatory.

The tallest menhir is 3.6 m in height, 1.6 m in width and 25 cm in thickness. Two menheirs are used by the villagers for a form of ancestor worship.

== Geography ==
The Kusannanakere water tank is located in Byse.

== Administration ==
The habitations that fall under the Byse gram panchayat include:

- Baise
- Konanahalli
- Kardigere
- Kuppaduru
- Kannamane
- Hokoppalau
- Chikalli
- Dhummadhagadde
- Doddagundi
- Niraballi
- Gundigadde
- Athikodige
- Sulagodu
- Channakodige

== Culture ==
The Chidambareshwara Devaru and Nethrabylu Choudi Devasthana Hindu shrines are located in Byse.
