= Anegundi =

Anegundi Anegondi Kishkindha
- Village
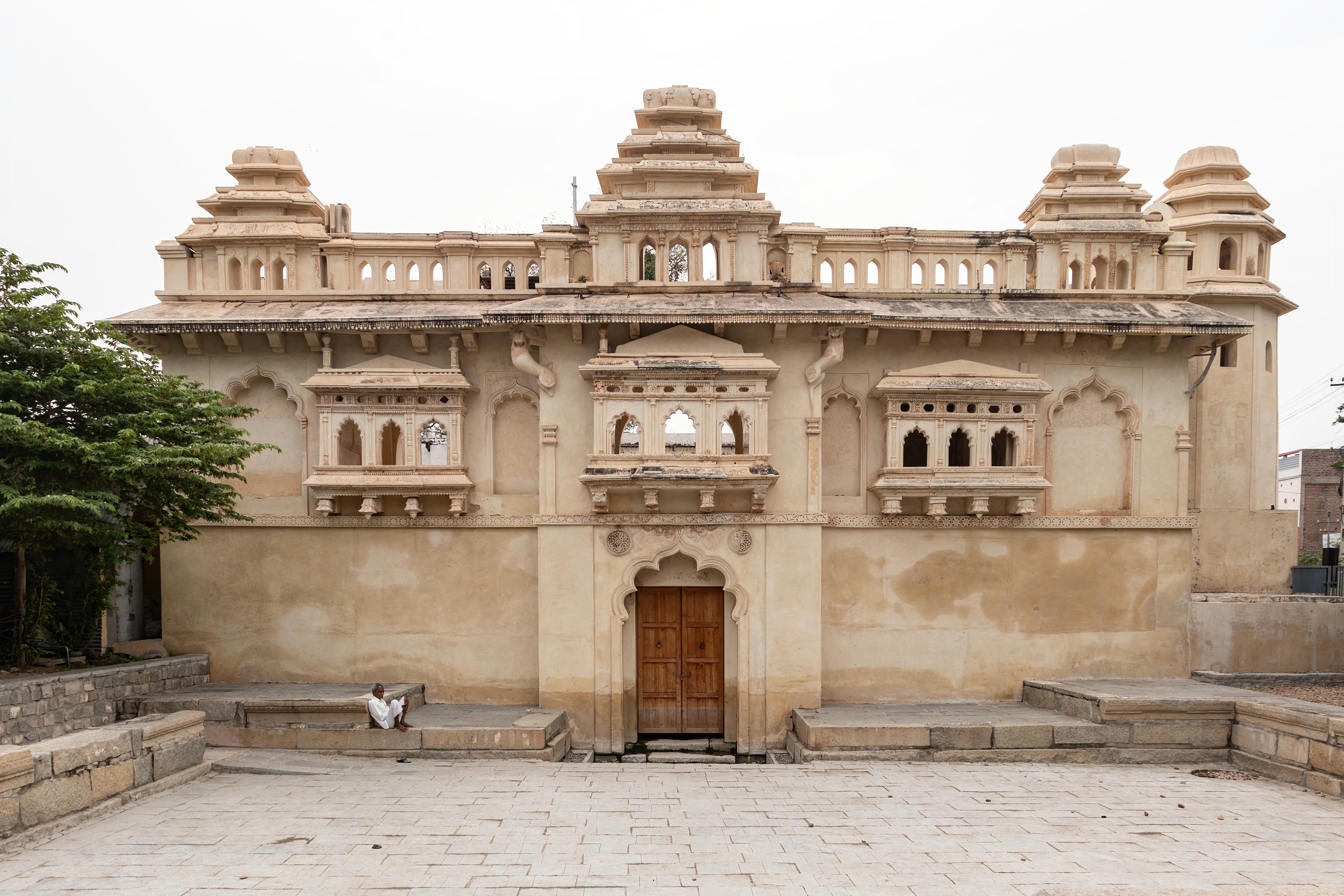
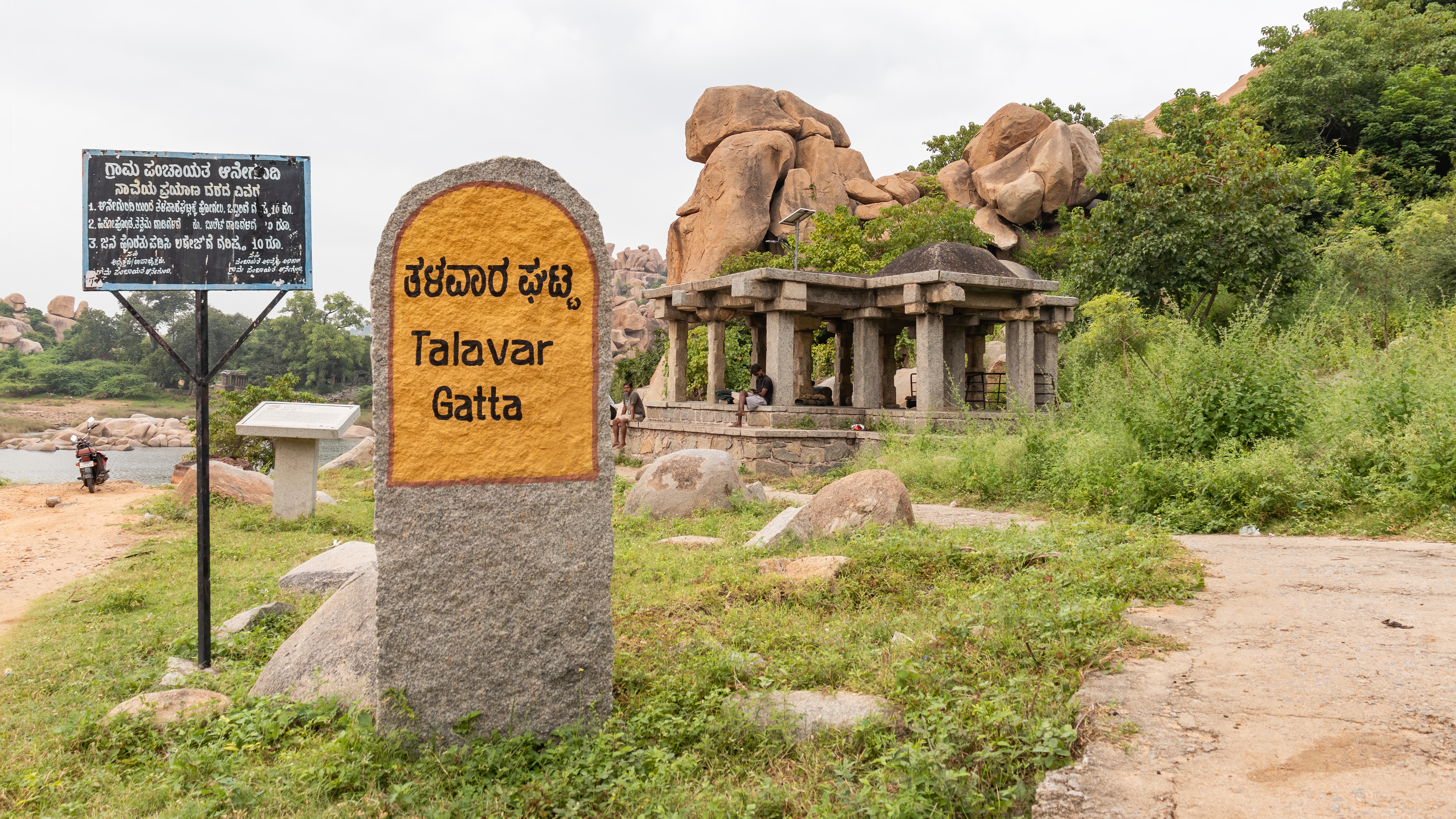
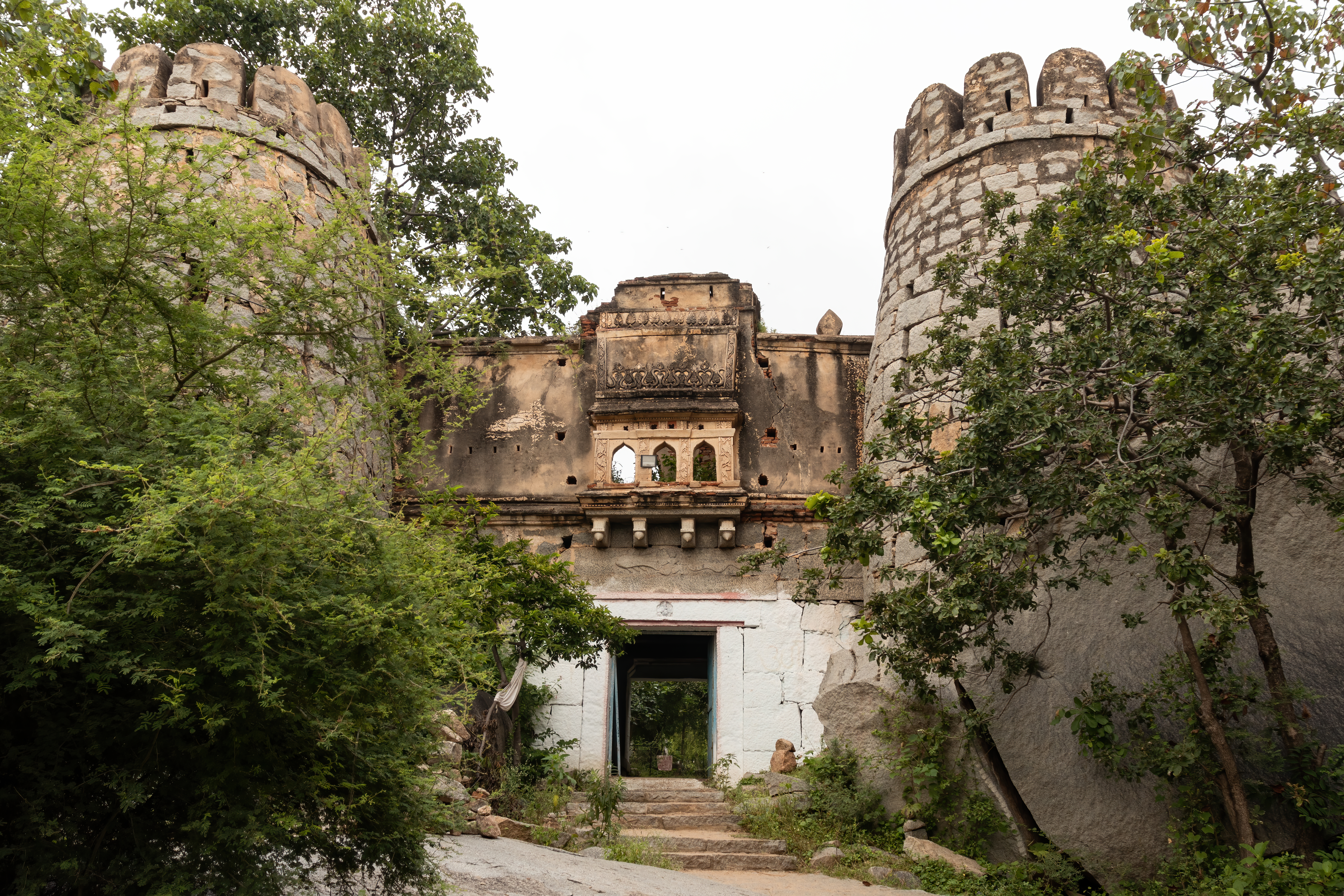
- Top to bottom: Gagan Mahal, Talavar Gatta on Tungabhadra bank, and Anegundi Fort
- Nickname: Kishkindha Nagar
- Location in Karnataka, India Anegundi (India)
- Coordinates: 15.3527°N 76.4919°E
- Country: India
- State: Karnataka
- District: Koppal District
- Elevation: 568 m (1,864 ft)

Population (2011)
  - Total: 3,733

Languages
  - Official: Kannada
- Time zone: UTC+5:30 (IST)
- Sex ratio: 1740:1757 ♂/♀

Anegundi, previously called Kishkindha, is a village in Gangavathi, Koppal district, in the Indian state of Karnataka. It is older than Hampi, situated on the northern bank of the Tungabhadra River. Nimvapuram, a nearby village, has a mount of ash believed to be the cremated remains of the king Vali.

== History ==
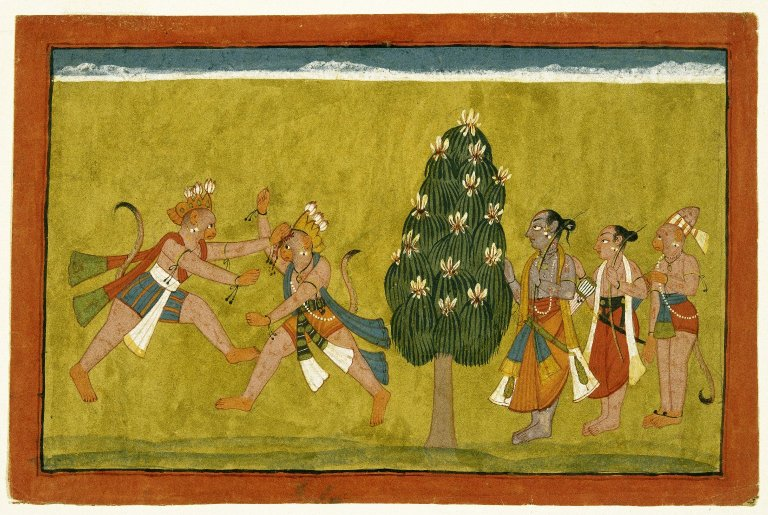
Brooklyn Museum - Vali and Sugriva Fighting Folio from the Dispersed Shangri Ramayana

Anegundi (ಆನೆಗುಂದಿ) was believed to be the monkey kingdom of Kishkindha, with Kishkinta meaning a forest where the monkeys lived. The epic of Ramayana is at a distance of 5 kilometres (3.1 mi) from the historical site of Hampi. Anjanadri Hill, the birthplace of the god Hanuman, and the mountain Rishimuka are places near and affiliated with Ramayana. It is said to have one of the oldest plateaus on the planet, estimated to be 3,000 million years old. Only local story-tellers refer to Anegundi as the maternal home of Bhoodevi (Mother Earth).

The village, located on the northern bank of River Tungabhadra, was said to be the legendary Kishkindha, a kingdom of the prince Sugriva as well as the historic site of the Krishnadevaraya dynasty in the Vijayanagar Empire.

=== Prehistoric ===
Neolithic history is represented in this region by Mourya Mane, an ancient Stone Age Colony. Several Neolithic dwellings still bear paintings that are clear and intact even to this day at Onke Kindi. In this human settlement, there are traces of Microlithic, Megalithic, and Neolithic Ages. As per geologists, the Anegundi area is about four billion years old. To date, this village is a living heritage site. Pre-historic rock shelters and paintings are found in the Tungabhadra River valley.

==== Rock art ====
In Anegundi, there is a prehistoric settlement called Onake Kindi. The boulders have rock art, with some red and white markings depicting figures of humans and bulls. On another boulder, there is a circular diagram like a sun and moon with some symbolism. The rock paintings belonged to the Iron Age, dating back to 1500 BC; the faded circular painting is a very rare depiction of a megalithic style of burial, which includes a human body in the middle surrounded by a stone circle and burial goods. The site of megalithic dolmens is located up in the hills, locals call it Mourya Mane (mourya is short in the local language), about five to seven feet high sheet rock forms four walls, and another rock sheet used as a roof (Neolithic period). It is about 10 kilometres (6.2 mi) away from Anegundi, the Neolithic dwellings in the Elu gudda hill range, from Benegal to Indaragi gudda. About 1.5 kilometres (0.93 mi) from Anegundi, there are rock shelters and paintings, paintings found in the hill ranges called locally as Elu gudda Salu.

=== Ramayana connection ===
Pampa Sarovar is related to Shiva and Parvati, both of whom were featured in Ramayana; Sabari, a devotee of Rama met here, the legends of Ramayana are pervading around Anegundi. The pilgrims consider Pampa Sarovara a holy place.

=== Pre-Vijayanagara period ===
Anegundi in Kannada means Elephant Gorge, and is older than Hampi. Anegundi history dates back to 3rd century BC, when the city was under the Ashoka Empire. Anegundi was ruled by various dynasties: Shatavahanas, Kadambas, Chalukyas, Rashtrakutas, Delhi Sultanate, Vijayanagara Empire and Bahamanis.

=== Vijayanagara period ===
In the early 14th century, an elephant enclosure in Kannada opened known as Anegundi, named after the elephants contingent of the Vijayanagar army. Kannada was the first capital of the Vijayanagar Empire and several other dynasties. In 1334, Deva Raya the Chief Minister of Anegundi became ruler of Anegundi. When Delhi Sultans invaded Warangal, Harihara and Bukka escaped and came to Anegundi, later founded the Vijayanagar Empire at Hampi. Today, the bridge has collapsed and is under construction. The river can be crossed in a coracle, a circular basket shaped made of cane and bamboo. Coracles were used as transportation during the Vijayanagara period. It is mentioned by Dominoes Paes, the Portuguese traveller in the 16th century, with a coracle carrying "about twenty persons and horses and oxen to cross the river."

During the 16th—18th centuries, Anegundi was ruled by Bijapur Sultans, Moghuls, Marathas and Tipu Sultan. According to the 1824 treaty between the British and Hyderabad Nizam, the king of Vijayanagar that ruled Hampi lost his kingdom and was provided a monthly pension of Rs 300. He was later forced to leave Hampi and make Anegundi as his official residence. Rani Lalkumari Bai, his last descendant, received monthly pension.

=== Anegundi Fort ===
Anegundi has a fort with many gates. There is a Ganesha cave temple. Vijayanagar kings used to pray before every battle at the Durga temple, and visited the Pampa Sarovar and Shri Lakshmi temple.

== Gallery ==
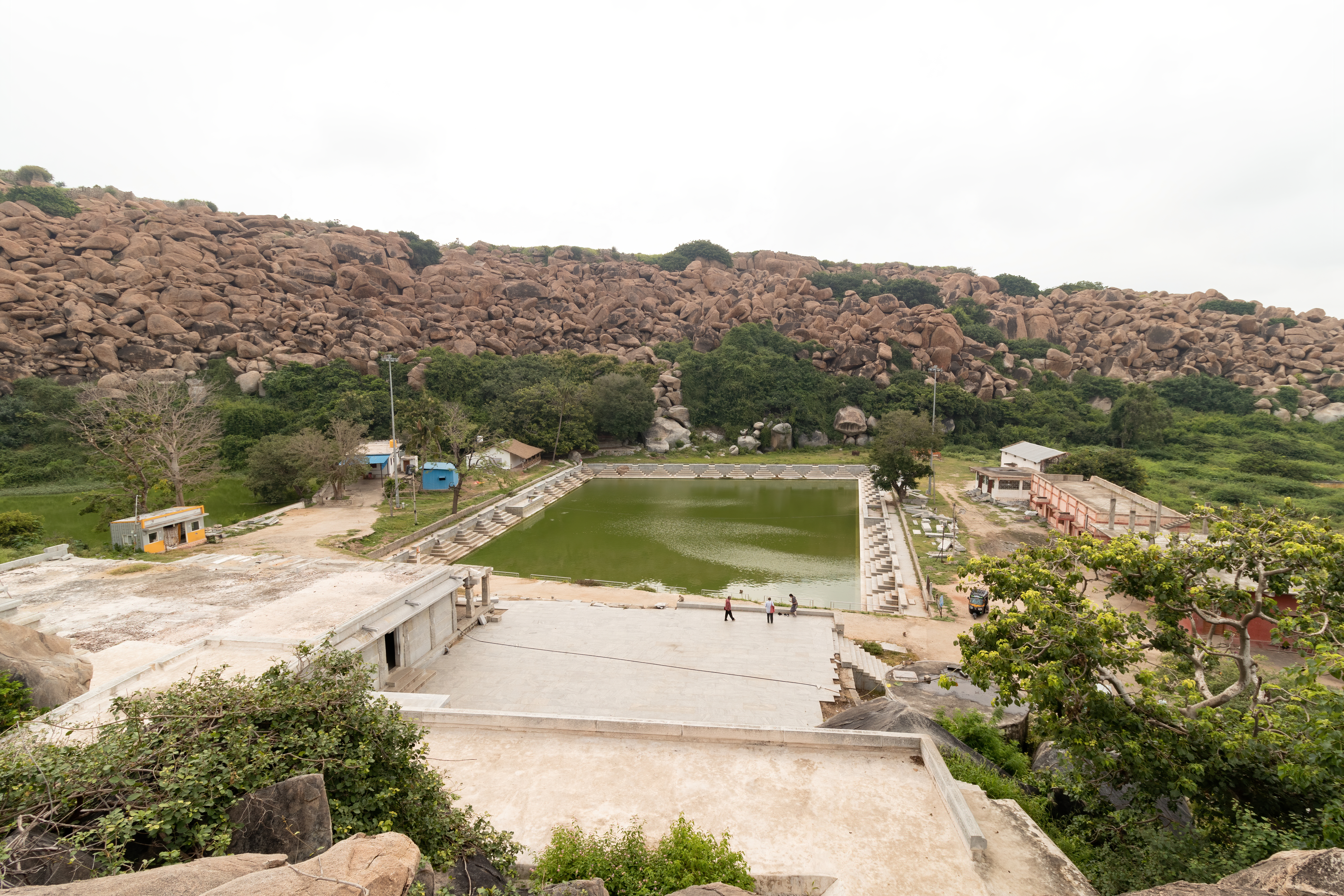
Pampa Sarovar

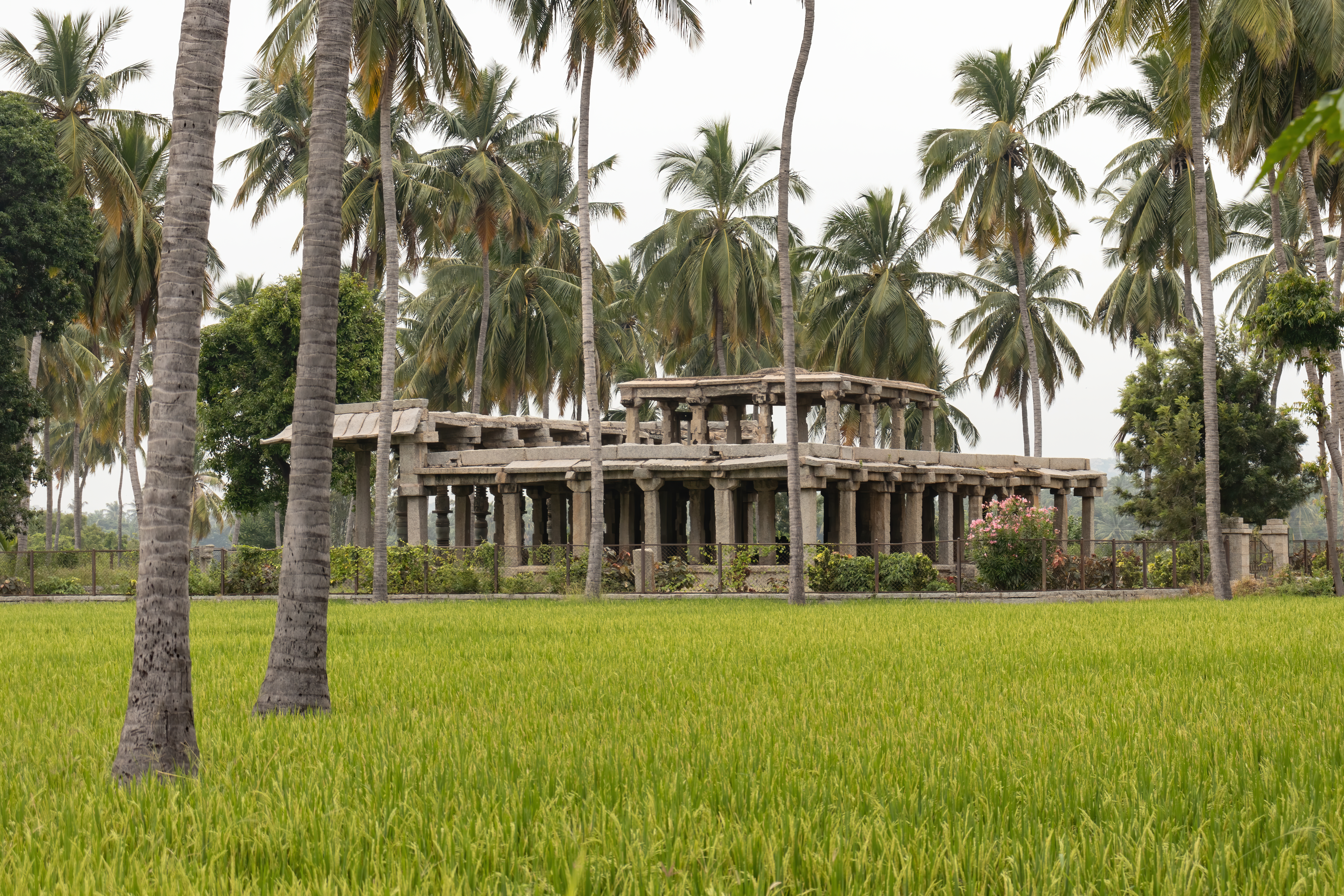
Hachappa Mantapa

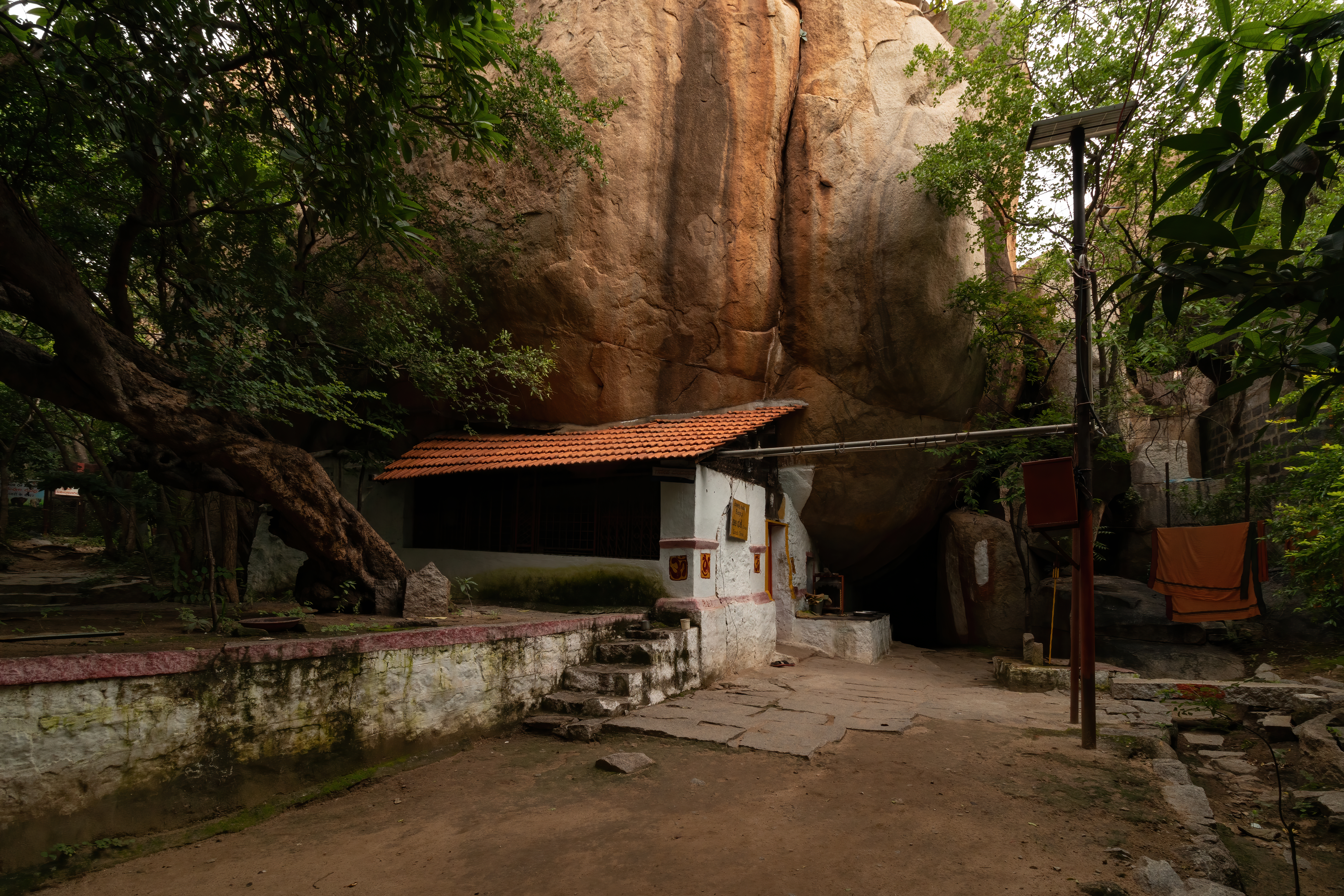
Entrance to Valikote Cave (Vali Cave)

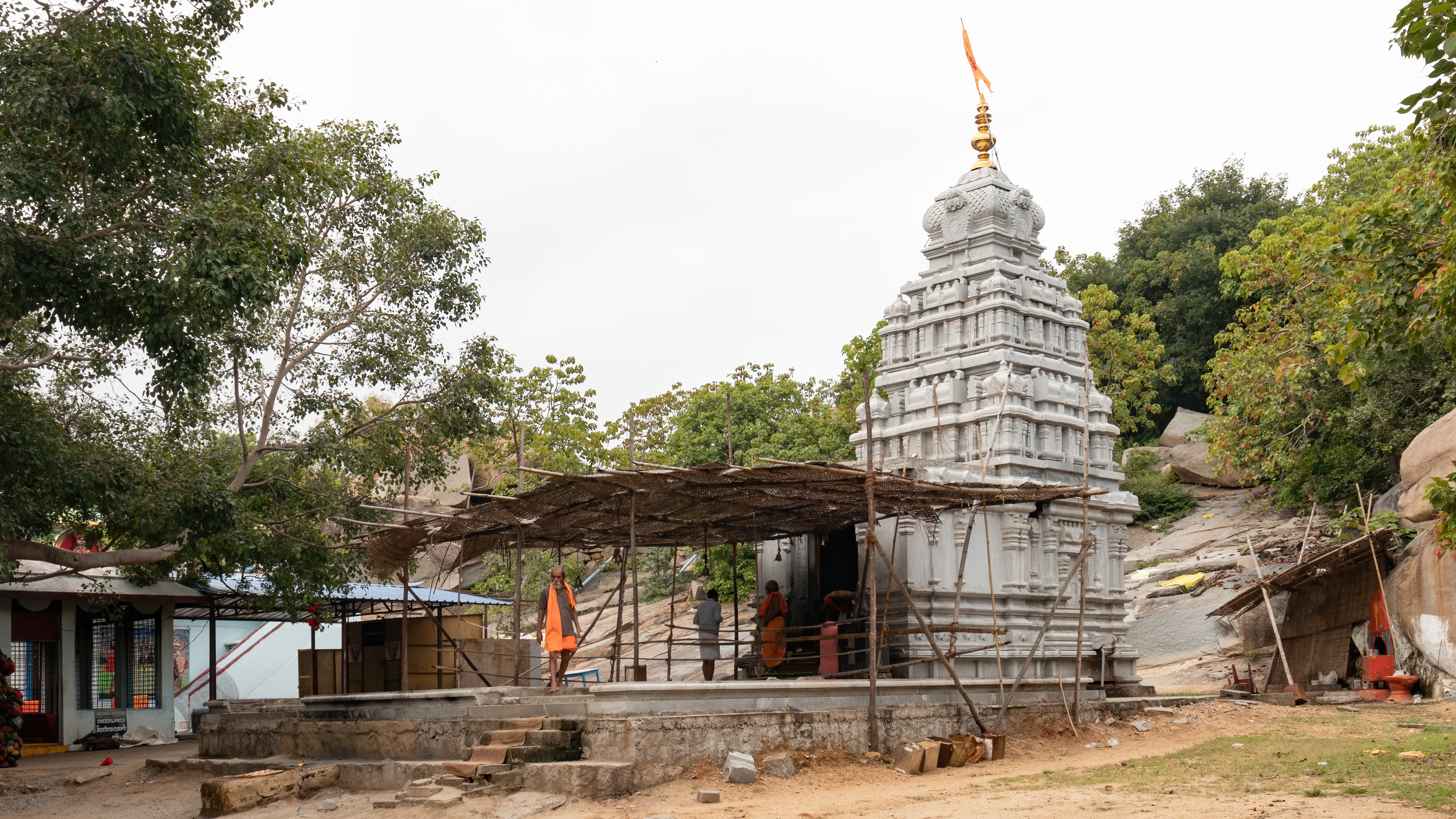
Shri Durgamma Devi Ammanavara Temple on Anegundi fort

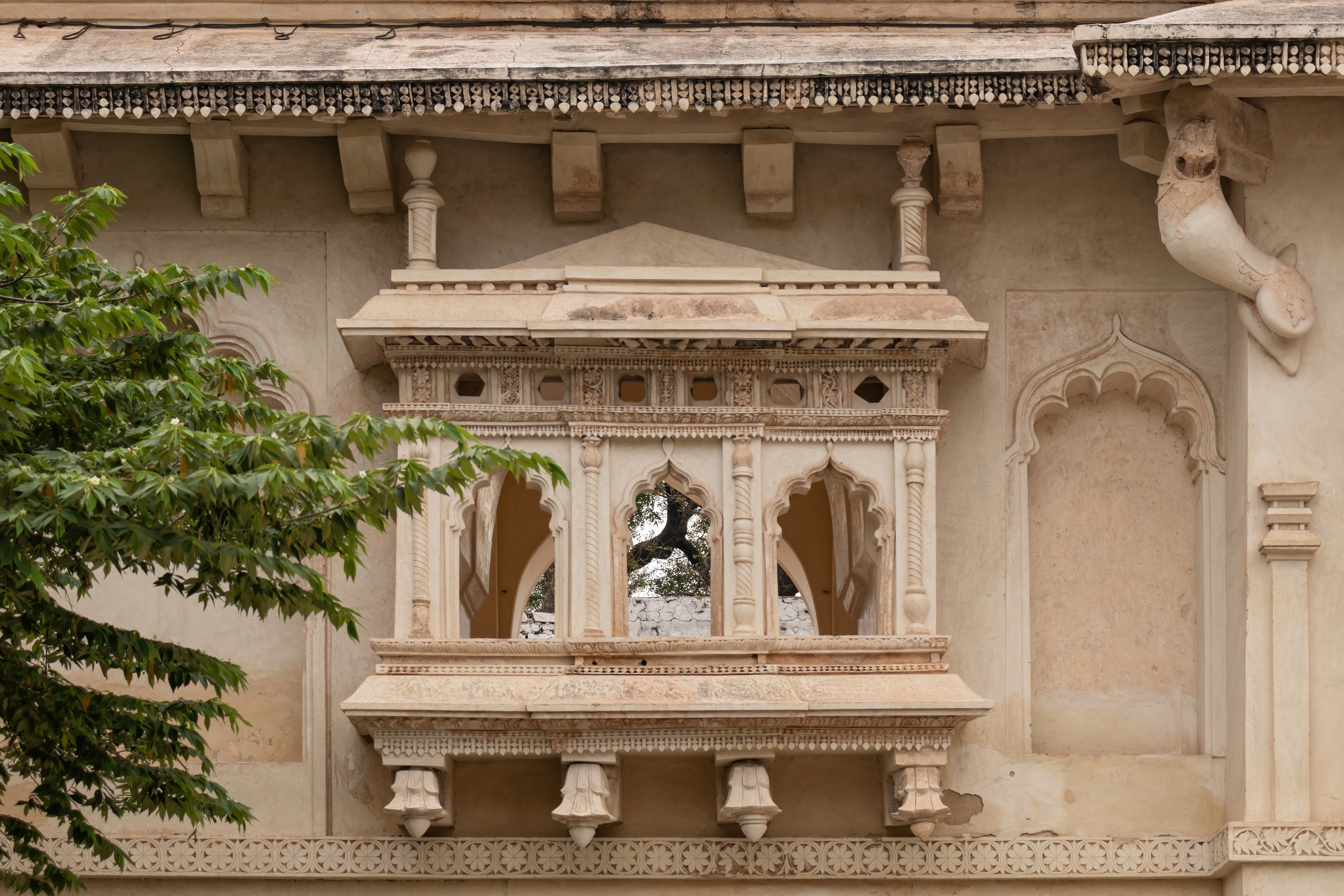
A bay window on Gagan Mahal palace

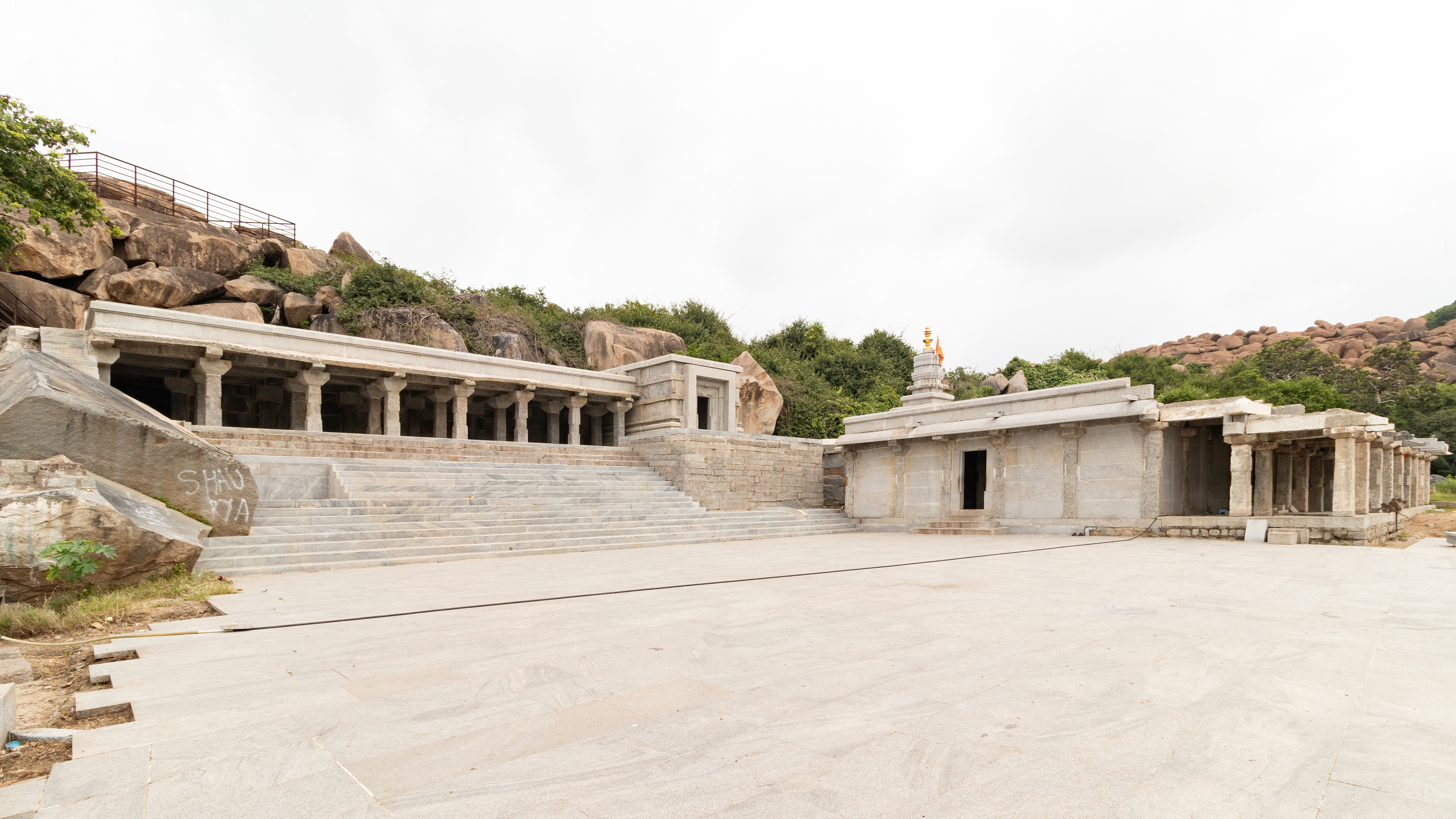
Shri Vijayalakshmi Devi Temple near Pampa Sarovar

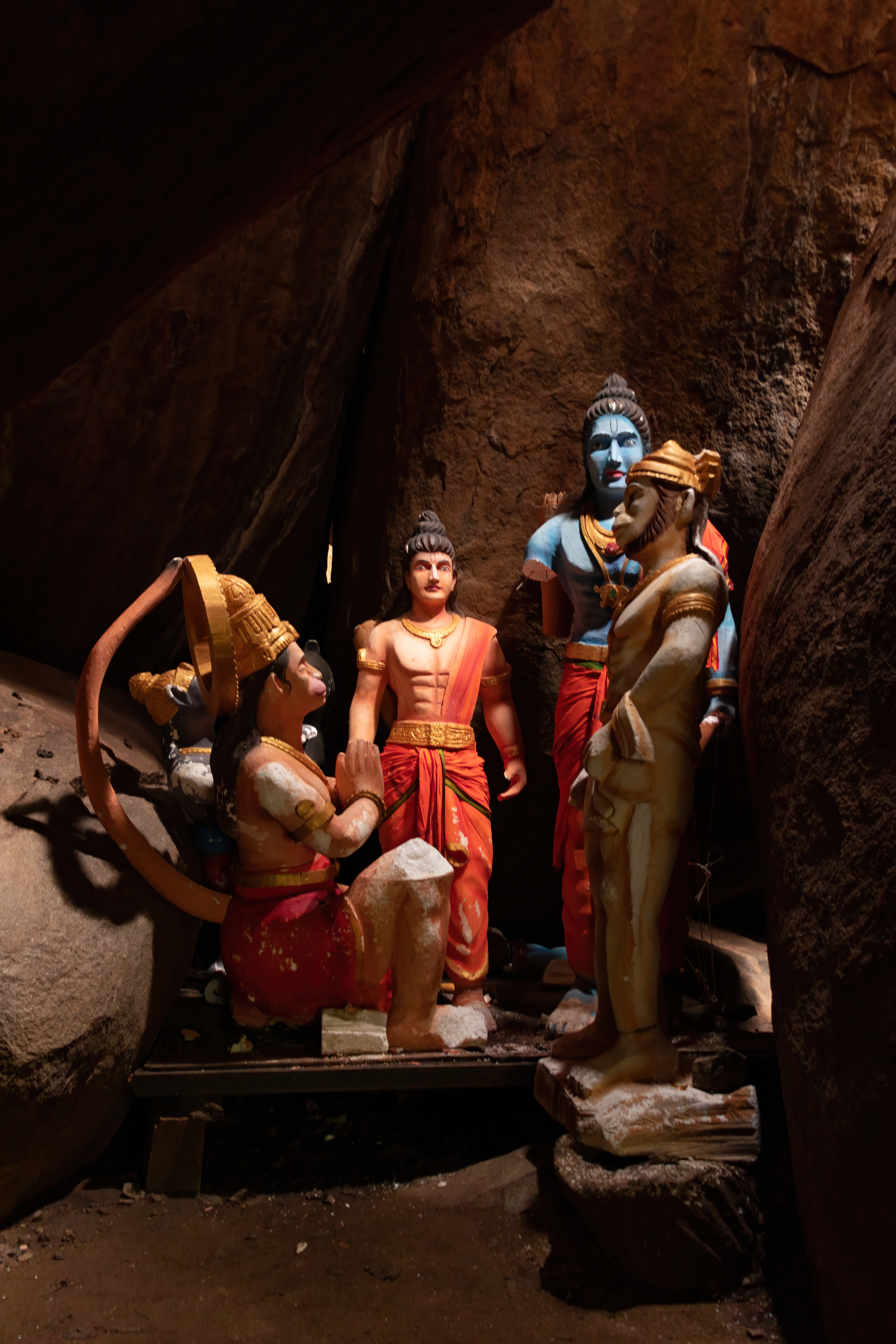
Statues inside Valikote Cave

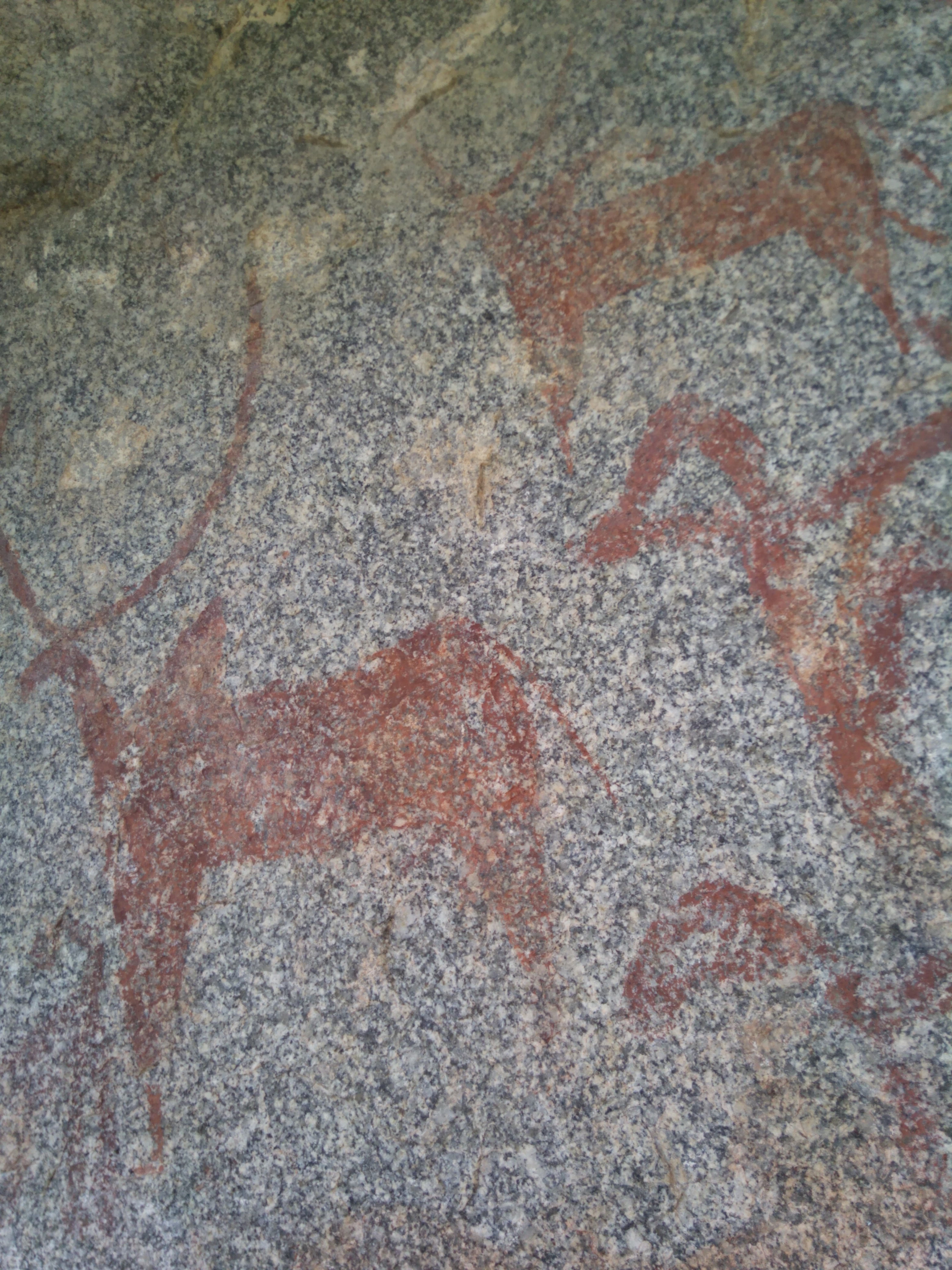
Rock Art at Onake Kindi

== See also ==
- Vijayanagara
- Hampi
- List of State Protected Monuments in Karnataka
- Indian rock-cut architecture
- Kingdoms of Ancient India
- Kishkindha
- Ramayana
- Indian Geography
