= Chilakamukhi =

- Village
- Location within Karnataka Location within India
- Coordinates: 15°30′51″N 76°14′38″E
- Country: India
- State: Karnataka
- District: Koppal district
- Taluk: Koppal

Population (2001)
  - Total: 1,502

Languages
  - Official: Kannada
- Time zone: UTC+5:30 (IST)
- Telephone code: 08539
- Vehicle registration: KA 37

Chilakamukhi also spelled as Chilkmukhi is a village in the Koppal taluk of Koppal district in the Indian state of Karnataka. Chilakamukhi is located northeast to District Headquarters Koppal.

== Demographics ==
As of 2001 India census, Chilakamukhi had a population of 1,502 with 755 males and 747 females and 239 Households.

== See also ==
- Bewoor
- Kukanapalli
- Irakalgada
- Bahaddur Bandi
- Kushtagi
- Hospet
- Koppal
