= Hulihaidar =

Village in India

- Village
- Location within Karnataka Location within India
- Coordinates: 15°39′30.91″N 76°23′28.48″E
- Country: India
- State: Karnataka
- District: Koppal district
- Taluk: Gangavathi

Population (2001)
  - Total: 4,149

Languages
  - Official: Kannada
- Time zone: UTC+5:30 (IST)
- Vehicle registration: KA 37

Hulihaidar is a village in the Gangavathi taluk of Koppal district in the Indian state of Karnataka. Hulihaidar lies on Karnataka State Highway 29 connecting Kanakagiri and Tavaragera.

== Demographics ==
As of the 2001 India census, Hulihaidar had a population of 4,149 with 2,116 males and 2,033 females and 657 Households.

== See also ==
- Pura, Kushtagi
- Tavaragera
- Kanakagiri
- Navali gangavathi
- Gangavathi
- Koppal
