= Budugumpa, Koppal =

Budugumpa
- Village
- Location within Karnataka Location within India
- Coordinates: 15°23′38.06″N 76°18′47.84″E
- Country: India
- State: Karnataka
- District: Koppal district
- Taluk: Koppal

Population (2001)
  - Total: 3,530

Languages
  - Official: Kannada
- Time zone: UTC+5:30 (IST)
- Telephone code: 08539
- Vehicle registration: KA 37

Budugumpa also spelled as Boodugumpa is a village in the Koppal taluk of Koppal district in the Indian state of Karnataka.

== Geography ==
Budugumpa is located northeast to District Headquarters Koppal. Budugumpa Cross is the grade-separated intersection point of National Highway 50 and State Highway 23.

== Demographics ==
As of 2001 India census, Budugumpa had a population of 3,530 with 1,824 males and 1,706 females and 573 Households.

== See also ==
- Gangavathi
- Kukanapalli
- Kushtagi
- Hospet
- Koppal
