= Kalmangi =

Kalmangi Kalamangi
- Village
- Location within Karnataka Location within India
- Coordinates: 15°43′36.32″N 76°32′37.55″E
- Country: India
- State: Karnataka
- District: Raichur district
- Taluk: Sindhanur

Population (2001)
  - Total: 2,478

Languages
  - Official: Kannada
- Time zone: UTC+5:30 (IST)
- Telephone code: 08535
- Vehicle registration: KA 36

Kalamangi, also spelled as Kalamangi is a village near Turvihal in the Sindhanur taluk of Raichur district, in the Indian state of Karnataka. Kalmangi lies on the road connecting Sindhanur-Kushtagi.

== Demographics ==
As of 2001 census, Kalmangi had a population of 2,478 with 1,222 males and 1,256 females, and 429 households.

== See also ==
- Pura, Kushtagi
- Tavaragera
- Kanakagiri
- Navali gangavathi
- Sindhanur
- Raichur
