= Hiresindhogi =

Village in India

Hiresindhogi Hire Sindhogi
- Village
- Location within Karnataka Location within India
- Coordinates: 15°17′47″N 76°5′32″E
- Country: India
- State: Karnataka
- District: Koppal district
- Taluk: Koppal

Population (2001)
  - Total: 3,624

Languages
  - Official: Kannada
- Time zone: UTC+5:30 (IST)
- PIN: 583 231
- Telephone code: 08539
- Vehicle registration: KA 37

Hiresindhogi also spelled as Hire Sindhogi is a village in the Koppal taluk of Koppal district in the Indian state of Karnataka. Hiresindhogi is located South to District Headquarters Koppal and is 12 km from Koppal city.

== Importance ==
Coins belonging to ancient era have been excavated in Hiresindhogi.

== Demographics ==
As of 2001 India census, Hiresindhogi had a population of 3,624 with 1,814 males and 1,810 females and 677 Households.

== See also ==
- Gangavathi
- Irakalgada
- Kushtagi
- Hospet
- Koppal
