= Mandalagiri =

- Village
- Location within Karnataka Location within India
- Coordinates: 15°27′33.53″N 75°57′35.80″E
- Country: India
- State: Karnataka
- District: Koppal district

Languages
  - Official: Kannada
- Time zone: UTC+5:30 (IST)
- PIN: 583232
- Telephone code: 08534
- Vehicle registration: KA-37

Mandalagiri is a village in the Yelburga taluk of Koppal district in the Indian state of Karnataka. Mandalagiri is 10 km from Kuknoor and 30 km from Gadag. Mandalagiri can be reached by Gadag-Kuknoor route.

== See also ==
- Yarehanchinal
- Binnal
- Chikkenakoppa
- Bhatapanahalli
- Itagi
- Kuknoor
- Yelburga
- Koppal
- Karnataka
