= Sanganahala =

Village in India

Sanganahala Sanganala
- Village
- Location within Karnataka Location within India
- Coordinates: 15°34′17″N 75°59′21″E
- Country: India
- State: Karnataka
- District: Koppal district
- Taluk: Yelburga
- Lok Sabha Constituency: Koppal

Languages
  - Official: Kannada
- Time zone: UTC+5:30 (IST)
- Telephone code: 08534
- Vehicle registration: KA 37

Sanganahala is a village in the Yelburga taluk of Koppal district in the Indian state of Karnataka. There are 307 houses in the village.

== See also ==
- Benakal
- Kallur, Yelburga
- Hampi
- Koppal
- Karnataka
