= Kinnal =

Village in Karnataka, India

- Village
- Location of Kinnal in Karnataka
- Coordinates: 15°26′35″N 76°8′23″E
- Country: India
- State: Karnataka
- Division: Gulbarga
- District: Koppal
- Time zone: UTC+05:30 (IST)
- Postal Index Number: 583231
- Vehicle registration: KA 37
- Telephone: 91-(0)8539
- Spoken languages: Kannada
- Website: www.koppal.nic.in/Placesofinterst/tourism.htm

Kinnal, also called Kinhal, is a village in the southern state of Karnataka, India. It is located in the Koppal taluk of Koppal district in Karnataka. This village is famous for Kinnal craft. Recently this craft has been granted geographical indication, and its GI tag number is 159.

== Demographics ==
As of the 2001 India census, Kinhal had a population of 8873, with 4480 males and 4393 females.

== Transport ==
There are buses from Koppal town to Kinnal Village on a regular basis. The nearest major town is Koppal. From Koppal one can catch buses and trains to other places.

== See also ==
- Hampi
- Anegondi
- Kuknur
- Kanakagiri
- Yelburga
- Karatagi
- Kushtagi
- Koppal
- Karnataka
