= Bahaddur Bandi =

- Village
- Location within Karnataka Location within India
- Coordinates: 15°18′52″N 76°9′41″E
- Country: India
- State: Karnataka
- District: Koppal district
- Taluk: Koppal

Population (2001)
  - Total: 2,545

Languages
  - Official: Kannada
- Time zone: UTC+5:30 (IST)
- Telephone code: 08539
- Vehicle registration: KA 37

Bahaddur Bandi, also spelled Bahaddurbandi is a village in the Koppal taluk of Koppal district in the Indian state of Karnataka. Bahaddur Bandi is located south to District Headquarters Koppal and is 4 km from Koppal city.

== Bahaddur Bandi Fort ==
The Koppal fort was built during the rule of Shivaji and the fort at Bahaddur Bandi was constructed by Nawab Hyder Ali's aide Mohammad Usman.This fort is also the site where Tipu Sultan defeated the Marathas in 1787 and captured the fort.

== Demographics ==
As of 2001 India census, Bahaddur Bandi had a population of 2,545 with 1,300 males and 1,245 females and 422 Households.

== See also ==
- Gangavathi
- Irakalgada
- Kushtagi
- Hospet
- Koppal
