= Bhagyanagar =

Town in Koppal district, India

- Town
- Location of Bhagyanagar in Karnataka
- Coordinates: 15°21′49.70412″N 76°08′36.6666″E
- Country: India
- State: Karnataka
- Division: Kalaburagi
- District: Koppal
- Time zone: UTC+05:30 (IST)
- Postal Index Number: 583238
- Vehicle registration: KA 37
- Telephone: 91-(0)8539
- Spoken languages: Kannada
- Website: www.koppal.nic.in/Placesofinterst/tourism.htm

Bhagyanagar a twin city of Koppal, located one kilometre away from Koppal, is a town panchayat area. The city is known for power handloom work, and is a major producer of saris.

== Demographics ==
As of the 2001 India census, Bhagyanagar had a population of 8873 with 4480 males and 4393 females. the famous Amba Bhavani Temple and Sri Nimishambha Temple of Soma Vamsha Arya Kshatriya (Chitragar) Society.

== Transport ==
There are buses from Koppal town.

== See also ==
- Hampi
- Anegondi
- Kuknur
- Kanakagiri
- Yelburga
- Karatagi
- Kushtagi
- Koppal
- Karnataka
