= Advibhavi =

Advibhavi may refer to:

- Advibhavi (Gangawati), a village in Karnataka, India
- Advibhavi (Kushtagi), a village in Karnataka, India
- Advibhavi (Maski), a village in Karnataka, India
- Advibhavi (Mudgal), a village in Karnataka, India
