= Bhatapanahalli =

- Village
- Location within Karnataka Location within India
- Coordinates: 15°28′37.39″N 75°56′37.63″E
- Country: India
- State: Karnataka
- District: Koppal district

Languages
  - Official: Kannada
- Time zone: UTC+5:30 (IST)
- PIN: 583232
- Telephone code: 08534
- Vehicle registration: KA-37

Bhatapanahalli is a village in the Yelburga taluk of Koppal district in the Indian state of Karnataka. Bhatapanahalli is 6 km from Kuknoor and 40 km from Gadag. Bhatapanahalli can be reached by Gadag-Kuknoor route via Harlapur-Binnal.

== See also ==
- Mandalagiri
- Itagi
- Kuknoor
- Yelburga
- Koppal
- Karnataka
