= Rajooru =

Village in India

Rajooru Rajur
- Village
- Location within Karnataka Location within India
- Coordinates: 15°31′45″N 75°59′17″E
- Country: India
- State: Karnataka
- District: Koppal district
- Taluk: Yelburga
- Lok Sabha Constituency: Koppal

Languages
  - Official: Kannada
- Time zone: UTC+5:30 (IST)
- Telephone code: 08534
- Vehicle registration: KA 37

Rajooru also spelled Rajur is a village in the Kukanoor taluk of Koppal district in the Indian state of Karnataka.

== See also ==
- Benakal
- Munirabad
- Hampi
- Koppal
- Karnataka
