= Yelburthi =

Village in India

- Village
- Interactive map of Yelburthi
- Coordinates: 15.72764°N 76.125810°E
- Country: India
- State: Karnataka
- District: Koppal
- Talukas: Kushtagi

Government
  - Body: Gram panchayat
- Elevation: 655 m (2,149 ft)

Languages
  - Official: Kannada
- Time zone: UTC+5:30 (IST)
- ISO 3166 code: IN-KA
- Vehicle registration: KA
- Nearest city: Koppal
- Website: karnataka.gov.in

Yelburthi is a village in the southern state of Karnataka, India. It is located in the Kushtagi taluk of Koppal district in Karnataka.

== See also ==
- Koppal
- Districts of Karnataka
