= Basapattana =

Basapattana ಬಸಾಪಟ್ಟಣ
- village
- Country: India
- State: Karnataka
- District: Koppal
- Taluk: Gangavathi

Government
  - Body: Gram panchayat

Area
  - Total: 12.61 km^{2} (4.87 sq mi)

Population (2011)
  - Total: 8,972
  - Density: 711.5/km^{2} (1,843/sq mi)

Languages
  - Official: Kannada
- Time zone: UTC+5:30 (IST)
- Postal code: 583235
- ISO 3166 code: IN-KA
- Vehicle registration: KA 37
- Website: karnataka.gov.in

Basapattana is a village in the southern state of Karnataka, India. It is located in the Gangavathi taluk of Koppal district in Karnataka.

== Demographics ==
As of the 2011 Indian census, Basapattana had a population of 8,972 with 4,528 males and 4,444 females. The overall literacy rate of Basapattana is 57.97%, out of which 64.91% of males and 50.90% of females are literate. There are about 1,647 houses in Basapattana.

== See also ==
- Koppal
- Districts of Karnataka
