= National Highway 367A (India) =

National Highway in India

National Highway 367A
- Map of National Highway 367A in red

Route information
- Auxiliary route of NH 67
- Length: 28.73 km (17.85 mi)

Major junctions
- South end: Koppal
- North end: Metgal

Location
- Country: India
- States: Karnataka

Highway system
- Roads in India; Expressways; National; State; Asian
← NH 67	→ NH 50

National Highway 367A, commonly referred to as NH 367A is a national highway in India. It is a spur road of National Highway 67. NH-367A runs in the state of Karnataka in India.

== Route ==
NH 367A connects Koppal city and Metgal via Irkalgada of Koppal district in the state of Karnataka.

== Junctions ==
NH 67 Terminal near Koppal.
NH 50 Terminal near Metgal.

== See also ==
- List of national highways in India
- List of national highways in India by state
