= Irakalgada =

Village in India

- Village
- Location within Karnataka Location within India
- Coordinates: 15°28′2″N 76°13′15″E
- Country: India
- State: Karnataka
- District: Koppal district
- Taluk: Koppal

Population (2001)
  - Total: 3,406

Languages
  - Official: Kannada
- Time zone: UTC+5:30 (IST)
- Telephone code: 08539
- Vehicle registration: KA 37

Irakalgada also spelled as Irkalgada is a village near Bewoor in the Koppal taluk of Koppal district in the Indian state of Karnataka. Irakalgada is located north to District Headquarters Koppal. Irakalgada lies on Karnataka State highway 36 connecting Koppal-Kushtagi. Irakalgada is 12 km from Koppal.

== Irakalgada Fort ==
Irakalgada Fort is one of the attractions in Irakalgada.

== Demographics ==
As of 2001 India census, Irakalagad had a population of 4,762 with 1,736 males and 1,670 females and 631 Households.

== See also ==
- Gangavathi
- Kukanapalli
- Kushtagi
- Bewoor
- Koppal
