= Tawargera =

Village in India

- village
- Interactive map of Tawargera
- Country: India
- State: Karnataka
- District: Koppal
- Talukas: Kushtagi

Government
  - Body: Town panchayat

Population (2001)
  - Total: 13,652

Languages
  - Official: Kannada
- Time zone: UTC+5:30 (IST)
- ISO 3166 code: IN-KA
- Vehicle registration: KA 37
- Website: karnataka.gov.in

Tawargera is a Town Panchayat in the southern state of Karnataka, India. It is located in the Kushtagi taluk of Koppal district in Karnataka.

== Demographics ==
As of 2001 India census, Tawargera had a population of 13652 with 6965 males and 6687 females.

== See also ==
- Koppal
- Districts of Karnataka
