= Koppal railway station =

Railway station in Karnataka, India

Koppal

General information
- Location: Railway station road Koppal,Koppal district, Karnataka; India
- Coordinates: 15°21′14″N 76°07′57″E
- System: Indian Railways station
- Owner: Indian Railways
- Operator: South Western Railway
- Line: Guntakal–Vasco da Gama section
- Platforms: 3
- Tracks: 6

Construction
- Structure type: Standard (on-ground station)
- Parking: No
- Cycle facilities: No

Other information
- Status: Functioning
- Station code: GIN
- Zone(s): South Western Railway
- Division(s): Hubli

History
- Electrified: Double Line Electrified
Location
- Location within Karnataka

Koppal railway station (station code: KBL) is an NSG-5 Category Station under the Hubli railway division of the South Western Railway, located in Koppal district, Karnataka, India. The station has three platforms that primarily cater to Koppal City and nearby villages.

== Developments ==
In 2012, a proposal was put forth to construct a new BG railway line covering a distance of 125 km from Almatti to Koppal, via Kudulsangama, Hungund, Ilkal, and Kushtagi. The project's estimated cost was 904.05 Cr, with a return on investment of +12.01% for the Ministry of Railways. However, in 2016, the Ministry of Railways abandoned the proposal, citing the need for infrastructural improvements and the doubling of the Hotgi-Kudgi-Gadag railway line to handle the coal supply traffic to the Kudgi Super Thermal Power Plant.

== Major trains ==
Trains that run through/from Koppal are:

- Hampi Express
- Amaravati Express
- Haripriya Express
- Hubballi–Karatagi Unreserved Express
- Karatagi-Hubballi Unreserved Express
- Hubballi–Karatagi Special Express
- Karatagi-Hubballi Special Express
- Yesvantpur–Karatagi Express
- Karatagi-Yesvantpur Express
- Hubballi-Tirupati Special fare Express
- Tirupati-Hubballi Special fare Express
- Hubballi–Hosapete DEMU Passenger
- Hosapete-Hubballi DEMU Passenger
- Hubballi–Guntakal Passenger
- Guntakal–Hubballi Passenger
- Belagavi–Secunderabad Daily Special Fare Exp
- Vijaypura–Yesvantpur Daily Special Fare Exp
- YPR-NZM Karnataka Sampark kranti 5 days a week Exp Via Ballari
- Vasco–Hyderabad/Tirupati Weekly Exp
- Jodhpur–KSR Bengaluru Weekly Exp
- Ajmer–KSR Bengaluru Weekly Exp
- Sainagar Shirdi–Mysuru Weekly Exp
- Vasco–Shalimar Amaravati Quarterly Exp
- Vasco–Jasidih Weekly Exp
- Hubballi-MGR Chennai Central Bi-Weekly Express
