= Binnal =

Binnal Binnala
- Village
- Location within Karnataka Location within India
- Coordinates: 15°29′35.03″N 75°52′30.52″E
- Country: India
- State: Karnataka
- District: Koppal district
- Taluk: Yelburga

Population (2021)
  - Total: 5,000

Languages
  - Official: Kannada
- Time zone: UTC+5:30 (IST)
- PIN: 583232
- Telephone code: 08534
- Vehicle registration: KA-37

Binnal is a village in the Kukanoor taluk of Koppal district in the Indian state of Karnataka. Binnal is 15 km from Kuknoor and 30 km from Gadag. Binnal can be reached by Gadag-Kuknoor route via Harlapur-Yarehanchinal.

== Demographics ==
As of 2021 India census, Binnal had a population of 5000 with 2800 males and 2200 females and 500 Households.

== See also ==
- Lakkundi
- Itagi
- Kuknoor
- Yelburga
- Koppal
- Karnataka
