= Turvihal =

Turvihal Turvihala
- Town
- Location within Karnataka Location within India
- Coordinates: 15°45′40.96″N 76°35′47.12″E
- Country: India
- State: Karnataka
- District: Raichur district
- Taluk: Sindhanur

Population (2001)
  - Total: 12,356

Languages
  - Official: Kannada
- Time zone: UTC+5:30 (IST)
- PIN: 584132
- Telephone code: 08535
- Vehicle registration: KA-36

Turvihal, also spelled as Turvihala, This village first name is Gokshir it means Cows milk and is a village in the Sindhanur taluk of Raichur district in the Indian state of Karnataka. . Turvihal lies on Karnataka State Highway 6 connecting Sindhanur-Kushtagi.

== Demographics ==
As of 2001 India census, Turvihal had a population of 12356 with 6150 males and 6206 females.

== See also ==
- Pura, Kushtagi
- Tavaragera
- Kanakagiri
- Navali gangavathi
- Sindhanur
- Raichur
