= Agoli =

Coordinates: 27°53′N 78°40′E

- Village
- Interactive map of Agoli
- Country: India
- State: Karnataka
- District: Koppal
- Talukas: Gangawati

Government
  - Body: Village Panchayat

Area
  - Total: 19.9123 km^{2} (7.6882 sq mi)
- Elevation: 472 m (1,549 ft)

Population (2011)
  - Total: 3,020
  - Density: 152/km^{2} (393/sq mi)

Languages
  - Official: Kannada
- Time zone: UTC+5:30 (IST)
- Postal code: 583235
- ISO 3166 code: IN-KA
- Vehicle registration: KA
- Nearest city: Koppal
- Civic agency: Village Panchayat
- Website: karnataka.gov.in

Agoli is a village in the southern state of Karnataka, India. It is located in the Gangawati taluk of Koppal district in Karnataka.

== See also ==
- Koppal
- Districts of Karnataka
