= Akalkumpi, Koppal =

Akalkumpi
- village
- Akalkumpi, Gangawati is in Koppal district
- Country: India
- State: Karnataka
- District: Koppal
- Talukas: Gangawati

Government
  - Body: Village Panchayat

Languages
  - Official: Kannada
- Time zone: UTC+5:30 (IST)
- Nearest city: Koppal
- Civic agency: Village Panchayat

Akalkumpi, Gangawati is a village in the southern state of Karnataka, India. It is located in the Gangawati taluk of Koppal district in Karnataka.

== See also ==
- Koppal
- Districts of Karnataka
