= Indaragi =

Village in India

Indaragi Indargi
- Village
- Location within Karnataka Location within India
- Coordinates: 15°26′26″N 76°19′28″E
- Country: India
- State: Karnataka
- District: Koppal district
- Taluk: Koppal

Population (2011)
  - Total: 5,594

Languages
  - Official: Kannada
- Time zone: UTC+5:30 (IST)
- PIN: 583 228
- Telephone code: 08539
- Vehicle registration: KA-37

Indaragi (also spelled as Indargi) is a village in the Koppal taluk of Koppal district in the Indian state of Karnataka. Indaragi is 15 km from Koppal.

== Demographics ==
As of 2001 India census, Indaragi had a population of 4,738 with 2,422 males and 2,316 females and 734 Households.

== See also ==
- Hospet
- Munirabad
- Gangavathi
- Koppal
- Karnataka
