= Kukanapalli =

Village in India

Kukanapalli Kookanapalli
- Village
- Location within Karnataka Location within India
- Coordinates: 15°26′1.93″N 76°17′42.64″E
- Country: India
- State: Karnataka
- District: Koppal district
- Taluk: Koppal

Population (2001)
  - Total: 2,213

Languages
  - Official: Kannada
- Time zone: UTC+5:30 (IST)
- PIN: 583 228
- Telephone code: 08539
- Vehicle registration: KA 37

Kukanapalli, also spelled as Kookanapalli, is a village in the Koppal taluk of Koppal district in the Indian state of Karnataka. Kukanapalli is located Northeast to District Headquarters Koppal. Kukanapalli lies on Mangalore-Solapur National Highway.

== Demographics ==
As of 2001 India census, Kukanapalli had a population of 2,213 with 1,182 males and 1,031 females and 366 Households.

== See also ==
- Gangavathi
- Indaragi
- Kushtagi
- Hospet
- Koppal
