= Hanwal =

Village in India

- village
- Country: India
- State: Karnataka
- District: Koppal
- Talukas: koppal

Government
  - Body: Gram panchayat

Population (2001)
  - Total: 5,864

Languages
  - Official: Kannada
- Time zone: UTC+5:30 (IST)
- ISO 3166 code: IN-KA
- Vehicle registration: KA
- Website: karnataka.gov.in

Hanwal is a village in the southern state of Karnataka, India. It is located in the Koppal taluk of Koppal district in Karnataka.

== Demographics ==
As of 2001, the Indian census showed that Hanwal had a population of 5864 with 2903 males and 2961 females.

== See also ==
- Koppal
- Districts of Karnataka
