= Habalakatti =

Village in India

Habalakatti Habalkatti
- Village
- Location within Karnataka Location within India
- Coordinates: 15°49′9.79″N 75°56′32.22″E
- Country: India
- State: Karnataka
- District: Koppal district
- Taluk: Kushtagi

Population (2001)
  - Total: 1,817

Languages
  - Official: Kannada
- Time zone: UTC+5:30 (IST)
- Telephone code: 584116
- Vehicle registration: KA 36

Habalakatti is a village in the Kushtagi taluk of Koppal district in the Indian state of Karnataka.

== Demographics ==
As of 2001 India census, Habalakatti had a population of 1,817 with 914 males and 903 females and 297 Households.

== See also ==
- Gajendragad
- Ron
- Kushtagi
- Koppal
- Karnataka
