= Hanumasagara =

Village in India

Hanamsagar Hanumasagara
- Village
- Location within Karnataka Location within India
- Coordinates: 15°52′20″N 76°2′35″E
- Country: India
- State: Karnataka
- District: Koppal district
- Taluk: Kushtagi

Population (2001)
  - Total: 12,919

Languages
  - Official: Kannada
- Time zone: UTC+5:30 (IST)
- PIN: 583281
- Vehicle registration: KA-37

Hanamsagar, also spelled as Hanumasagara is a village in the Kushtagi taluk of Koppal district in Karnataka state, India.

== Demographics ==
As of the 2001 India census, Hanumasagara had a population of 12,919 with 6,556 males and 6,363 females. Agriculturally Hanamasagar is known for the production of pomegranate, sesamum and other oilseeds. Farmers here are well trained for hybrid seed production and hybrid vegetables and cotton are produced in this village. Hanumasagar connects three districts Koppal, Gadag and Bagalkot. Rich pink granite stone deposits are in and around, Hanumasagar, where quarrying for these stones is continues since 30 years. This village surroundings has rich sandstone deposits, which is commonly used for house building and some stone carving.

Hanumasagar has been identified as a location to generate power through wind energy. The village is surrounded by large stretches of hills on which Wind Power mills are erected. These wind fans are visible from a long distance. Hanumasagar has one of the oldest generation hand-loom weavers, the weavers weave famous Ilkal saree.

== History ==
The place has earned historical importance due to the presence of Venkateshwara Temple (Abhinava Tirupathi) at the hill top. It is believed that the god himself came here to please his devotee 'Sri Venkappayya Desai' based in a nearby village Yelabunchi. The Desai used to visit Tirupati annually and due to old age he could not visit Tirupati. Impressed by his devotion, Lord Venkatesh blessed in Desai's dream and promised to leave his footprint on the hanamasagar hill top. Similarly Lord Venkatesh came in Desai's dream again showing him the location of the idol which was being used as a washing stone in the Kushtagi lake.

Post the usual rituals a temple is built for the devotees to visit. Land was donated to every family involved in managing the temples day-to-day activities to ensure continuous service to Lard Vankateshwara. Land was donated to wood cutter, water suppliers, pujaris, cleaners, cooks, painters, etc; thus ensuring families get income and the service to Lord Venkateshwara is done without interruption. Devotees who cannot go to Tirupati, visit this place. Presently a Trust is created to manage the temple by the 7th generation of Sri Venkappayya Desai.

Hanamasagar is the location of the Shree Karisiddeshwara Temple which belongs to the Mysuru Samsthana matha, Sri Somashankara Lingeshwara Sukshetra and Bhavani temple managed by S.S.K Samaj Hanumasagara. The oldest Chandalingeshwar Temple at Beelagi Village is 4 km away from Hanamasagar where nameless tree and sunless well is situated. Kapaleshwar Jalapath (falls) is very near to Chandalingeshwar temple. The famous sand/statue slabs or transport to Maharashtra and surrounding areas.

Hanumasagara is also famous for the ancient Hanumasagar Fort located on the hill top which is constructed without mortar.

The closest tourism destination to Hanamsagar are Aihole, Pattadakal, Badami and Hampi.

Famous radio script writer Sri N P Kulkarni is from Hanamasagar, where he wrote nearly 40 comedy drama scripts to All India Radio.

== Transport ==
Hanumasagara is connected by road to Kushtagi. The nearest major airport is in Hubli.

=== Long-distance bus routes ===
From Kushtagi one can travel to Bangalore, Hubli, Hyderabad, Bagalkot and other major cities. Karnataka State Road Transport Corporation (KSRTC) runs a bus service to other cities and villages. There are also various private bus services.

=== Railways ===
Badami is the nearest railway station to Hanumasagara.

== See also ==
- Kushtagi
- Koppal
- Raichur
- Gajendragad
- Badami
- Ilkal
