= Sanapur =

Village in Karnataka, India

- village
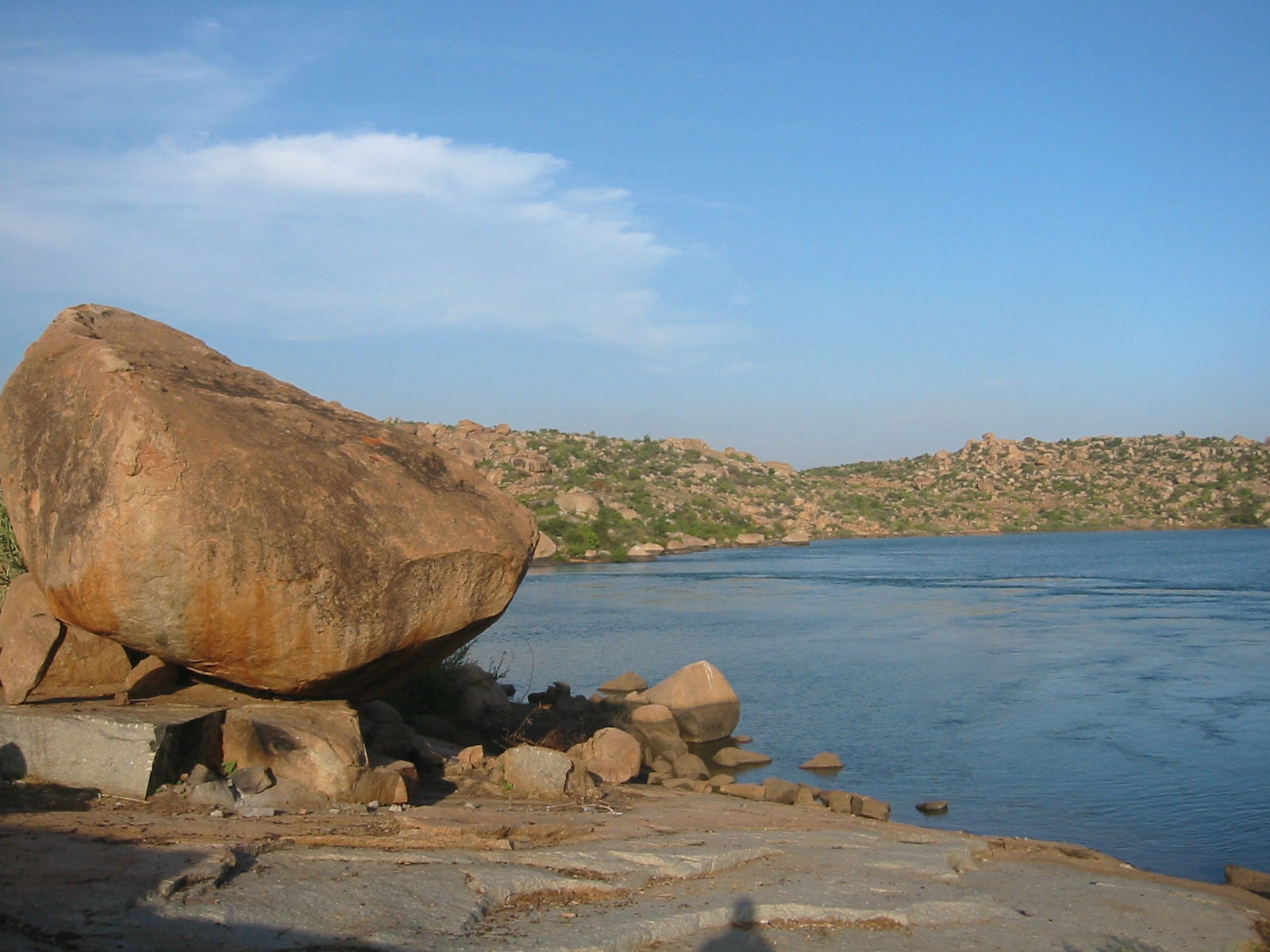
- Sanapur lake near the village
- Interactive map of Sanapur
- Coordinates: 15.350°N 76.434°E
- Country: India
- State: Karnataka
- Taluks: Kanakapura

Government
  - Type: Panchayati raj (India)
  - Body: Gram panchayat

Languages
  - Official: Kannada
- Time zone: UTC+5:30 (IST)
- ISO 3166 code: IN-KA
- Vehicle registration: KA
- Nearest city: Gangavathi
- Website: karnataka.gov.in

Sanapur is a village in Gangavathi taluk, Koppal district in Karnataka, India. It has a population of 1628 according to 2011 census. A lake in the village fed by Tungabhadra Dam canal is a tourist attraction. It is 3 km (1.9 mi) away from Virupapur Gaddi and 4 km (2.5 mi) away from Hampi.
