= Karnataka II solar power plant =

Power plant in Karnataka, India

Karnataka II
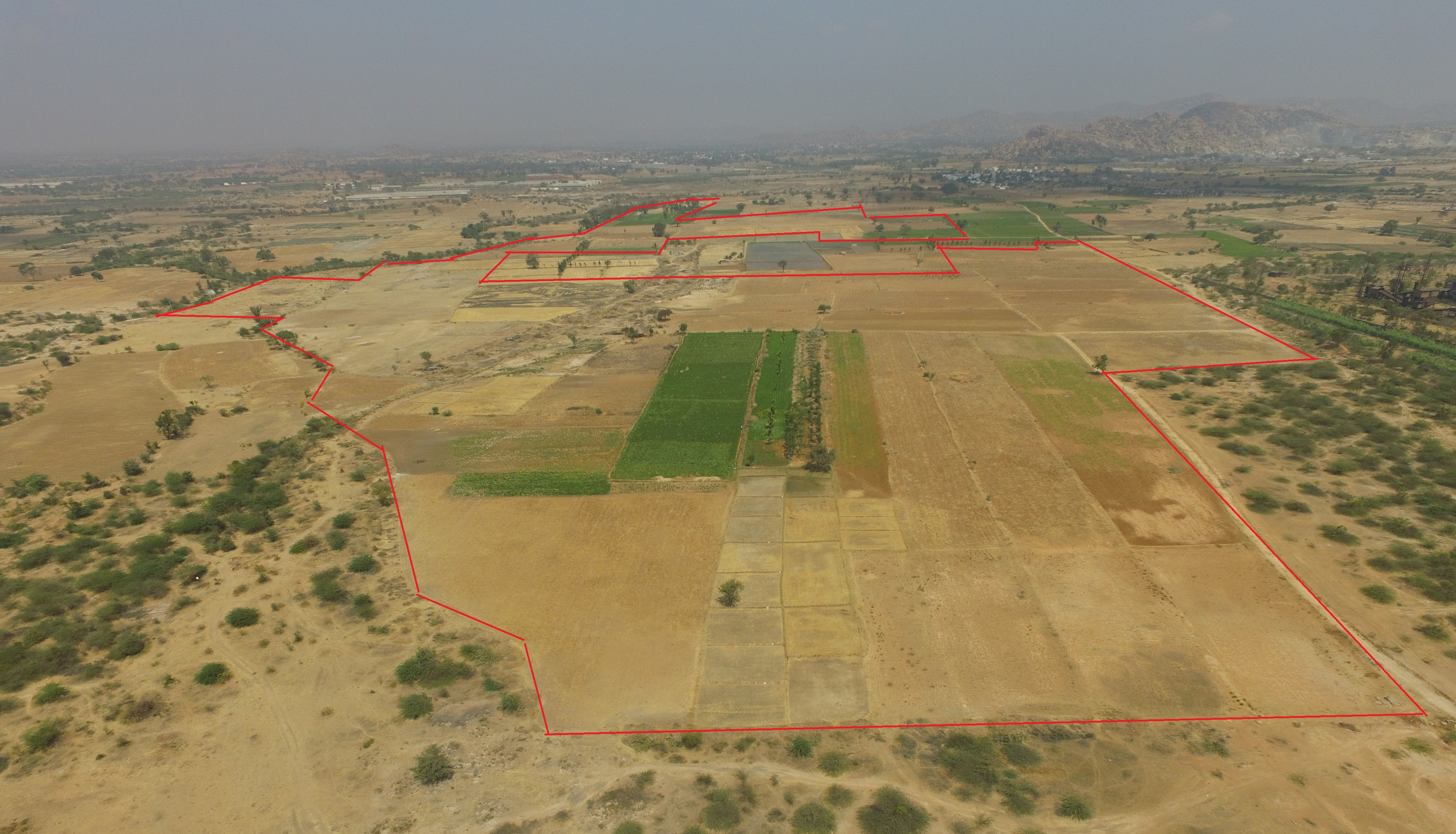
- Country: India
- Location: Koppal district, Karnataka
- Coordinates: 15°22′17″N 76°18′26″E
- Status: under construction
- Commission date: Q3 2019
- Owner: Talettutayi Solar Projects One Private Limited

Solar farm
- Type: Standard PV
- Collectors: 82,431
- Total collector area: 120 acres

Power generation
- Nameplate capacity: 27 MW_{AC}

External links
- Commons: Related media on Commons

Location of Power Plant Karnataka II in the State of Karnataka

Karnataka II solar park is a 27 megawatt (MW_{AC}) photovoltaic power station under construction. It is expected to achieve commercial operations during Q3 2019. The construction site is located in the south of Kerehalli Village in the Koppal District of the Indian state of Karnataka. It is about 60 km southeast to its sister project Karnataka I.

It covers 120 acres (49 hectares) and will supply about 42,000 people with energy. The solar panels are built in fixed tilt mounting structure, using polycrystalline solar PV technology. The solar park is named after the state of Karnataka and will be constructed from 82,431 solar modules, when operational. The estimated reduction of CO_{2} is more than 16,000 metric tons per year.

The owner is Solar Arise Limited, whose main shareholder is Thomas Lloyd Group. Co-investors at Solar Arise Limited are European Investment Bank (EIB) and Kotak Mahindra Group. The park is operated by Talettutayi Solar Projects One Private Limited. The solar power from the plant is taken by Solar Energy Corporation of India (SECI).

== Solar power in India ==
India targets developing 40 gigawatts of solar power plants and an additional 60 gigawatts in local generation by 2022.
