= Agalkera =

Agalkera Igalakera
- village
- Interactive map of Agalkera
- Coordinates: 15.3409°N 76.3292°E
- Country: India
- State: Karnataka
- District: Koppal
- Talukas: Koppal

Government
  - Body: Village Panchayat

Area
  - Total: 6.2938 km^{2} (2.4300 sq mi)

Population (2011)
  - Total: 4,895
  - Density: 777.7/km^{2} (2,014/sq mi)

Kannada and other Indian languages
  - Official: Kannada
- Time zone: UTC+5:30 (IST)
- PIN: 583234
- ISO 3166 code: IN-KA
- Vehicle registration: KA
- Region: Hyderabad Karnataka (371J)
- Lok Sabha constituency: Koppal
- Vidhan Sabha constituency: koppal
- Civic agency: Village Panchayat
- Website: karnataka.gov.in nammakpsc.com/wp/article-371j/

Agalkera is a village in the southern state of Karnataka, India. It is located in the Koppal taluk of Koppal district in Karnataka.

No. Of wards - 5

Area names- Hale ooru, Hosa ooru, PWD Camp, Shasthri nagara

== See also ==
- Koppal
- Districts of Karnataka
