= Chikkenakoppa =

- Village
- Location within Karnataka Location within India
- Coordinates: 15°29′32.94″N 75°54′4.76″E
- Country: India
- State: Karnataka
- District: Koppal district

Languages
  - Official: Kannada
- Time zone: UTC+5:30 (IST)
- PIN: 583232
- Telephone code: 08534
- Vehicle registration: KA-37

Chikkenakoppa is a village in the Yelburga taluk of Koppal district in the Indian state of Karnataka. Chikkenakoppa is 11 kilometres (6.8 mi) from Kuknoor.

== See also ==
- Lakkundi
- Itagi
