= Advibhavi (Gangawati) =

- village
- Interactive map of Advibhavi
- Coordinates: 15.8534°N 76.1374°E
- Country: India
- State: Karnataka
- District: Koppal
- Talukas: Gangawati

Government
  - Body: Village Panchayat

Languages
  - Official: Kannada
- Time zone: UTC+5:30 (IST)
- ISO 3166 code: IN-KA
- Vehicle registration: KA
- Nearest city: Koppal
- Civic agency: Village Panchayat
- Website: karnataka.gov.in

Advibhavi (Gangawati) is a village in the southern state of Karnataka, India. It is located in the Gangawati taluk of Koppal district in Karnataka.

== See also ==
- Koppal
- Districts of Karnataka
