= Adapura, Koppal =

Village in Karnataka, India

Adapura
- village
- Interactive map of Adapura
- Coordinates: 15.6335°N 76.5410°E
- Country: India
- State: Karnataka
- District: Koppal
- Talukas: Gangawati

Government
  - Body: Village Panchayat

Languages
  - Official: Kannada
- Time zone: UTC+5:30 (IST)
- Nearest city: Koppal
- Civic agency: Village Panchayat

Adapura (Kanakagiri) is a village in the Northern state of Karnataka, India. It is located in the Gangawati taluk of Koppal district in Karnataka.

The Word Adapura comes from the word Halapura (Flooding Milk). Natives are migrated from Bhogapura currently near to Sacred Bhogapureshwara Temple Near Navali, Taluk Gangavathi, Koppal District. Because of Flood, people migrated to many other places. One part of group reached to near Katagahalla (a stream), its looks like flowing milk (Halu in Kannada). People came from Bhogapura have resided south of Katagahalla called has Halapura (Flooding milk). when going on this Halapura has pronounced as Adapura.

The Village Adapura has a population of about 1400 (780 males and 620 females).

== See also ==
- Koppal
- Districts of Karnataka
