= Sri Ramanagara =

Sriram nagar Desaicamp
- Village
- Location in Karnataka, India Sriram nagar (India)
- Coordinates: 15.500°N 76.601°E
- Country: India
- State: Karnataka
- District: Koppal
- Taluk: Gangavathi

Government
  - Body: Gram Panchayath

Languages
  - Official: Kannada
- Time zone: UTC+5:30 (IST)
- Postal code: 583282
- Vehicle registration: KA 37

Sri Ramanagara is a village and Grama panchayat in Gangavathi taluk of Koppal district, Karnataka, India.
