= Allanagar =

Village in Karnataka, India

- village
- Interactive map of Allanagar
- Coordinates: 15.5581°N 76.2544°E
- Country: India
- State: Karnataka
- District: Koppal
- Talukas: Koppal

Government
  - Body: Village Panchayat

Languages
  - Official: Kannada
- Time zone: UTC+5:30 (IST)
- ISO 3166 code: IN-KA
- Vehicle registration: KA
- Nearest city: Koppal
- Civic agency: Village Panchayat
- Website: karnataka.gov.in

Allanagar is a village in the southern state of Karnataka, India. It is located in the Koppal taluk of Koppal district in Karnataka.

According to the 2011 Census, Allanagar has a total population of 1,212 people, with 627 males and 585 females. Allanagar consists of 257 households. The literacy rate in Allanagar stands at 67.34%, with male literacy at 75.05% and female literacy at 59.17%.

== See also ==
- Achartimmapur
- Districts of Karnataka
