= Adapura =

Adapura may refer to places in India:

- Adapura, Davanagere, a village in the southern state of Karnataka
- Adapura, Koppal, a village in the southern state of Karnataka
