= Kalaburagi division =

Coordinates: 17.3333°N 76.8333°E

Kalaburagi division Gulbarga division
- Division of Karnataka
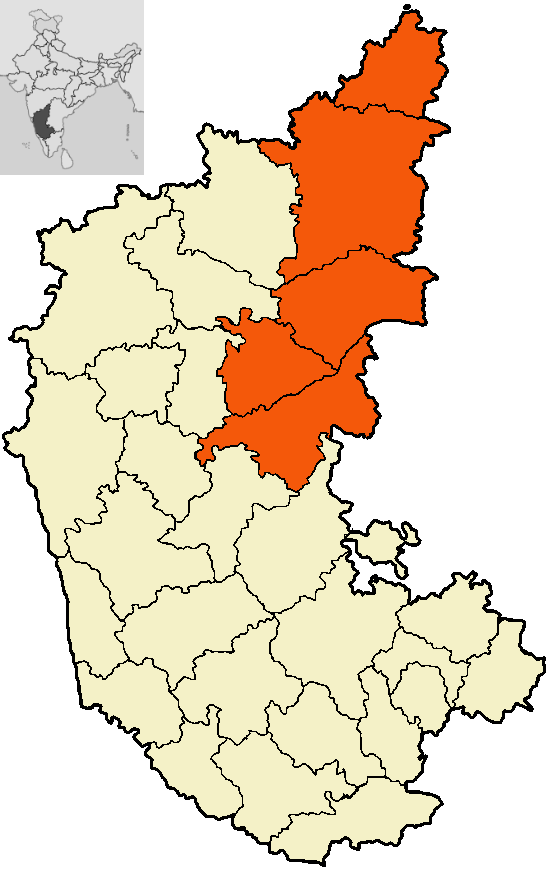
- saffron colour indicating districts of Kalaburagi division
- Country: India
- State: Karnataka
- Region: Hyderabad-Karnataka
- Districts: Bellary district; Bidar district; Kalaburagi district; Koppal district; Raichur district; Yadgir district; Vijayanagar District
- Headquarters: Kalaburagi

Government
  - Type: Divisional Administration
  - Body: Kalaburagi Divisional Administration
  - Divisional Commissioner: Subodh Yadav, IAS

Area
  - Total: 44,138 km^{2} (17,042 sq mi)

Population (2011)
  - Total: 11,215,224
  - Density: 254.09/km^{2} (658.10/sq mi)

Languages
  - Official: Kannada
- Time zone: UTC+5:30 (IST)
- ISO 3166 code: IN-KA
- Vehicle registration: KA

Kalaburagi division, formerly known as Gulbarga division, is one of the four divisions of the Indian state of Karnataka. It has seven districts, namely: Bellary district, Bidar district, Kalaburagi district, Koppal district, Raichur district, Yadgir district, and Vijayanagar district. It was the southwestern part of the former princely state of Hyderabad State. Kalaburagi is the headquarters of Kalaburagi division. The total area of the division is 44,138 km^{2}. The total population as of 2011 census is 11,215,224.

== See also ==
- Districts of Karnataka
