= Mellikeri =

Coordinates: 15°16′N 76°11′E

- Village
- Interactive map of Mellikeri
- Country: India
- State: Karnataka
- District: Koppal

Languages
  - Official: Kannada
- Time zone: UTC+5:30 (IST)

Mellikeri is a village in Belgaum district of Karnataka, India.

== About Mellikeri ==
According to Census 2011 information the location code or village code of Mellikeri village is 598157. Mellikeri village is located in Parasgad taluka of Belgaum district in Karnataka, India. It is situated 56km away from sub-district headquarter Parasgad (tehsildar office) and 80km away from district headquarter Belgaum. As per 2009 stats, Mugalihal is the gram panchayat of Mellikeri village.
