= Chalagera =

Village in Karnataka, India

Coordinates: 15.8232°N 76.0919°E

Chalagera (also Chalagere) is a village in Koppal district, Karnataka, India.
