= Bewoor =

- Village
- Location within Karnataka Location within India
- Coordinates: 15°33′57″N 76°10′44″E
- Country: India
- State: Karnataka
- District: Koppal district
- Taluk: Yelburga

Population (2001)
  - Total: 4,207

Languages
  - Official: Kannada
- Time zone: UTC+5:30 (IST)
- PIN: 583 237
- Telephone code: 08534
- Vehicle registration: KA-37

Bewoor is a village in the Yelburga taluk of Koppal district in the Indian state of Karnataka. Bewoor is 27 km from District Headquarters Koppal and lies on Koppal-Kushtagi road. Bewoor contributed many heroes for freedom fighter of India.

== Demographics ==
As of 2001 India census, Bewoor had a population of 4,207 with 2,170 males and 2,127 females and 722 Households.

== See also ==
- Hospet
- Munirabad
- Hampi
- Koppal
- Karnataka
