= Vithalapur =

Village in Karnataka, India

- Village
- Location in Karnataka, India Vithalapur (India)
- Coordinates: 15.008926°N 75.784759°E
- Country: India
- State: Karnataka
- District: Koppal

Languages
  - Official: Kannada
- Time zone: UTC+5:30 (IST)

Vithalapur is a village in Koppal district of Karnataka, India.
