= Pura, Kushtagi =

Village in India

Pura
- Village
- Location within Karnataka Location within India
- Coordinates: 15°42′42.47″N 76°27′55.52″E
- Country: India
- State: Karnataka
- District: Koppal district
- Taluk: Kushtagi

Population (2001)
  - Total: 1,050

Languages
  - Official: Kannada
- Time zone: UTC+5:30 (IST)
- PIN: 584131
- Vehicle registration: KA-37

Pura is a village in the Kushtagi taluk of Koppal district in Karnataka state, India. Pura is famous for the Somanatheshwara Temple which is also known as Kotilinga temple located in the village. Built during the Vijayanagara Empire this temple contains ancient edicts. Pura is 35 km from Kushtagi and 12 km from Tavaragara.

== Demographics ==
As of 2001 India census, Pura had a population of 1,050 with 523 males and 527 females and 875 households.

== See also ==
- Kushtagi
- Koppal
- Raichur
- Gajendragad
