= Navali, Gangavathi =

Village in India

Navali
- Village
- Location within Karnataka Location within India
- Coordinates: 15°39′4.22″N 76°32′30.91″E
- Country: India
- State: Karnataka
- District: Koppal district
- Taluk: Gangavathi

Population (2001)
  - Total: 4,885

Languages
  - Official: Kannada
- Time zone: UTC+5:30 (IST)
- PIN: 583219
- Telephone code: 08533
- Vehicle registration: KA 37

Navali is a village in the Gangavathi taluk of Koppal district in Karnataka state, India.Navali is famous for Bhogapuresha temple and Bandi Huchamma Devi temple. Navali is 17 km from Karatagi. And near to koti linga temple pura (kustagi taluk) Navali lies on Karatagi-Kanakagiri road and Kalmungi -Gangavati road (Adapur road) Which is known as RTP (Asia’s first Rice Technology Park) for paddy production of rice

== Demographics ==
As of 2001 India census, Navali had a population of 4,885 with 2,461 males and 2,424 females and 807 Households.

== See also ==
- Hampi
- Kanakagiri
- Koppal
- Gangavathi
- Anegundi
