= Benakal =

Benakal Benkal
- Village
- Location within Karnataka Location within India
- Coordinates: 15°26′26″N 76°2′42″E
- Country: India
- State: Karnataka
- District: Koppal district
- Taluk: Yelburga
- Lok Sabha Constituency: Koppal

Languages
  - Official: Kannada
- Time zone: UTC+5:30 (IST)
- Telephone code: 08534
- Vehicle registration: KA 37

Benakal is a village in the Yelburga taluk of Koppal district in the Indian state of Karnataka.

== See also ==
- Hospet
- Munirabad
- Hampi
- Koppal
- Karnataka
