= Karnataka I solar power plant =

Solar farm in Karnataka, India

Karnataka I
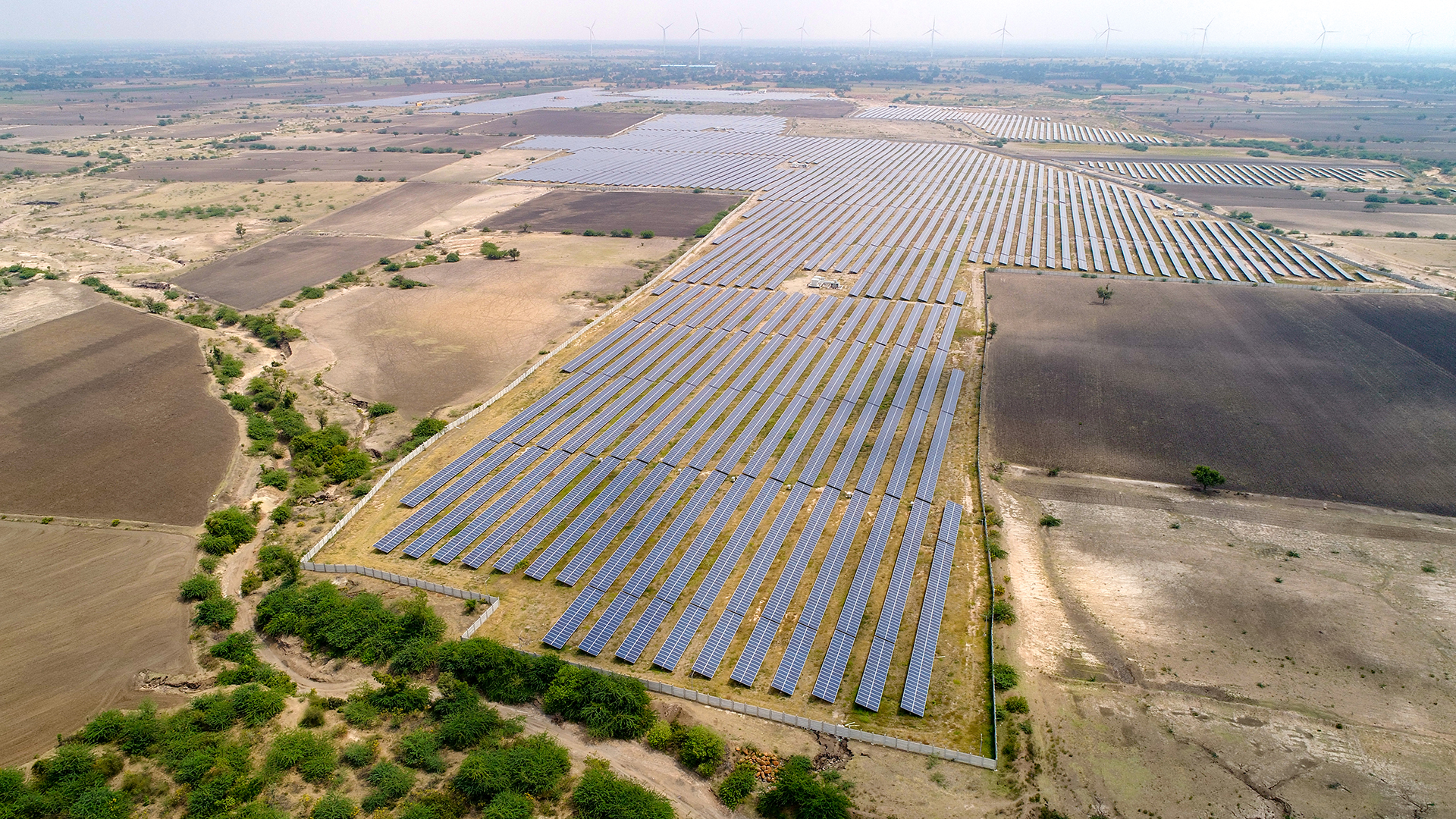
- Country: India
- Location: Koppal district, Karnataka
- Coordinates: 15°39′07″N 75°59′33″E
- Status: Operational
- Commission date: 5 January 2018; 7 years ago
- Owner: Talettutayi Solar Projects One Private Limited

Solar farm
- Type: Standard PV
- Collectors: 125,080
- Total collector area: 178 acres

Power generation
- Nameplate capacity: 40.5 MW_{DC}

External links
- Commons: Related media on Commons

Location of Power Plant Karnataka I in the State of Karnataka

Karnataka I solar park is a 40.5 megawatt (MW_{DC}) photovoltaic power station. It is located at Chikkoppa Village in the Koppal District of the Indian state of Karnataka. It was commissioned in January 2018. It covers 178 acres (72 hectares) and supplies about 72,000 people with energy. The solar park is operated by Talettutayi Solar Projects One Private Limited and was constructed using 125,080 solar modules. The solar power from the plant is taken by Solar Energy Corporation of India (SECI).

The developer is Solar Arise India Projects Limited, which the shareholders are Thomas Lloyd Group, the European Initiative on Clean, Renewable Energy, Energy Efficiency and Climate Change related to Development SICAV SIF in relation to Global Energy Efficiency and Renewable Energy Fund (“GEEREF”), advised by the European Investment Bank Group, Kotak Mahindra managed Core Infrastructure India Fund (“CIIF”) and the founding management team Anil Nayar, James Abraham and Tanya Singhal. SolarArise owns and operates 130 MW of grid-connected solar power projects in India.

== Solar power in India ==
India targets developing 40 gigawatts of solar power plants and an additional 60 gigawatts in local generation by 2022.
