= Kudgi =

- village
- Location in Karnataka, India Kudgi (India)
- Coordinates: 16.59°N 75.96°E
- Country: India
- State: Karnataka
- District: Bijapur
- Talukas: Basavana Bagevadi

Population (2001)
  - Total: 6,108

Languages
  - Official: Kannada
- Time zone: UTC+5:30 (IST)

Kudgi is a village in the southern state of Karnataka, India. It is located in the Basavana Bagevadi taluk of Bijapur district in Karnataka. NTPC has set up a power plant of 2400 MW capacity here(3×800MW in first stage).

== Demographics ==
As of 2001 India census, Kudgi had a population of 6108 with 3193 males and 2915 females.

== See also ==
- Bijapur district
- Districts of Karnataka
