= Anjeyanadri Hill =

Birth place of Hanuman

The Anjanādri Hill or Anjanādri Betta lies in Hanumanahalli near Hampi, Karnataka, India. It is believed to be the birthplace of the Hindu deity Hanuman. According to the Ramayana, Hanuman was born to Anjana and thus also called Anjaneya, and his birthplace is now known as Anjaneyadri (Anjana's Hill). It is located in Gangavathi taluk.

The hill has a Hanuman temple at the top. It has about 575 steps. The temple has a rock-carved idol of Lord Hanuman. There are also shrines of Rama and Sita and an Añjanā temple in the vicinity. This place was known as kishkinda in Puranas.

This hill is very near to Hampi where you can see the stone chariot, Hanuman temple, Yantra Hanuman temple, the place where Rama and Hanuman met for first time and many more. This place is famous for the beautiful landscapes.

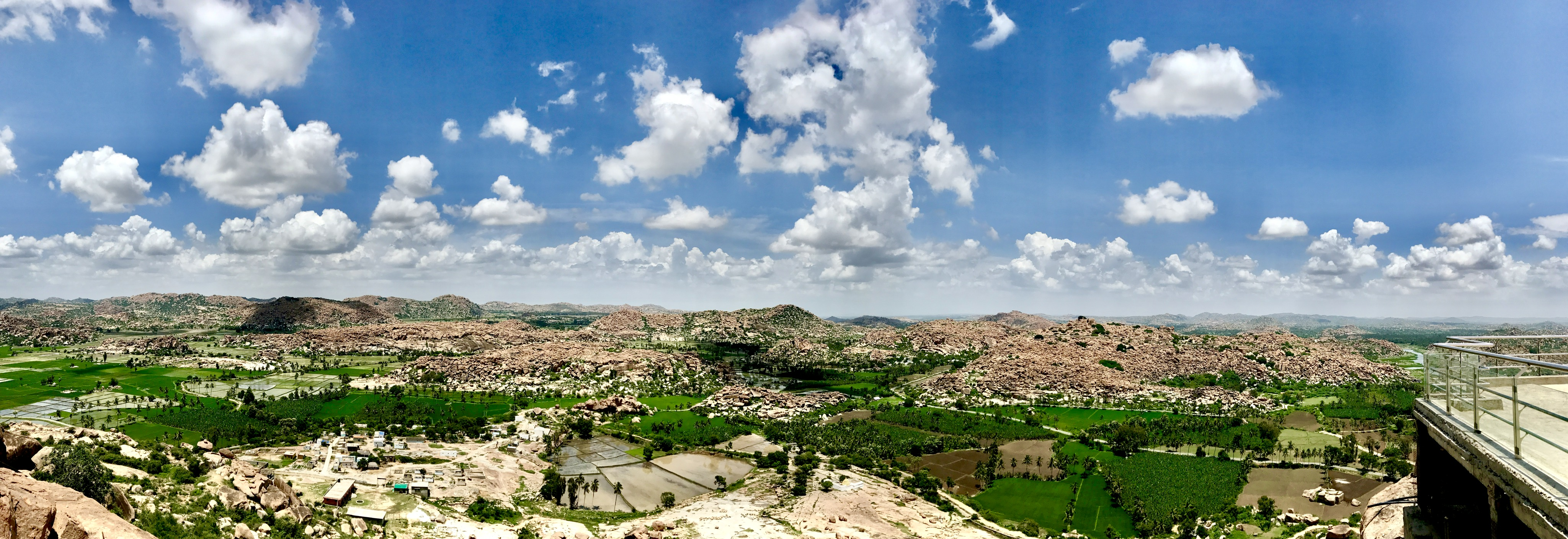
Hampi from Anjaneyadri Hill
