= Adapura, Davanagere =

Adapura
- village
- Interactive map of Adapura
- Coordinates: 14.3740°N 75.7879°E
- Country: India
- State: Karnataka
- District: Davanagere
- Talukas: Harihar

Government
  - Body: Village Panchayat

Languages
  - Official: Kannada
- Time zone: UTC+5:30 (IST)
- Nearest city: Davanagere
- Civic agency: Village Panchayat

Adapura (Harihar) is a village in the southern state of Karnataka, India. It is located in the Harihar taluk of Davanagere district.

== See also ==
- Davanagere
- Districts of Karnataka
