= Kalyana-Karnataka =

Division in Karnataka, India

Kalyana-Karnataka Hyderabad-Karnataka (1948–2019)
- Region
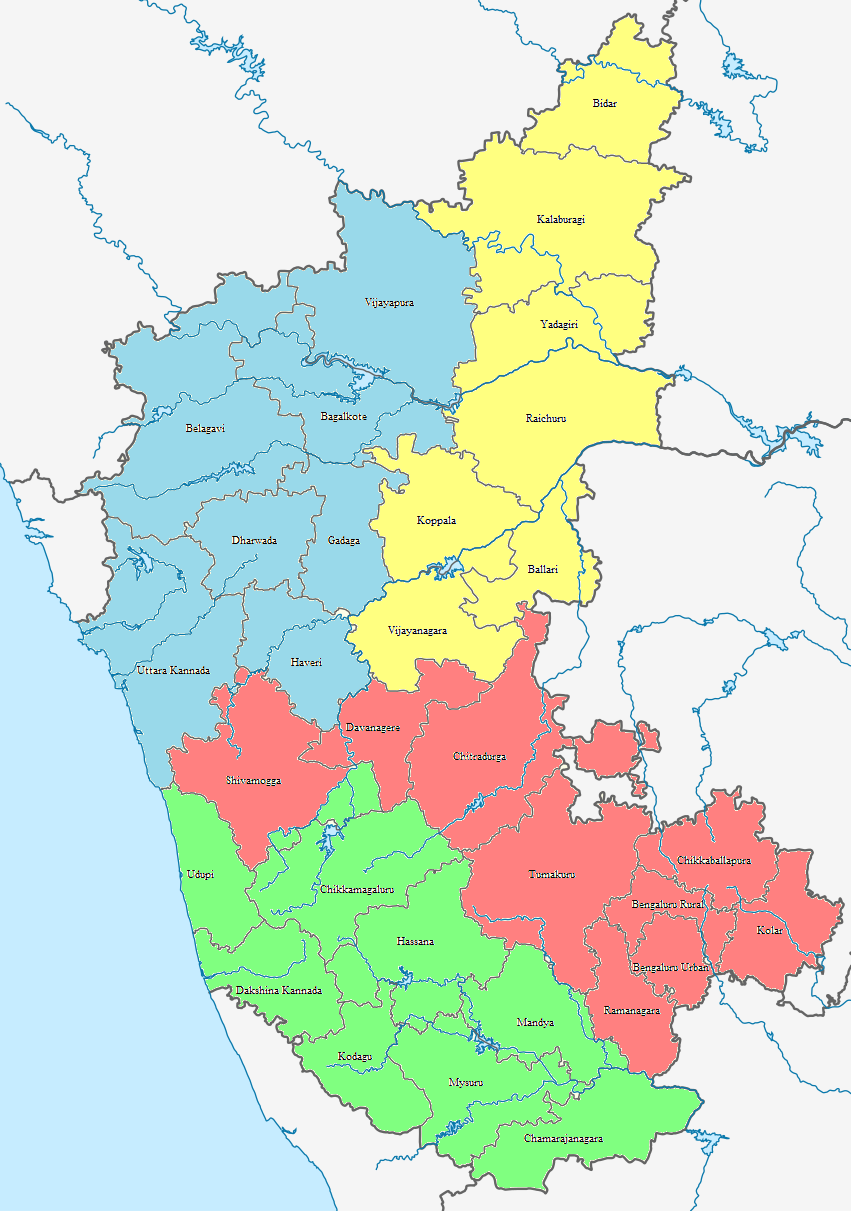
- Map of Karnataka with Kalyana-Karnataka region highlighted in yellow
- Country: India
- State: Karnataka
- Regions: South India; Deccan Plateau
- Districts: Bidar; Kalaburagi; Raichur; Yadgir; Ballari; Vijayanagara; Koppal
- Largest cities (areawise): Kalaburagi; Ballari
- Most Populated Cities: Bidar (Bidar district); Kalaburagi (Kalaburagi district); Raichur (Raichuru district); Yadgir (Yadagiri district); Ballari (Ballari district); Hosapete (Vijayanagara district); Koppal (Koppal district)
- Merger into India: 17 September 1948
- Became part of Mysore State (renamed Karnataka in 1973): 1 November 1956

Government
  - Type: Regional Administration
  - Body: Kalyana-Karnataka Region Development Board (KKRDB), Hyderabad Karnataka Region Development Board
  - Divisional Commissioner: N. V. Prasad, IAS
  - President of the Kalyana-Karnataka Development Board: Ajay Singh

Area
  - Total: 44,138 km^{2} (17,042 sq mi)

Population (2011)
  - Total: 11,286,343
  - Density: 255.71/km^{2} (662.28/sq mi)

Languages
  - Official: Kannada
  - Minority: Deccan Urdu, Telugu, Marathi
- Time zone: UTC+5:30 (IST)
- ISO 3166 code: IN-KA
- Vehicle registration: KA
- Website: www.hkrdb.kar.nic.in

Kalyana-Karnataka, formerly known as Hyderabad-Karnataka or Gulbarga Division, is a region located in the northeastern part of Karnataka that was historically split between the Nizam-ruled Hyderabad State and the Madras Presidency of British India. The region comprises Bidar, Yadgir, Raichur, Koppal and Kalaburagi districts from former Hyderabad state, along with the Ballari and Vijayanagara districts from the former Madras Presidency. The region is the second-largest arid region in India. Kalaburagi and Ballari are the largest cities in this region.

Following the integration of Hyderabad State into India in 1948, these districts were incorporated into the state of Karnataka (then Mysore State) under the States Reorganization Act of 1956.

In 2019, the Hyderabad-Karnataka region was officially renamed Kalyana-Karnataka.

== See also ==
- Mysore (region)
- North Karnataka
- Nizam of Hyderabad
- Basavakalyana
