= Tavaragera =

Tavaragera Tavaragere
- town
- Nickname: TVG
- Location within Karnataka Location within India
- Coordinates: 15°43′33″N 76°32′35″E
- India: India
- karanataka: Karnataka
- koppal: Koppal district
- kushtagi: Kushtagi

Languages
  - Official: Kannada
- Time zone: UTC+5:30 (IST)
- PIN: 583279
- Vehicle registration: KA 37

Tavaragera is located in the northeast part of Koppal district, Karnataka, India. It is 24 km away from Kushtagi taluk and 90 km away from Koppal. It is famous for its rayana Kere(pond or lake) built by vijayanagara kings in 15th CE that is why the name taware(lotus) kere(pond)= tawargere derived.

Many kings ruled this town Namely nizams, vijayanagara kings and so on.

== See also ==
- Koppal
- Kushtagi
