= Administrative divisions of Karnataka =

Regional divisions in Karnataka

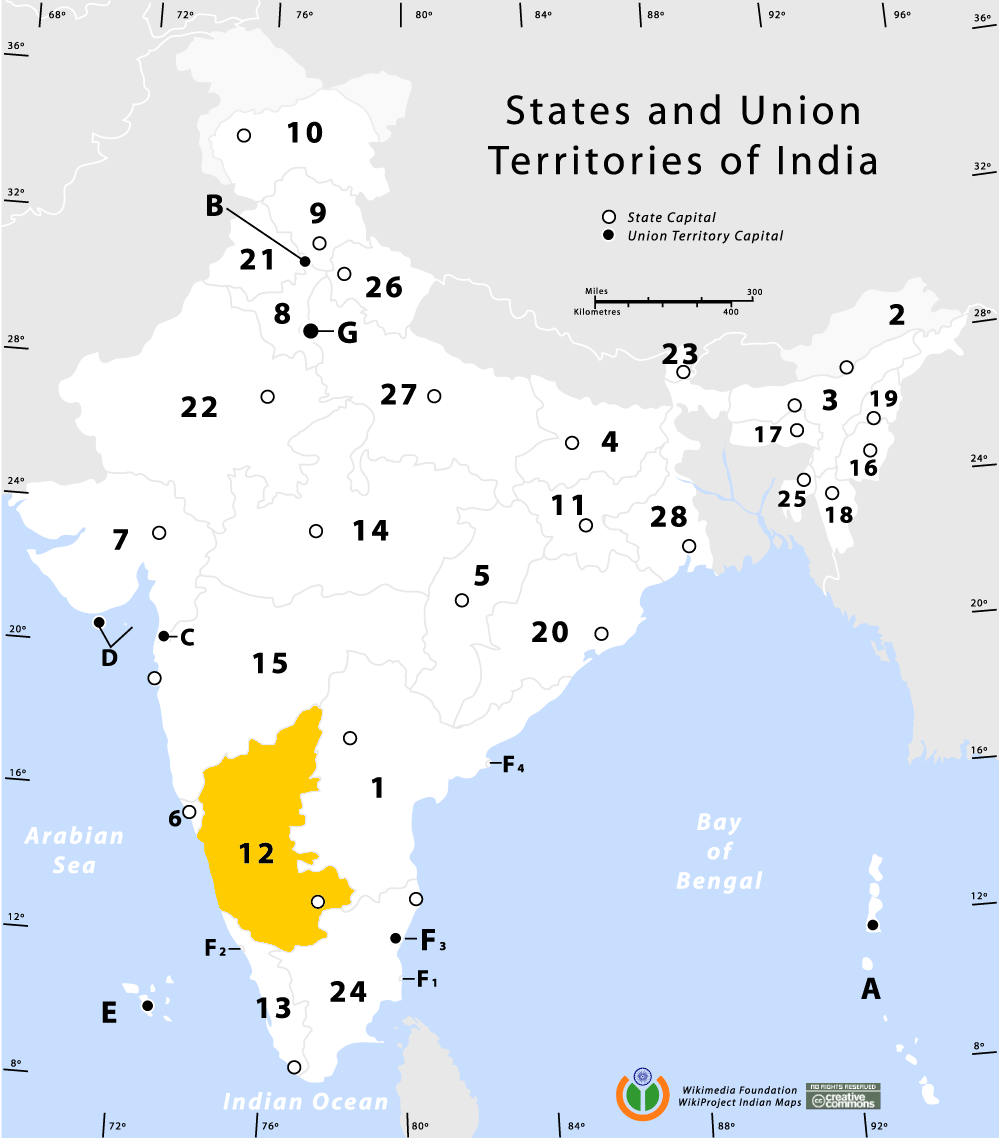
Karnataka Highlighted

Karnataka a state in southern India was formed on 1 November 1956. The state is divided into 4 divisions.

- Bengaluru
- Belagavi
- Kalaburagi
- Mysuru

== References and Additional Resources ==
- Karnataka Website
