= Itagi (disambiguation) =

Itagi may refer to:

- Itagi, Bahia, a municipality in North-Eastern Brazil
- Itagi, Gadag, a village in Karnataka, India
- Itagi, Koppal, a village in Karnataka, India
- Madhuri Itagi, a Kannada actress and reality television personality
