= Yelburga =

Yelburga Yalaburga
- Town
- Location in Karnataka, India
- Coordinates: 15.613794°N 76.012359°E
- Country: India
- State: Karnataka
- District: Koppal

Government
  - Body: Town Panchayath

Area
  - Town: 7 km^{2} (2.7 sq mi)
  - Rural: 1,489 km^{2} (575 sq mi)
- Elevation: 620 m (2,030 ft)

Population (2011)
  - Town: 14,814
  - Density: 2,100/km^{2} (5,500/sq mi)
  - Rural: 252,628

Languages
  - Official: Kannada
- Time zone: UTC+5:30 (IST)
- PIN: 583236
- Telephone code: 08534
- Vehicle registration: KA-37
- Website: www.yelburgatown.gov.in

Yalaburga also called Yelburga is a panchayat town in Koppal district in the Indian state of Karnataka.

== Geography ==
Yelburga is located at 15.63°N 76.02°E.

== History ==
Yelburga was ruled by Yelambarga dynasty during the dawn of the 11th century. An edict obtained explains about Yelburga from AD 1026 to AD 1126.

== Demographics ==
As of 2001 India census, Yelburga had a population of 11,437. Males constitute 51% of the population and females 49%. Yelburga has an average literacy rate of 58%, lower than the national average of 59.5%: male literacy is 69%, and female literacy is 47%. In Yelburga, 15% of the population is under 6 years of age.

== Temples ==
- Timmappana temple

Built in the 17th century AD by a local leader named Timmappa, this is an underground temple to Aanjaneya (Hanuman). A marvelous architectural monument, it also has a Kalyani (well) built in front of the Hanuman deity. This temple is situated adjacent to Koppal Road on the southern side of the Taluqa Headquarters. Timmappa also planted many Tamarind trees and these have now become huge. One can see many of them today around the temple, which area is therefore known as Timmappana Topu (Timmappa's tree plantation). There are Nadugannada (medieval Kannada) scripts engraved on the pillars, detailing the events of the time. On Ugadi Day, a Car Festival is celebrated by the people of the town. A Huchhayya (a type of Festival Car) built on a bullock cart is used in this festival. This historical place needs to be promoted by both local administration and government authorities.

- Mahadeva Temple, Itagi
- Maruteshwara Temple is in Guttur on the Yalaburga - Bevoor Road, 18 km away.
- Trilingabasaweshwar temple in Mudhol, was built in the 11th century.
- Marutheshwara temple famous temple is in Chikkavankalakunta 25 km away in NH 13 and was constructed by vyasamaharshi,
- Anjaneya temple Rudrabhavi, another one Kondada bhavi and kempukere nearly historical mantapa.

== See also ==
- Chikkenakoppa
- Gadag
- Gajendragad
- Karnataka
- Koppal
- Kudalasangama
- Kuknur
- Kushtagi
- Lakkundi
