= Kushtagi =

Human settlement in Koppal district, Gulbarga Division, Karnataka, India

- Town
- Kushtagi
- Location in Karnataka, India Kushtagi (India)
- Coordinates: 15.751493°N 76.192903°E
- Country: India
- State: Karnataka
- District: Koppala

Government
  - Body: Town Municipal Council

Area
  - Town: 15 km^{2} (5.8 sq mi)
  - Rural: 1,355 km^{2} (523 sq mi)
- Elevation: 670 m (2,200 ft)

Population (2011)
  - Town: 24,878
  - Density: 1,700/km^{2} (4,300/sq mi)
  - Rural: 259,914

Languages
  - Official: Kannada
- Time zone: UTC+5:30 (IST)
- PIN: 583278
- Vehicle registration: KA-37
- Website: www.kustagitown.mrc.gov.in

Kushtagi is a municipality in Koppal district in the Indian state of Karnataka. Kushtagi is a taluk center of Koppal district. This taluk has a population of 353,142 as per the 2021 census estimate. In this taluk, pomegranate fruits are popularly grown.There is a Durga devi temple in heart of the town. To its North lies Ilkal, Gajendragad to the West, Hospet to the South and Sindhanur to the East. Red and black soil can be found in this taluk. A big lake 4km away from the city is the main source of drinking water is situated in west side and covering the area of more than 300 acres.

== History ==
Kushtagi is located at 15.77°N 76.2°E.

== Demographics ==
As of 2001 India census,

== Registered Non-Government Organisations ==
Kushtagi is a major area of work for the following NGOs:

- Samraksha, the HIV/AIDS unit of Samuha
- Information Technology, Sankalpa Rural information Technology Development

== Transport ==
Kushtagi is well connected by road to Bangalore, Hubli, Raichur, Bagalkot and other major cities. The nearest major airport is in Hubli.

=== Long-distance bus routes ===
Karnataka State Road Transport Corporation (KSRTC) runs a bus service to other cities and villages. There are also various private bus services.

The new 56-km stretch, part of the broader Gadag–Wadi rail project, connects several towns and villages, including Linganabandi, Hanumapur, Yelburga, Sanganal, Kukanoor, and Talakal.

The event also witnessed the flagging off of the first passenger train from Kushtagi to Hubballi, a service that is expected to benefit thousands of daily commuters and traders. The daily passenger train will start at 6.45 a.m. from Kushtagi and reach Hubballi at 10.45 a.m. It leaves Hubballi at 5 p.m. Addressing the gathering, Mr. Somanna lauded Karnataka Chief Minister Siddaramaiah for providing funds for land acquisition for the project. He expressed appreciation for the efforts of Chief Minister’s Economic Advisor Basavaraj Rayareddy in pushing the project forward and hailed Prime Minister Narendra Modi for focusing on expansion of the railway network.

“Prime Minister Modi has revived and implemented several railway projects that were originally proposed during the previous UPA regime, with an investment of ₹7 lakh crore. Robust rail connectivity is essential for driving national development, and this can only be achieved when the Union and State governments function in close coordination, like two sides of the same coin. Since the BJP came to power, we have taken decisive steps towards achieving full railway electrification by 2025. Backed by a national railway budget of ₹2.65 lakh crore, our government has prioritised the completion of long-pending infrastructure projects, unlike the UPA era when funding for railway station development was largely neglected,” the Minister said.The government was introducing the advanced Kavach safety system in Vande Bharat Express trains. “From 2014 to 2024, we have created five lakh employment opportunities in the railways. After I took charge, we made it possible for candidates to write recruitment exams in Kannada. Additionally, 10,000 new engines are being inducted into the railway system to modernise operations,” he said.

Mr. Somanna stated that while the Central Government allocated ₹549 crore in the current financial year for the Gadag–Wadi railway line, ₹837 crore is pending from the government of Karnataka. He called on local leaders, including Basavaraj Rayareddy, to ensure the State’s contribution is released promptly.

“For road overbridges and underpasses, the Centre is generously contributing 100% of the cost, although the norm is 50:50 funding between Centre and State,” he added.

== See also ==
- Hanumasagara
- Kudalasangama
- Sindhanur
- Yelburga
