= Gangavati, Karnataka =

Gangavathi ಭತ್ತದ ನಾಡು
- City
- Location in Karnataka, India
- Coordinates: 15.43°N 76.53°E
- Country: India
- State: Karnataka
- District: Koppal

Area
  - Total: 16.53 km^{2} (6.38 sq mi)

Population (2024)
  - Total: 150,563
  - Density: 8,641.2/km^{2} (22,381/sq mi)

Languages
  - Official: Kannada
- PIN: 583 227
- Telephone: 08533
- ISO 3166 code: IN-KA
- Vehicle registration: KA-37
- Website: www.gangavathicity.mrc.gov.in

Gangāvathi is a city, municipality and taluk in the Koppal district of the Indian state of Karnataka. It is one of the main commercial hubs in the Kalyana-Karnataka region. It is also the largest city, in terms of area and population, in the Koppal district. The city’s Aaradhya dhaiva is ‘Shree Channabasava Swamy Thatha’ who is worshipped by one and all across all the communities.

The celebrated Anjanadri Hills, believed to be the birth place of Lord Hanuman is situated in the administrative area of the Gangavathi Taluk, the Pampa Sarovara, Anegundi, Chikkabenakal caves, Sangapur lake and many other places which have a historical connection with Ramayana can be found within the administrative area of this taluk as well.

Gangavathi city has close to 1.6 lakh population and the taluk close to 3 lakhs (this after Kanakagiri and Karatagi got separated, otherwise the number stood at 6lakhs), the city also serves as sub district for judiciary and administration

Given the potential, a new district ‘Kishkinda’ is being proposed with Gangavathi being designated as its district headquarters which would potentially include the taluks Kanakagiri, Karatagi, Kampli, Tavaragera and Sindhanur. This would help the people from surrounding areas drastically reduce their travel time to their districts currently and also will help the city’s growth in future to potentially host the Kishkinda tourism for better.

== Geography ==
Gangavathi lies at an average elevation of 406 metres (1,332 ft), and is situated close to the Tungabhadra Dam. It is a taluka (administrative division) of Koppal, a district that was previously part of Raichur.

Within Gangavathi Taluk are thirty-eight gram panchayats, or self-governing villages.

== Economy ==
Gangavathi is a commercial center and a major focal point for the Rice Milling industry, with its rural areas being important for Paddy cultivation. Gangavathi has Asia's first Rice Technology Park.

== Transport ==
Gangavati is well connected by road.

=== Rail ===
Gangavati has a railway station (Gangavathi railway station) and is located on the Mahabubnagar-Munirabad railway line.

== Demographics ==
According to the 2011 India census, Gangavathi had a population of 1,05,529. Males constituted 51% of the population and females 49%. Gangavathi had an average literacy rate of 57%, lower than the national average of 59.5%: male literacy was 67%, and female literacy 48%. In Gangavathi 15% of the population is under 6 years of age.

== Landmarks ==
Notable places of historic importance near Gangavathi are Hampi, a UNESCO World Heritage Site 14 kilometres (8.7 mi) south-west of the town, which includes the Virupaksha Temple, the villages of Kanakagiri and Anegundi, and gurus' tombs at Nava Brindavana. The village of Hemagudda is 12 kilometres (7.5 mi) away – it is the site of the 14th-century safe-haven Hemagudda Fort, and Dasara celebrations within a restored temple.

== See also ==
- Hampi
- Anjanadri hill, Gangavathi
