= Koppal =

- City
- Koppala
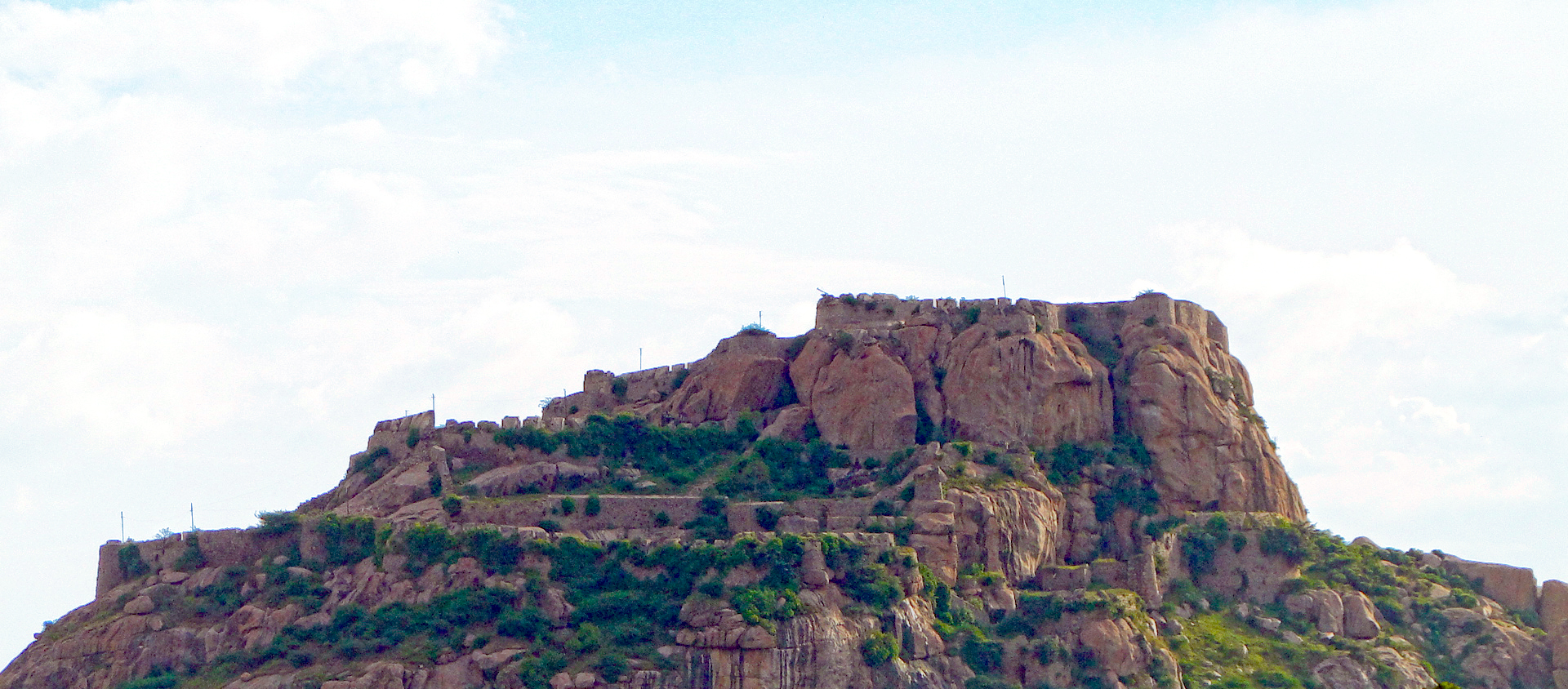
- Koppal Fort
- Interactive map of Koppal
- Coordinates: 15.35°N 76.15°E
- Country: India
- State: Karnataka
- District: Koppal

Government
  - Type: City Municipality

Area
  - Total: 28.78 km^{2} (11.11 sq mi)
- Elevation: 529 m (1,736 ft)

Population (2011)
  - Total: 70,698
  - Density: 2,070.62/km^{2} (5,362.9/sq mi)
- Time zone: UTC+5:30 (IST)
- PIN: 583 231
- Telephone code: 08539
- Vehicle registration: KA-37
- Official language: Kannada
- Website: www.koppalcity.mrc.gov.in

Koppal or Koppala is the district headquarters of Koppal district in the Indian state of Karnataka. Koppal is surrounded on three sides by hills. It was known as Kopana Nagara. The town has historical landmarks such as the Koppal Fort, Gavimath (a religious shrine), and the Male Mallappa Temple. Historically, Koppal was known as Jaina Kashi, meaning the "Kashi" or most-sacred-place for Jains. It was so named because there were more than 700 Basadis (also called Bastis), Jain meditation halls or Prarthana Mandirs. Koppal district was carved out of Raichur district, located in the northern part of Karnataka state, on 1 April 1998. Major tourist attractions include the Krishnadevaraya Tomb, Anjanadri Parvata, Huligamma Temple, Pampa Sarovara, among others.

== Climate ==
Climate data for Koppal (1991–2020)
Month	Jan	Feb	Mar	Apr	May	Jun	Jul	Aug	Sep	Oct	Nov	Dec	Year
Record high °C (°F)	34.5 (94.1)	39.0 (102.2)	40.5 (104.9)	42.6 (108.7)	42.5 (108.5)	39.5 (103.1)	36.0 (96.8)	35.2 (95.4)	35.5 (95.9)	35.0 (95.0)	33.5 (92.3)	35.0 (95.0)	42.6 (108.7)
Mean daily maximum °C (°F)	30.0 (86.0)	32.9 (91.2)	36.3 (97.3)	38.2 (100.8)	37.6 (99.7)	32.8 (91.0)	30.4 (86.7)	30.3 (86.5)	30.0 (86.0)	30.4 (86.7)	29.1 (84.4)	29.1 (84.4)	32.2 (90.0)
Mean daily minimum °C (°F)	16.5 (61.7)	18.5 (65.3)	21.7 (71.1)	23.8 (74.8)	23.9 (75.0)	22.8 (73.0)	22.3 (72.1)	21.8 (71.2)	21.5 (70.7)	20.9 (69.6)	18.6 (65.5)	16.6 (61.9)	20.7 (69.3)
Record low °C (°F)	10.0 (50.0)	10.5 (50.9)	15.0 (59.0)	18.0 (64.4)	19.0 (66.2)	11.0 (51.8)	20.0 (68.0)	20.0 (68.0)	18.5 (65.3)	14.5 (58.1)	10.0 (50.0)	9.5 (49.1)	9.5 (49.1)
Average rainfall mm (inches)	1.9 (0.07)	2.3 (0.09)	26.8 (1.06)	20.1 (0.79)	66.9 (2.63)	85.7 (3.37)	87.9 (3.46)	114.1 (4.49)	150.7 (5.93)	96.4 (3.80)	26.5 (1.04)	2.0 (0.08)	681.1 (26.81)
Average rainy days	0.1	0.1	0.8	1.9	4.0	5.3	6.2	7.2	7.1	5.1	1.4	0.2	39.4
Average relative humidity (%) (at 17:30 IST)	48	43	37	40	45	68	75	76	74	70	63	56	57
Source: India Meteorological Department

== Demographics ==
As per the 2011 census, Koppal district had a population of 70,698. This gives it a ranking of 350th in India (out of a total of 640). The district has a population density of 250 inhabitants per square kilometre (650/sq mi). Its population growth rate over the decade 2001-2011 was 16.32%. Koppal has a sex ratio of 1006 females for every 1000 males and a literacy rate of 79.97%.

== Transport ==
Koppal has a railway station, which is located north-west from the city centre, connecting to Delhi,Bengaluru, Hubli, Hyderabad, Tirupati, and Kolhapur.

== Villages ==
- Rajoor
- Bhatapanahalli
- Gangavathi
- Habalakatti
- Kanakagiri
- Kesakkihanchinal
- Kinhal
- Kuknur
- Kushtagi
- Mandalagiri
- Tavaragera
- Yelburga
- Hanawal
