= Venkatapura, Lingasugur =

Venkatapura
- Village
- Location within Karnataka Location within India
- Coordinates: 15°59′6.95″N 76°37′19.43″E
- Country: India
- State: Karnataka
- District: Raichur district
- Taluk: Lingasugur

Languages
  - Official: Kannada
- Time zone: UTC+5:30 (IST)
- Telephone code: 08537
- Vehicle registration: KA-36

Venkatapura is a village near Maski in the Lingasugur taluk of Raichur district in the Indian state of Karnataka. Venkatapura is a Neolithic period site. 45 Cairns were found in the hills south to the village. Some of these cairns are 50 meters in diameter. Some are found in rings and pairs. Venkatapura is 5 km from Maski town.

== See also ==
- Maski
- Hatti
- Mudgal
- Jaladurga
- Raichur
- Districts of Karnataka
