= Mudval =

Mudval Mudwal
- Village
- Location within Karnataka Location within India
- Coordinates: 16°1′5.75″N 76°37′50.17″E
- Country: India
- State: Karnataka
- District: Raichur district
- Taluk: Lingasugur

Languages
  - Official: Kannada
- Time zone: UTC+5:30 (IST)
- Telephone code: 08537
- Vehicle registration: KA-36

Mudval also spelled as Mudwal is a village near Maski in the Lingasugur taluk of Raichur district in the Indian state of Karnataka. Mudwal is a pre-historic period site. There is a stone village in the village of historical importance. Gold crushers and Iron slags were found in the hill near to the Mudval village.

== See also ==
- Hatti
- Mudgal
- Jaladurga
- Districts of Karnataka
