= Googal, Devadurga =

Googal Google
- Village
- Location within Karnataka Location within India
- Coordinates: 16°28′30″N 77°8′39″E
- Country: India
- State: Karnataka
- District: Raichur district
- Taluk: Devadurga

Languages
  - Official: Kannada
- Time zone: UTC+5:30 (IST)
- PIN: no code
- no code: KA 36
- Vehicle registration: KA 36

Googal, sometimes spelled as Google, is a village in the Devadurga taluk of Karnataka, India.

Googal is located on the banks of the Krishna River; it is famous for its cave temple dedicated to Allama Prabhu. According to legend, its name is derived from kooguva kallu, which is Kannada for lithophonic rocks. The village is in the northwest octrant of the Raichur district, and is 50 km from Raichur, the district capital.

== See also ==
- Shorapur
- Maski
- Raichur
- Hatti
- Madagiri
