= Piklihal =

Piklihal Piklihala
- Village
- Location within Karnataka Location within India
- Coordinates: 15°57′51.81″N 76°26′58.28″E
- Country: India
- State: Karnataka
- District: Raichur district
- Taluk: Lingasugur

Languages
  - Official: Kannada
- Time zone: UTC+5:30 (IST)
- Telephone code: 08537
- Vehicle registration: KA-36

Piklihal is a village near Mudgal in the Lingasugur taluk of Raichur district in Karnataka state, India. Piklihal is a Neolithic period site. The site was excavated by F. Raymond Allchin in 1952. Piklihal is 6 km south to Mudgal town. The Neolithic settlers in piklihal were cattle herders; they domesticated cattle, sheep, goats etc. They set up seasonal camps surrounded by cowpens made with posts stakes. Recent study has detailed on cultural assemble in multiple locations of the site Piklihal.

== See also ==
- Maski
- Hatti
- Mudgal
- Tekkalakote
- Jaladurga
- Raichur
- Districts of Karnataka
