= Adapur, Karnataka =

Adapur
- village
- Location in Karnataka, India Adapur (India)
- Coordinates: 15°57′N 76°20′E
- Country: India
- State: Karnataka
- District: Raichur
- Talukas: Lingsugur

Government
  - Body: Village Panchayat

Languages
  - Official: Kannada
- Time zone: UTC+5:30 (IST)
- Nearest city: Raichur
- Civic agency: Village Panchayat

Adapur is a village in the southern state of Karnataka, India. It is located in the Lingsugur taluk of Raichur district in Karnataka.

== See also ==
- Raichur
- Districts of Karnataka
