= Ballatgi =

Ballatgi Ballatagi
- Villege
- Location within Karnataka Location within India
- Coordinates: 16°6′41.19″N 76°56′55.18″E
- Country: India
- State: Karnataka
- District: Raichur district
- Taluk: sirwara

Languages
  - Official: Kannada
- Time zone: UTC+5:30 (IST)
- PIN: 584129
- Telephone code: 08538
- Vehicle registration: KA 36
- ballavaru Ulla uro Ballatigi

Ballatgi also spelled Ballatagi is a village in the Manvi taluk of Raichur district in the Indian state of Karnataka. It is located in the southwest district headquarters of Raichur town. Paddy crop is the chief export.

== Demographics ==
As of 2001 India census, Ballatgi had a population of 6096 with 3116 males and 2980 females.

== See also ==
- Mantralayam
- Manvi
- Lingasugur
- Sindhanur
- Raichur
