= Aidbhavi =

- village
- Aidbhavi is in Raichur district
- Interactive map of Aidbhavi
- Coordinates: 16.3084°N 76.5777°E
- Country: India
- State: Karnataka
- District: Raichur
- Talukas: Lingsugur

Government
  - Body: Village Panchayat

Languages
  - Official: Kannada
- Time zone: UTC+5:30 (IST)
- Vehicle registration: KA
- Nearest city: Raichur
- Civic agency: Village Panchayat
- Website: karnataka.gov.in

Aidbhavi is a village in the southern state of Karnataka, India. It is located in the Lingsugur taluk of Raichur district in Karnataka.

== See also ==
- Raichur
- Districts of Karnataka
