= Sajjalagudda =

Sajjalagudda Guragunta
- Village
- Location within Karnataka Location within India
- Coordinates: 16°4′39.85″N 76°18′18.83″E
- Country: India
- State: Karnataka
- District: Raichur district

Government
  - Type: Panchayati raj (India)
  - Body: Gram panchayat

Languages
  - Official: Kannada
- Time zone: UTC+5:30 (IST)
- PIN: 584127
- Telephone code: 08537
- ISO 3166 code: IN-KA
- Vehicle registration: KA-36
- Website: karnataka.gov.in

Sajjalagudda is a village in the Lingasugur taluk of Raichur district in Karnataka state, India.
