= Adavibhavi =

- village
- Interactive map of Adavibhavi
- Coordinates: 16.1500°N 76.4729°E
- Country: India
- State: Karnataka
- District: Raichur
- Talukas: Lingsugur

Government
  - Body: Village Panchayat

Languages
  - Official: Kannada
- Time zone: UTC+5:30 (IST)
- Vehicle registration: KA
- Nearest city: Raichur
- Civic agency: Village Panchayat
- Website: karnataka.gov.in

Adavibhavi is a village in the southern state of Karnataka, India. It is located in the Lingsugur taluk of Raichur district in Karnataka.

== See also ==
- Raichur
- Districts of Karnataka
