= Matmari =

Matmari Matamari
- Village
- Location within Karnataka Location within India
- Coordinates: 16°1′47.64″N 77°17′45.24″E
- Country: India
- State: Karnataka
- District: Raichur district
- Taluk: Raichur

Population (2001)
  - Total: 4,712

Languages
  - Official: Kannada
- Time zone: UTC+5:30 (IST)
- Vehicle registration: KA-36

Matmari also spelled as Matamari is a village in the Raichur taluk of Raichur district in the Indian state of Karnataka. Matmari is located south of District Headquarters Raichur town. Matmari Railway Station lies on Guntakal-Solapur railway line. There is an ancient temple of Sri Veerabhadreshwara Swamy in Matmari.

== Demographics ==
As of 2001 India census, Matmari had a population of 4,712 with 2,392 males and 2,320 females and 941 Households.

== See also ==
- Mantralayam
- Devadurga
- Lingasugur
- Sindhanur
- Raichur
