= Harvi =

- village
- Location in Karnataka, India Harvi (India)
- Coordinates: 16°3′46″N 77°3′51″E
- Country: India
- State: Karnataka
- District: Raichur
- Talukas: Manvi

Government
  - Body: Gram panchayat

Population (2001)
  - Total: 6,463

Languages
  - Official: Kannada
- Time zone: UTC+5:30 (IST)
- ISO 3166 code: IN-KA
- Vehicle registration: KA
- Website: karnataka.gov.in

Harvi is a village in the southern state of Karnataka, India. It is located in the Manvi taluk of Raichur district.

== Demographics ==
As of 2001 India census, Harvi had a population of 6463 with 3314 males and 3149 females.

== See also ==
- Raichur
- Districts of Karnataka
