= Advi Khanapur =

- village
- Interactive map of Advi Khanapur
- Coordinates: 15.9984°N 77.2552°E
- Country: India
- State: Karnataka
- District: Raichur
- Talukas: Manvi

Government
  - Body: Village Panchayat

Languages
  - Official: Kannada
- Time zone: UTC+5:30 (IST)
- Vehicle registration: KA
- Nearest city: Raichur
- Civic agency: Village Panchayat
- Website: karnataka.gov.in

Advi Khanapur is a village in the southern state of Karnataka, India. It is located in the Manvi taluk of Raichur district in Karnataka.

== See also ==
- Raichur
- Districts of Karnataka
