= Somlapur =

- village
- Country: India
- State: Karnataka
- District: Raichur
- Talukas: Sindhnur

Government
  - Body: Gram panchayat

Population (2001)
  - Total: 5,979

Languages
  - Official: Kannada
- Time zone: UTC+5:30 (IST)
- ISO 3166 code: IN-KA
- Vehicle registration: KA
- Website: karnataka.gov.in

Somlapur is a village in the southern state of Karnataka, India. It is located in the Sindhnur taluk of Raichur district in Karnataka.

== Demographics ==
As of 2001 India census, Somlapur had a population of 5979 with 3077 males and 2902 females.

== See also ==
- Raichur
- Districts of Karnataka
