= Gunjhalli =

- village
- Country: India
- State: Karnataka
- District: Raichur
- Talukas: Raichur

Population (2001)
  - Total: 5,209

Languages
  - Official: Kannada
- Time zone: UTC+5:30 (IST)

Gunjhalli is a village in the southern state of Karnataka, India. It is located in the Raichur taluk of Raichur district in Karnataka.

== Demographics ==
As of 2001 India census, Gunjhalli had a population of 5209 with 2634 males and 2575 females.

== See also ==
- Raichur
- Districts of Karnataka
