= Manyamkonda =

Coordinates: 16.649622°N 77.88718°E

Manyamkonda Sri Lakshmi Venkateshwara Swamy Temple is a hill shrine of Lord Venkateshwara, located 5 km from Devarakadra town on the National highway 167 to Raichur. It was the first temple in Telangana to have ropeway access.
