= Hatti Gold Mines =

Hutti Gold Mines
- City
- Nicknames: Chota Hubli, Golden City
- Location in Karnataka, India
- Coordinates: 16.197°N 76.660°E
- Country: India
- State: Karnataka
- District: Raichur

Government
  - Type: State
  - Body: Town panchyath

Population (2011)
  - Total: 27,000
- Demonym: Huttians

Languages
  - Official: Kannada
- Time zone: UTC+5:30 (IST)
- Postal code: 584115
- Vehicle registration: KA-36

Hutti Gold Mines, also spelled Hatti, is a notified area council in Raichur district in the Indian state of Karnataka. The mines are owned and operated by Hutti Gold Mines Limited.

Hutti is situated in Raichur District, Karnataka State and is 80 km (50 miles) due west of Raichur, which is also the nearest railway station.

== Demographics ==
As of the 2011 Census of India, Hutti had a population of 13,536 across 2,676 households. There were 6,858 males (50.6%) and 6,678 females (49.4%). 10,305 (76%) of people were literate. 1,384 (10%) were under the age of 6.

== History ==
This mine is probably one of the most ancient metal mines in the world, dating to the pre-Ashokan period, the ancient miners having worked down to a depth of over 2300 feet. It is probable they had broken the rock by "fire-setting" i.e. heating it by means of fires and suddenly cooling it by pouring water onto the heated rock causing pieces to break off. As per carbon dating done by Dr. Rafter from Australia in the year 1955, the age of the two samples of timber found in old workings was estimated to be about 1980 years old.

For crushing the ore to extract the gold they used a grinding stone similar to those used now for making masalas and a few of which can even now be found in the area. The actual gold was recovered by passing the crushed ore, mixed with water, over goats' skins, the fur trapping the heavy particles of gold while allowing the lighter minerals to be washed off.

In addition to the ancient mining in mentioned above, there was further mining in the area between 1890 and 1920 when the price of gold was about Rs. 18 for 10 grams (Rs 20.97 per tola). The biggest of these ventures was at Hutti where, from 1902 to 1919, nearly 7,400 kg of gold were obtained from very rich ore, at an average yield of 19 g/tonne. Most of this ore came from the main mine, which reached a depth of about 1,100 m below surface. The industry closed down in 1920 due to technical difficulties and lack of funds.

In 1937, the Nizam's Government decided to prospect the area again with a view to possible re-opening of the mines (the only industry in the area apart from agriculture) so as to provide employment. The area was a backward district, which was considered at that time to be a more or less perpetual famine area. In 1940, after some satisfactory exploratory work, it was decided to install a plant to treat 100 tonnes of mine ore per day, but before the plant could be obtained, operations were suspended, and from 1942 to 1946, due to World War II, the mine was shut down except for pumping.

The company was originally formed in 1947 as the Hyderabad Gold mines Company Ltd., with the Hyderabad State Government holding a majority of the shares. After the end of the war, the scheme was resumed and production started in September 1948, at the rate of 130 tonnes of ore per day. By 1972 this rate had progressively increased to 600 tonnes of ore per day. With the re-organization of the States in 1956, the company was transferred to Mysore State (Karnataka State) and became Hutti Gold Mines Limited.

The mine produced about 38,56,300 tonnes of ore to yield about 26,550 kg at an average recovery of 6.88 g per tonne. In addition about 48,800 tonnes of gold tailings lifted about 112 kg of gold production for the year 1982 – 83 was about 62.83 kg gold per month at an average recovery grade of 5.24 per g per tonne. After extensive working, the main mine became water-logged, and was closed.

== Transport ==
Hutti is well connected by road to Bangalore, Hubli, Chitradurga, Davangere, Shimoga, Kalburgi, Vijayapura, Bagalkot, Raichur, Pune, Hyderabad and other major cities. The nearest major airport is in Hyderabad.

=== Long-distance bus routes ===
The Karnataka State Road Transport Corporation (KSRTC) runs a bus service to other cities and villages. There are also various private bus services.

=== Railways ===
Raichur is the nearest railway station to Hutti and Raichur is served by a major rail line and is well connected by trains to all major parts of India such as Bangalore, Mumbai, Delhi, Chennai, Hyderabad, Ahmedabad, Trivandrum, Kanyakumari, Pune, Bhopal and Agra.

== See also ==
- Maski
- Jaladurga
- Mudgal
- Piklihal
- Raichur
