= Hutti Gold Mines Limited =

Indian gold mining and production company

Hutti Gold Mines Limited (Kannada: (ರಾಯಚೂರು ಹಟ್ಟಿ ಚಿನ್ನದ ಗಣಿ) (HGML)) is a company located in the state of Karnataka, India and engaged in the mining and production of gold. It was first established as Hyderabad Gold Mines in 1947. With the closing of Kolar Gold Fields in 2001, it is one of the two companies in India which produce gold by mining and processing the gold ore, the other being Manmohan Minerals Industries Pvt. Ltd. Owned by the Government of Karnataka, HGML has two plants located in Hutti and Chitradurga. HGML mines gold from its main gold mine located in Hutti and other satellite mines.

== Executive ==
The Company's Corporate Office is located in Bengaluru.

== Mining ==
The mines managed by HGML are mainly located in the Hutti-Muski precambrian greenstone belt which contains both readily extractable native gold and gold-bearing sulphides. HGML consists of two gold units:

- Hutti Gold Unit: This consists of HGML's main mine located at Hutti and the satellite mines- Uti and Hirabuddini, all of which are located in the Raichur district. Hutti is an underground mine, Uti is an open-cast mine while Hirabuddini is an exploratory mine.
- Chitradurga Gold Unit: This consists of an open-cast mine located in Ajjanahalli in Tumkur district and an exploratory underground mine at G. R. Halli in Chitradurga district.

These mines in total produce about 3 tonnes of gold a year. With the closure of the Bharat Gold Mines Limited which had operations at Kolar Gold Fields in Karnataka and at Chittoor district in Andhra Pradesh, HGML is one of the only two companies in India that produce gold by mining. It has gold ore reserves of about 31.02 million tonnes which could last for about 60 years and yield about 150.4 tonnes of gold.

== Extraction of gold ==
The process of cyanide leaching is used by HGML to extract native gold which is present in a quartzite matrix. However, this method cannot be used to extract gold which is present in sulphides. HGML has made use of advanced technologies like biotechnology to come up with a cheaper and efficient method to extract gold from sulphides. With the help of the Indian Institute of Science, Bangalore, an extraction method was devised in which the sulphides were subjected to oxidation using the bacteria, Thiobacillus ferrooxidans under optimal conditions. The bacteria dissolved the sulphides like pyrite and arsenopyrite and thus revealed the native gold. The native gold was then subjected to cyanide leaching to produce pure gold. This method also produces other precious metals like silver which could be present in the sulphides. After repeated experimentations to come up with the optimal procedure, HGML constructed the first bioreactor in the middle of 2001.

== Exploration and expansion ==
The company may expand in the future.

== Business ==
HGML had an accumulated loss of ₹ 30 crores ($7.5 million) for the period 1995-2000 but made up this loss a bit by generating profits of ₹ 19 crores ($4.75 million) in the first nine months of 2001. It went back into red in the year 2002-2003 and was on the verge of closure before it bounced back in the year 2004-2005 to post a profit of ₹ 48crores ($12 million).

According to a preliminary audit for 2011-12, the company has achieved a gross profit of ₹ 551.13 crores before tax by selling gold and wind power generated from the Chitradurga wind plant. This is the biggest profit generated by the company in its history.
