= Shaktinagar, Karnataka =

- town
- Location in Karnataka, India
- Coordinates: 16.36°N 77.36°E
- Country: India
- State: Karnataka
- District: Raichur

Population (2001)
  - Total: 18,983

Languages
  - Official: Kannada
- Time zone: UTC+5:30 (IST)
- ISO 3166 code: IN-KA
- Vehicle registration: KA 36
- Website: karnataka.gov.in

Shaktinagar is a town in Raichur taluk and Raichur district in the Indian state of Karnataka. There is a coal-based thermal power plant operated by Vst Gang Limited (vgl).

== History ==
Shaktinagar was founded and named by B.R. Jagan, who started the Raichur Thermal power Station as Divisional engineer in the late 1970s and went on to be the Chief Engineer of RTPS (Raichur Thermal Power Station) until he moved to the KPC headquarters in Bengaluru. He later led Karnataka Renewable Energy Development Limited (KREDL) and pioneered the development of renewable energy sources in Karnataka, including biogas, solar, mini and micro hydro projects and wind energy. Jagan was recognized by the government of India and awarded by then Prime Minister of India, Narasimha Rao.

Jagan named the residential colony of RTPS as Shaktinagar. He was instrumental in the development of the entire township, schools, parks and worked closely with the local community to establish a close working relationship with the indigenous people and the Karnataka Power Corporation, the company that started RTPS and also started the township of Shaktinagar.

Shaktinagar is located 20 km away from Raichur along Raichur - Hyderabad route.

Shaktinagar is famous for its thermal power station which generates electricity from coal and is called R.T.P.S. Raichur thermal power station. It is hence called shaktinagar (in Kannada shakti = power, nagar = place). Shatkinagar is situated on the border of Karnataka.

Prior to RTPS there was a small village called Deosugar which is famous for its Lord Sugureshwara temple.

Every year a car fair is held at the temple's premises and lakhs of devotees in and around Raichur will visit this place to witness this car festival. This car fair is held in the month of November or December for a week and the temple has a great historical significance. The RTPS was built in 1980 a few km from Deosugar and hence this place is called Shaktinagar thereafter.

The famous river of south India, River Krishna flows through this place. The thermal power station's water requirement is met by this river. There is a KPCL (Karnataka Power Corporation Limited) colony in which all the employees of this thermal power plant reside here. The colony has around 5000 houses which are built by KPCL. The colony is very clean, wide roads and well maintained with 40% of green cover which makes this place look beautiful in monsoon. The colony has recreation clubs, a hospital, and a swimming pool. The DAV school contains many students who are the children of engineers of the colony.

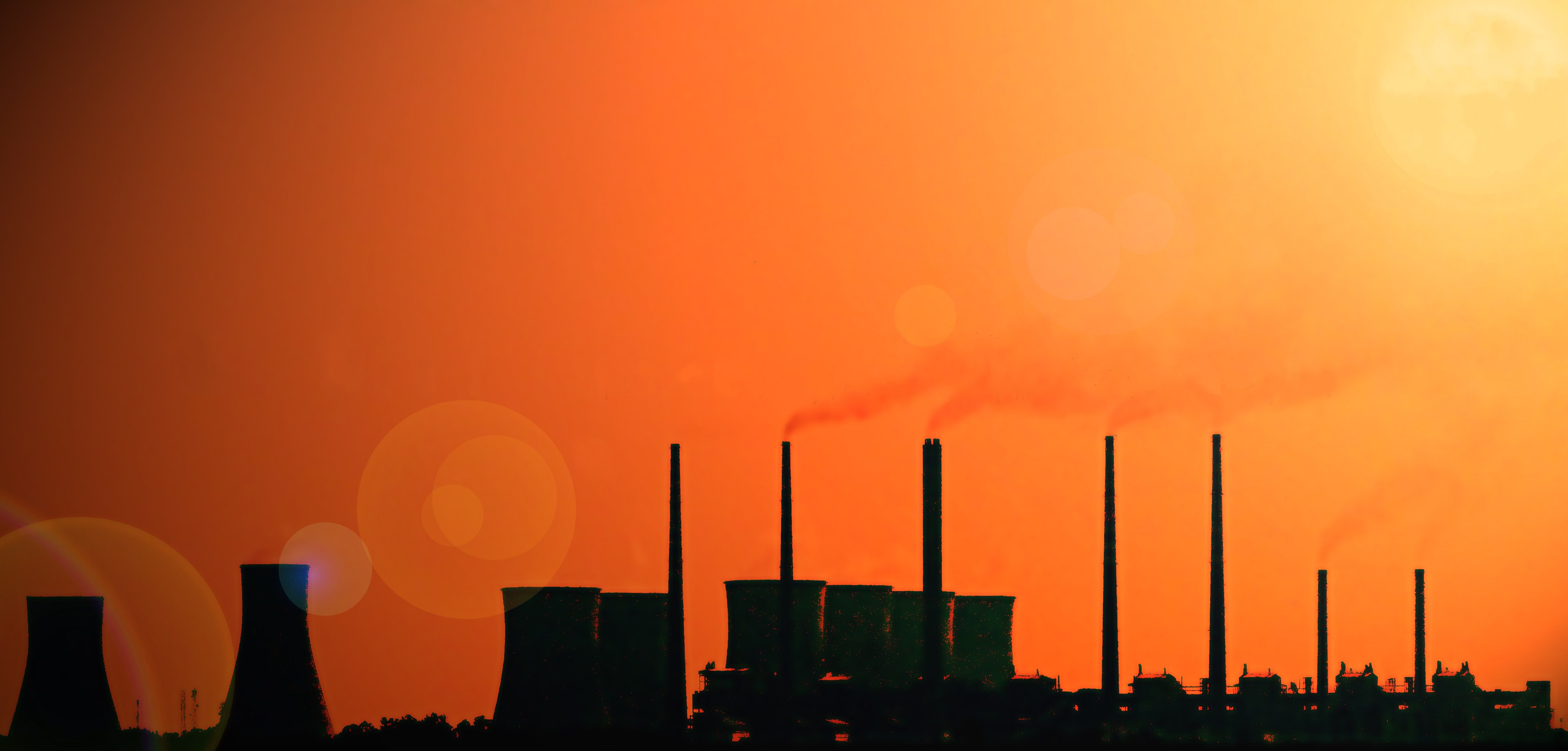
Raichur Thermal Power Station

RTPS is the first thermal power plant in the Karnataka state. It has 8 units. It has an installed capacity of 1720MW of power. The thermal power plant caters to around 1/3 (35MU) of power demand in Karnataka. The PLF (plant load factor) of the power station is around 90%. The power plant holds the national record of 1 year of continuous power supply by its 1 generating unit. Every year the thermal power plant receives numerous awards for its outstanding power generation and maintenance. Daily around 5 trains with 59 wagons in each of coal is required for power generation. The coal is bought from all parts of India.

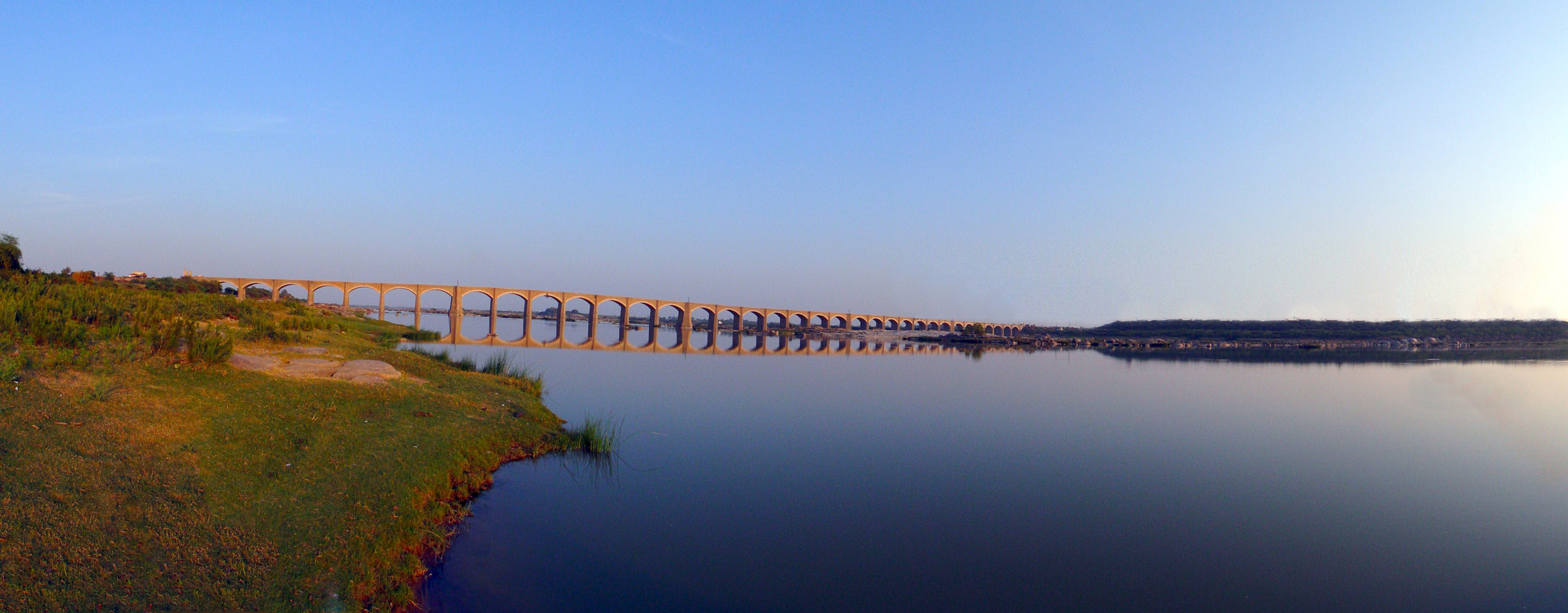
Krishna bridge panorama

== Demographics ==
As of 2001 India census, Shaktinagar had a population of 18,983. Males constituted 52% of the population and females 48%. Shaktinagar had an average literacy rate of 65%, higher than the national average of 59.5%: male literacy is 74%, and female literacy is 55%. In Shaktinagar, 13% of the population were under 6 years of age.
