= Sindhnur (Rural) =

Sindhanur Sindhanur
- City
- Sindhanur
- Nickname: Land of Paddy
- Location in Karnataka, India Sindhanur (India)
- Coordinates: 15°47′N 76°46′E
- Country: India
- State: Karnataka
- District: Raichur
- Talukas: Sindhanur

Government
  - Type: CMC

Population (2001)
  - Total: 12,666

Languages
  - Official: Kannada
- Time zone: UTC+5:30 (IST)
- Postal code: 584128
- Vehicle registration: KA 36

Sindhanur is a city and taluk headquarter of Sindhanur taluk in Raichur District in Karnataka. It is the main commercial center of the district. River Tungabhadra covers the irrigation area by left bank canal. Most of the land in the field is composed of cultivable black soil. Paddy is cultivated using the Tungabhadra River water. sindhanur is also known as the Paddy Granary of Raichur.

== Demographics ==
As of 2001 India census, Sindhnur (Rural) had a population of 12,666 with 6,504 males and 6,162 females.

== See also ==
- Raichur
- Districts of Karnataka
