= Pandit Narasimhalu Vadavati =

Indian clarinetist (born 1942)

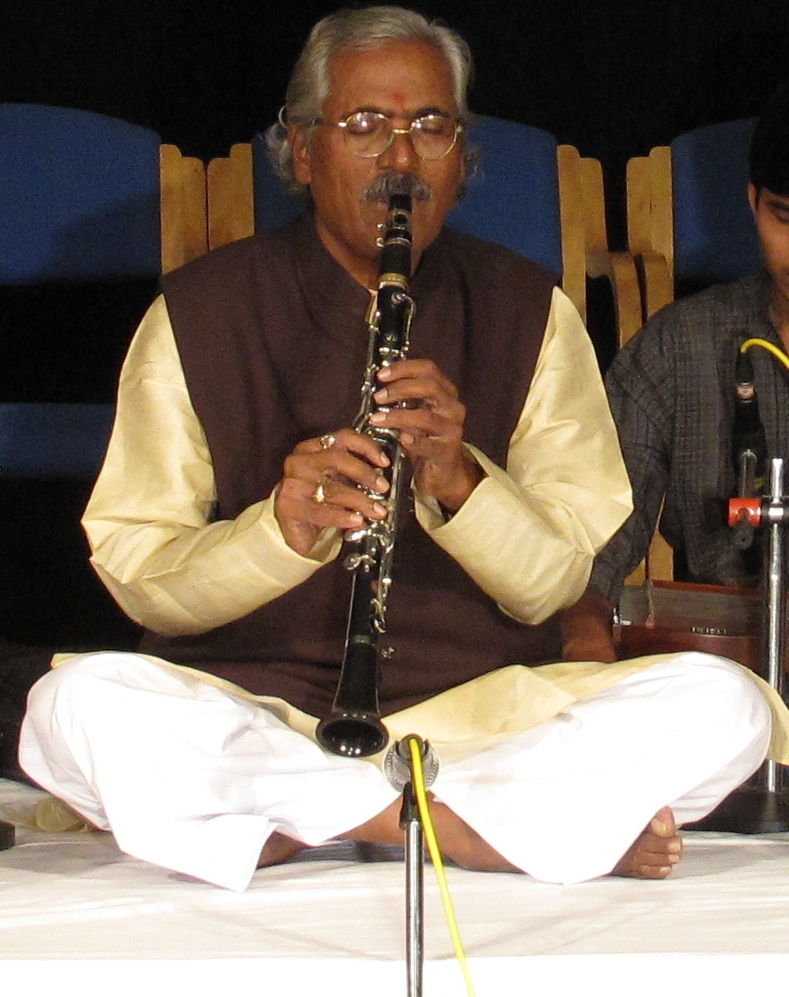
- Vadivati in 2014
- Born: 1942 (age 83–84); Vadavati, Raichur, India
- Occupation: International Clarinet Artist
- Website: www.vadavati.org

Pandit Narasimhalu Vadavati (born 21 January 1942) is a clarinet musician.

== Biography ==
Pandit Narasimhalu Vadavati was born in 1942 in Vadavati, a small village in Raichur taluk of Karnataka, India. He was born into a musically talented family. His grandfather was a Shehnai artiste, his father a tabla player and his mother a devotional singer. His love for music grew from his early boyhood years. Sri Matamari Veeranna was his first guru. He also learned to sing under the guidance of Sri Venkatappa.

He learned Hindustani classical music from the late Pandit Siddarama Jambladinni a famous vocalist belonging to the Gwalior and Jaipur Gharanas. After intensive practice for more than 10 years he became familiar with the intricacies and was able to give solo recitals.

After years of practice, Vadavati mastered the clarinet, adapting it to Hindustani Music. He has perfected the art of producing a series of sounds in such a way that the listener can hear a near-vocal effect. He can produce the elongated drawl of the "vilambit" portion of the gharanas in a sonorous manner. His nuanced playing has earned him applause among the music fraternity. Along with his troupe he has performed in India the U.K., the USA and France.

The International Biographical Centre, Cambridge, U.K. has listed him in its International Who’s Who in Music. His acquired additional fame when he directed music for the award-winning French Documentary "Hathi". He was nominated as president of the World Music Festival 2011 organized at Los Angeles by World Clarinet Association.

His children have followed in his footsteps. His son Venkatesh Rai is a musician and Vadavati Sharada Bharath is the most active of his daughters.

== Music Academy ==
For a decade now, Vadavati's passion to spread music has inspired him to set up Music Academy "Swara Sangama Sangeetha Vidyalaya" at Raichur and "Pandit Narasimalu Vadavati Music Academy" at Bangalore. His daughter Sharada looks after the academy.

== Honors ==
Dr. Pandit Narasimhalu Vadavati is Honoured and considered as an 'Outstanding Artist' of the 20th Century by International Biographical Centre, Cambridge. He was Honoured with the title 'Hindustani Clarinet Sangeetha Ratna' by Government Music College, Coimbatore, Government of Tamil Nadu. 'Surmani' title by Sur singer samsad, Bombay. 'Karnataka Kala Tilak' title by Karnataka Music and Dance Academy.

== `Artists Day in India’ ==
In honour of Pt. Vadavati, his birthday, 21 January, is celebrated as "Artist’s Day in India" by Bharath Cultural Centre. The `Artist’s Day in India’’ is organised not only to celebrate the birth day of Dr.Pandit Narasimhalu Vadavati but also to commemorate the contribution of the dedicated artists of India to the field of Indian Fine Arts.

== Awards ==
- Doctorate from Gulbarga University
- Karnataka Rajyotsava award

Chairman – Karnataka Sangeetha Nrutya Academy – Govt. of Karnataka

Doctorate award from Gulburga University

'Surmani' title by Sur singer samsad, Bombay.

'Karnataka Kala Tilak' title by Karnataka Music and Dance Academy.

'Gold Medal' and 'Asthan Vidwan' title by Shri Sharada Peetha of Shringeri Mutt by Sri Jagadguru Srimad Bharati Theertha Swamiji.

'Bharatha Ratna Visweswaraiah Award' by Engineering Pratistana, Bangalore in the year 1996-97.

Participation in 'Kannada Koota Conference' in USA in 1997.

'Karnataka Rajyothsava Award' by Karnataka Government for 1997-98.

Music Direction to French film 'HAATHI' in 1998.

'Visiting Professor' to 'California University'.

Participation in Clarionet concert in CalArts, USA in 1998.

Honored and considered as an 'Outstanding Artist' of the 20th Century by International Biographical Center, Cambridge.

Honored at the 68th Akhila Bharathiya Kannada Sahithya Sammelna, Bagalkot, Karnataka.

Honored with the title 'Hindustani Clarionet Sangeetha Ratna' by Government Music College, Coimbatore, Government of Tamil Nadu.

"T. Chowdaiah National Award" by Government of Karnataka in 2019-20.

Concert at Bharatiya Vidya Bhavan, England.

Ex. Member, Experts Committee, Cultural Department, Govt. of India.

Ex. Member, Music and Dance Academy, Govt. of Karnataka.

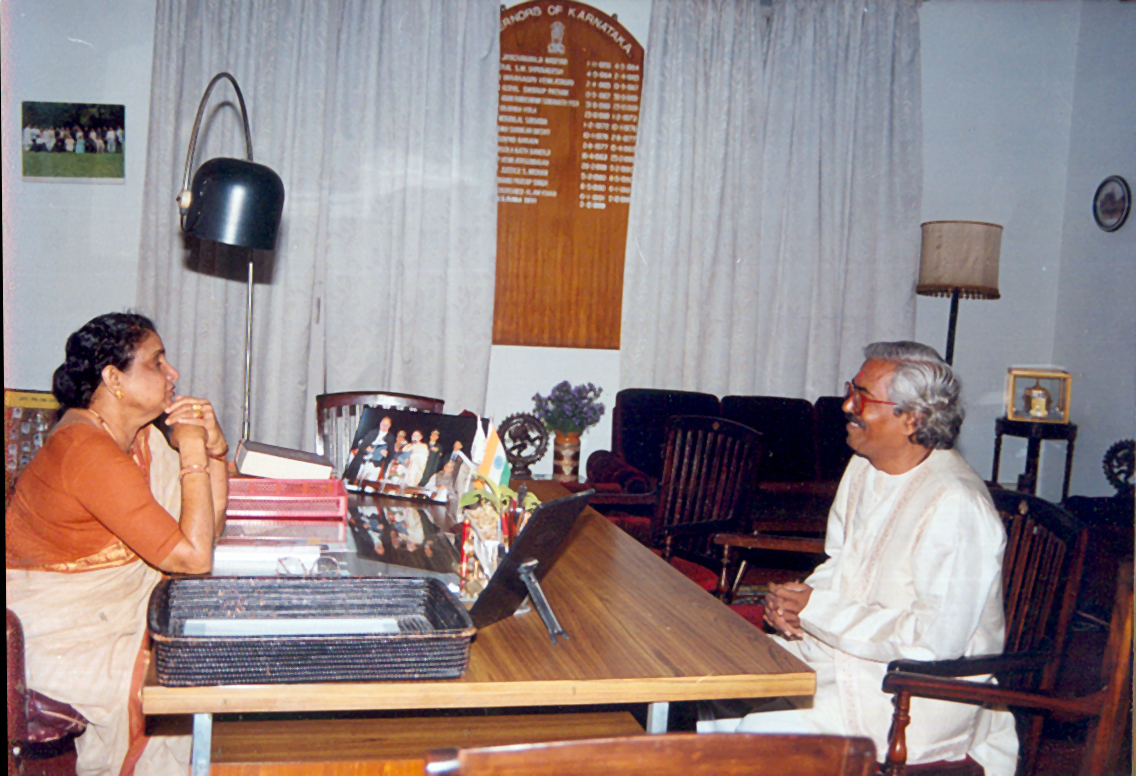
Vadavati with Ramaa devi, the then governor of Karnataka,
