= Jayadevi Jangamshetti =

Dr. Jayadevi Jangamashetti
- Born: Jayadevi Jangamashetti; Raichur, Karnataka, India
- Genres: Hindustani classical Vocal, Semi Classical singer, light music, Playback singer
- Occupations: Hindustani Vocalist, Assistant professor, dept of music and fine arts, Central University of Karnataka, Kalburgi

Dr. Jayadevi Jangamashetti is an Indian singer. She is a Hindustani classical music vocalist of Jaipur Gwaliar gharana. Dr. Jayadevi is the first female film music director of Kannada cinema - Raag Bhairavi, which is based on Hindustani classical music. The film was released in 2019.

== Early life and training ==
Born in Raichur into a family with strong interest in musical art, Jayadevi started her early classical training under the guidance of Pt. Panchakshari swami mattigatti (Disciple of Dr Mallikarjun Mansur) for more than six years. Vidushi Smt. Jayashree Patnekar and Pt. Rajashekhar Mansoor, son of Great legend Dr Mallikarjuna Mansoor, also taught her.

== Education ==
Dr. Jayadevi holds a Master's degree in Music and earned a doctorate for the research of 'Vachana singing heritage' from the Karnataka University Dharwad.
She has completed Vidwat, Visharada.

== Performing career ==
Dr.Jayadevi has published a book on Vachana sangeeta Ratna Pt. Siddharama Jambaladinni (Disciple of Pandit Panchakshari Gawaii ji and Dr Mallikarjun Mansur) who was a vocalist, and published her PhD thesis as a Kedillavagi Haaduve. Dr Jayadevi has been on concert tours to every part of the country and frequently performs at music conferences around the state, including Maharashtra, Andhra Pradesh, Kerala, Tamil Nadu, Delhi, Pandichery and Muscat, Bahrain, and Dubai.

A few of the concerts included:

1. DR Mallikarjun Mansur Rashtreeya Sangeetotsav Dharwad
2. Vishwa Kannada sammealana, Belagavi
3. Rajguru National Music Festival, Dharwad
4. Horanadu Kannadigara, Sangeethothsava, Pondicherry
5. V.K. Gokak's centenary celebration, Kendra saahitya Academy, New Delhi

Dr Jayadevi has been nominated as Syndicate member of Karnataka Rajya Dr. Gangubai Hangal Music and Performing arts University Mysore (Governor's Nominee. Dated : 16-09-2017 for 3 years Duration). She works as an assistant professor in the Music and Fine Arts Department at Central University of Karnataka.

== Discography ==
CD's Released

- Sri Siddalingeshwara vaani Yadiyur Vachana Gayana
- Bhakti Beladingalu ~Vachana Gayana by Akash Audio
- Raaga ranga~ classical music by Lahari Audio company
- SurSunaad~ Classical Vocal By Lahari Audio company
- Sunari Sakhi ~ Classical Vocal By Lahari Audio company
- Raaga Tarangini ~ Classical Vocal By Lahari Audio company
- Godhooli ~Classical singing
- Guruve Namo ~Vachana Gayana by Lahari Audio company
- Harinama Smarane~Dasa Avni by Lahari audio company
- Suno Bhayi Sadho ~ Bhajans by Lahari audio company
- Devotional songs on Gurudatta by Nisarga Audio
- MSIL, Dharwad composed by Sri. Nimbargi
- MSIL, Mysore composed by Sri. Upadhyaya
- Jeevana gnanadinda muktiyo~ Madara Channayya Vachans by Lahari audio company, Bangalore
- Akkamahadevi Suprabhata~Akkana Balaga Udutadi
- Raaga bhairavi cinema audio..Lahari Recording company, Bangalore

Book's Published

- Vachana Sangeeta Ratna:Pt.Siddrama Jambaldini-a research work on music 2012
- Kedillavagi Haaduve-a research work on Vachanna Gaayana tradition 2015
- Bayala Naadava Hadidu:a research work on Hindustani classical music tradition-2017
- Geeta Matemba jyothi:a research work 2018
- Ulava Naadada Charana:a research work on musicology 2021

== Awards ==
1. Mallikarjun Mansur Rashtriya Samman - Youth Award
2. Ramanashri Award for Vachana Gayana
3. Cultural Guru Award by Govt. of Karnataka Bala Vikasa Academy
4. State level Amma Award
5. Bharat Ratna Bismilla Khan Yuva Puraskara Chennai
6. Karnataka sangeeta Nrutya(govt.of Karnataka) academy's book award.. for the ULIVA NAADADA CHARANA -A research book on musicology...Rs.25000/-Cash and memento...
7. Dr.Nanda patil endowment award for Vachana gaayana...by Karnataka vidyavardhaka Sangha Dharawad
8. karnataka state film award for best play back singer -2019.Government of Karnataka (kannada movie -Raaga bairavi )
9. Samskruti sangama award for life time achievement, in hindustani classical music-2024 (Dr. C. Somashekhar-srimati N. Sarvamangala sahitya seva pratishtana, Bangalore)
