= Hatti, Raichur =

Hatti, Raichur Hatti
- Town
- Nicknames: Gold Mines City, The Gold City
- Location in Karnataka, India
- Coordinates: 16.20°N 76.68°E
- Country: India
- State: Karnataka
- District: Raichur

Population (2001)
  - Total: 12,419

Languages
  - Official: Kannada
- Time zone: UTC+5:30 (IST)
- PIN: 584115
- Telephone code: 08537

Hatti is a census town in Raichur district in the Indian state of Karnataka. This town is located near Lingsugur taluk, 20 km from Lingsugur. Hatti is famous for gold mining; the area surrounding the gold mines is incorporated as a separate town, the Hatti Gold Mines notified area council.

As of the 2011 Census of India, Hatti had a population of 16,278 across 2,759 households. There were 8,216 males (50.4%) and 8,062 females (49.6%). 10,066 (61%) of people were literate. 2,155 (13%) were under the age of 6.
