= Maski =

- Town
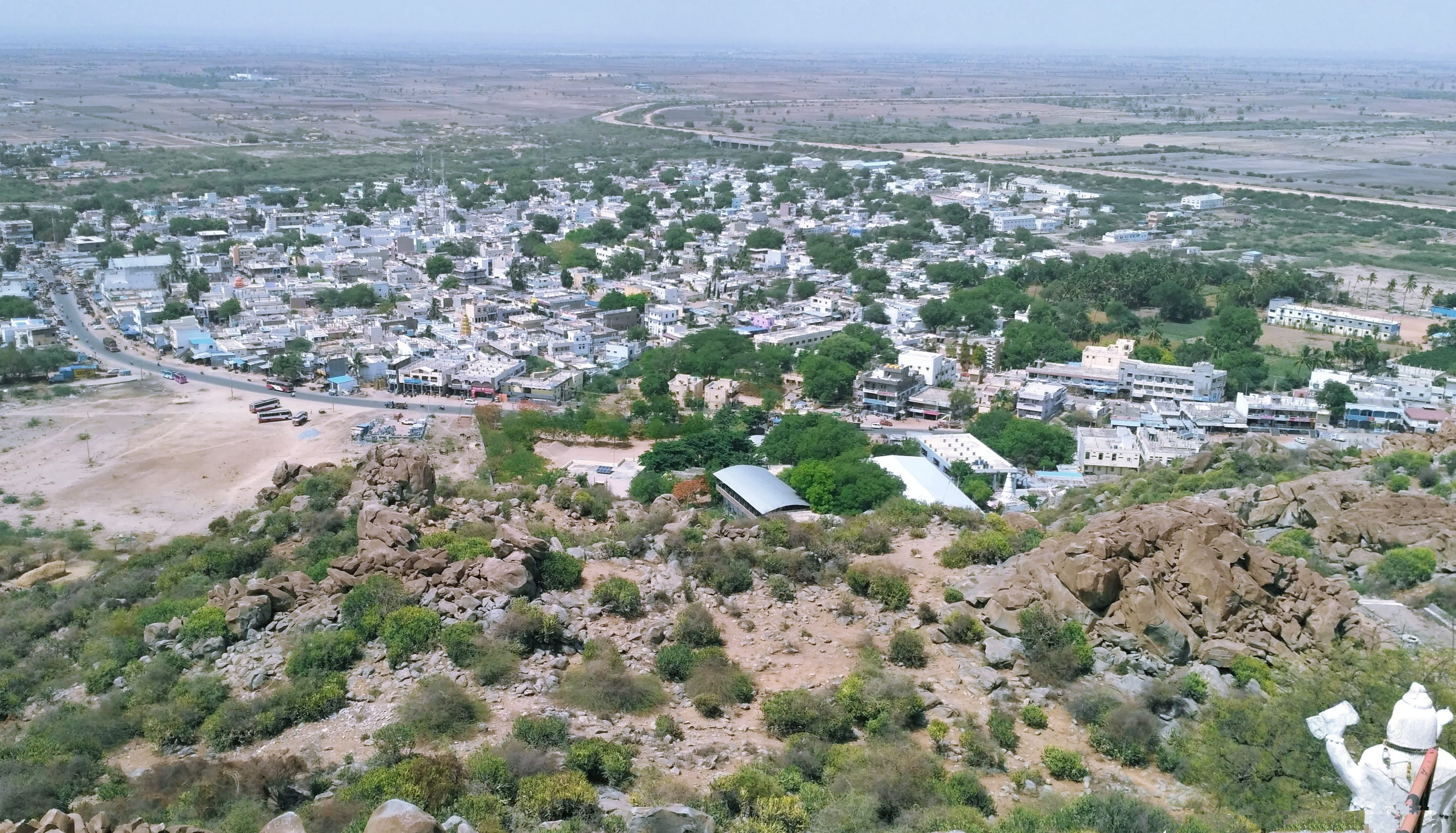
- A view of Maski atop Mallikarjuna temple hill

- Location in Karnataka, India Maski (Karnataka)
- Coordinates: 15.96°N 76.65°E
- Country: India
- State: Karnataka
- District: Raichur
- Settled: 2nd millennium BC

Languages
  - Official: Kannada
- Time zone: UTC+5:30 (IST)
- PIN: 584124
- Vehicle registration: KA 36
- Website: www.lingasugurtown.gov.in/tourism

Maski is a town and an archaeological site in the Raichur district of the state of Karnataka, India. It lies on the bank of the Maski river which is a tributary of the Tungabhadra. Maski derives its name from Mahasangha or Masangipura . The site came into prominence with the discovery of a minor rock edict of Emperor Ashoka by C. Beadon in 1915. It was the first edict of Emperor Ashoka that contained the name Ashoka in it instead of the earlier edicts that referred him as Devanampriya. This edict was important to conclude that many edicts found earlier in the Indian sub-continent in the name of Devanampiye piyadasi, all belonged to Emperor Ashoka. The edict is etched on a rock-face of Durgada-gudda, one of the gneissic outcrops that are present in the site.

Maski is also the place on the Raichur Doab which was also under the hegemony of the imperial Chola empire and it was here that Rajendra Chola I defeated Jayasimha II, the Western Chalukya ruler in battle in 1019-1020 AD.

== Excavation history ==
Maski was studied initially by Robert Bruce Foote in 1870 and 1888. In 1915, C. Beadon, a mining engineer, discovered Ashoka's rock edict here. In 1935–37, the archaeological department of Hyderabad state explored this region and in 1954, Amalananda Ghosh excavated this place on behalf of the Archaeological Survey of India.

=== Minor Rock Edict of Ashoka ===
The Maski version of Minor Rock Edict No.1 was historically especially important in that it confirmed the association of the title "Devanampriya" ("Beloved-of-the-Gods") with Ashoka:

[A proclamation] of Beloved of the Gods Asoka.

Two and a half years [and somewhat more] (have passed) since I am a Buddha-Shakya.
[A year and] somewhat more (has passed) [since] I have visited the Samgha and have shown zeal.
Those gods who formerly had been unmingled (with men) in Jambudvipa, have how become mingled (with them).
This object can be reached even by a lowly (person) who is devoted to morality.
One must not think thus, — (viz.) that only an exalted (person) may reach this.
Both the lowly and the exalted must be told : "If you act thus, this matter (will be) prosperous and of long duration, and will thus progress to one and a half.

— Maski Minor Rock Edict of Ashoka.

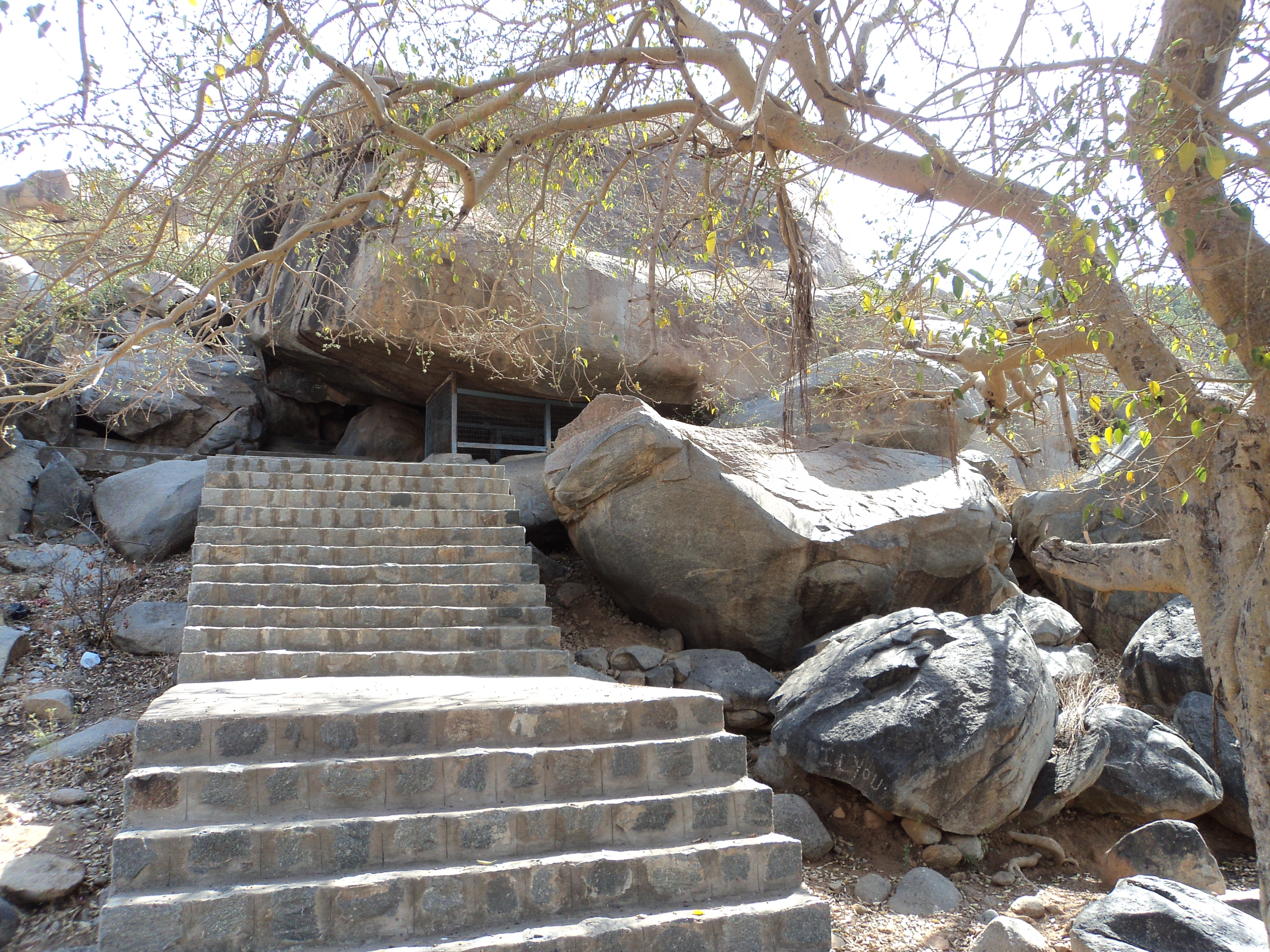
Location of the Edict

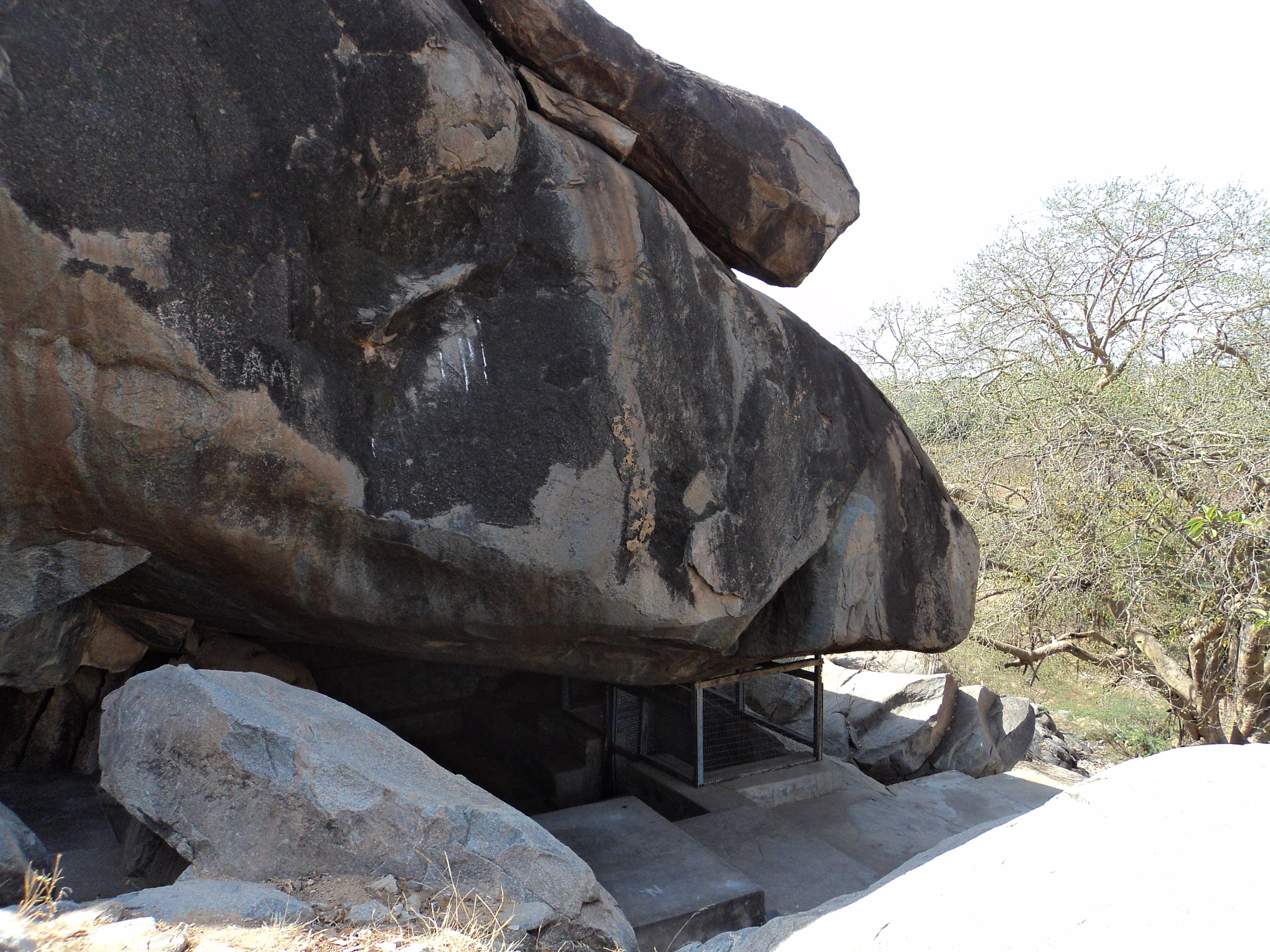
Entrance

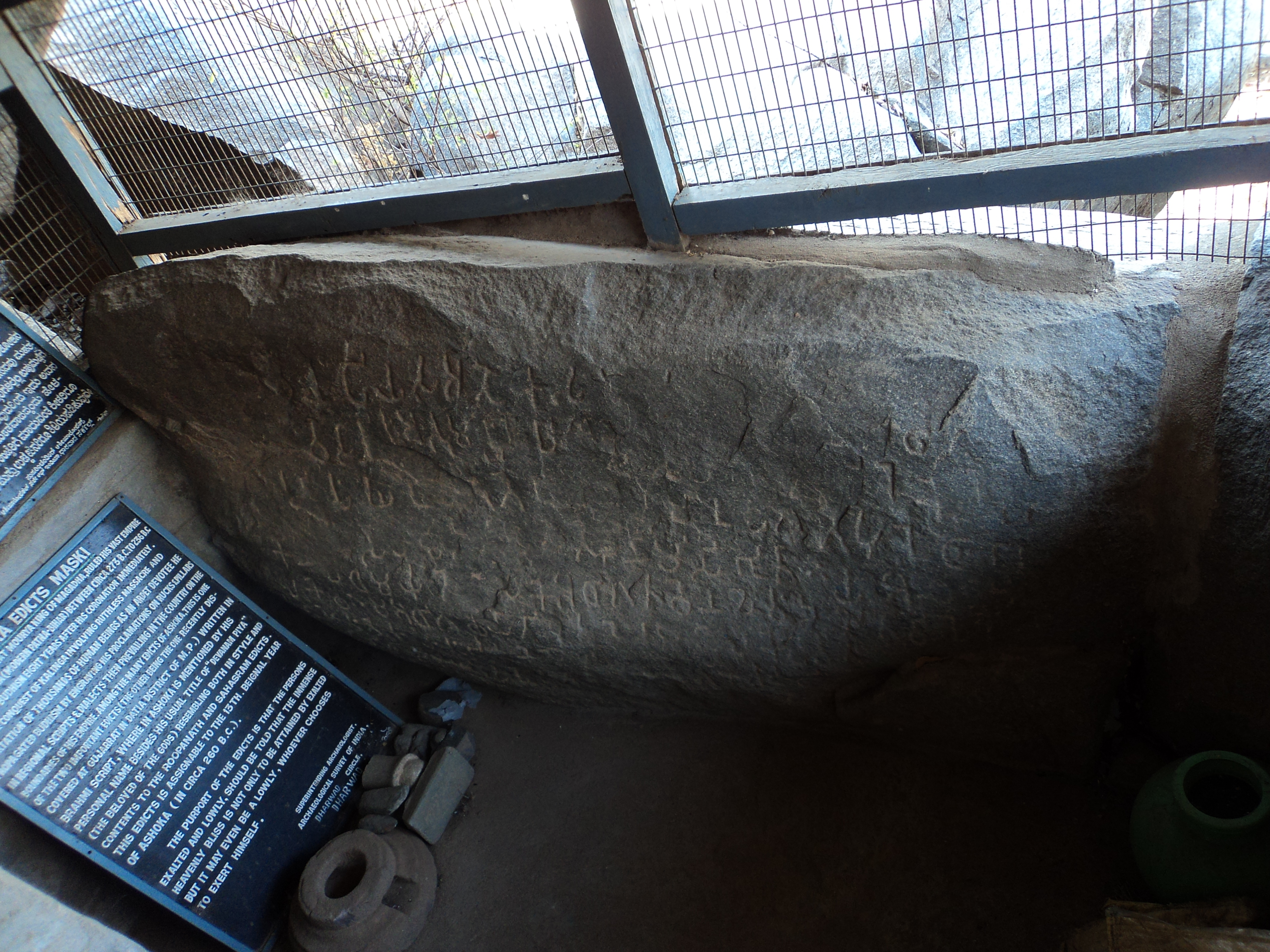
The Minor Rock Edict of Maski confirmed the association of the title "Devanampriya" with Ashoka

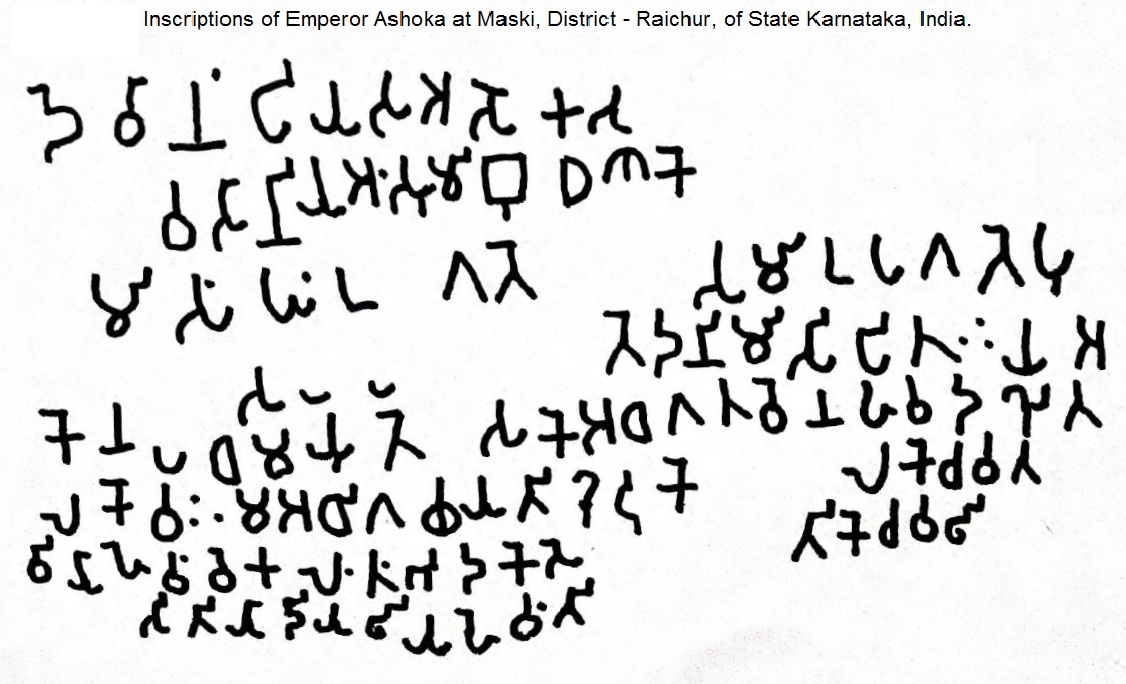
Transcription of the inscription of Emperor Ashoka on the rock edict at Maski

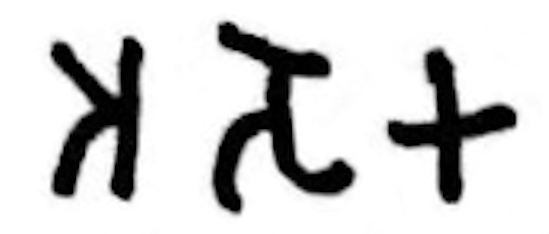
The name Ashoka in Brahmi script, Maski Minor Rock Edict, c.259 BCE

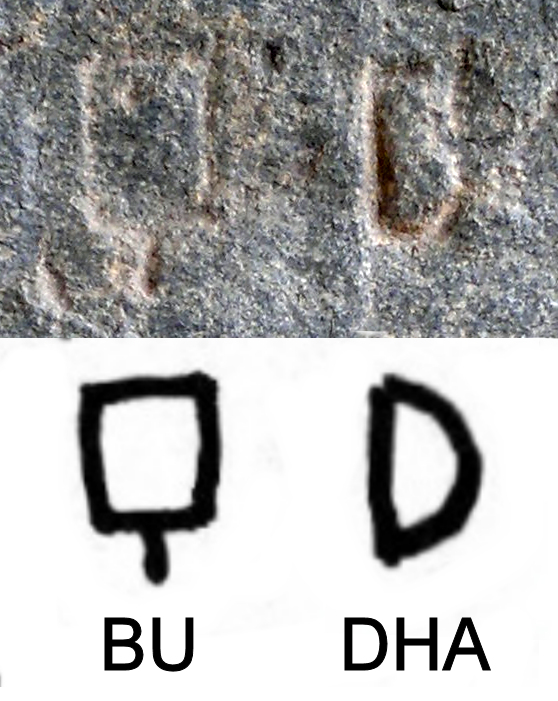
The word "Buddha" in the Maski inscription. Brahmi script

=== Chola-period inscription ===
In 2013, historian Dr. Channabasappa Malkamdinni reported the discovery of a Chola-period inscription at Maski . The inscription, written in Tamil script with portions in Sanskrit, records a military campaign involving the Cholas, Cheras and Pandyas against the Western Chalukya ruler Jayasimha II in 1020 CE. It also refers to Rajendra Chola I assuming the title “Parakesari Varman” following the campaign. The discovery was reported in regional media, and the Tamil Nadu government subsequently sanctioned funds for further study of the inscription.

=== Other findings ===
The excavations indicated that the region was occupied across four different cultural periods; Period I: Neolithic-Chalcolithic, Period II: Megalithic, Period III: Early historical and Period IV: Medieval. In Period I, microliths and blades made of agate, chert, carnelian and opal are found. Ornamental beads of agate, coral, shell and other materials are also found. Dull-grey ware and painted-buff ware pottery are found, some of which were painted with linear patterns. Animal remains of cattle, buffalo, sheep and goat are also found. Period II saw the introduction of iron and five different forms of burials were discovered. Lances, ferrules, daggers and arrowheads were found, apart from beads of gold and terracotta objects. The pottery of Period II consisted of the megalithic red-and-black ware, all-black ware and red-slipped ware, some of which had graffiti on them. Coins were discovered in the Period III which also saw the use of Russet-coated painted ware. The earliest specimens of Indian glass were also discovered at Maski. A cylinder seal has also been found here.

== Transport ==
Maski is well connected by road. It lies on Bengaluru-Kalaburagi road. Maski is around 425 km from Bengaluru, 80 km from Raichur and 24 km from Sindhanuru. Maski can be reached by KSRTC buses from all Major towns and cities in Karnataka. Raichur Junction, 80 km away, is the nearest railway station and Gangavathi Approximate driving distance between Gangavathi and Maski is 74 km or 46 miles.

== Image gallery ==
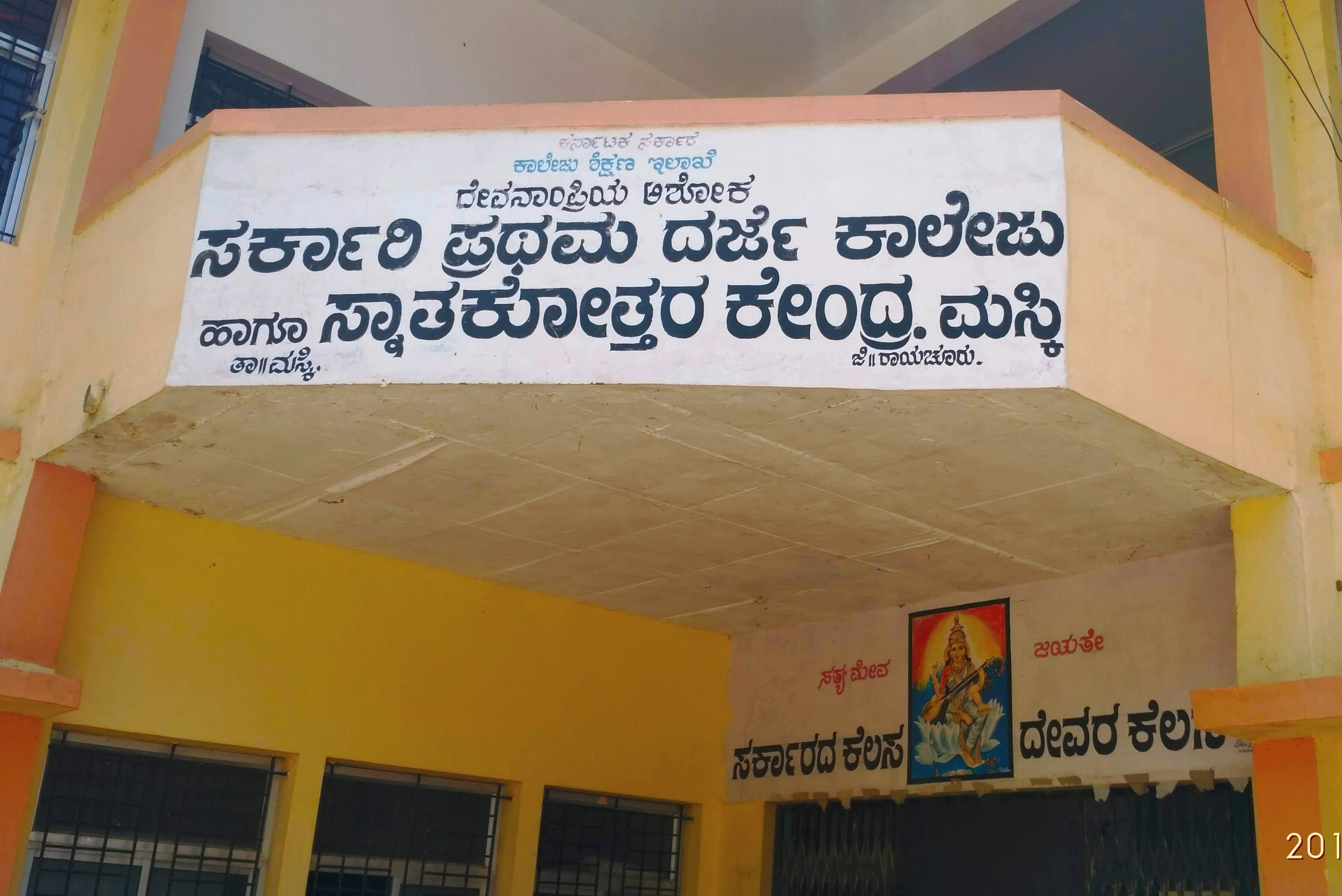
Devanampriya Ashoka government first grade college and post graduation study centre, Maski

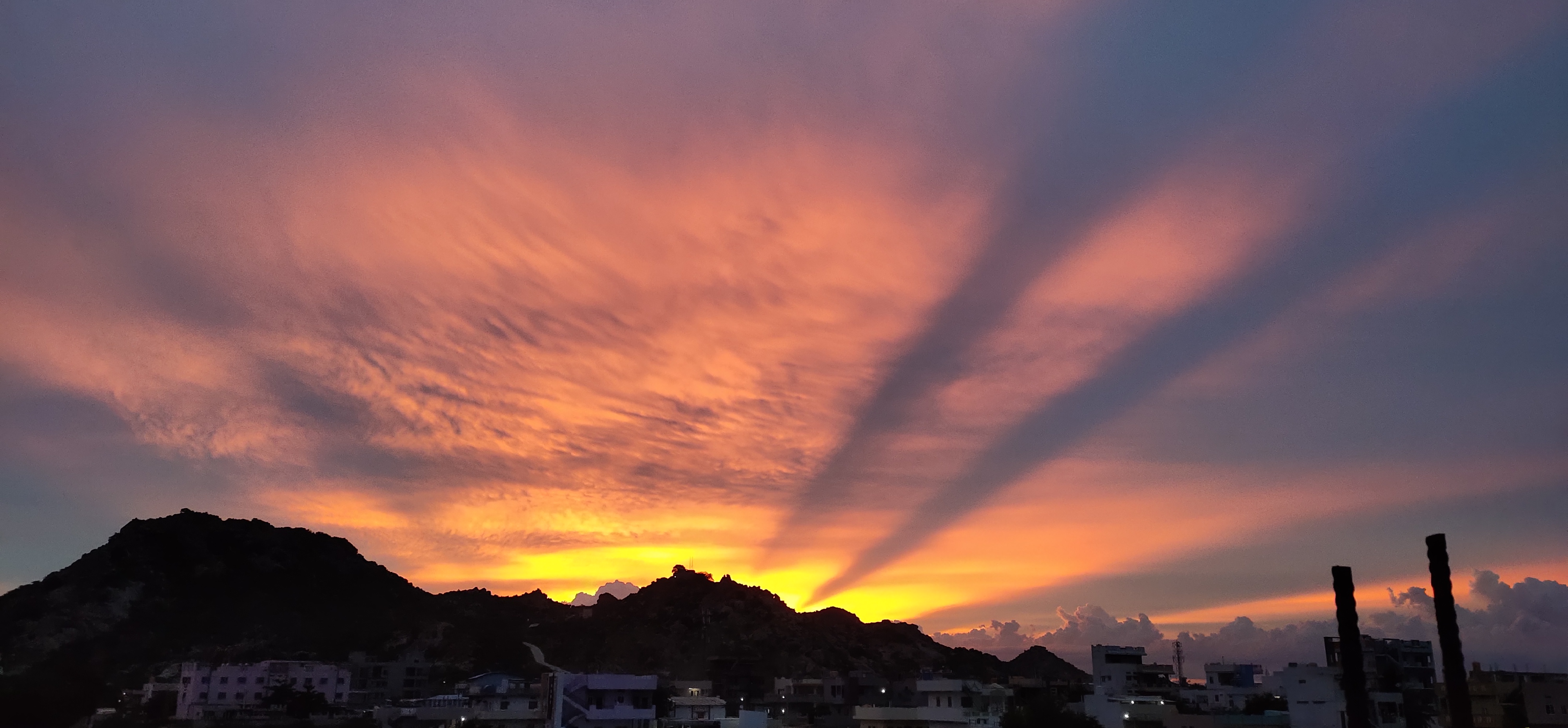
Maski sunset view

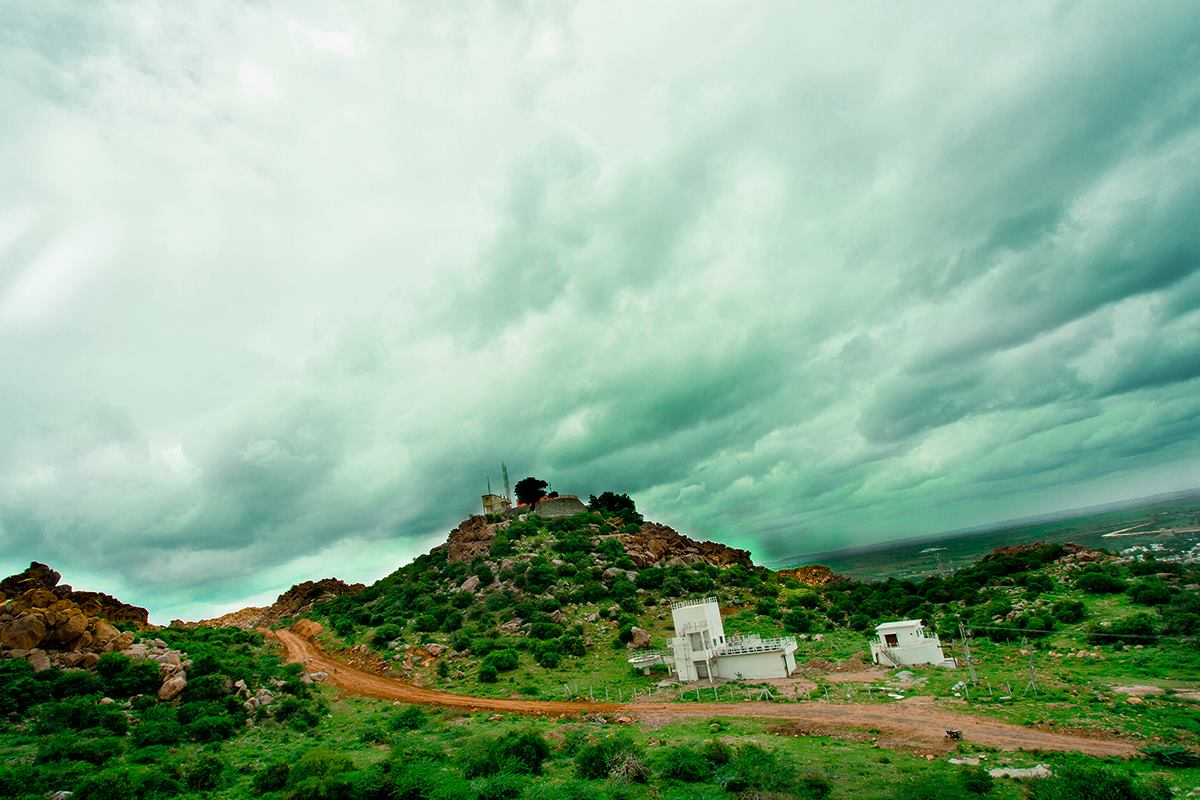
Maski Mallikarjun Temple

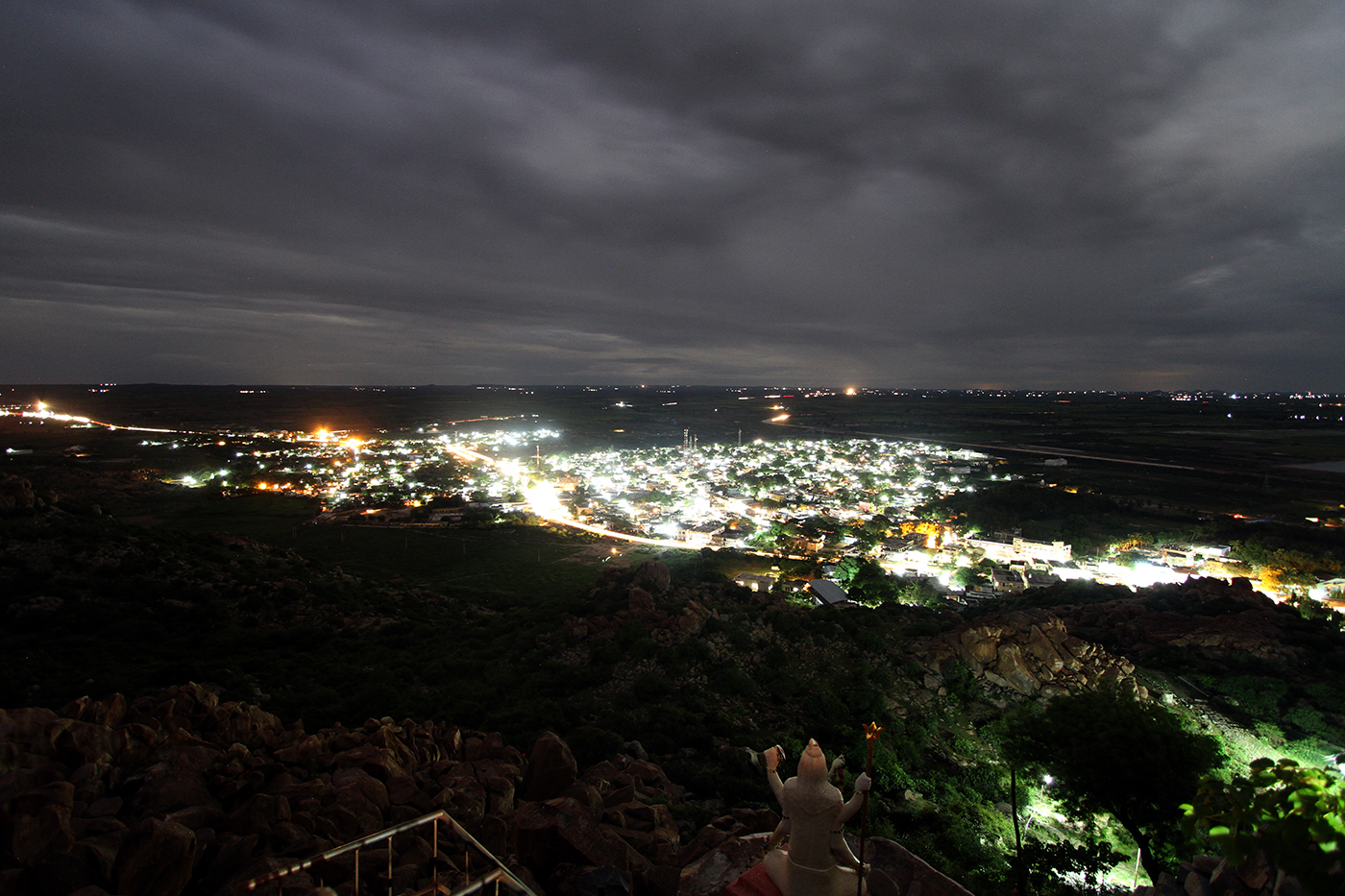
Maski at night

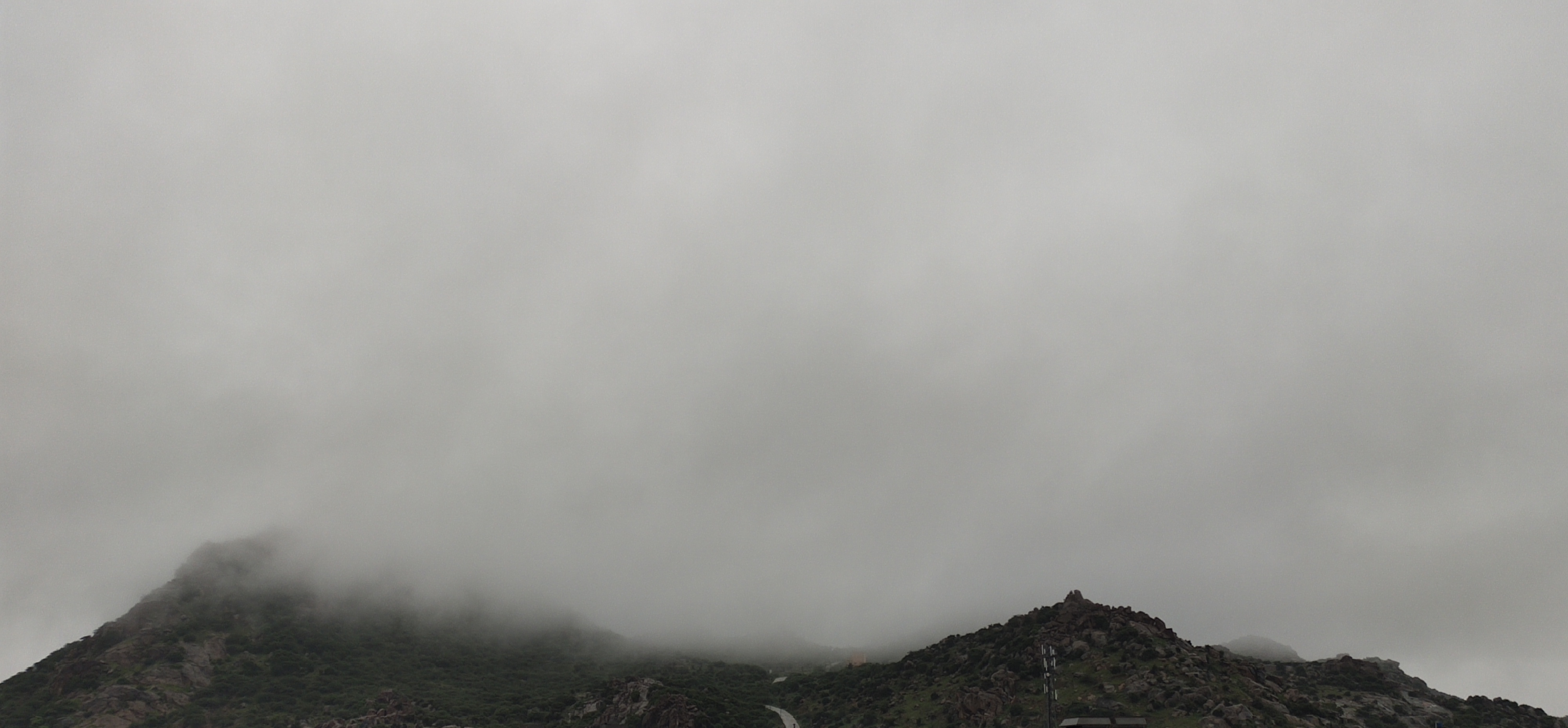
Maski in monsoon

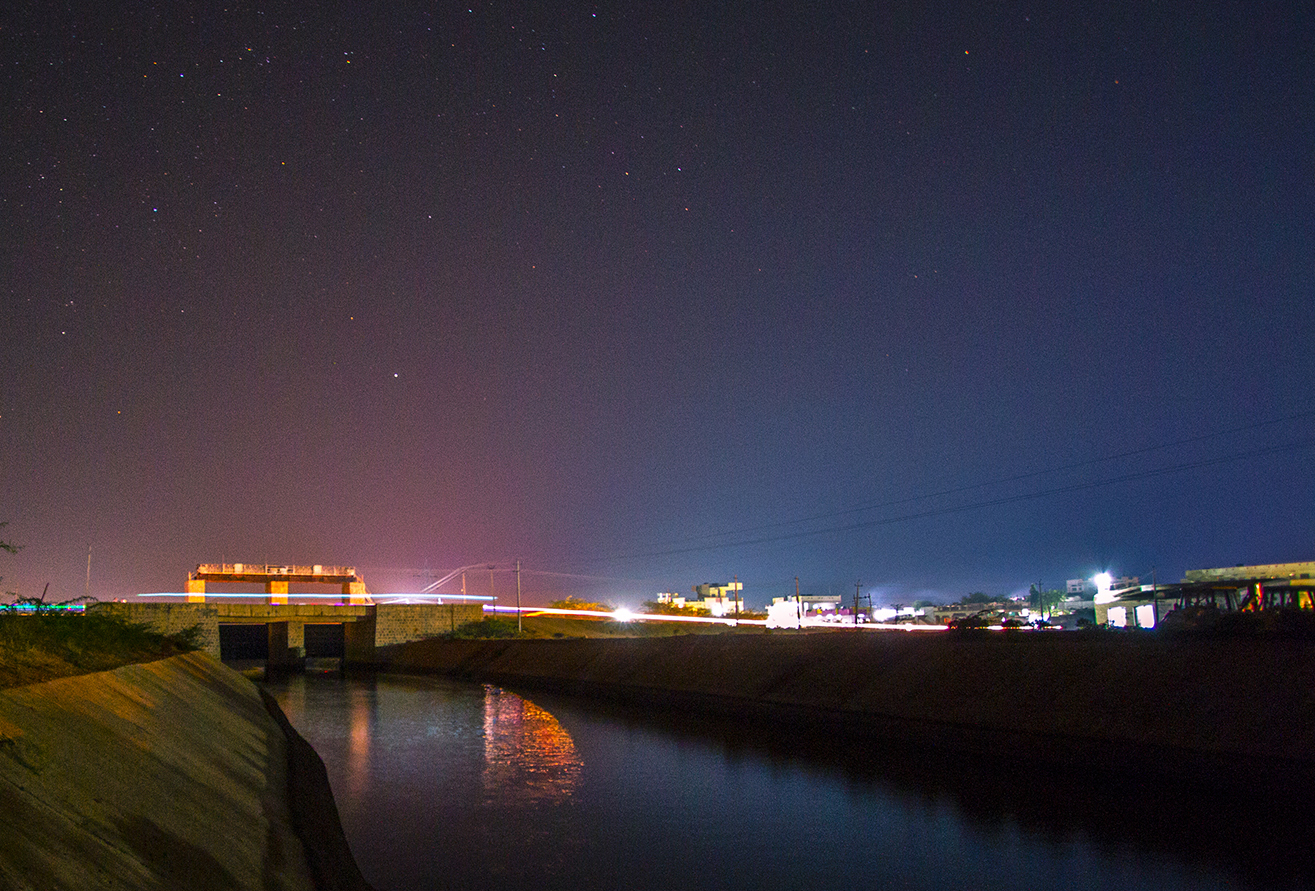
Maski canal view at night

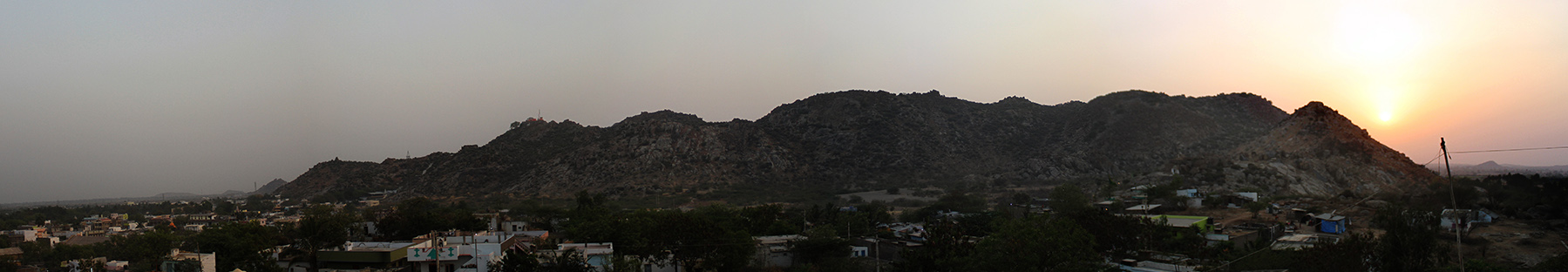
Maski panoramic view

== See also ==
- Hatti Gold Mines
- Mudgal
- Raichur
- Hampi
