= Jaladurga =

Village in Karnataka, India

- Village
- Krishna River at Jaladurga

- Location within Karnataka
- Coordinates: 16.254°N 76.421°E
- Country: India
- State: Karnataka
- District: Raichur district

Government
  - Type: Panchayat raj
  - Body: Gram panchayat

Languages
  - Official: Kannada
- Time zone: UTC+5:30 (IST)
- Telephone code: 08537
- ISO 3166 code: IN-KA
- Vehicle registration: KA-36
- Website: karnataka.gov.in

Jaladurga is a fortified village in Raichur district in the Indian state of Karnataka, about 20 km (12 mi) northeast of Lingsugur town. The Adil Shahi Kings of Bijapur built the fort.

== Jaladurga Fort Grand Canyon of Raichur ==
The Krishna River cascades down here and is known as the Jaladurga Falls.

This is a tourist destination in this region.

Jaladurga has the unique island Fort on a hill, literally means in Kannada fort on water. It is 13 km (8.1 mi) from Lingsugur, the Krishna River flows east side around the hill and the approach from surrounding areas is difficult and ideal place for a Fort. There were seven gates. Actually there are no particular record to prove that the fort was once a stronghold of the Adilshahis of Bijapur. The fort is in ruined status. on the top of the fort once had a palace and a cellar. There are a few tombs of the kings, no identification, there is Sangameshwara Matha, temple of Yellamma. The sides of the river Krishna is not sandy, it is full of smooth boulders and it is called as Mandhana Maduvu. At Jaladurga there is a small stone inscription written in Urdu and Devanagari script. Quilla is at one side, which used to watch enemies track. Also for punishment and all there was burza, which was in ruined nature. To go to Jajadurga, people will use Halabhavi route.

== Mythology ==
According to local belief, there is a box like stone hidden in the river, which contain a lakh of the verses of the great saint Basavanna and are hidden secret from the rest of the world.

== Jaladurga forest ==
There is a view point built by the forest department, it is under the Jaladurga reserve forest, the forest is home to wildlife, such as the fox, hyena, hare and mongoose.
