= Mudgal =

- Town
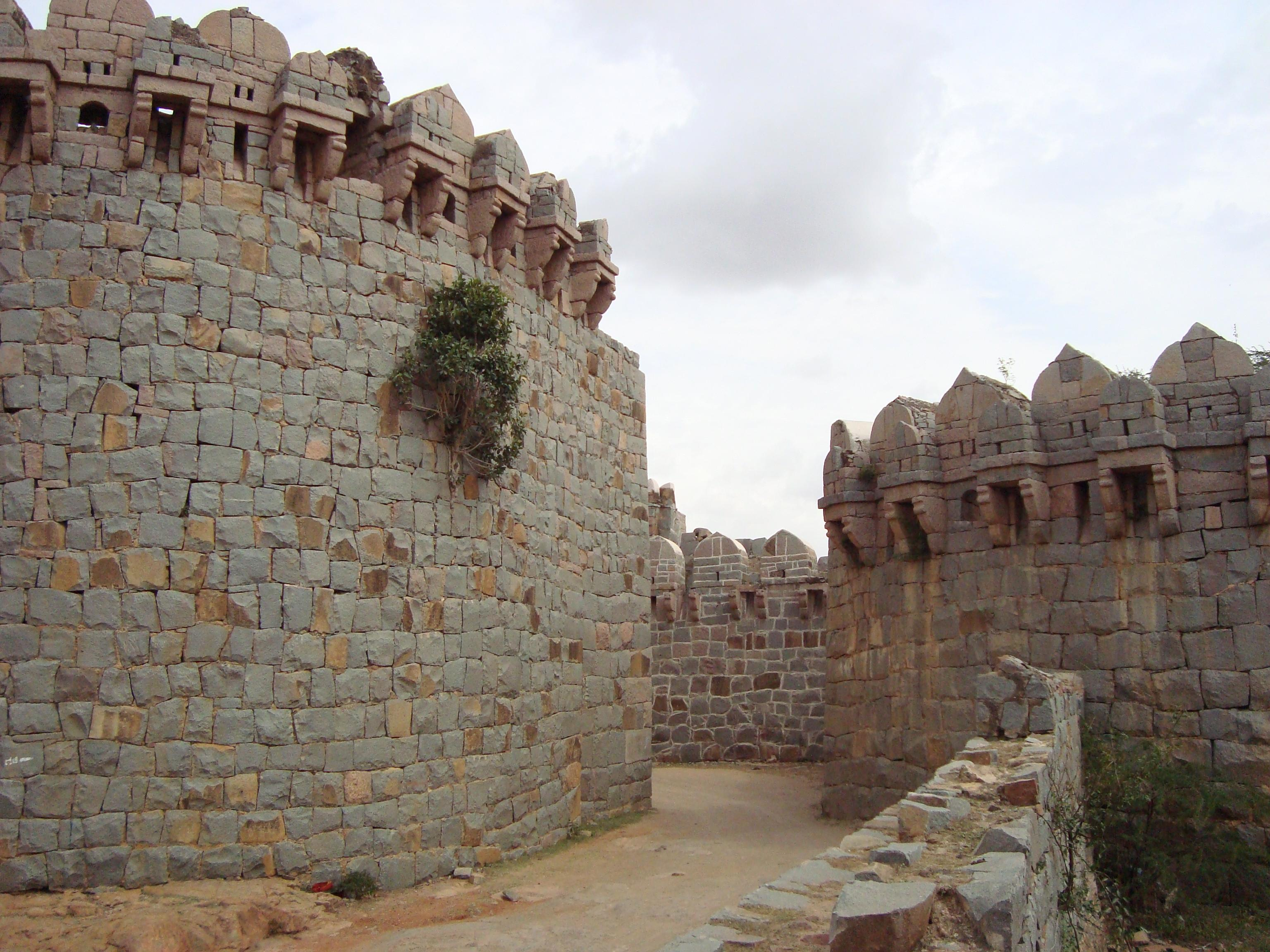
- Mudgal fort

- Location in Karnataka, India
- Coordinates: 16.02°N 76.43°E
- Country: India
- State: Karnataka
- District: Raichur
- Elevation: 549 m (1,801 ft)

Population (2001)
  - Total: 19,117

Languages
  - Official: Kannada
- Time zone: UTC+5:30 (IST)
- PIN: 584125
- Telephone code: 08537
- Vehicle registration: KA 36
- Website: raichur.nic.in/places.htm

Mudgal is a Municipal town in Lingsugur taluk, Raichur district in the Indian state of Karnataka. Mudgal is about 10 miles south-west of Lingsugur.

Mudgal has several inscriptions belonging to the Seuna Yadavas of Devagiri. It is known for its historical heritage and communal harmony. The main attractions here are the remnants of the Mudgal fort and an ancient Roman Catholic church built by the Jesuits before 1557.

There are ancient temples of Aswathhanarayana, Venkatesha, Narasimha and Didderayah.

== History ==
Mudgal's existence dates back to Neolithic era. Rishi Mudgal is also known as Lord Ganesha's teacher. Mudgal is one of the most important places of historical interest. Mudgal or Mudugal has a history dating back to the Seuna Yadavas of Devagiri, several inscriptions of which have been discovered in and around the town. In 11th century Mudgal was an educational centre for the students of various parts of the country. In the beginning of the 14th century, it was an important outpost of the Kakatiya kingdom. Ala-ud-din Bahman Shah, after seizing Devagiri, captured Mudgal along with Raichur. Some recent controversy regarding the original name of Mudgal had arisen by many Historians claiming that it was actually called "Al-Madaggal" during the Bahmani Sultanate era meaning "Place which has been agriculturally cultivated" in Arabic since the Bahmani Turks were predominantly Turko-Arab. After the establishment of the Bahmani Dynasty, the Bijapur kings took possession of the western and southern parts of the territory of the Bahmani kingdom including the forts of Raichur and Mudgal. During 16th century Mudgal was ruled by Vijayanagar Empire. Many battles were fought between Vijayanagar suratrana and Bahmani sultans.

== Places of interest ==
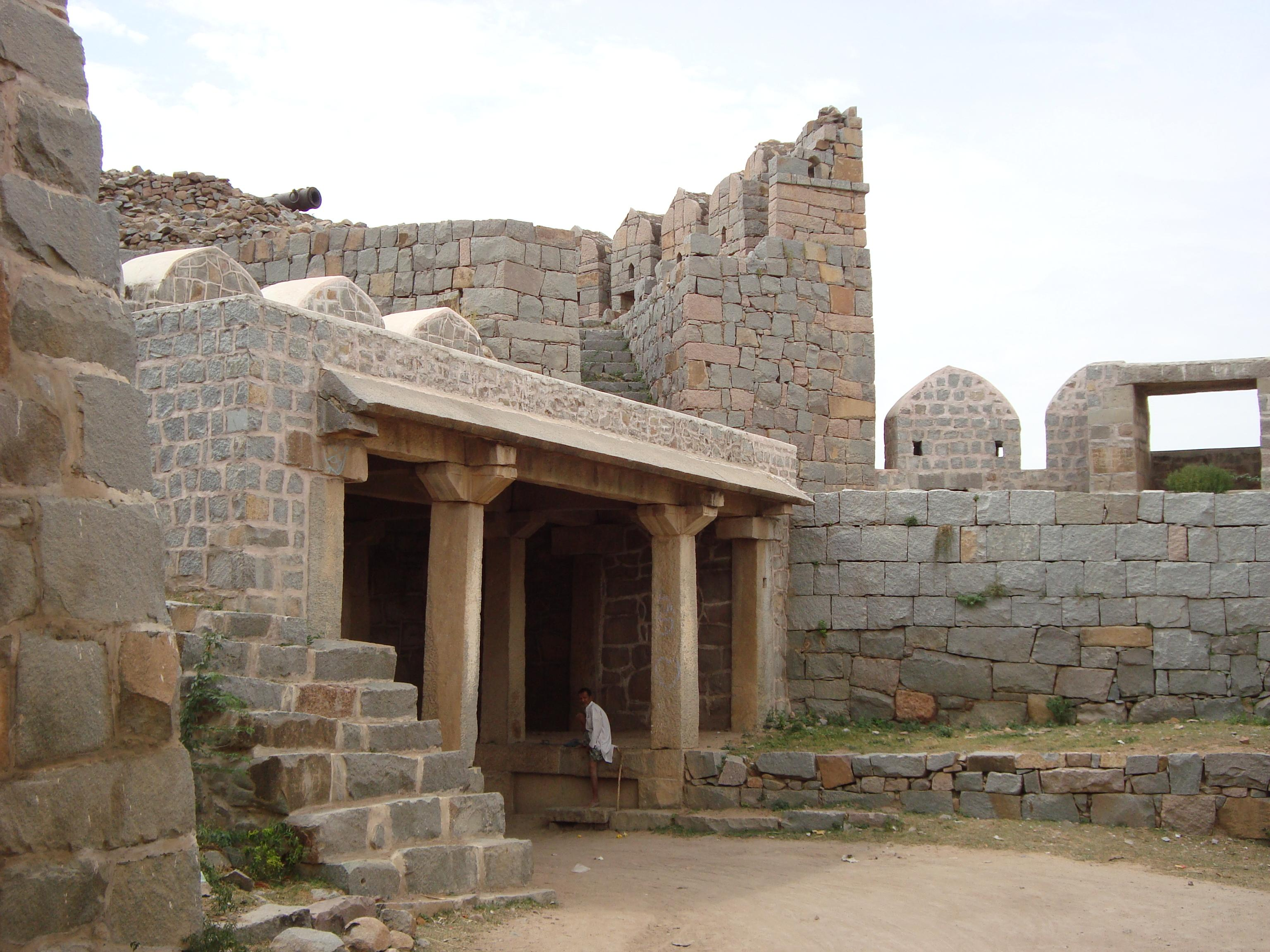
Mudgal fort.

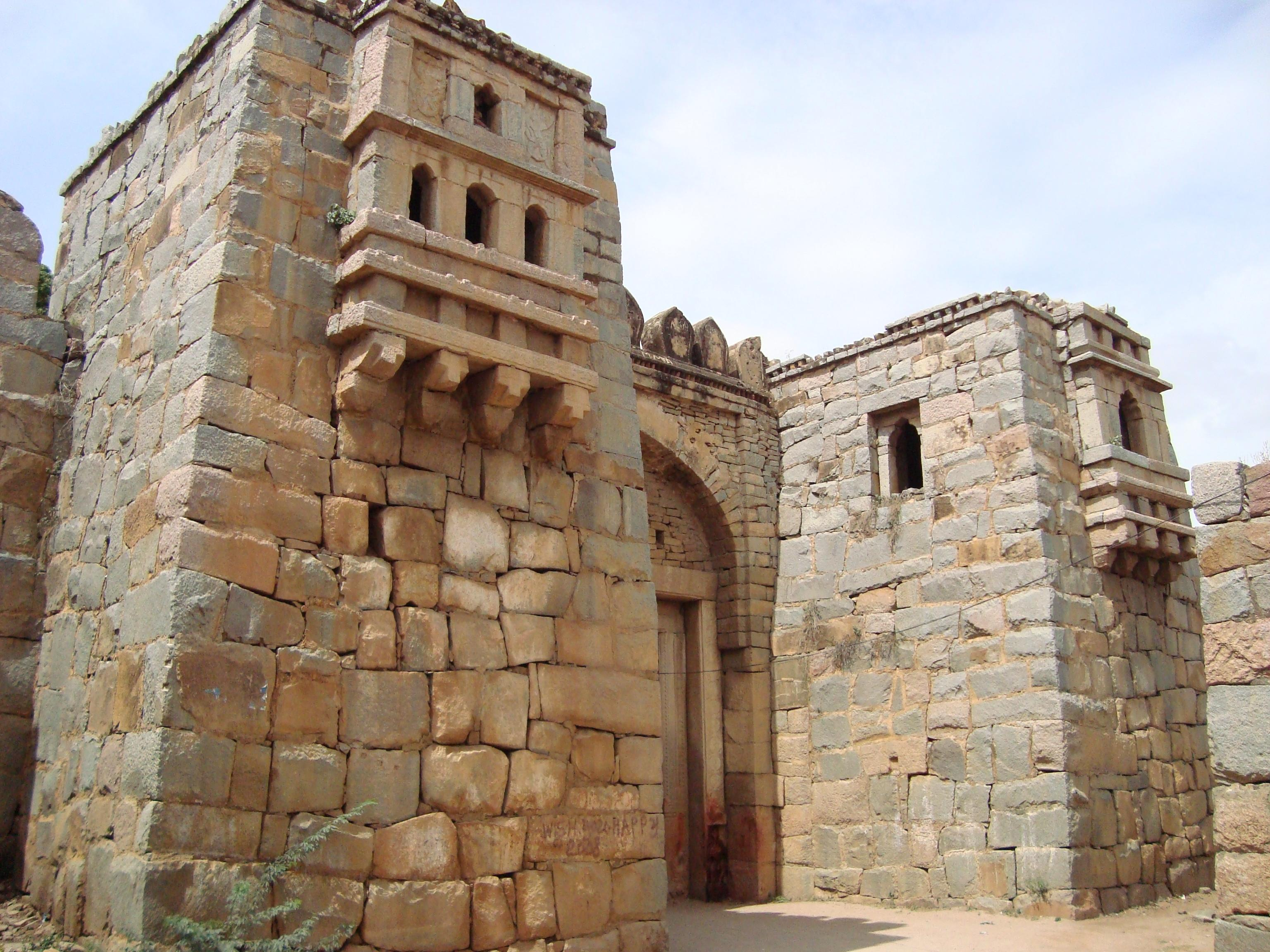
Mudgal fort.

The most important place of interest at Mudgal is the fort. In the construction of the fort at Mudgal, advantage was taken of a hillock on the top of which were built houses of the royalty and a wall with bastions. The outer fortifications of Mudgal cover an area of half a square mile. The outer fort has a wide moat, which is filled with water. The width of the moat varies, being as much as 50 yards at several places. Behind the moat, there is a scarp with a row of bastions and after that, a narrow covered passage and adjoining it the counter scarp with very massive bastions. From the arrangement of the existing fort, it is apparent that the fort was rebuilt after the invention of guns. The courses of masonry at several places are of Hindu style, but the arch-shaped parapet is of Muslim design. The moat and the row of bastions together offer a pleasing view.

In front of the Fateh Darwaza, which faces north, there is a very massive bastion, with a curtain on each side, thus making a barbican for the defence of the fort. Near this barbican is a guard's room with three arched openings towards the north. The barbican has a narrow court with entrances towards the west and north-east, the gates of which are built in the pillar-and-lintel style. In the covered passage of this gateway, there are guards’ rooms on both sides. The massive bastion above referred to has a gun with a Kannada inscription near the muzzle. The gun has long iron pieces in its interior, which have been bound outwardly by hoops.

There is another gateway on the western side, behind the narrow passage of which there is a second gateway with an arch. The walls at this point are cyclopean in construction. There are guards’ rooms on either side of the passage of this gateway also. There is a third gateway to the left of the second, also arched, but the apex, as in the case of the previous one, is filled up with masonry. This gateway is more massive in construction than the other two, the guard's room attached to its passage also being more commodious. There is a mosque near this gateway, which consists of a double-pillared hall, the pillars being of Hindu design. On the opposite side of the road are the remains of the Naubat Khana. On the way to the Bala Hisar is the gunpowder magazine, where, at one end, two compartments have been built for the storage of gunpowder.

== Demographics ==
According to the 2001 census of India, Mudgal had a population of 19,117. Males constitute 51% of the population and females 49%. Mudgal has an average literacy rate of 52%, lower than the national average of 59.5%: male literacy is 62%, and female literacy is 41%.

== Transport ==
Mudgal is well connected by road to Bangalore, Hubli, Hyderabad, Pune, Panaji, Bagalkot and other major cities. The nearest major airport is in Hyderabad.

=== Long-distance bus routes ===
Karnataka State Road Transport Corporation (KSRTC) runs a bus service to other cities and villages. There are also various private bus services.

=== Railways ===
Raichur is the nearest railway stations to Mudgal. Raichur is served by a major rail line and is well connected by trains to all major parts of India such as Bangalore, Mumbai, Delhi, Chennai, Hyderabad, Ahmedabad, Trivandrum, Kanyakumari, Pune, Bhopal and Agra.

Recently a railway project was inaugurated to connect Wadi Junction railway station in Kalaburagi district to Gadag Junction; as a result Mudgal and Lingsugur will be connected via rail.

=== Airways ===
Rajiv Gandhi International Airport, Hyderabad is nearest International Airport from Mudgal and Gulbarga Airport in Gulbarga is the nearest Domestic Airport from Mudgal

== See also ==
- Tourism in North Karnataka
- North Karnataka
- Kudalasangama
- Badami
- Pattadakal
- Aihole
- Mahakuta
- Kuknur
- Mahadeva Temple (Itagi)
- Gajendragad
- Sudi
- Deva Raya II
