= Lingasugur =

Lingasugur Chavani
- Town
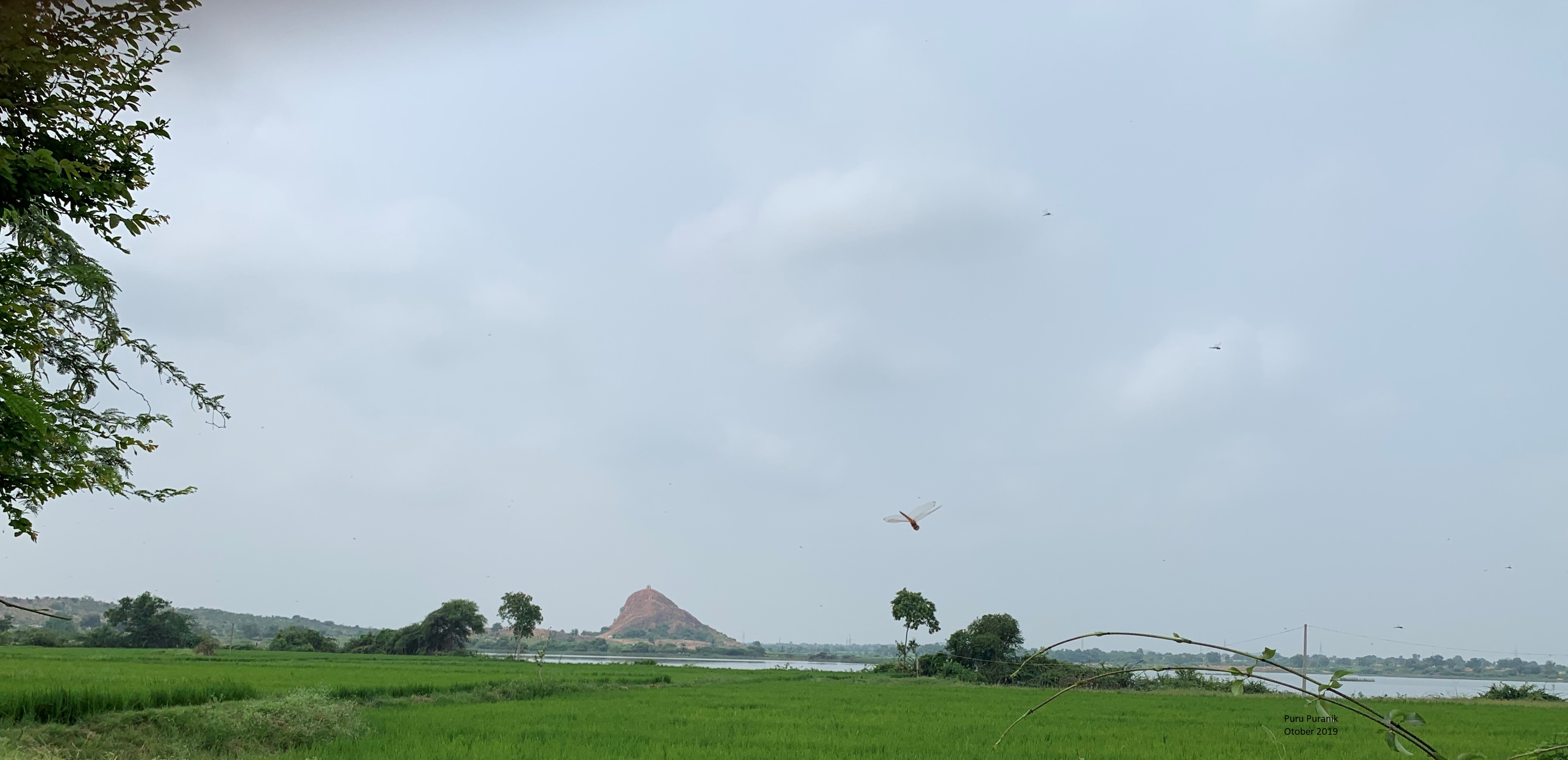

- Location in Karnataka, India
- Coordinates: 16.17°N 76.52°E
- Country: India
- State: Karnataka
- District: Raichur
- Lok Sabha Constituency: Raichur
- Elevation: 499 m (1,637 ft)

Population (2011)
  - Total: 34,932

Languages
  - Official: Kannada
- Time zone: UTC+5:30 (IST)
- PIN: 584122
- Telephone code: 08537
- Vehicle registration: KA 36
- Website: www.lingasugurtown.gov.in

Lingasugur, also pronounced as Lingasugūru, is a municipal town in Raichur district in the Indian state of Karnataka. There are many Temples, hills and forts (Quila). The festivals of Muharram and Maha Shivaratri are important here. Mudgal in Lingasugur taluk has a very ancient fort. It has often been mentioned in the autobiography of Philip Meadows Taylor. Lingasugur, then known as Chavani was the site of a major British cantonment in the region.

== History ==
The town of Lingasugur grew from the Karadakal during the colonial era. Early medieval inscriptions have been discovered from nearby Karadakal and Yardona dating from Rashtrakuta period. The place then was known as Kardikalnadu (Karadakal), headquarter of region with 300 villages under its control. During the late 12th century, the headquarter was shifted to From Karadkal to Mudgal and hence this place lost its eminence, only to be revived in the 19th century. A cantonment site was built 1 mile east of the Karadkal, 2 mile north of the Kasbahlingasugur by the British. The region was under the dominion of Nizam of Hyderabad until 1948. Lingasugur was made a district for about 25 years in the late 19th century. The present day Koppal district, Sindhanur, Shorapur, and Shahapur taluks came under its jurisdiction. In 1905, the district was abolished and parts of it transferred to Raichur and Gulbarga districts.

== Demographics ==
As of 2001 India census, Lingasugur had a population of 34932(as per2011 census) Males constitute 51% of the population and females 49%. Lingasugur has an average literacy rate of 60%, lower than the national average of 74.04%: male literacy is 65%, and female literacy is 45%. In Lingasugur, 16% of the population is under 6 years of age.

== Tourism ==
- KaradakalBillamaraja Castle
- karadakal kere Built in the 12th century. old name (Billamaraja Lake)Built to quench the thirst of for agricultural activities and livestock. The city's main attraction is.
- Maski is a town and an archaeological site. The site has an edict of Emperor Ashoka and it was the first edict of Emperor Ashoka that contained the name Asoka in it instead of the earlier edicts that referred him as Devanampriya
- Mudgal The main attractions Mudgal are the remnants of the Mudgal fort and an ancient Roman Catholic church built by the Jesuits before 1557.
- Hatti Gold Mines This mine is probably one of the most ancient metal mines in the world, dating to the Pre-Ashokan period. It is the only functioning Gold mine in India.
- Jaladurga is a fortified village. It is situated on an island formed by the Krishna River, 20 km northeast of Lingasugur town. The Adil Shahi Kings of Bijapur built the fort. The scenic view of river valley during sunset attracts the visitors.
- Piklihal is a pre-historic site belonging to the Neolithic period which is located 5 km south to Mudgal.
- Mudval There is a stone wall in the village of historical importance. Gold crushers and Iron slags found in the hill near to the Mudval village have proved that it is a prehistoric site.
- Venkatapura near Maski is a site where 45 Cairns have been excavated in good condition.
- Eachanal is an important village in the taluk with lush vegetation, surrounded by water and with a Shree Gaddemma Devi temple.
- Narayanpura is a village with the famous dam could Narayanpura Dam. It is also a power plant of electricity, constructed on Krishna River.

== Transport ==
Lingasugur is well connected by road to Bangaluru, Kalaburgi, Raichur, Hyderabad and Hubballi other major cities. The nearest major airport is in Hyderabad.

=== Long-distance bus routes ===
Kalyana Karnataka Road Transport Corporation (KKRTC) runs bus services to other cities and villages. There are also various private bus services.

=== Railways ===
Raichur is the nearest railway station to Lingasugur and Raichur is served by a major rail line and is well connected by trains to all major parts of India such as Bangaluru, Mumbai, Delhi, Chennai, Hyderabad, Ahmedabad, Trivandrum, Kanyakumari, Pune, Bhopal and Agra. There is a plan for Gadag-Wadi railway line . As of the proposed railway line kushtagi, Mudgal, Lingasugur, Gurugunta, Shorapur and Shahpur would get Railway station
