= Raichur district =

- District of Karnataka
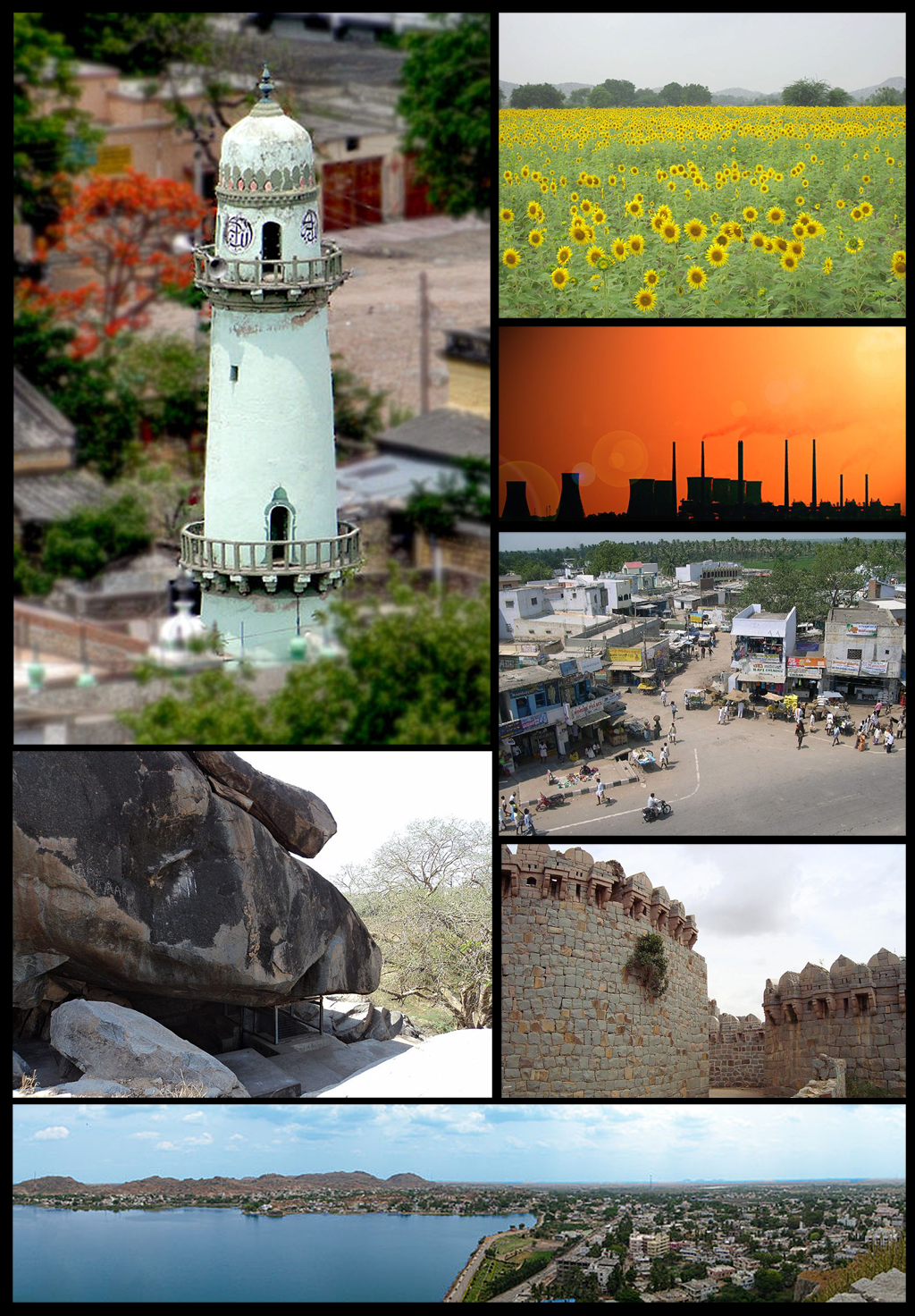
- Raichur district montage Clockwise from top left:Ek Minar Masjid in Raichur, Sunflower fields near Buddinni, Raichur Thermal Power Station, Channamma Circle Sindhanur, Mudgal fort, Mavina kere(lake) in Raichur, outer view of Rock edicts of Ashoka at Maski.

- Location in Karnataka
- Raichur district
- Coordinates: 16.21°N 77.35°E
- Country: India
- State: Karnataka
- Division: Gulbarga
- Headquarters: Raichur
- Talukas: Raichur, Sindhanur, Lingsugur, Manvi, Devadurga, Sirwar, Maski

Government
  - District collector: Poovitha(IAS)

Area^{†}
  - Total: 8,386 km^{2} (3,238 sq mi)
- Elevation: 400.0 m (1,312.3 ft)

Population (2011)
  - Total: 1,928,812
  - Density: 230.0/km^{2} (595.7/sq mi)

Languages
  - Official: Kannada
- Time zone: UTC+5:30 (IST)
- PIN: 584101,584102,584103
- Telephone code: 08532
- ISO 3166 code: IN-KA-RA
- Vehicle registration: KA-36
- Sex ratio: 0.983 ♂/♀
- Literacy: 48.8%
- Lok Sabha constituency: Raichur Lok Sabha constituency
- Precipitation: 680.6 millimetres (26.80 in)
- Website: raichur.nic.in

Raichur District is an administrative division of the Indian state of Karnataka. Located in the northeastern part of the state, it is bounded by Yadgir District to the north; Vijayapura (Bijapur) and Bagalkot districts to the northwest; Koppal District to the west, Ballary District to the south; and the Jogulamba Gadwal District of Telangana and Kurnool District of Andhra Pradesh to the east.

== Geography ==
The district is bounded by the Krishna River to the north and the Tungabhadra River to the south. The wedge of land between the rivers is known as the Raichur Doab, named after the city of Raichur. Vijayapura and Yadgir districts lie to the north across the Krishna River while Bagalkot and Koppal districts border to the west. Across the Tungabhadra River lies Ballary District of Karnataka to the southwest and Jogulamba Gadwal District of Telangana to the southeast. Kurnool District of Andhra Pradesh lies to the east and includes the lower portion of the Raichur Doab.

== History ==
The recorded history of the district is traced to as far back as the third century B.C. The fact that three minor rock edicts of Ashoka are found in this district one at Maski in the Lingasugur taluk and the other two near Koppal, prove that this area was included in the dominions of the great Mauryan king Ashoka (273 - 236 B.C.). At that time, this region was under the governance of the Viceroy or Mahamatra of Ashoka. Early in the Christian era, the district appears to have been a part of the kingdom of the Satavahanas. The Vakatakas, who reigned during the 3rd and 4th centuries A.D., seem to have held sway over Raichur for sometime, after which it appears to have been included in the Kadamba dominions. The next dynasty of importance, which ruled over this region, was that of the Chalukyas of Badami. According to an inscription from Aihole, Pulakeshin II having defeated the Pallavas, occupied this area and made it a province in his empire under the governance of his son Adityavarma. Later the whole of the present Raichur district was included in the dominions of the Rashtrakutas, who rose to power in the eighth century, as could be gathered from the inscriptions of that period found in this district. According to an inscription from Manvi taluk, one Jagattunga, a subordinate ruler under the Rashtrakuta king Krishna-II, was ruling the province of Adedore Eradusavirapranta, i.e., the area constituting the present Raichur district. Nripatunga, a Rashtrakuta king, has described Koppal in his Kannada work, Kavirajamarga, as the great Kopananagara.

Numerous inscriptions of the Western Chalukyas, found in the various parts of the district, testify to the fact that this region was under their sway for a considerable length of time between the 10th and 12th centuries A.D. It is learnt from an inscription found at Naoli in Lingsugur taluk that during the reign of Chalukya Vikramaditya-V, the Adedore-pranta, i.e., the Raichur region, was being ruled by his younger brother Jagadekamalla-I. Another inscription from Maski describes the place as a capital and makes a reference to the reign of Jayasimha. There were, however, frequent wars between the Chola kings of the south and the Chalukyan kings of Kalyani (aka Western Chalukyas) for supremacy over the Raichur region and the territory had passed into the hands of the Cholas for a brief period. The Haihayas and Sindas also seem to have ruled some parts of this region for sometime. Later, after the fall of the Chalukyas, Raichur passed into the hands of the Kalachuris of Kalyani and later Sevna Yadava kings. Then came the Kakatiyas in the 13th century. From an inscription on the fort-wall of Raichur, referred to earlier, it is learn that the original fort was built by one Gona Ganna Reddy, a general of the Kakatiya queen Rudramma Devi of Warangal, in 1294 A.D., at the instance of the latter. Raichur was sacked by Malik Kafur, was commander of Sultanate of Delhi in 1312.

Raichur district was passed to Vijayanagara Empire in 1323 after the demise of the Kakatiyas due to invasions of the Sultanate of Delhi. It was captured by the Bahmani Sultanate in 1363. It was passed to the Bijapur Sultanate in 1489 after the fragmentation of the Bahmanids. Vijayanagara recaptured it after the Battle of Raichur in 1520, but Bijapur recaptured it in 1565 after Vijayanagara's defeat at hands of Deccan Sultanates during the Battle of Talikota. Aurangzeb, emperor of Mughal Empire, captured the district in 1686. Finally, Raichur became part of the Nizam of Hyderabad between 1724 and 1948 except when it was under British Empire rule between 1853 and 1860 as part of Madras Presidency. During Nizam rule it was part of Gulbarga Division.

After Operation Polo, Hyderabad State was integrated into the Indian Union on 17 September 1948. Between 1948 and 1956, it was part of Hyderabad State. During the division of the state on a linguistic basis, it became part of Mysore State and later was renamed at Karnataka.

== Demographics ==
Historical population
Year	Pop.	±% p.a.
1901	446,375	—
1911	479,298	+0.71%
1921	433,341	−1.00%
1931	453,788	+0.46%
1941	500,719	+0.99%
1951	531,540	+0.60%
1961	634,097	+1.78%
1971	803,812	+2.40%
1981	1,035,600	+2.57%
1991	1,351,809	+2.70%
2001	1,669,762	+2.13%
2011	1,928,812	+1.45%

Religion in Raichur district (2011)
Hinduism	84.72%
Islam	14.10%
Christianity	0.54%
Others	0.64%

According to the 2011 census Raichur district has a population of 1,928,812, roughly equal to the nation of Lesotho or the US state of West Virginia. This gives it a ranking of 246th in India (out of a total of 640). The district has a population density of 228 inhabitants per square kilometre (590/sq mi) . Its population growth rate over the decade 2001-2011 was 15.27%. Raichur has a sex ratio of 992 females for every 1000 males, and a literacy rate of 60.46%. 25.42% of the population lives in urban areas. Scheduled Castes and Scheduled Tribes make up 20.79% and 19.03% of the population respectively.

Languages of Raichur district (2011)
1. Kannada (74.9%)
2. Urdu (11.6%)
3. Telugu (8.11%)
4. Lambadi (1.79%)
5. Hindi (1.75%)
6. Others (1.91%)

According to the 2011 census, 86.87% of the population spoke Kannada, 8.11% Telugu, 1.79% Lambadi and 1.75% Hindi as their first language.

== Administration ==
Raichuru District has seven taluks:

- Raichuru
- Devadurga
- Sindhanur
- Manvi
- Maski
- Sirwar
- Lingsuguru

The capital of the district is the city of Raichur, which is 409 km from the state capital, Bengaluru.

== Tourism ==
Among the historical attractions in the district is the Raichur Fort, built in 1294. Also notable is the nearby town of Anegundi, which has a number of monuments from the Vijayanagara empire, including the Ranganatha temple, Pampa Lake and Kamal Mahal,

MahaLaxmi Temple is located in a nearby village, Kallur, at a distance of 20 km from Raichur.

- Shaktinagar Sri Sugureshwara Temple (Lord Veerabadhra) at the bank of river Krishna, about 18 km from Raichur. Both temples are easily accessible at all times via bus routes.
- Maski is a town and an archaeological site. The site has an edict of Emperor Ashoka and it was the first edict of Emperor Ashoka that contained the name Ashoka in it instead of the earlier edicts that referred him as Devanampiye piyadasi.
- Mudgal The main attractions Mudgal are the remnants of the Mudgal fort and an ancient Roman Catholic church built by the Jesuits before 1557.
- Hatti Gold Mines This mine is probably one of the most ancient metal mines in the world, dating to the Pre-Ashokan period. It is the only functioning Gold mine in India.
- Naradagadde is a holy place where Lord Narada is believed to have performed penance. Naradagadde and Koormagadde are islands famous the temples and are located on Krishna River.
- Jaladurga is a fortified village. The Adil Shahi Kings of Bijapur built the fort.
- Piklihal is a pre-historic site belonging to the Neolithic period located 5 km south to Mudgal.
- Kallur archaeological site is a Copper Hoard culture site in Manvi taluk of Raichur. Kallur archaeological site is 30 km from Raichur.

== Economy ==
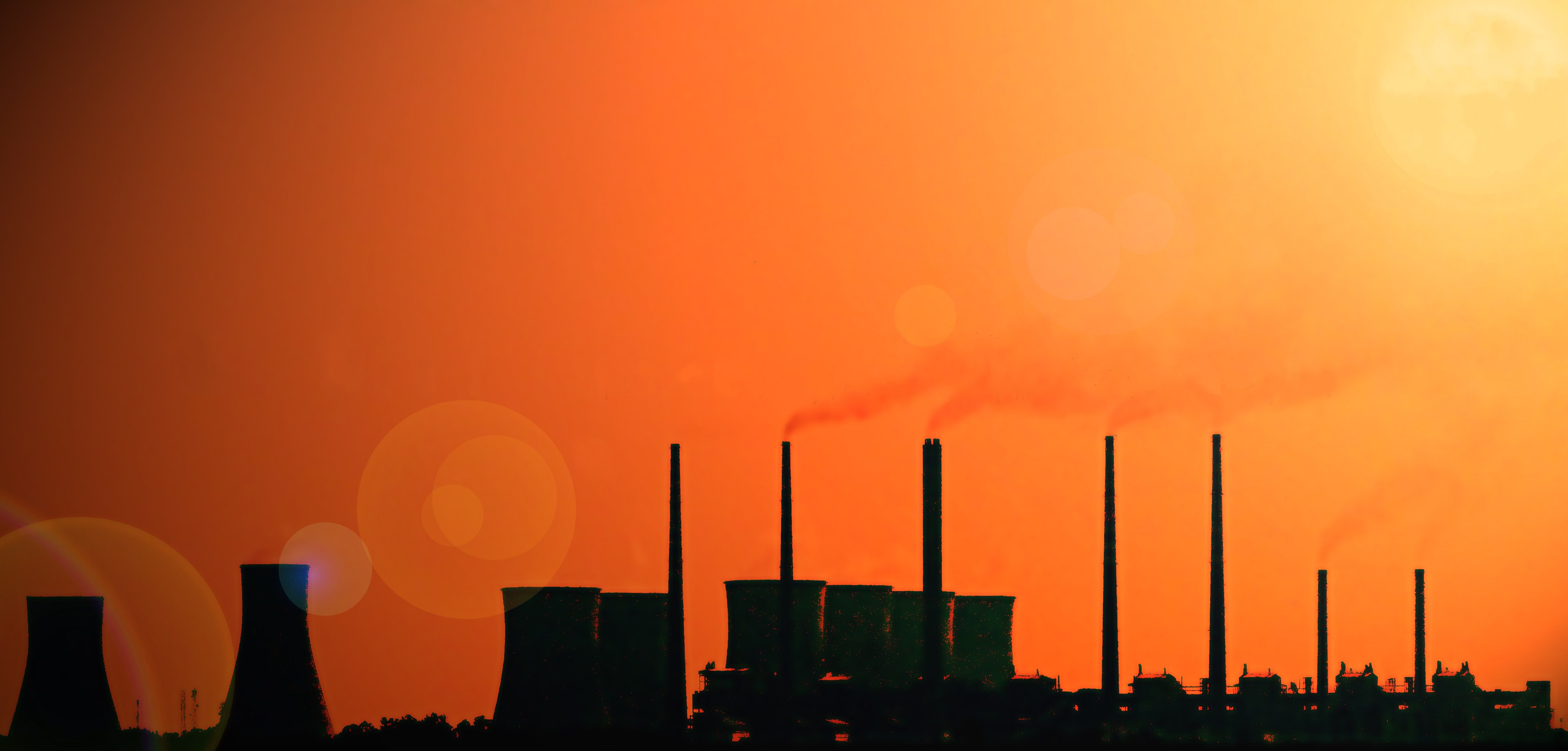
Raichur Thermal Power Station

The Raichur Thermal Power Station at Shaktinagar and Yaramaras Thermal Power Station at Yaramaras, generate electricity for Karnataka.

Raichur District is one of few places in India with gold resources. Hatti Gold Mines are situated in Raichur District, around 90 km away from Raichur city. All the five talukas mentioned above are well irrigated, with water from the Tungabhadra Dam on the Tungabhadra River, and the Narayanpura Dam on the Krishna River. Raichur is known for its paddy fields and its rice, which is exported to different countries. It also has a good trading market in cotton industry.

Raichur is one of the highest paddy growing districts in the State. It has also earned the tag of Rice Bowl of Karnataka

In 2006 the Ministry of Panchayati Raj named Raichur one of the country's 250 most backward districts (out of a total of 640 districts). It is one of the five districts in Karnataka currently receiving funds from the Backward Regions Grant Fund Programme (BRGF) and that is going to local politicians home.

== Notable people ==
=== Academia ===
- S. A. Choudum - professor and former chair of the department of mathematics, IIT Madras
- Abdul Samad Siddiqui - Indian educationist

=== Arts and culture ===
- Pandit Narasimhalu Vadavati - clarinet musician
- Satyabodha Tirtha - 18th century philosopher
- Satyapriya Tirtha - 18th century philosopher
- Jayadevi Jangamshetti - Hindustani classical music singer
- Jagannatha Dasa - 18th century Kannada poet
- Vijaya Dasa - 18th century Kannada poet
- Gopala Dasa - 18th century Kannada poet

=== Entertainment ===
- S. S. Rajamouli - film director, directed Baahubali

=== Law ===
- Shivaraj Patil - retired judge, served as justice of Supreme Court of India

=== Religion ===
- Mohammad Badshah Qadri - Sufi saint

=== Sports ===
- Yere Goud - cricket player for Karnataka cricket team
- Vidyadhar Patil - cricket player, represented India U-19 national team at the 2020 under-19 world cup.
- Manoj Bhandage - cricket player, won 2025 Indian Premier League with Royal Challengers Bengaluru.

== See also ==
- Yadgir (Lok Sabha constituency)
- Raichur (Lok Sabha constituency)
