= Raichur =

Raichur Rāyachūru
- City
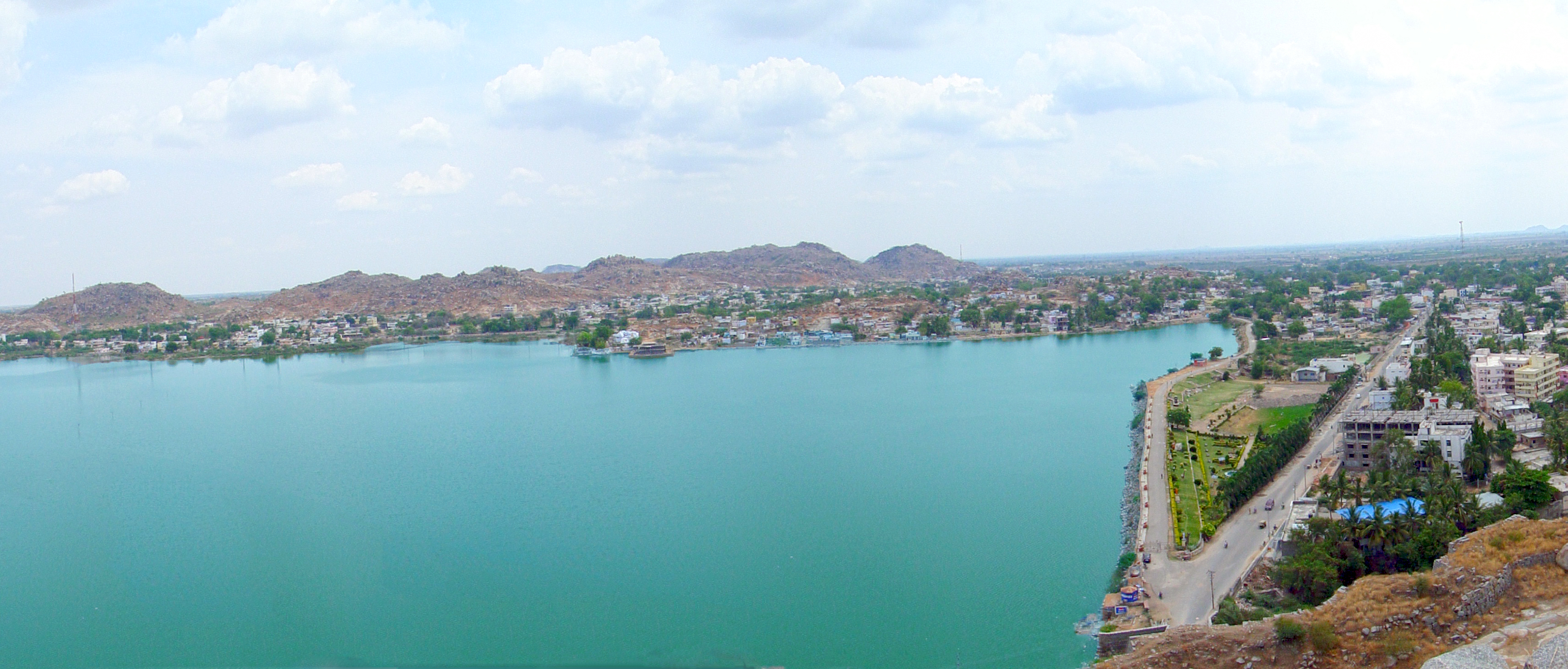
- Raichur City
- Nickname: Cotton City
- Raichur in Karnataka
- Coordinates: 16.2°N 77.37°E
- Country: India
- State: Karnataka
- District: Raichur
- Established: 3rd Century BC

Government
  - Body: Municipal council

Area
  - Total: 73.2 km^{2} (28.3 sq mi)
- Elevation: 407 m (1,335 ft)

Population (2011)
  - Total: 234,073
  - Rank: 189
  - Density: 3,200/km^{2} (8,280/sq mi)
- Demonyms: Rayachurinavaru; Rayachuriga (masculine); Rayachurathi (feminine); Raichurian
- Time zone: UTC+5:30 (IST)
- PIN: 584101-103
- Telephone code: 91 8532
- Vehicle registration: KA-36
- Official language: Kannada
- Website: raichurcity.mrc.gov.in

Raichur, also pronounced as Rāyachūru (formerly Raichore), is a city and headquarters of eponymous Raichur district in the Karnataka state of India. It is located between Krishna and Tungabhadra rivers.

== History ==
=== Ancient History ===
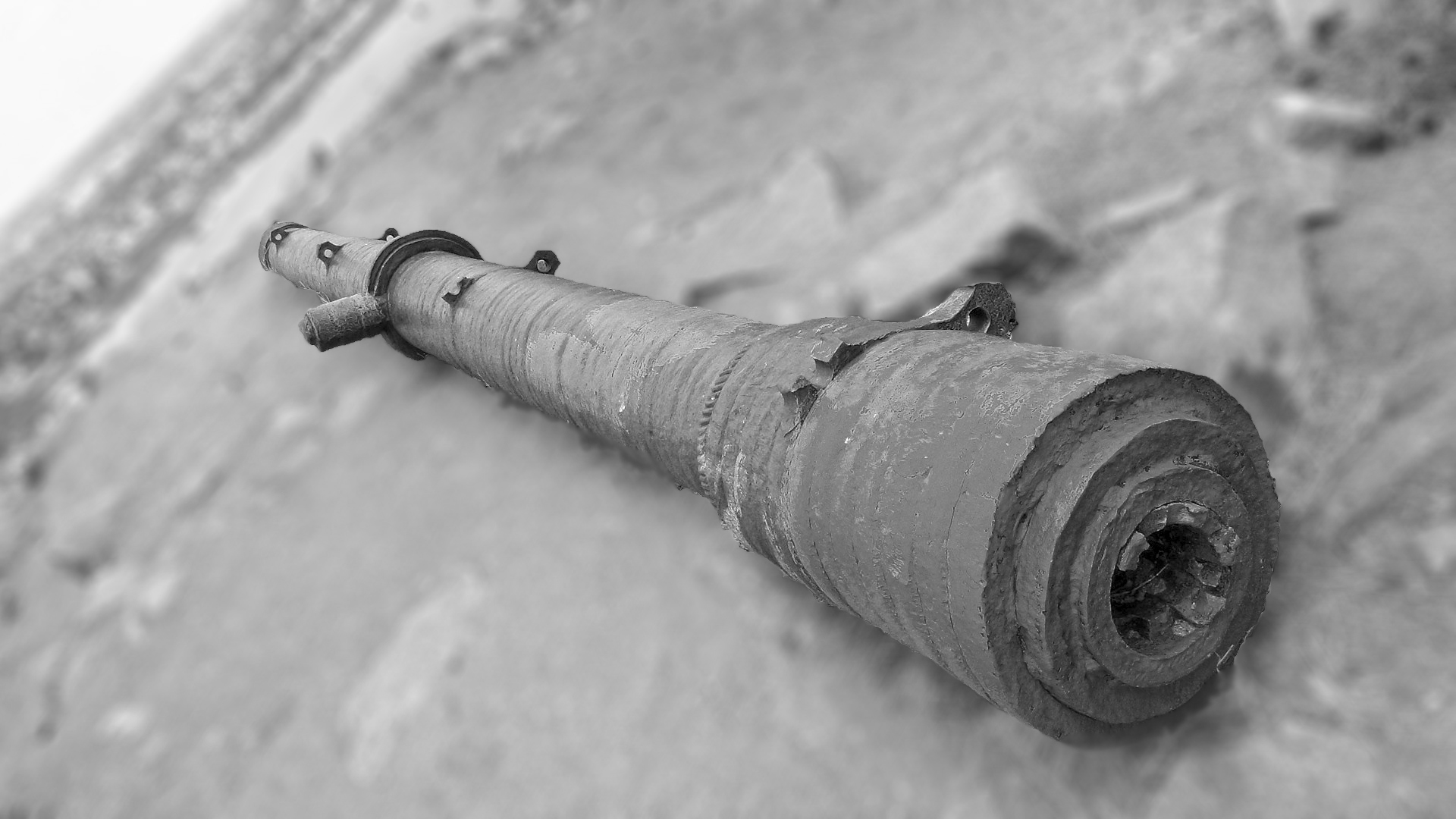
Iron Cannon On Hill Top Raichur

The recorded history of the district is traced as far back as the third century B.C.E. Three minor rock edicts of Ashoka are found in the district, one at Maski in the Lingasugur taluk and the other two near Koppal, which proves that this area was part of the dominions of the Mauryan emperor Ashoka. At that time, this region was under the governance of a Viceroy or Mahamatra of Ashoka. Thereafter, the district appears to have been a part of the kingdom of the Satavahanas. The Vakatakas, who reigned during the 3rd and 4th centuries CE, seems to have held sway over Raichur for some time, after which it appears to have been included in the Kadamba dominions. The next dynasty of importance, which ruled over this region, was that of the Chalukyas of Badami. According to an inscription from Aihole, Pulakeshin II having defeated the Pallavas, occupied this area and made it a province in his empire under the governance of his son Adityavarma. Later the whole of the present Raichur district was included in the dominions of the Rashtrakutas, who rose to power in the eighth century, as could be gathered from the inscriptions of that period found in this district. According to an inscription from Manvi taluk, Jagattunga, a subordinate ruler under the Rashtrakuta king Krishna-II, was ruling the province of Adedore Eradusavirapranta, i.e., the area constituting the present Raichur district. Amoghavarsha Nrupathunga I, a Rashtrakuta king, has described Koppal in his Kannada work, Kavirajamarga, as the great Kopananagara.

Raichur has a rich history, having been a part of various empires, such as the Bahmanis Sultanate, Vijayanagara, the Adil Shahi dynasty of Bijapur and nizam of hyderabad. The city is famous for its imposing Raichur Fort. Here, stone inscriptions have been found in Persian, Urdu, and Arabic which belonged to the bastion of the fort, referring to its construction in 1294. Among the ruins of the immense fort are many irrigation tanks and old temples. The fort was built by Kakatiya king Rudra in 1284 CE which passed on to the Vijayanagar kingdom after the decline of the Kakatiyas. Thereafter the fort was under dispute for nearly two centuries. It was captured by the Bahmanis in 1323 CE. Saluva Narasimha Deva Raya expressed a wish in his testament that the city of Raichur be recaptured. This had been in the mind of Krishnadevaraya since his coronation in 1509. In the year 1520 Krishnadevaraya sent Saeed Maraikar, a Muslim in his service, to Goa with a large sum of money to buy horses. Maraikar instead went to Adil Khan with the money and offered his services. Krishnadevaraya made a demand that Maraikar be returned along with the money which was duly refused. During the period of peace, Krishnadevaraya made extensive preparations for a grand attack on Raichur doab. After the court decided that Raichur should be attacked the king invited all commanders (Nayakas) in his service to take part in the battle.

Raichur is very rich from the epigraphical point of view. It has already yielded hundreds of inscriptions, ranging from the Mauryan period up to the end of the Muslim period. The inscriptions are in a variety of languages such as Sanskrit, Prakrit, Kannada, Telugu, Arabic, and Persian and belonging to almost all the dynasties that ruled over the Deccan. The most important places from this point of view are Maski, Koppal, Kuknur, Hatti Gold Mines, Mudgal, Lingsugur and Raichur.

=== Recent History ===
The District of Raichur was a part of the Hyderabad State until the re-organisation of State on 1 November 1956.

== Geography ==
Raichur is located at 16.2°N 77.37°E on the Deccan Plateau. It has an average elevation of 407 metres (1335 ft)

The summers are hot in this region with temperatures going beyond 40 °C. It receives rainfall during the months between May and August. Overall, the region is warm and humid during most part of the year.

Raichur District comprises 7 administrative sub-divisions, called "Taluks":

- Raichur District
- Sirwar Taluk
- Sindhanur Taluk
- Manvi Taluk
- Devadurga Taluk
- Maski Taluk
- Lingasugur Taluk

== Demographics ==
As of 2011 Indian census, Hinduism is majority religion in Raichur with 67.61% followers. Islam is second most popular religion in Raichur with approximately 29.87% following it. In Raichur, Christianity is followed by 1.18%, Jainism by 0.94%, Sikhism by 0.08% and Buddhism by 0.08%. Around 0.00% stated 'Other Religion', approximately 0.29% stated 'No Particular Religion'.

Religions in Raichur City (2011)
Religion	Percent
Hinduism	67.61%
Islam	29.87%
Christianity	1.18%
Jainism	0.94%
Other or not stated	0.40%

=== Languages ===
Languages of Raichur City (2011) Census
1. Kannada (49.9%)
2. Urdu (27.6%)
3. Telugu (14.8%)
4. Hindi (5.17%)
5. Marathi (1.69%)
6. Others (0.89%)

== Transport ==
=== Road ===
Raichur is well-connected by roads, prominently with the National Highway 167. With Panji-Hyderabad Highway and Surat–Chennai Expressway in development, the city could experience industrial growth.

=== Rail ===
Raichur Junction is an important railway junction for Mumbai–Chennai line. The city has railway connectivity with major cities of Bengaluru, Mumbai, Chennai, New Delhi, Tatanagar, Ahmedabad, Surat, Hyderabad, Mysore, Jaipur, Varanasi, Vijayawada, Mahbubnagar, Tirupati, Dwarka, Tirchy, Madurai, Thiruvananthapuram, Coimbatore, Jamu Tawi, Ludhiana, Ambala, Jalandhar, etc. The station is located primarily on the Solapur-Guntakal section as well as the later opened Mahabubnagar-Munirabad railway line.

=== Airport ===
The Raichur Airport has long been proposed to be built on an unpaved airstrip north of the city, post an emergency landing for Jawaharlal Nehru, the first prime minister of India, in 1957.

== Education ==
- Indian Institute of Information Technology, Raichur
- Raichur University, Raichur
- University of Agricultural Sciences, Raichur

== Climate ==
Climate data for Raichur (1991–2020, extremes 1901–2020)
Month	Jan	Feb	Mar	Apr	May	Jun	Jul	Aug	Sep	Oct	Nov	Dec	Year
Record high °C (°F)	38.4 (101.1)	40.5 (104.9)	44.6 (112.3)	44.0 (111.2)	45.6 (114.1)	44.0 (111.2)	39.4 (102.9)	37.0 (98.6)	38.4 (101.1)	37.6 (99.7)	38.1 (100.6)	38.4 (101.1)	45.6 (114.1)
Mean daily maximum °C (°F)	31.4 (88.5)	34.2 (93.6)	37.9 (100.2)	39.9 (103.8)	40.4 (104.7)	36.0 (96.8)	33.2 (91.8)	32.3 (90.1)	32.1 (89.8)	32.1 (89.8)	31.4 (88.5)	30.4 (86.7)	34.2 (93.6)
Mean daily minimum °C (°F)	16.8 (62.2)	18.8 (65.8)	22.1 (71.8)	24.8 (76.6)	25.5 (77.9)	23.9 (75.0)	23.0 (73.4)	22.7 (72.9)	22.1 (71.8)	21.4 (70.5)	18.9 (66.0)	16.4 (61.5)	21.3 (70.3)
Record low °C (°F)	7.1 (44.8)	11.0 (51.8)	13.0 (55.4)	16.1 (61.0)	15.4 (59.7)	16.1 (61.0)	17.0 (62.6)	16.3 (61.3)	16.4 (61.5)	13.5 (56.3)	8.5 (47.3)	7.3 (45.1)	7.1 (44.8)
Average rainfall mm (inches)	1.8 (0.07)	4.1 (0.16)	4.7 (0.19)	19.8 (0.78)	45.3 (1.78)	104.6 (4.12)	112.8 (4.44)	122.1 (4.81)	164.9 (6.49)	121.5 (4.78)	11.7 (0.46)	3.5 (0.14)	716.6 (28.21)
Average rainy days	0.3	0.3	0.3	1.3	2.7	6.1	7.6	7.7	8.6	5.4	1.2	0.2	41.6
Average relative humidity (%) (at 17:30 IST)	36	29	23	24	28	45	56	59	61	57	47	39	42
Source: India Meteorological Department

== See also ==
- Raichur Airport
