= State Highway 20 (Karnataka) =

Road in Karnataka, India

State Highway 20

Route information
- Maintained by KPWD
- Length: 354 km (220 mi)

Major junctions
- West end: Bachi, Belgaum
- East end: Raichur

Location
- Country: India
- State: Karnataka
- Districts: Belgaum, Bagalkot, Raichur
- Primary destinations: Bachi, Belgaum, Yargatti, Lokapur, Bagalkot, Hungund, Lingasugur, Raichur

Highway system
- Roads in India; Expressways; National; State; Asian; State Highways in Karnataka

Karnataka State Highway 20, commonly referred to as KA SH 20, is a normal state highway that runs west through Belgaum, Bagalkot, Raichur districts in the state of Karnataka. This state highway touches numerous cities and villages Viz.Hindalaga Jail, Sambra, Marihal, Nesargi, Yaragatti, Amingad, Nandavadgi, Mudgal, Kavital, Sirvar, Kalmala. The total length of the highway is 354 kilometres (220 mi).

== Route description ==
Many villages, cities and towns in various districts are connected by this state highway. The route followed by this highway is Bachi, Belgaum, Yeraghatti, Lokapur, Bagalkot, Hungund, Lingasugur, Raichur

== Major junctions ==
=== National Highways ===
- NH 4A at Belgaum city
- NH 4 at Belgaum
- NH 218 at Gaddanakeri

=== State Highways ===
- KA SH 31 at Nesargi
- KA SH 1 at Murgod
- KA SH 45 and KA SH 55 at Yaragatti
- KA SH 34 at Lokapur
- KA SH 53 at Kaladhagi
- KA SH 13 at Bagalkot
- KA SH 44 at Amingad
- KA SH 60 at Hungund
- KA SH 14 at Nagarhal
- KA SH 15 and KA SH 23 at Kalmala
