= Bagalwad =

Bagalwad Dwarawada
- Village
- Location within Karnataka Location within India
- Coordinates: 16°3′9.93″N 76°53′15.84″E
- Country: India
- State: Karnataka
- District: Raichur district
- Taluk: Sirwar

Population (2001)
  - Total: 7,543

Languages
  - Official: Kannada
- Time zone: UTC+5:30 (IST)
- PIN: 584 120
- Telephone code: 08534
- Vehicle registration: KA-36

Bagalwad also spelled as Bagalawada is a village near Kavital in the Sirwar taluk of Raichur district in the Indian state of Karnataka. It is located in the Sirwar taluk of Raichur district in Karnataka.

== Demographics ==
As of 2001 India census, Bagalwad had a population of 7543 with 3777 males and 3766 females.

== Food ==
The main food in the Bagalwad is rice, though rotti/khadak (crispy) rotti, sajje rotti, chapathi, curries, and spicy chicken dishes are also found. Crops such as paddy, corn, cotton, and pulses are grown.

== Local festivals ==
- Maharshi Valmiki Jayanti
- Kanakadasa Jayanti
- B. R. Ambedkar Jayanti
- Karnataka Rajyotsava
- Basava Jayanti
- Ugadi
- Navaratri

== See also ==
- Maski
- Watgal
- Kavital
- Manvi
- Raichur
