= Byagawat =

Byagawat Byagavat
- Village
- Location within Karnataka Location within India
- Coordinates: 15°59′48″N 76°53′49″E
- Country: India
- State: Karnataka
- District: Raichur district
- Taluk: Manvi

Population (2001)
  - Total: 6,185

Languages
  - Official: Kannada
- Time zone: UTC+5:30 (IST)
- Telephone code: 08538
- Vehicle registration: KA 36

Byagawat also spelled as Byagavat or Byagwat is a village in the Manvi taluk of Raichur district in the Indian state of Karnataka. Byagawat is located northwest to Manvi. Byagawat lies on the road connecting Manvi and Kavital. Great saint Sri Jagannatha Dasa lived in Byagawat.

== Demographics ==
As of the 2001 India census, Byagawat had a population of 6,185, with 3,080 males, 3,105 females and 1,156 households.

== See also ==
- Kalmala
- Devadurga
- Lingasugur
- Sindhanur
- Raichur
- Districts of Karnataka
