= Jambaladinni, Manvi =

Jambaladinni Jambaldinni
- Village
- Location within Karnataka Location within India
- Coordinates: 16°8′4″N 76°59′32″E
- Country: India
- State: Karnataka
- District: Raichur district
- Taluk: Manvi

Population (2001)
  - Total: 1,458

Languages
  - Official: Kannada
- Time zone: UTC+5:30 (IST)
- PIN: 584 129
- Telephone code: 08538
- Vehicle registration: KA 36

Jambaladinni near Sirwar is a village in the Manvi taluk of Raichur district in the Indian state of Karnataka. Jambaladiini is located northwest to Manvi town. Jambaladinni is 10 km from Sirwar, 14 km Manvi and 45 km from Raichur

== Demographics ==
As of 2001 India census, Jambaladinni had a population of 1,458 with 709 males and 749 females and 282 Households.

== Importance ==
Jambaladiini is the birthplace of the great Vachana exponent Sri Pandit Siddarama Jambaladinni. Paddy, Javar, Sunflower, Cotton are the primary crops farmers grow in this village. Lands are irrigated through the channels from Tungabadra left bank canal.

It has ancient Hanuman temple at the center of village. It has educated young people like lawyers, engineers, and doctors.

== See also ==
- Devadurga
- Lingasugur
- Manvi
- Raichur
