= Kotekal =

- Village
- Location within Karnataka Location within India
- Coordinates: 16°6′21″N 76°41′33″E
- Country: India
- State: Karnataka
- District: Raichur district
- Taluk: Manvi

Population (2011)
  - Total: 1,090

Languages
  - Official: Kannada
- Time zone: UTC+5:30 (IST)
- PIN: 584 120
- Telephone code: 08538
- Vehicle registration: KA 36

Kotekal near Pamanakallur is a village in the Manvi taluk of Raichur district in the Indian state of Karnataka. Kotekal is located northwest to Manvi town. Kotekal lies on road connecting Raichur and Bagalkot. It is locally famous for its forts which were built 400 years ago. It is known in taluk for the village festival "durgamba jaatre" which will be celebrated once every 5 years.

== Demographics ==
As of 2011 India census, Kotekal had a population of 1090 with 566 males and 524 females and 260 households.

== Importance ==
Kotekal is known for the ancient forts (Kote in Kannada) located on hills in the village.

== See also ==
- Devadurga
- Lingasugur
- Manvi
- Raichur
