= Maladkal =

Village in Karnataka, India

Maladkal Maladakal, Mandkal
- village
- Maladkal
- Anthem: Jaya Bharata Jananiya Tanujate, Jana Gana Mana
- Maladkal pointed on Karnataka map Maladkal (India) Maladkal (Asia)
- Coordinates: 16°16′45.12″N 77°6′13.62″E
- Country: India
- State: Karnataka
- District: Raichur
- Taluk: Devadurga
- Seat: Sarpanch

Government
  - Body: Gram panchayat

Area
  - Total: 2,777.802 ha (6,864.10 acres)
- Highest elevation (Paramananda hill): 450 m (1,480 ft)

Population (2011)
  - Total: 2,819
- Demonym: Kannadigas

Language
  - Official: Kannada
- Time zone: UTC+05:30 (IST)
- PIN: 584113
- Area code: 08532
- Geocode: 16.27665113566765, 77.10435483175563
- Vehicle registration: KA 36

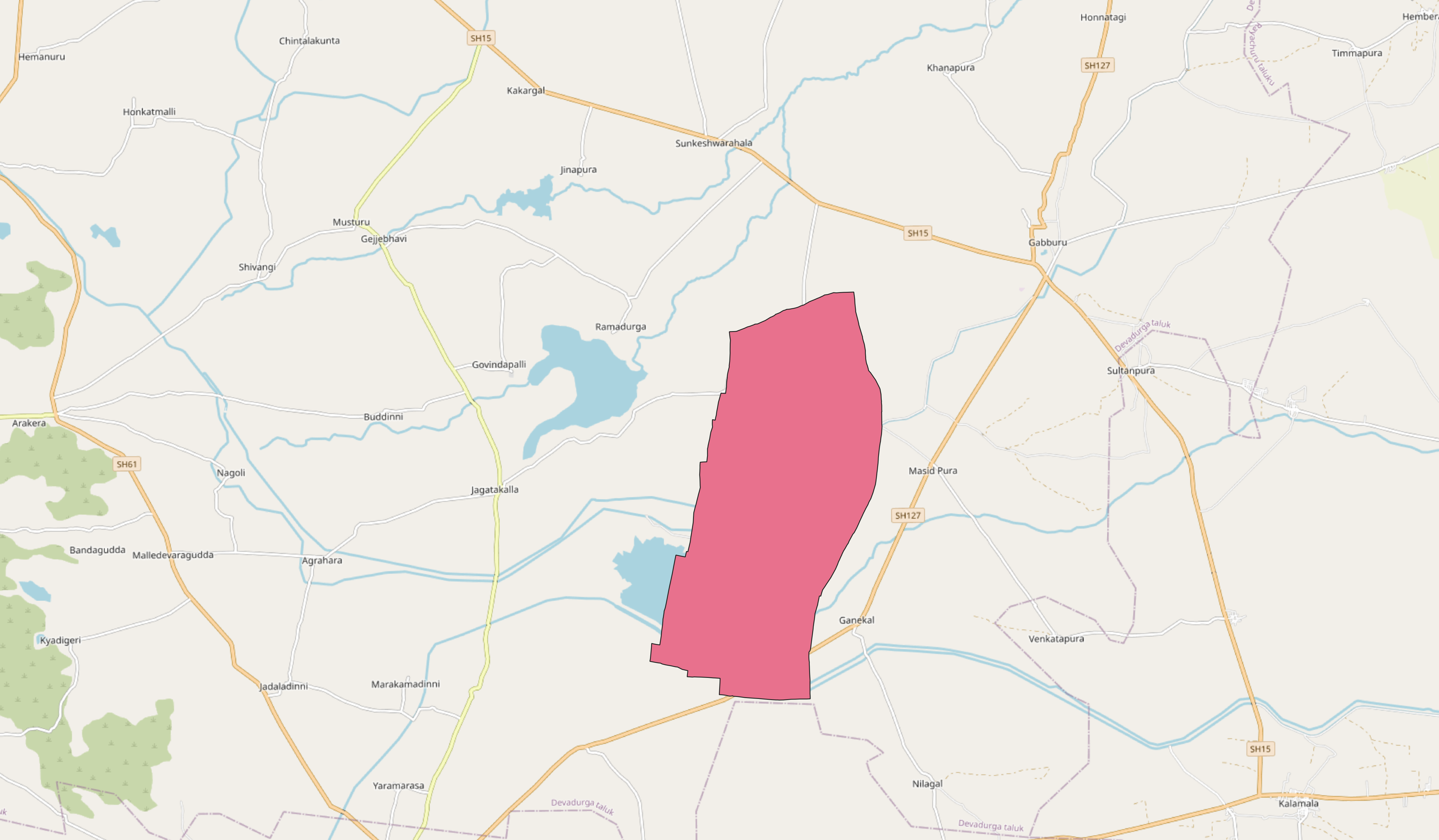
Maladkal boundary mapped by KGIS

Maladkal is a village in Karnataka state. It comes under Raichur District, Devadurga Taluk and Gabbur hobli. Maladkal lies in northern part of Karnataka (Kalyana Karnataka Division). Maladkal shares its boundary with Gabbur, Ramadurga, Jagatakal, N Ganekal, Maseedpur and Atnur (Manvi taluk). Maladakal is one of the Gram Panchayat in Raichur District.

The village majorly consists of hardworking farmers as most families are agriculture oriented and others hold their personal businesses. Crops produced in this village are cotton, chilli and rice but, some people also grow vegetables for their livelihood. Maladkal is a self sustained village as most of villages in India, the villagers are mostly interdependent for their livelihood.

After, the completion of Basava Sagara dam (Narayanpura dam) irrigation project the villagers also switched to irrigation farming from dryland farming. Before irrigation farmers used to grow jowar, wheat, millet, sunflower and other dryland crops.

== History ==
As the village lies in part of Raichur Doab has diverse history and culture. The village is considered to be a Neolithic site as some of rock arts were found on the hill. This indicates strong cultural influences to pre-modern era.

== Demographics ==
As of 2011 census Maladkal had a population of 2819 among which 1375 were male and 1444 female. 2001 census indicates total population of 2330 among which 1160 were male and 1172 female.

== Transport ==
The village connects to state highway (SH15) from a well maintained road constructed under Gram Sadak Yojana. There are two buses provided by Kalyana Karnataka Road Transport Corporation (previously known as KSRTC) a government run road transport. The two buses connect to Raichur(District) and Devadurga(Tehsil). Nearby Railway station is Raichur railway station which can be reached by bus.

=== Bus route ===
By road Raichur District is about 40km. There are total of four stops on the way (Maladkal-Gabbur-Sulthanpur-Murhanpur-Kalmala-Raichur). Tahsil Devadurga is about 30km.

== See also ==
- Devadurga, India
- Districts of Karnataka
- Gabbur
- List of taluks of Karnataka
- Raichur district
- Shivaraj Patil
