= Pamanakallur =

Pamanakallur Pamanakallooru
- Village
- Location within Karnataka Location within India
- Coordinates: 16°6′9″N 76°40′33″E
- Country: India
- State: Karnataka
- District: Raichur district
- Taluk: Manvi

Population (2001)
  - Total: 2,986

Languages
  - Official: Kannada
- Time zone: UTC+5:30 (IST)
- PIN: 584 120
- Telephone code: 08538
- Vehicle registration: KA 36

Pamanakallur is a village in the Manvi taluk of Raichur district in the Indian state of Karnataka. Pamanakallur is located northwest to Manvi town. Pamanakallur lies on road connecting Raichur and Bagalkot.

== Demographics ==
As of 2001 India census, Pamanakallur had a population of 2,986 with 1,479 males and 1,507 females and 540 Households.

== See also ==
- Byagawat
- Devadurga
- Lingasugur
- Manvi
- Raichur
