= Masarkal =

Masarakal
- Village
- Location within Karnataka Location within India
- Coordinates: 16°22′9.86″N 77°1′1.79″E
- India: India
- State: Karnataka
- District: Raichur district
- Taluk: Devadurga

Population (2001)
  - Total: 4,685

Languages
  - Official: Kannada
- Time zone: UTC+5:30 (IST)
- Vehicle registration: KA-36

Masarkal is a village in the Devadurga taluk of Raichur district in the Indian state of Karnataka. Masarkal is located southeast of Devadurga town, on the road connecting Kalmala and Devadurga. Sri Gopaladasara Janmastala and Muktayakka lived in Masarkal in the 12th century.. The poet Gopaladasa was born in Masarkal in 1721, and Muktayakka, Ajaganna, Murugrndra Swamy, Marasilingeshwara lived there. It is also known for Babayya Darga where every year ursu takes place.

== Demographics ==
As of 2001 India census, Masarkal had a population of 4,685 with 2,366 males and 2,319 females in 734 Households.

== See also ==
- Kalmala
- Devadurga
- Lingasugur
- Sindhanur
- Raichur
