= Kapagal =

- Village
- Location within Karnataka Location within India
- Coordinates: 16°1′47.62″N 77°9′21.15″E
- Country: India
- State: Karnataka
- District: Raichur district
- Taluk: Manvi

Population (2001)
  - Total: 2,673

Languages
  - Official: Kannada
- Time zone: UTC+5:30 (IST)
- Telephone code: 08538
- Vehicle registration: KA-36

Kapagal is a village in the Manvi taluk of Raichur district in the Indian state of Karnataka. Kapagal is well connected by road and it lies on Karnataka State highway 19. Kapagal is 8 km from Manvi and 40 km from District Headquarters Raichur. Nearest major railway station is in Raichur.

== Demographics ==
As of 2001 India census, Kapagal had a population of 2,673 with 1,355 males and 1,318 females and 475 Households.

== See also ==
- Manvi
- Sindhanur
- Lingasugur
- Raichur
- Karnataka
