= Galag =

- village
- Location in Karnataka, India Galag (India)
- Coordinates: 16°16′N 76°50′E
- Country: India
- State: Karnataka
- District: Raichur
- Talukas: Devadurga

Population (2001)
  - Total: 5,279

Languages
  - Official: Kannada
- Time zone: UTC+5:30 (IST)

Galag is a village in the southern state of Karnataka, India. It is located in the Devadurga taluk of Raichur district in Karnataka.

== Demographics ==
As of 2001 India census, Galag had a population of 5279 with 2632 males and 2647 females.

== See also ==
- Raichur
- Districts of Karnataka
