= Kyadigera =

- Village
- Location in Karnataka, India Kyadigera (India)
- Coordinates: 16°13′55″N 76°57′19″E
- Country: India
- State: Karnataka
- District: Raichur
- Taluk: Devadurga, India

Population (2001)
  - Total: 5,209

Languages
  - Official: Kannada
- Time zone: UTC+5:30 (IST)
- PIN: 584 129
- Telephone code: 08537
- Vehicle registration: KA-36

Kyadigera is a village in Devadurga taluk of Raichur district in the Indian state of Karnataka. Kyadigera was part of Shorapur kingdom and has an ancient fort. Kyadigera lies between Sirwar and Arakera.

== Demographics ==
As of 2001 India census, Kyadigera had a population of 5209 with 2647 males and 2562 females.

== Transport ==
Kyadigera can be reached from Devadurga, Raichur and Shorapur. Nearest major railway station is in Raichur.

== See also ==
- Devadurga
- Lingasugur
- Shorapur
- Raichur
- Districts of Karnataka
