= Rajalabanda =

Rajalabanda Rajalbanda
- Village
- Location within Karnataka Location within India
- Coordinates: 15°58′12.29″N 77°10′12.29″E
- Country: India
- State: Karnataka
- District: Raichur district
- Taluk: Manvi

Population (2001)
  - Total: 1,567

Languages
  - Official: Kannada
- Time zone: UTC+5:30 (IST)
- PIN: 584 203
- Telephone code: 08538
- Vehicle registration: KA-36

Rajalabanda, also spelled as Rajalbanda, is a village near Kurdi in the Manvi taluk of Raichur district in the Indian state of Karnataka. Rajalabanda is located on the banks of the Tungabhadra River and there is a barrage for the river in Rajalabanda and was executed by Mohammad khwaja Moinuddin (MKM) irrigation department raichur district.

== Demographics ==
As of the 2001 India census, Rajalabanda had a population of 1,567 with 768 males and 799 females and 263 Households.

== See also ==
- Mantralayam
- Manvi
- Raichur
