= Amingada =

Amingada is a village in Manvi taluk of Raichur district, Karnataka, India.
