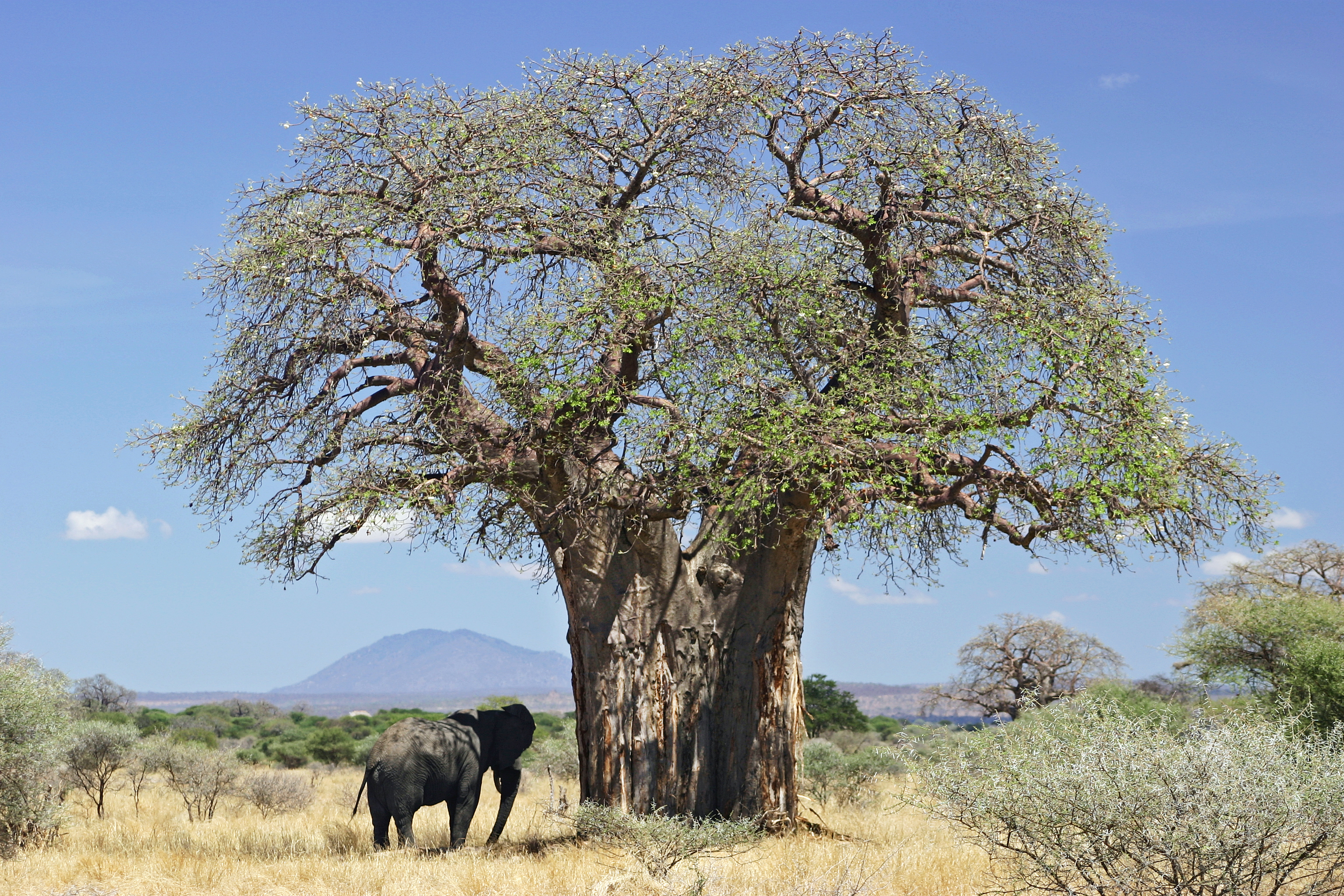
- Mature, flowering tree in Tanzania

Scientific classification
- Kingdom: Plantae
- Clade: Tracheophytes
- Clade: Angiosperms
- Clade: Eudicots
- Clade: Rosids
- Order: Malvales
- Family: Malvaceae
- Genus: Adansonia
- Species: A. digitata

Binomial name
- Adansonia digitata L.

Synonyms
- Adansonia bahobab L.; Adansonia baobab Gaertn.; Adansonia integrifolia Raf.; Adansonia kilima Pettigrew, K.L.Bell, Bhagw., Grinan, Jillani, Jean Mey., Wab; Adansonia scutula Steud. Syno; Adansonia situla (Lour.) Spreng.; Adansonia somalensis Chiov.; Adansonia sphaerocarpa A.Chev.; Adansonia sulcata A.Chev.; Baobabus digitata (L.) Kuntze; Ophelus sitularius Lour.

= Adansonia digitata =

African baobab

Species of plant native to Africa

Adansonia digitata, the African baobab, is the most widespread tree species of the genus Adansonia, the baobabs, and is native to the African continent and the southern Arabian Peninsula (Yemen, Oman). These are long-lived pachycauls; radiocarbon dating has shown at least one individual to be 1,275 years old. They are typically found in dry, hot savannas of sub-Saharan Africa, where they dominate the landscape and reveal the presence of a watercourse from afar. They have traditionally been valued as sources of food, water, health remedies or places of shelter and are a key food source for many animals. They are steeped in legend and superstition. In recent years, many of the largest, oldest trees have died, for unknown reasons. Other common names for the baobab include monkey-bread tree, upside-down tree, and cream of tartar tree.

== Description ==
African baobabs are trees that often grow as solitary individuals, and are large and distinctive elements of savanna or scrubland vegetation. They grow to a height of 5–25 metres (16–82 feet). The trunk is typically very broad and fluted or cylindrical, often with a buttressed, spreading base. Trunks may reach a diameter of 10–14 m (33–46 ft), and may be made up of multiple stems fused around a hollow core. The hollow core found in many tree species is the result of wood removal, such as decay of the oldest, internal part of the trunk. In baobabs, however, many of the largest and oldest of the trees have a hollow core that is the result of a fused circle of three to eight stems sprouting from roots. The bark is grey and usually smooth. The main branches can be massive. All baobabs are deciduous, losing their leaves in the dry season, and remaining leafless for about eight months of the year. Flowers are large, white and hanging. The fruit are rounded with a thick shell.

The leaves are palmately compound with five to seven (sometimes up to nine) leaflets in mature trees, but seedlings and regenerating shoots may have simple leaves. The transition to compound leaves comes with age and may be gradual. African baobabs produce simple leaves much longer than most other Adansonia species. Leaflets are stalkless (sessile) to short-stalked and size is variable.

Flowering occurs in both the dry and the wet season. Buds are rounded with a cone-shaped tip. Flowers are showy and sometimes paired, but usually produced singly at the end of a hanging stalk about 15–90 centimetres (6–35 1/2 inches) in length. The calyx is typically made up of five (sometimes three) green triangular bent-back lobes (sepals) with a cream-coloured, hairy interior. The petals are white, roughly the same width and length – up to 8 cm (3 in), and are crumpled in bud. Flowers open during the late afternoon, staying open and fertile for only one night. The fresh flowers have a sweet scent, but after about 24 hours, they start to turn brown and emit a carrion smell. The androecium is white and made up of a 3–6 cm (1 1/4–2 1/4 in) long tube of fused stamens (a staminal tube) surrounded by unfused (free) filaments 3–5 cm long. There are a large number of stamens, 720–1,600 per flower, with reports of up to 2,000. Styles are white, growing through the staminal tube and projecting beyond it. They are usually bent at right-angles and topped with an irregular stigma. Pollen grains are spherical with spikes over the surface, typical of the Malvaceae family. Pollen grain diameter is around 50 microns.

All Adansonia develop large rounded indehiscent fruit which can be up to 25 cm (10 in) long with a woody outer shell. African baobab fruit are quite variable in shape, from nearly round to cylindrical. The shell is 6–10 millimetres (1/4–3/8 in) thick. Inside is a fleshy, light beige coloured pulp. As it dries, the pulp hardens into a crumbly powder. The seeds are hard and kidney-shaped with a 0.06-mm-thick coat. They show long-term dormancy, only germinating after fire or passing through an animal's digestive tract. It is thought that this is because the seed coat needs to be cracked or thinned to allow to water to penetrate before the seed can germinate.

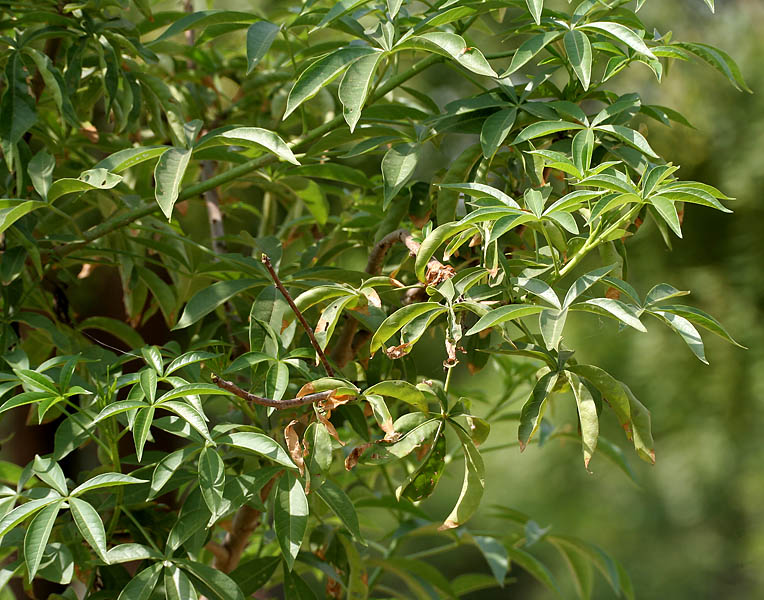
Each leaf comprises five leaflets

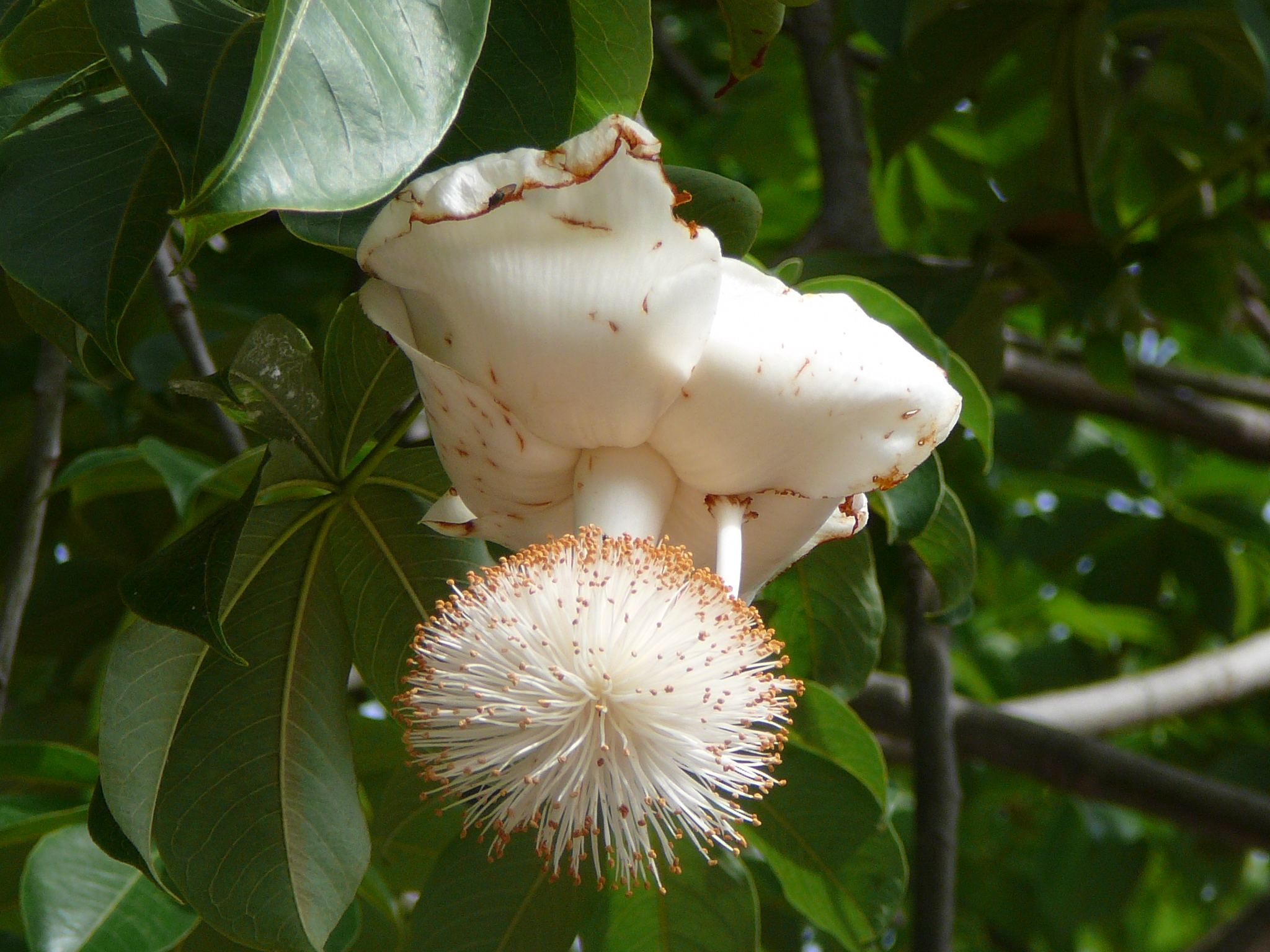
Open flower

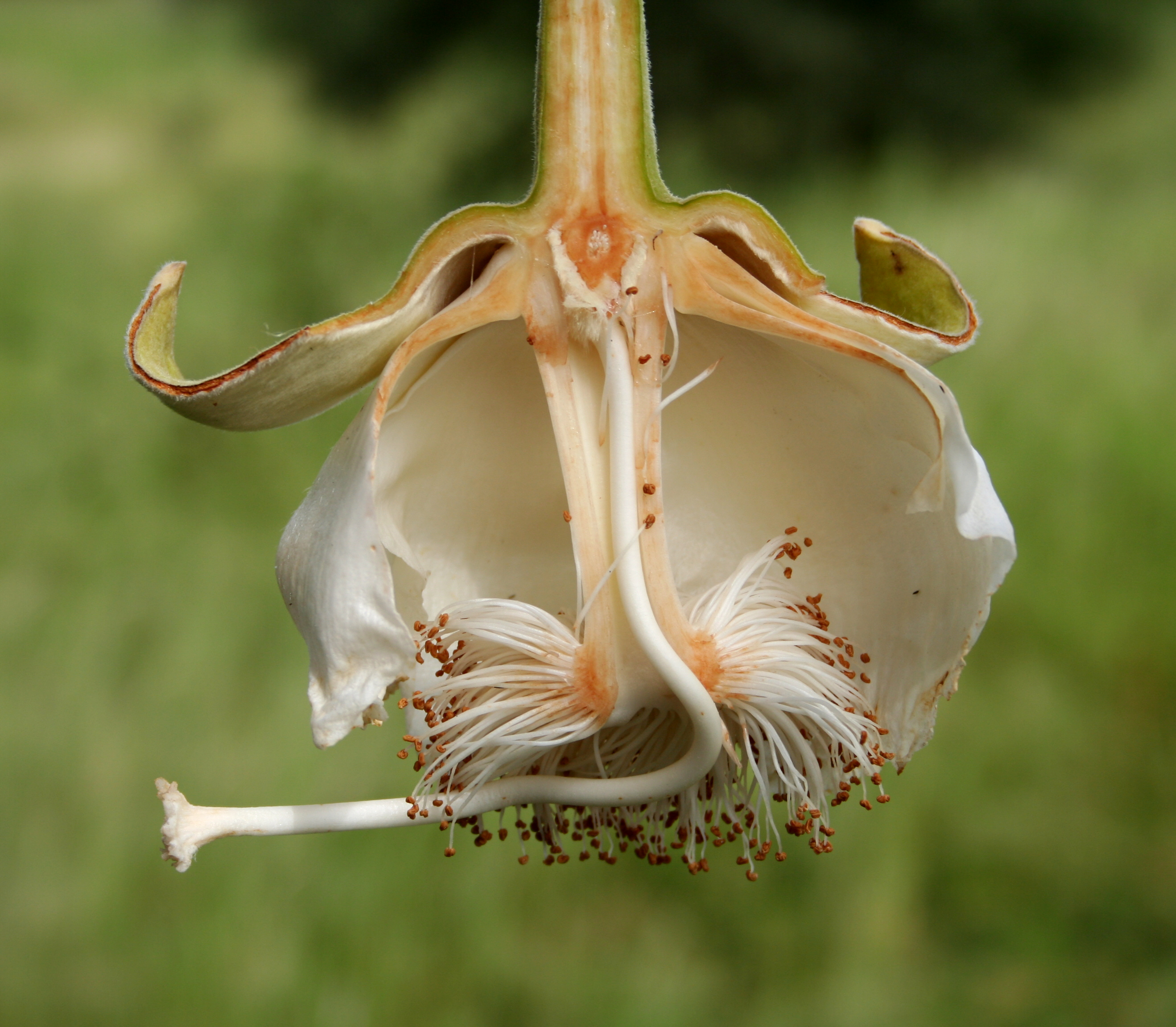
Bisected flower

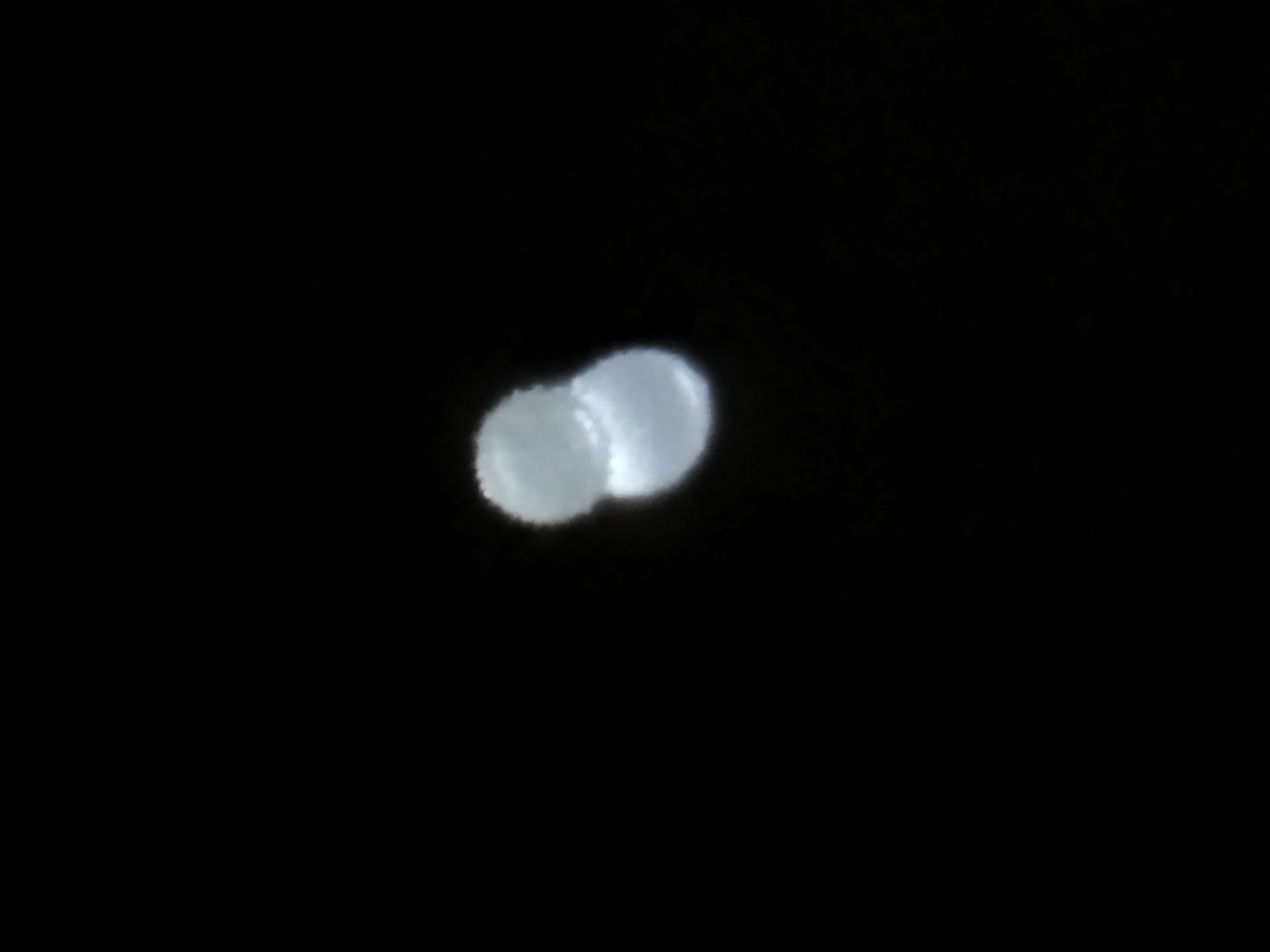
Two pollen grains overlapped

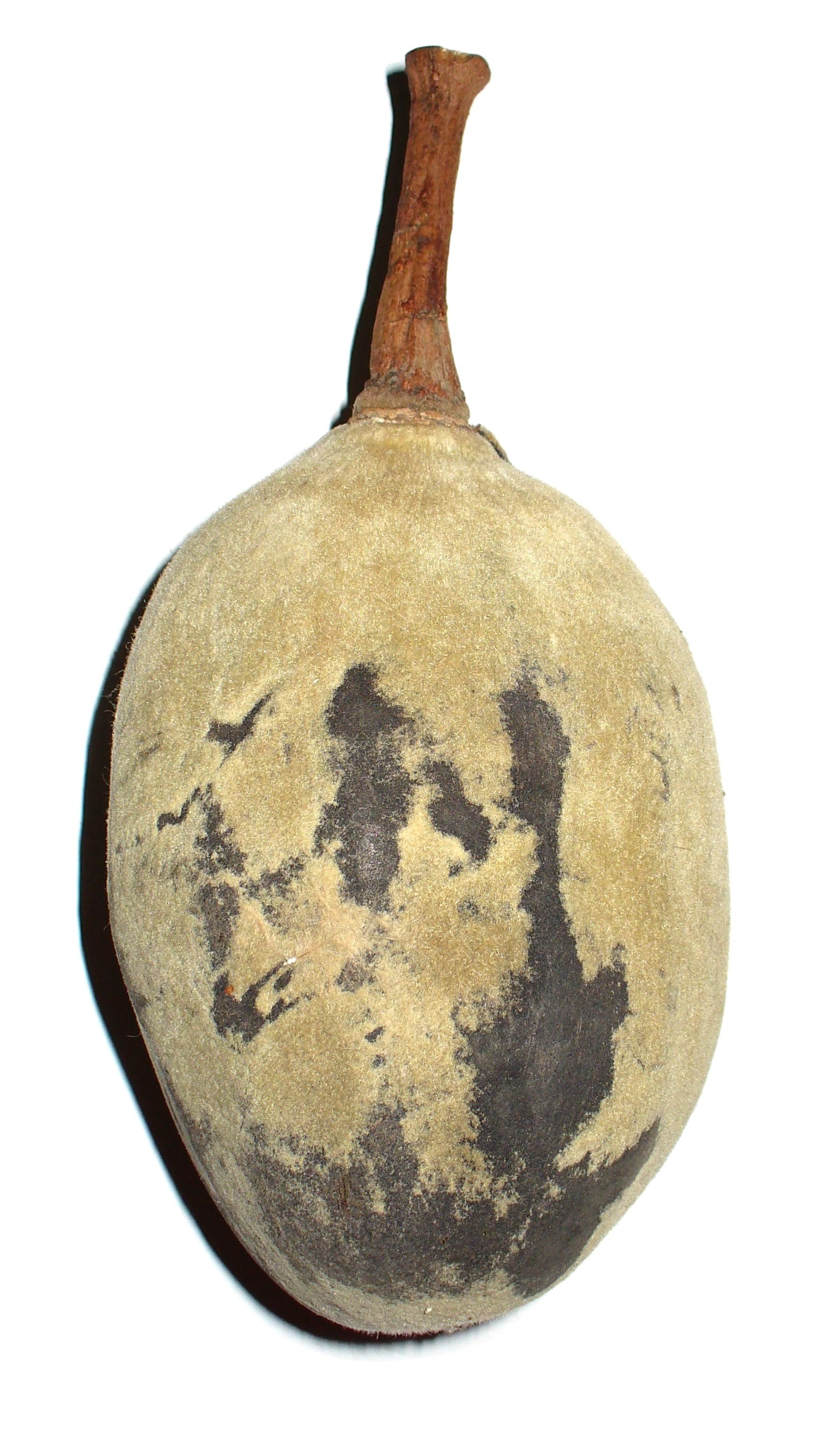
Fruit

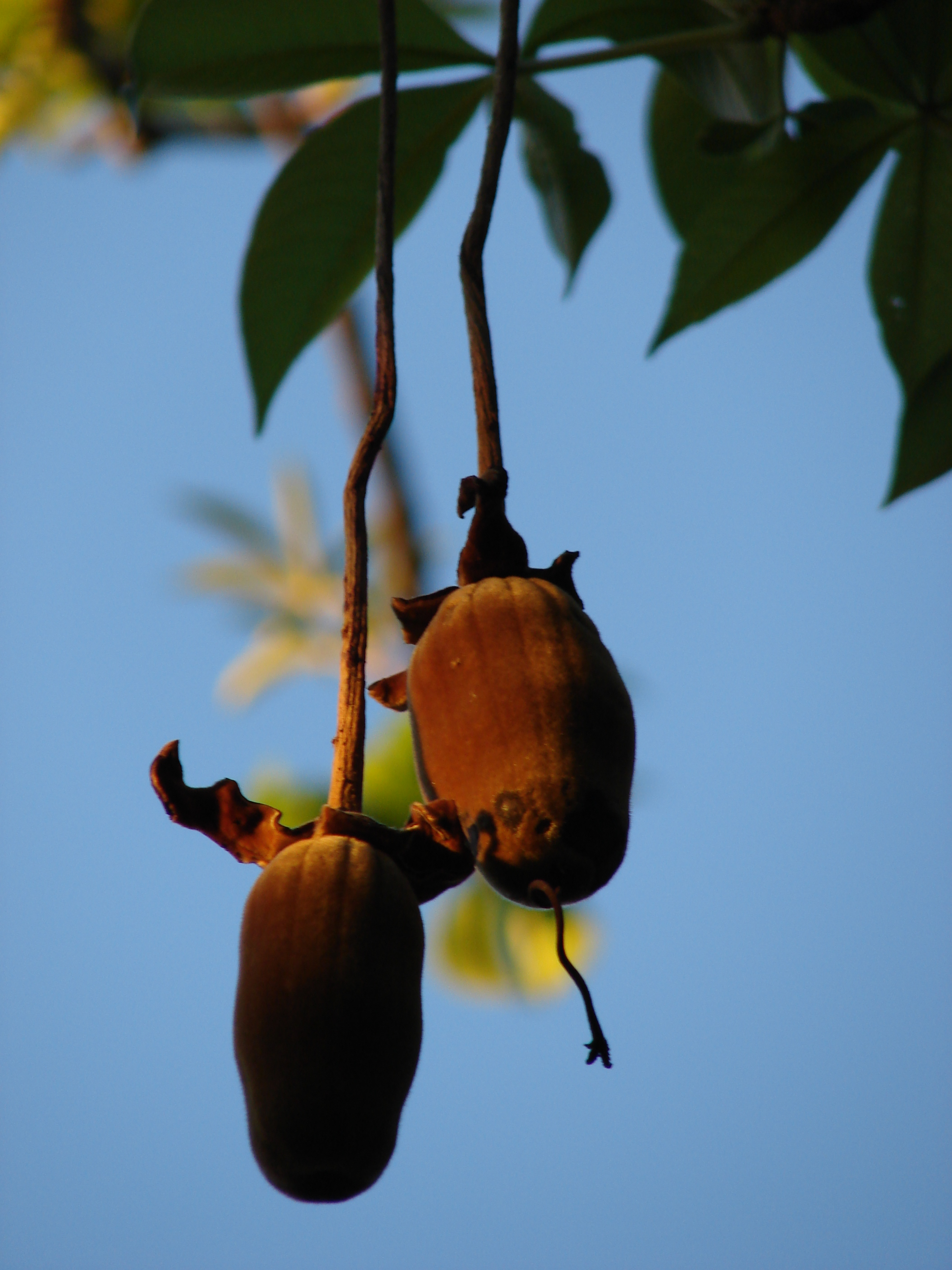
Hanging fruit at Ala Moana Beach Park, Oahu in Hawaii

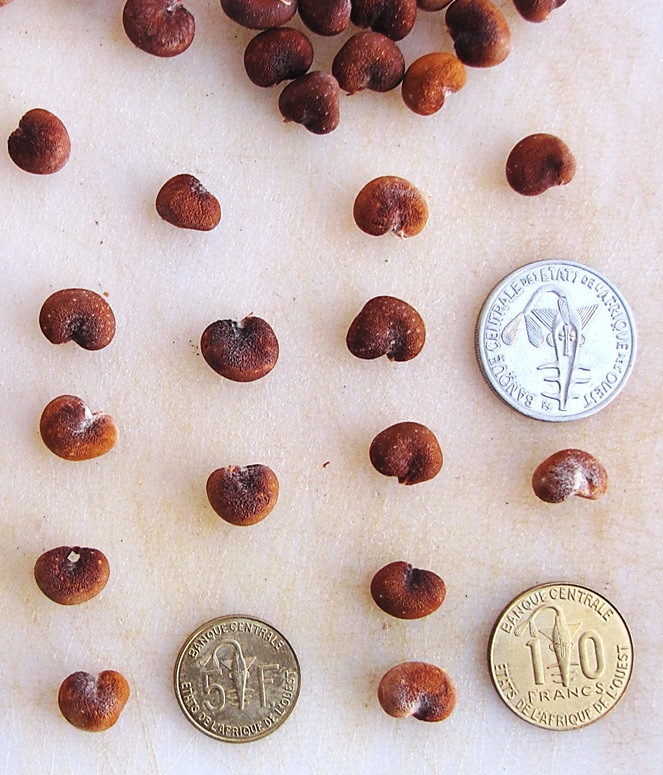
Seeds with coins

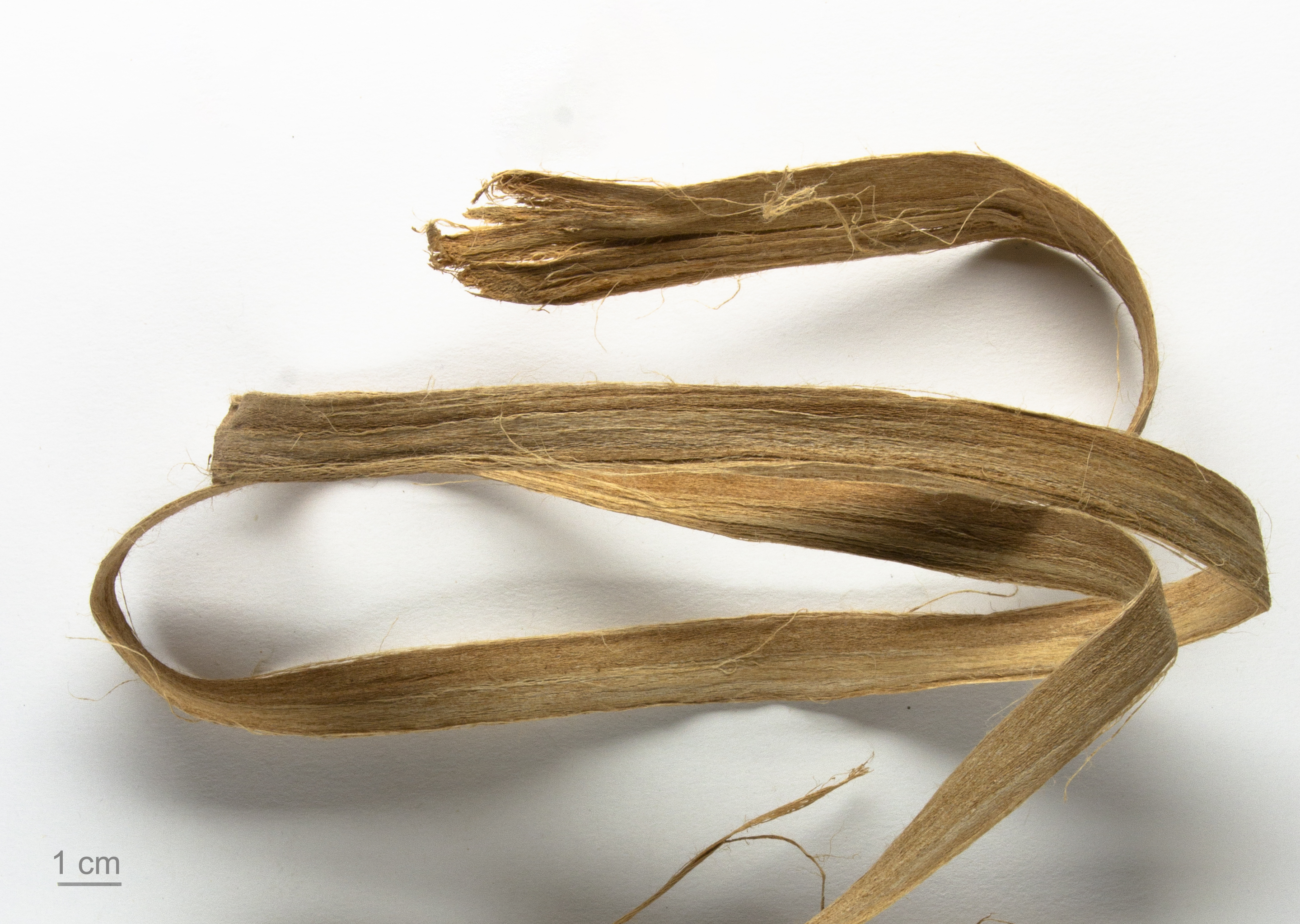
Bark fibers - MHNT

=== Water storage ===
Baobab trees store water in their trunks and branches on a seasonal basis as they live in areas of sustained drought and water inaccessibility. The U-shaped branches allow for water to trickle down, allowing for maximum absorption over an extended period of time even after the rain stops. The water is absorbed into the vascular tissue of the tree, where it can be moved into the tree's parenchyma cells for long-term storage, or used. A large Baobab can store as much as 136,400 liters of water.

During the dry season, the trees expel all of their leaves. During this period, the circumference of the trunk will shrink about 2–3 cm and the water content of the stem will drop by about 10%. Dropping leaves during the dry season is done to prevent water loss through transpiration out of the stomata, which would cause the water potentials in the vascular tissue to drop too low and pull water out of the vacuoles in the parenchyma cells. This would lead to the parenchyma cells, which make up the majority of the trunk and branches, to plasmolyse destroying the tree.

Baobab trees have much higher water and parenchyma content than most trees, which allows them to grow very large with less energy expenditure. Parenchyma are soft plant tissue cells that are commonly used for water storage in other drought tolerant species like cactus and succulents. The water fluxes from the vascular tissue into the parenchyma cells at the center of the tree with the help of actively transported ions. The ion flux into the cell will shift the concentration gradients, causing water to rush into the cells for long-term storage.

Another reason why the water in the trunk can only be used as a buffer for long-term deficits is the distance between the vascular tissue and the parenchyma. The transportation of water from the vascular tissue into storage cells is a very slow process as it is a high-resistance path. The water in the cells at the core of the trunk and the branches would take too much energy from the tree to move back into the vascular tissue for daily use.

=== Bark ===
Baobab trees have a thick fibrous bark that possesses an exceptional capacity to heal from even severe damage. Unlike most trees, the depth of the bark (up to 8 cm in mature specimens) is due to thickening of the secondary phloem rather than the periderm, with the former accounting for 75% of the bark by volume. In addition to water storage, the abundance of parenchyma enhances the structural integrity of the tree, as they complement the phloem fibers to provide compressive and tensile strength, respectively. Moreover, a high density of parenchyma also contributes to the healing capacity of the bark, as these cells may undergo further division, and have some capacity to redifferentiate. The spongy material of the bark allows water to be absorbed deeper into the tissue, as there is rarely enough rain during the wet season to penetrate the litter layer of soil.

=== Longevity ===
The growth rate of baobab trees is determined by ground water or rainfall. The trees produce faint growth rings, but counting growth rings is not a reliable way to age baobabs because some years a tree will form multiple rings and some years none.

Radiocarbon dating has provided data on a few individual A. digitata specimens. The Panke baobab in Zimbabwe was around 2,450 years old when it died in 2011, making it the oldest angiosperm ever documented, and two other trees—Dorslandboom in Namibia and Glencoe in South Africa—were estimated to be approximately 2,000 years old. Another specimen known as Grootboom was dated after it died and found to be at least 1,275 years old. Baobabs may be so long-lived in part due to their ability to periodically sprout new stems.

== Taxonomy ==
The scientific name Adansonia refers to the French explorer and botanist, Michel Adanson (1727–1806), who wrote the first botanical description for the full species. The species name digitata refers to the digits of the hand, as the baobab has compound leaves with normally five (but up to seven) leaflets, akin to a hand. A. digitata is the type species of the genus Adansonia and is the only species in the section Adansonia. All species of Adansonia except A. digitata are diploid; A. digitata is tetraploid. Some populations of African baobab have significant genetic differences and it has been suggested that the taxon contains more than one species. For example, the shape of the fruit varies considerably from region to region. In Angola, the fruit are elongated, rather than round. A proposed new species (Adansonia kilima Pettigrew, et al.), was described in 2012, found in high-elevation sites in eastern and southern Africa. This is now however no longer considered a distinct species, but a synonym of A. digitata. Some high-elevation trees in Tanzania show different genetics and morphology but further study is needed to determine if they should be considered a separate species.

=== History ===
The earliest written reports of African baobab are from a 14th-century travelogue by the Arab traveler Ibn Batuta. The first botanical description was by Alpino (1592) looking at fruit that he observed in Egypt from an unknown source. They were called Bahobab, possibly from the Arabic "bu hibab", meaning "many-seeded fruit". The French explorer and botanist, Michel Adanson observed a baobab tree in 1749 on the island of Sor, Senegal, and wrote the first detailed botanical description of the full tree, accompanied with illustrations. Recognising the connection to the fruit described by Alpino he called the genus Baobab. Linnaeus later formally named the genus Adansonia, to honour Adason, but use of baobab as the commonest vernacular name has persisted. Additional common names include monkey-bread tree (the soft, dry fruit is edible), upside-down tree (the sparse branches resemble roots), and cream of tartar tree (cream of tartar) because of the powdery fruit pulp.

== Distribution and habitat ==
The African baobab is associated with tropical savannas. It is found in drier climates, is sensitive to water logging and frost, and is not found in areas where sand is deep. It is native to mainland Africa between the latitudes 16° N and 26° S. The tree has also been introduced to many other regions, including Madagascar, India, Australia and coastal Southeast Asia.

The northern limit of its distribution in Africa is associated with rainfall patterns; only on the Atlantic coast and in the Sudanian savanna does its occurrence venture naturally into the Sahel. In East Africa, the trees grow also in shrublands and on the coast. In Angola and Namibia, the baobabs grow in woodlands, and in coastal regions, in addition to savannas.

It is an introduced species in many tropical countries. Arab traders introduced it to northwestern Madagascar where baobab trees were often planted at the center of villages.

Judging by the size of many baobabs in India, they could be thousands of years old. It is known that the Arab, Portuguese, British, and Dutch colonial eras resulted in an influx of Africans to India for the purpose of both labor and military conscription, and the premise is that these individuals brought baobab seeds with them. Similarly, the presence of baobabs in the Caribbean reflects both African symbolic and nutritional sensibility, brought from Africa to places like Martinique, Jamaica, and St. Vincent during the plantation era. Hence many of the oldest specimens in the region date back to the early 1700s, prior to the establishment of botanical gardens in the region. In both India and the Caribbean, the species is entwined with African history.

In addition, the species has been cultivated in Israel, particularly at the International Botanical Gardens at Kibbutz Ein Gedi, located in the Judean Desert. Since the trunk is capable of storing a huge quantity of water, the species does well in this climate, with some baobabs growing even larger than those in the species' original localities.

== Ecology ==
All baobabs are deciduous, losing their leaves in the dry season, and remaining leafless for about eight months of the year. The African baobab is largely found in savannah habitats, which tend to be fire-prone. Adaptations to survive frequent fires include a thick and fire-resistant bark and thick-shelled fruit. Trees older than about 15 years have thick enough bark to withstand the heat of most savannah fires, while younger trees can resprout after fire. The thick outer shell of the fruit may serve to protect the seeds.

Pollination in the African baobab is achieved primarily by fruit bats, in West Africa mainly the straw-coloured fruit bat, Gambian epauletted fruit bat, and the Egyptian fruit bat. The flowers are also visited by galagos, and several kinds of insect.

With their hard coat, baobab seeds can withstand drying and remain viable over long periods. The fruit is eaten by many species and the germination potential is improved when seeds have passed through the digestive tract of an animal, or have been subjected to fire. Elephants and baboons are main dispersal agents and so the seeds can potentially be dispersed over long distances. The fruit floats and the seeds are waterproof, so African baobabs may also be spread by water. Some aspects of the baobab's reproductive biology are not yet understood but it is thought that pollen from another tree may be required to develop fertile seed. Isolated trees without a pollen source from another tree do form fruit, only to abort them at a later stage. The existence of some very isolated trees may then be due to their ability to disperse long distances but self-incompatibility.

The fruit, bark, roots and leaves are a key food source for many animals and the trees themselves are an important source of shade and shelter. Chimpanzees pound the seeds against the tree's branches and roots and rocks to open them in a "proto-tool use behavior".

== Conservation ==
The baobab is a protected tree in South Africa, and yet is threatened by various mining and development activities. In the Sahel, the effects of drought, desertification and over-use of the fruit have been cited as causes for concern. As of February 2025, the African baobab is not yet classified by the IUCN Red List, although there is evidence that populations may be declining. Many of the largest and oldest African baobabs have died in recent years. Greenhouse gases, climate change, and global warming appear to be factors reducing baobab longevity.

== Uses ==
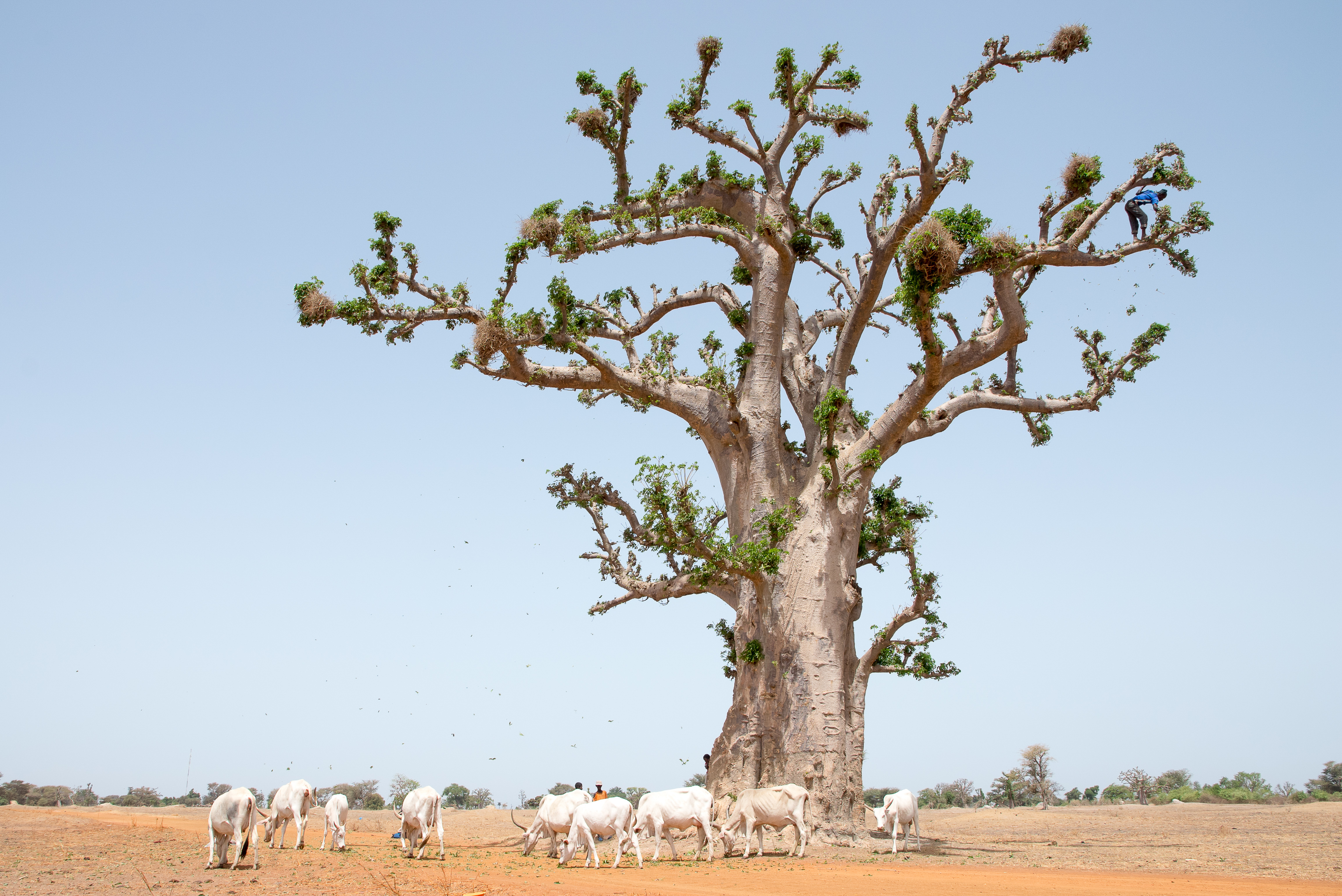
A cow-herder in Senegal harvests baobab leaves for forage in the dry season.

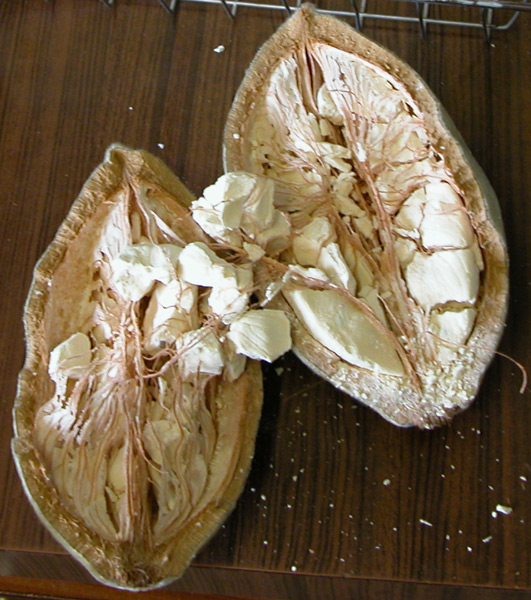
The fruit is used to make a drink.

People have traditionally valued the trees as sources of food, water, health remedies or places of shelter. The baobab is a traditional food plant in Africa, but is little-known elsewhere. Adanson concluded that the baobab, of all the trees he studied, "is probably the most useful tree in all". He consumed baobab juice twice a day while in Africa, and was convinced that it maintained his health. According to a modern field guide, the juice can help cure diarrhoea.

The roots and fruit are edible. The fruit has been suggested to have the potential to improve nutrition, boost food security, foster rural development and support sustainable land care. In Sudan, where the tree is called tebeldi (تبلدي), people make tabaldi juice by soaking and dissolving the dry pulp of the fruit in water, locally known as gunguleiz. Water can also be extracted from some of the trunks.

Baobab leaves can be eaten as a relish. Young fresh leaves are cooked in a sauce and sometimes are dried and powdered. The powder is called lalo in Mali and sold in many village markets in Western Africa. The leaves are used in the preparation of a soup termed miyan kuka in Northern Nigeria and are rich in phytochemicals and minerals. The seeds can be pounded into a flour or to extract oil for cooking. Baobab leaves are sometimes used as forage for ruminants in dry season. The oilmeal, which is a byproduct of oil extraction, can also be used as animal feed. Whole fruit, or just the fruit pulp, can be stored for months under dry conditions.

The fibre from the bark can be used to make cloth. In times of drought, elephants consume the juicy wood beneath the bark of the baobab.

=== For export ===
In 2008, the European Union approved the use and consumption of baobab fruit. It is commonly used as an ingredient in smoothies and cereal bars. In 2009, the United States Food and Drug Administration granted generally recognised as safe status to baobab dried fruit pulp as a food ingredient.

== In culture ==
Along the Zambezi, the tribes believed that baobabs were upright and too proud. The gods became angry and uprooted them and threw them back into the ground upside-down. Evil spirits now cause bad luck to anyone that picks up the sweet white flowers. More specifically, a lion will kill them. In Kafue National Park, one of the largest baobabs is known as "Kondanamwali" or the "tree that eats maidens". The tree fell in love with four beautiful maidens. When they reached puberty, they made the tree jealous by finding husbands. So, one night, during a thunderstorm, the tree opened its trunk and took the maidens inside. A rest house has been built in the branches of the tree. On stormy nights, the crying of the imprisoned maidens can still be heard.

Some people believe that women living in kraals where baobabs are plentiful will have more children. This belief is scientifically plausible as those women will have better access to the tree's vitamin-rich leaves and fruit to complement a vitamin-deficient diet.

The tree also plays a role in Antoine De Saint-Exupéry's fictional children's book, The Little Prince. In the story, baobabs are described as dangerous plants which must be weeded out from the good plants, lest they overcome a small planet and even break it to pieces.

=== Prominent specimens ===
A number of individual baobab trees attract sightseers due to their age, size, history, location or isolated occurrence.

==== Cape Verde ====
There is a large baobab tree in the town of Santa Maria on the island of Sal, Cape Verde islands.

==== Botswana ====
Around Gweta, Botswana, some have been declared national monuments. Green's Baobab, 27 km south of Gweta was inscribed by the 19th-century hunters and traders Frederick Thomas Green and Hendrik Matthys van Zyl besides other ruthless characters. Fred and Charles Green passed the baobab during an expedition to Lake Ngami and left the inscription "Green's Expedition 1858–1859". An earlier inscription by an unknown traveller reads "1771". About 11 km south of Green's Baobab is the turn-off to Chapman's Baobab, also known as Seven Sisters or Xaugam, i.e. "lion's tail" in Tsoa. It was once an enormous multi-stemmed tree, used by passing explorers, traders and travellers as a navigation beacon. It guided them as they navigated the extensive salt pan northwards, while a hollow in the trunk served as a letterbox. The explorer and hunter James Chapman left an engraving on a large root when he passed the tree with artist Thomas Baines in 1861, but Livingstone, Oswell, Moffat, and Selous also camped here. Livingstone supposedly carved a cross and his initials, and conveyed his 1853 sojourn in Missionary Travels, noting: "about two miles beyond [the immense saltpan Ntwetwe] we unyoked under a fine specimen of baobab, ... It consisted of 6 branches united into one trunk." It had a circumference of 25 m before its constituent trunks collapsed outward on 7 January 2016. Not all its trunks are confirmed dead however, one showing signs of life in 2019. Seven trees known as the Sleeping Sisters or Baines' Baobabs grow on a tiny islet in Kudiakam Pan, Botswana. They are named for Thomas Baines who painted them in May 1862, while en route to Victoria Falls. The fallen giant of Baines' day is still sprouting leaves (as of 2004), and a younger generation of trees are in evidence. The islet is accessible in winter when the pan is dry. Some large specimens have been transplanted to new sites, as was the one at Cresta Mowana lodge in Kasane.

==== Ghana ====
At Saakpuli (also Sakpele) in northern Ghana the site of a 19th-century slave transit camp is marked by a stand of large baobabs, to which slaves were chained.

The chains were wrapped around their trunks or around the roots. Similarly, two trees at Salaga in central Ghana are reminders of the slave trade. One, located at the former slave market at the center of town, was replanted at the site of the original to which slaves were shackled. A second larger tree marks the slave cemetery, where bodies of dead slaves were dumped.

==== India ====
Inside the Golconda Fort in Hyderabad, India, is a baobab tree estimated to be 430 years old. It is the largest baobab outside of Africa.

==== Madagascar ====
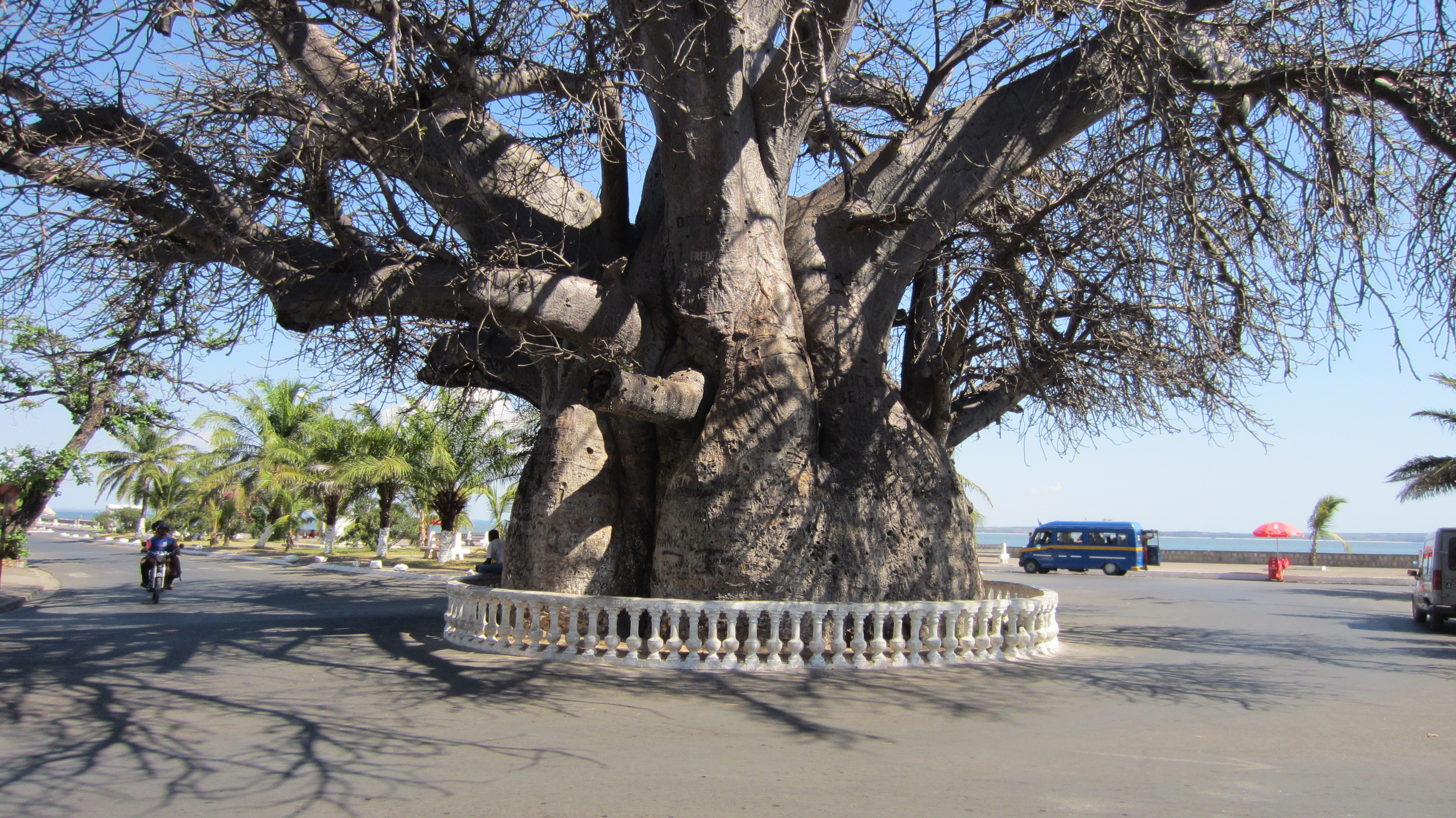
The baobab in Mahajanga, Madagascar

The African baobab in Mahajanga, Madagascar, had a circumference of 21 metres (69 ft) by 2013. It became the symbol of the city and was formerly a place for executions and important meetings.

==== Mozambique ====
The Lebombo Eco Trail tree is about 18.5 m (61 ft) tall with a diameter of almost 22 m (72 ft). It was found to be about 1400 years old and made up of five stems with ages between 900 and 1400 years, fused in a ring leaving a large central cavity.

==== Namibia ====
The Ombalantu baobab in Namibia has a hollow trunk that can accommodate some 35 people. At times it has served as a chapel, post office, house, and hiding site. The Holboom baobab (Holboom, Nyae Nyae Conservancy, Namibia) is one of the trees with a hollow core. It measures 35.10 m (115.2 ft) around and radiocarbon dating shows it to be about 1750 years old.

==== Senegal ====
The first botanical description of A. digitata was done by Adanson based on a tree on the island of Sor, Senegal. On the nearby Îles des Madeleines Adanson found a baobab that was 3.8 metres (12 ft) in diameter, which bore the carvings of passing mariners on its trunk, including those of Prince Henry the Navigator in 1444 and André Thevet in 1555. When Théodore Monod searched the island in the 20th century, this tree was not to be found. The Gouye Ndiouly or Guy Njulli ("baobab of circumcision") may be the oldest baobab in Senegal and the northern hemisphere. The partially collapsed tree from which new stems have emerged is situated near the bank of the Saloum River at Kahone. It was formerly the venue for the gàmmu, an annual festival during which the kingdom's provincial rulers pledged their loyalty to the king. From 1593 to 1939, 49 kings of the Guélewars dynasty were inducted at this tree. It was beside the place where the Buur Saloum organised circumcision ceremonies, and in 1862, it became the scene of a battle.

==== US Virgin Islands ====
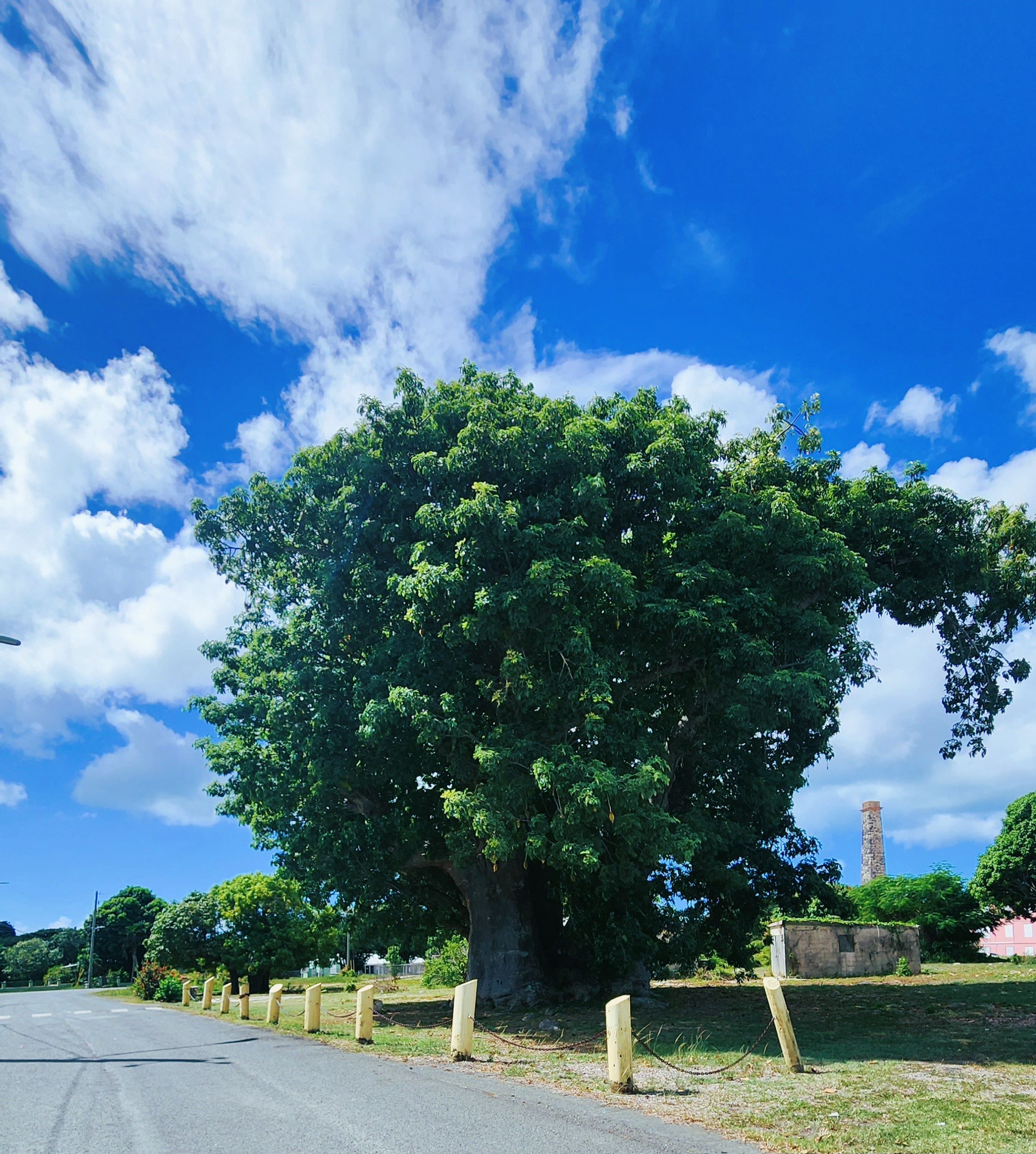
Grove Place Baobab on St. Croix.

The Grove Place Baobab, listed as a Champion Tree, is believed to be the oldest (250–300 years) of some 100 baobabs on Saint Croix in the US Virgin Islands. It is seen as a living testament to centuries of African presence, as the seeds were likely introduced by an African slave who arrived at the former estate during the 18th century. According to the bronze memorial plaque, twelve women were rounded up during the 1878 Fireburn labor riot, and hanged beneath the tree. It has since been a rallying place for plantation laborers and unions.

==== Zimbabwe ====
Zimbabwe's Big Tree, near Victoria Falls, stands 25 metres tall and is visited by hundreds of thousands of tourists yearly. Radiocarbon dating has shown this one to be made up of several stems of various ages, with the oldest about 1150 years old.

Notable extant specimens
Specimen	Location	Coordinate
Kumana Baobab	southern Kruger Park, South Africa	24°37′06″S 31°47′13″E
Gannahoek Baobab	near Thabazimbi, South Africa	24°26′17″S 27°08′47″E
Glencoe Baobab (2009 split)	near Hoedspruit, South Africa	24°22′25″S 30°51′24″E
Briscoe's Baobab	central Kruger Park, South Africa	24°02′39″S 31°51′40″E
Big Baobab Leydsdorp	Leydsdorp-Gravellotte, Limpopo, South Africa	23°57′26″S 30°34′30″E
Von Wielligh's Baobab	central Kruger Park, South Africa	23°56′27″S 31°43′05″E
Sunland Baobab (2016 & 2017 splits)	near Modjadjiskloof, South Africa	23°37′16″S 30°11′53″E
King of Ga-Ratjeke	between Modjadjiskloof and Giyani, South Africa	23°29′55″S 30°30′06″E
Baobab Lane (planted 1933/34)	between Tom Burke and Marnitz, South Africa	23°07′45″S 28°07′28″E
Big Tree	in Blouberg Nature Reserve, South Africa	22°59′48″S 29°04′20″E
Buffelsdrift Baobab	near Swartwater, South Africa	22°51′41″S 28°13′30″E
Sagole Baobab	near Tshipise, South Africa	22°30′00″S 30°38′00″E
Chapman's Baobab / Seven Sisters (2016 split)	Ntwetwe pan, south of Gweta, Botswana	20°29′25″S 25°14′58″E
Blue Bay Baobab	Blue Bay, Mauritius	20°25′53″S 57°42′57″E
Green's Baobab	27 km south of Gweta, Botswana	20°25′31″S 25°13′52″E
Baines' Baobabs / Sleeping Sisters	north of Gweta, Botswana	20°06′44″S 24°46′09″E
Nxai Pan Baobab (western shore)	north of Gweta, Botswana	19°53′46″S 24°43′15″E
Nxai Pan Baobabs	north of Gweta, Botswana	19°52′42″S 24°47′21″E
Holboom	Naye-Naye Concession, Otjozondjupa Region, Namibia	19°40′41″S 20°37′05″E
Dorslandboom	Mangetti, north of Tsumkwe, Namibia	19°25′07″S 20°35′37″E
Giant Baobab Tree (national monument)	Die Park, Otjozondjupa Region, Namibia	18°53′10″S 18°19′38″E
Savuti Baobab Island	Savuti Plains, Chobe, Botswana	18°32′19″S 24°06′28″E
Sinamatella Road Baobab	Hwange National Park, Zimbabwe	18°31′51″S 26°24′53″E
Ngoma Bridge baobabs	Chobe Forest Reserve, Botswana	17°55′34″S 24°43′09″E
Big Tree	near Victoria Falls, Zimbabwe	17°54′45″S 25°50′28″E
Okahao Baobab	Okahao, Namibia	17°53′38″S 15°03′59″E
Sir Howard's baobab	Tsandi, Namibia	17°44′51″S 14°53′41″E
Ombalantu Baobab	Outapi, northern Namibia	17°30′43″S 14°59′16″E
Hollow Mubuyu Tree	Katima Mulilo, Namibia	17°29′19″S 24°16′42″E
Kondanamwali	Kafue N.P., Zambia	ca. 16°19′49″S 25°55′29″E
Mahajanga / Majunga baobab	Mahajanga, Madagascar	15°43′17″S 46°18′18″E
Porto de Galinhas Baobabs	Porto de Galinhas, PE, Brazil	08°30′04″S 35°00′31″W
Stanley's Baobab	Boma, DRC	05°51′34″S 13°03′21″E
Poet's Boabab	Natal, RN, Brazil	05°48′20″S 35°12′34″W
L'arbre de Brazza	near Dolisie, Niari, Republic of the Congo	04°11′07″S 12°35′50″E
Mombasa Baobab Forest	Mombasa, Kenya	04°04′42″S 39°40′01″E
Lugard's Baobab	near Lokoja, Nigeria	07°49′11″N 06°44′07″E
Aliya-gaha / Elephant tree	Gangewadiya basin, Wilpattu N.P., Sri Lanka	ca. 8°17′41″N 79°50′50″E
Salaga slave market baobab	Salaga, Ghana	ca. 8°33′00″N 0°31′15″W
Salaga slave cemetery baobab	Salaga, Ghana	ca. 8°33′N 0°31′W
Pallimunai Baobab Tree	Pallimunai, Mannar District, Sri Lanka	08°58′54″N 79°55′24″E
Delft Island baobab	Neduntheevu, Jaffna District, Sri Lanka	09°30′45″N 79°42′55″E
Saakpuli slave camp baobabs	Saakpuli, near Pigu, Ghana	10°01′27″N 0°46′02″W
Kuka Katsi	Durbi Takusheyi, Nigeria	12°56′45″N 07°52′55″E
Gouye Ndiouly	Kahone, Kaolack Region, Senegal	ca. 14°08′37″N 16°00′27″W
Baak no Maad / King's Baobab	Joal-Fadiouth, Thiès Region, Senegal	14°09′12″N 16°49′25″W
Baobab Sacré	Fadial, Thiès Region, Senegal	14°10′25″N 16°46′39″W
Dakfao sacred baobab	Dakfao, Niger	14°12′03″N 03°16′11″E
Corniche Est baobab	East Corniche Road, Dakar, Senegal	14°39′43″N 17°26′00″W
Savanur Baobabs	Savanur, India	14°58′41″N 75°20′00″E
St. Maryam Dearit Shrine	near Keren, Eritrea	15°47′40″N 38°28′06″E
João Barrosa Baobabs	João Barrosa, Boa Vista, Cape Verde	16°01′08″N 22°44′31″W
Mirbat Baobab Forest	near Mirbat, Dhofar, Oman	17°03′11″N 54°36′39″E
Hatiyan Jhad Baobab Tree	Naya Qila, Golconda Fort, Hyderabad, India	17°23′34″N 78°24′39″E
Nanakramguda Baobab Tree	Nanakramguda, Hyderabad, India	17°25′26″N 78°20′40″E
Grove Place Baobab	Grove Place, Saint Croix, US Virgin Islands	17°43′34″N 64°49′28″W
Diu Rukhda Baobab	Diu Island, Nagao Beach, Gujarat, India	20°42′16″N 70°54′18″E
Zaymi Baobab	Zaymi, Al Batinah, Oman	24°27′16″N 56°16′41″E
Mallanimli Baobab	Orchha, Madhya Pradesh, India	25°21′51″N 78°38′32″E
Parijaat Tree	Kintoor, Uttar Pradesh, India	27°01′35″N 81°28′43″E

== Gallery ==
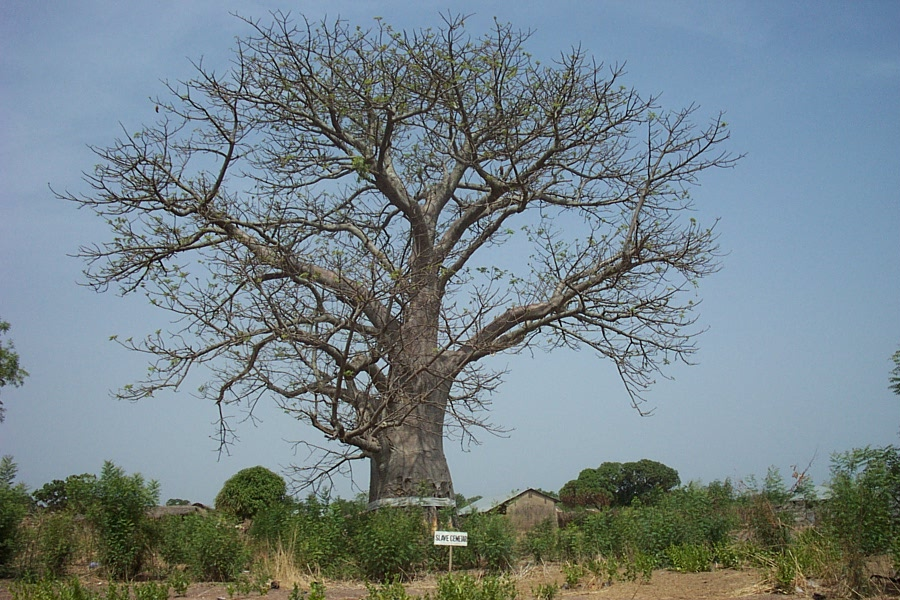
Baobab at the slave cemetery, Salaga. The white calico cloth indicates its spiritual significance.

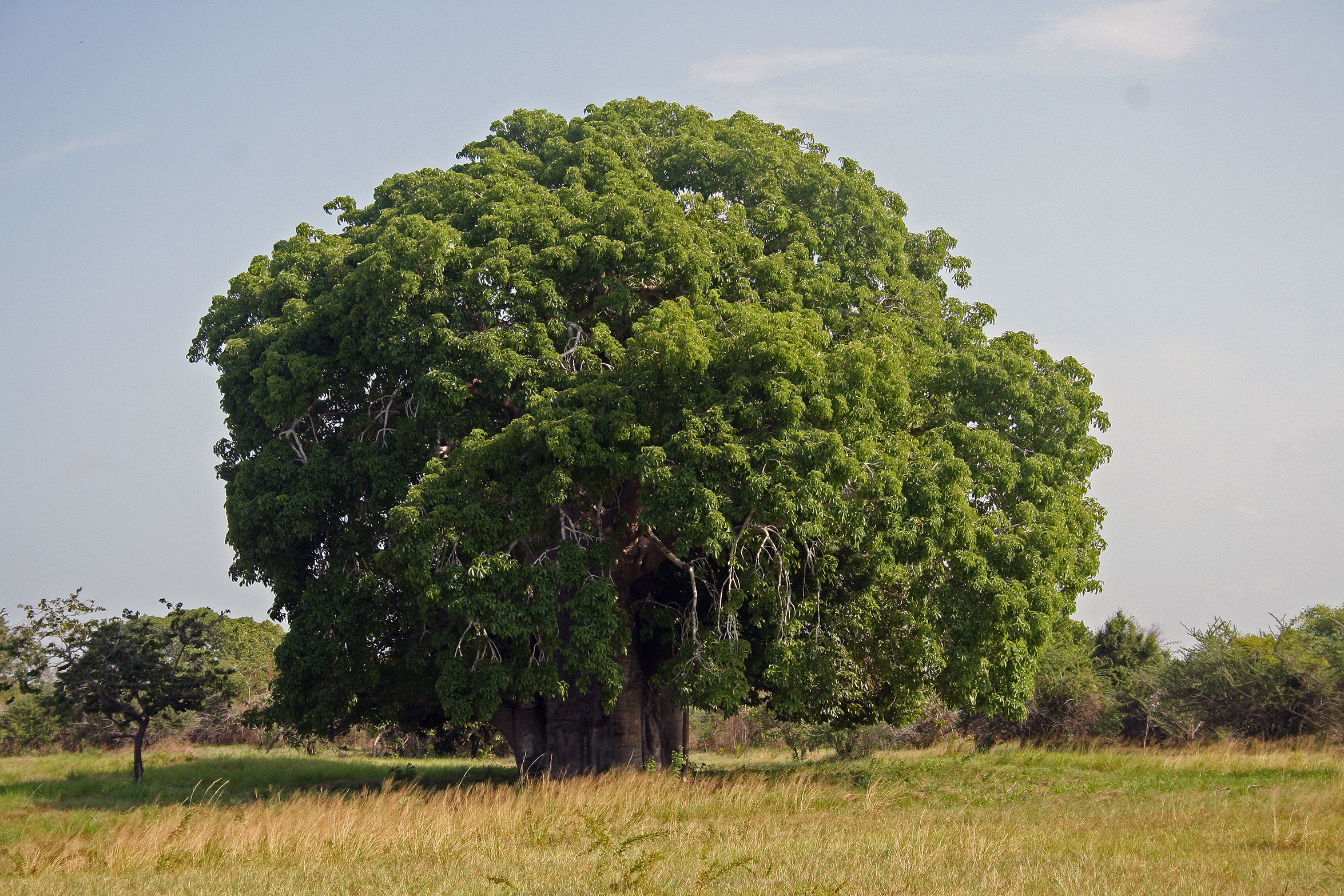
In full leaf at Bagamoyo, Tanzania

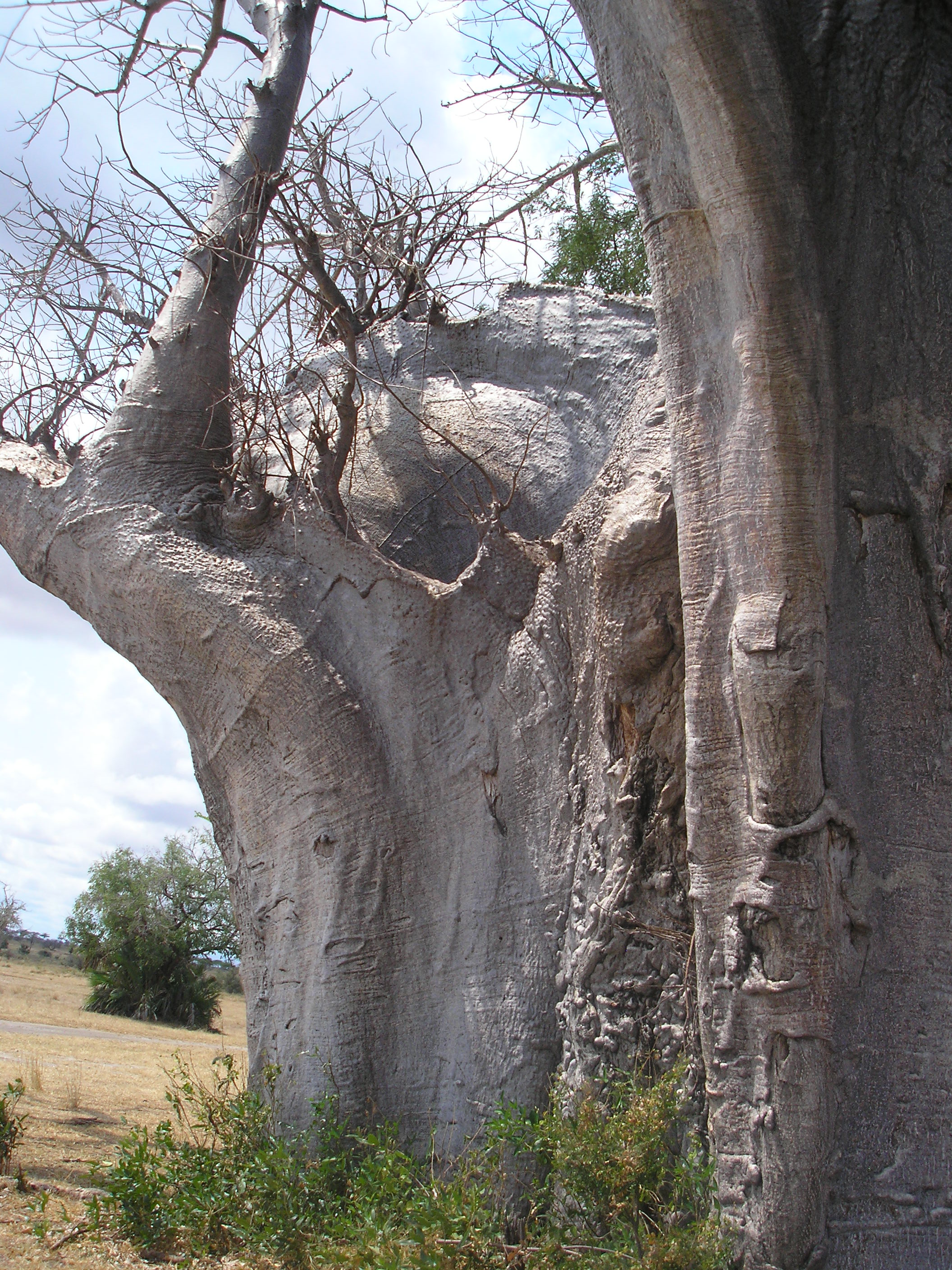
Detail of bark at Selous Game Reserve

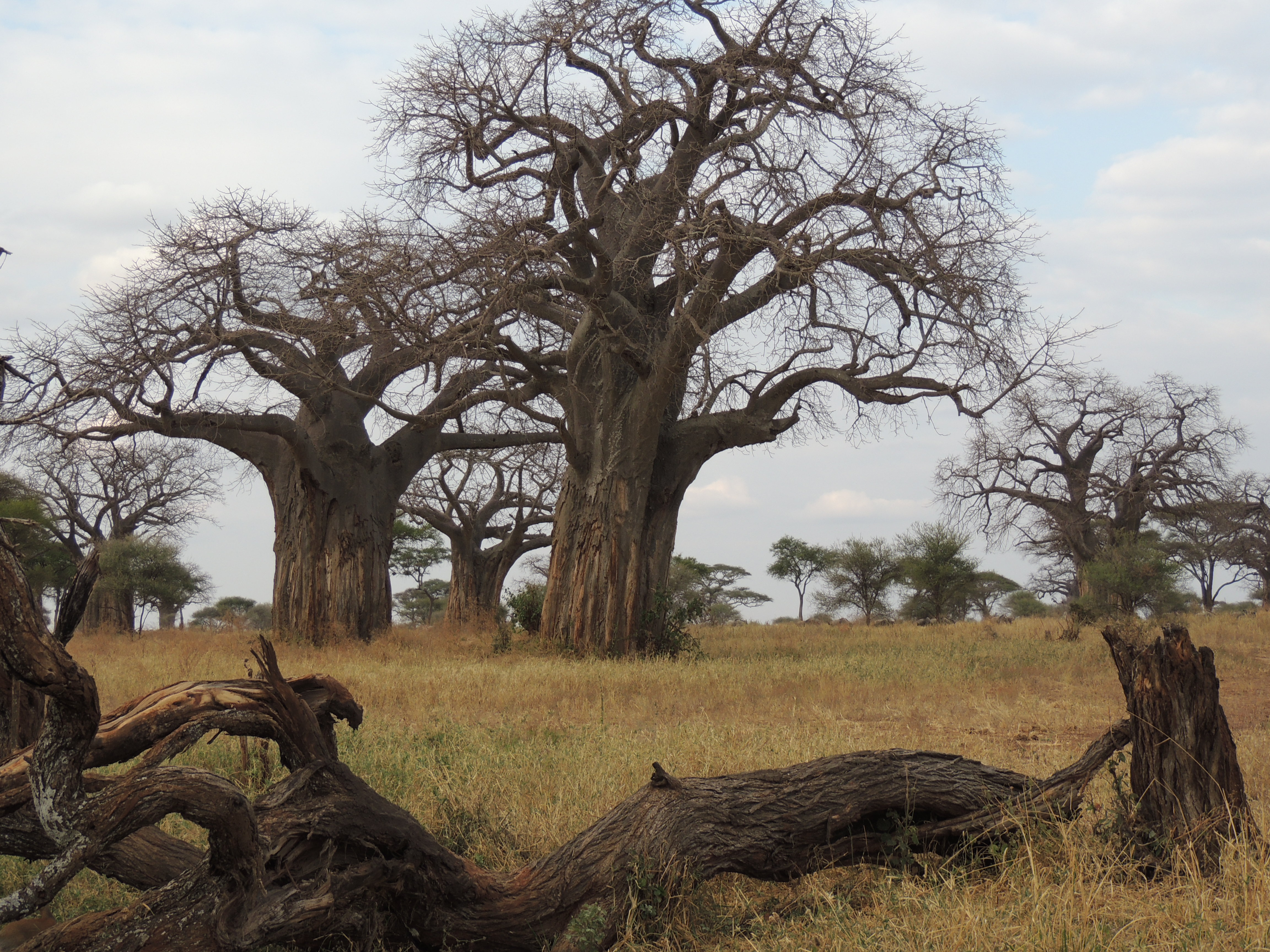
Without leaves in Tarangire National Park, Tanzania

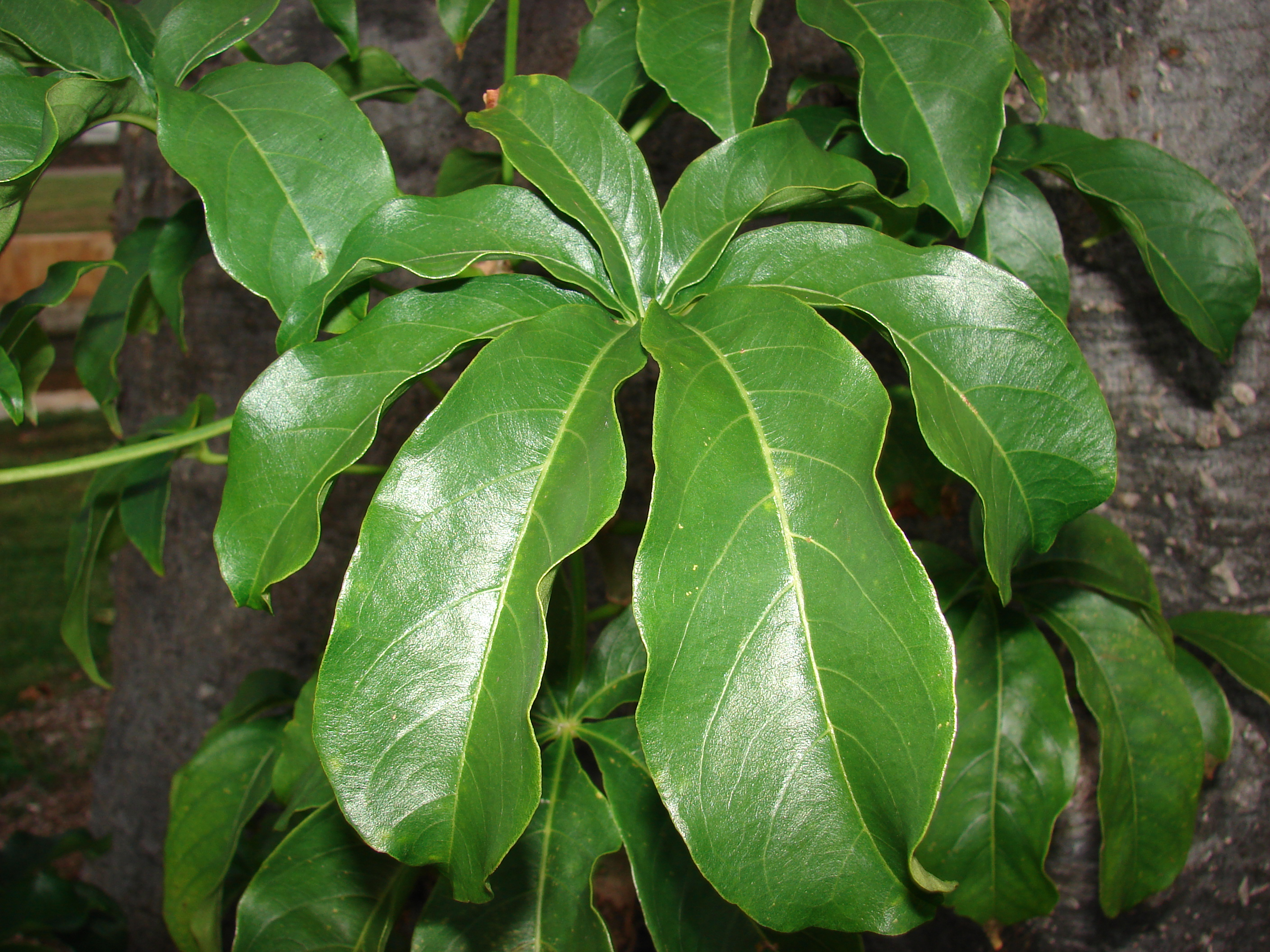
Leaves

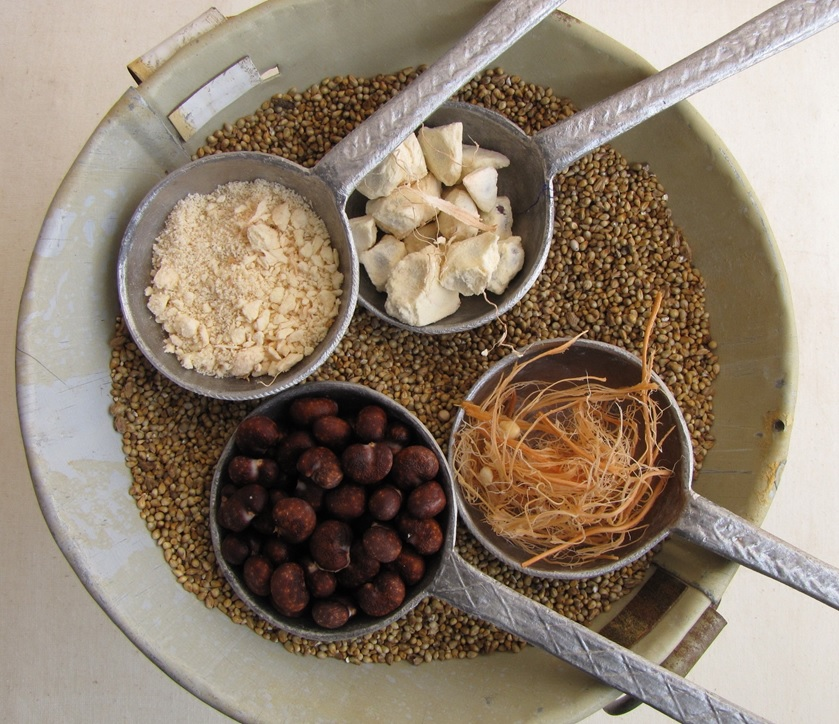
Elements of the fruit pulp (clockwise from top right): chunks, fibre, seeds, and pulp powder
