= Gabbur =

Village in India

- village
- gabbur
- Location in Karnataka, India Gabbur (India)
- Coordinates: 16°18′23.3″N 77°9′20″E
- Country: India
- State: Karnataka
- District: Raichur
- Taluk: Devadurga
- Talukas: Devadurga

Population (2001)
  - Total: 6,441

Languages
  - Official: Kannada
- Time zone: UTC+5:30 (IST)
- Postal code: 584 113
- Vehicle registration: KA 36

Gabbur also spelled as Gabburu is a village in the southern state of Karnataka, India. It is located in the Devadurga taluk of Raichur district in Karnataka.

== Demographics ==
As of 2001 India census, Gabbur had a population of 6441 with 3187 males and 3254 females.

== History ==
Gabburu is called the Temple town of Raichur District. There are as many as 30 temples and 28 rock edicts in the town. In ancient times, Gabbur was also known as Garbhapura and Gopuragrama.. Many of these temples were built during the reign of the Kalyani Chalukyas. Some of the prominent temples of Gabbur are the Hanuman, the Ishwara, the Venkateshwara, the Male Shankara, the Bangara Basappa, the Mahanandeeshwara, the Elu Bhaavi Basavanna and the Boodi Basaveshwara temple; there are several other temples in ruins.

== Transport ==
Gabbur is 30 km from District headquarters Raichur and 28 km from Taluka headquarters Devadurga. Gabbur lies on Karnataka State Highway 15, which connects Raichur to Devadurga. Raichur is the nearest large town to Gabbur. Raichur is well connected by road to Bangalore, Hubli, Hyderabad, Bagalkot and other major cities. The nearest major airport to Raichur and Gabbur is in Hyderabad.

== Long-distance bus routes ==
Karnataka State Road Transport Corporation (KSRTC) runs a bus service to other cities and villages. There are no private bus facility.

=== Railways ===
Raichur is the nearest railway station to Gabbur and Raichur is served by a major rail line and is well connected by trains to all major parts of India such as Bangalore, Mumbai, Delhi, Chennai, Hyderabad, Ahmedabad, Trivandrum, Kanyakumari, Pune, Bhopal and Agra.

== See also ==
- Maladkal
- Googal Village
- Devadurga
- Lingasugur
- Raichur
- Districts of Karnataka
