= Devadurga =

Devadurga may refer to:

- The Sanskrit name for Mount of God
- Devadurga, India, a town in Raichur district, Karnataka, India

== See also ==
- Devi Durga, a Hindu goddess
