= Jalhalli =

- Town
- Location in Karnataka, India Jalhalli (India)
- Coordinates: 16°21′54″N 76°46′52″E
- Country: India
- State: Karnataka
- District: Raichur
- Talukas: Devadurga

Population (2001)
  - Total: 10,381

Languages
  - Official: Kannada
- Time zone: UTC+5:30 (IST)

Jalhalli is a village in the southern state of Karnataka, India. It is located in the Devadurga taluk of Raichur district in Karnataka.

== Demographics ==
As of 2001 India census, Jalhalli had a population of 10,381 with 5,379 males and 5,002 females.

== See also ==
- Raichur
- Districts of Karnataka
