= Akalkumpi, Raichur =

Akalkumpi
- village
- Akalkumpi, Devadurga is in Raichur district
- Interactive map of Akalkumpi
- Coordinates: 16.207°N 76.871°E
- Country: India
- State: Karnataka
- District: Raichur
- Talukas: Devadurga

Government
  - Body: Village Panchayat

Languages
  - Official: Kannada
- Time zone: UTC+5:30 (IST)
- Nearest city: Raichur
- Civic agency: Village Panchayat

Akalkumpi, Devadurga is a village in the southern state of Karnataka, India. It is located in the Devadurga taluk of Raichur district.

== See also ==
- Raichur
- Districts of Karnataka
