= Sri Revanna Siddeshwara Swamy Temple =

Hindu temple in India

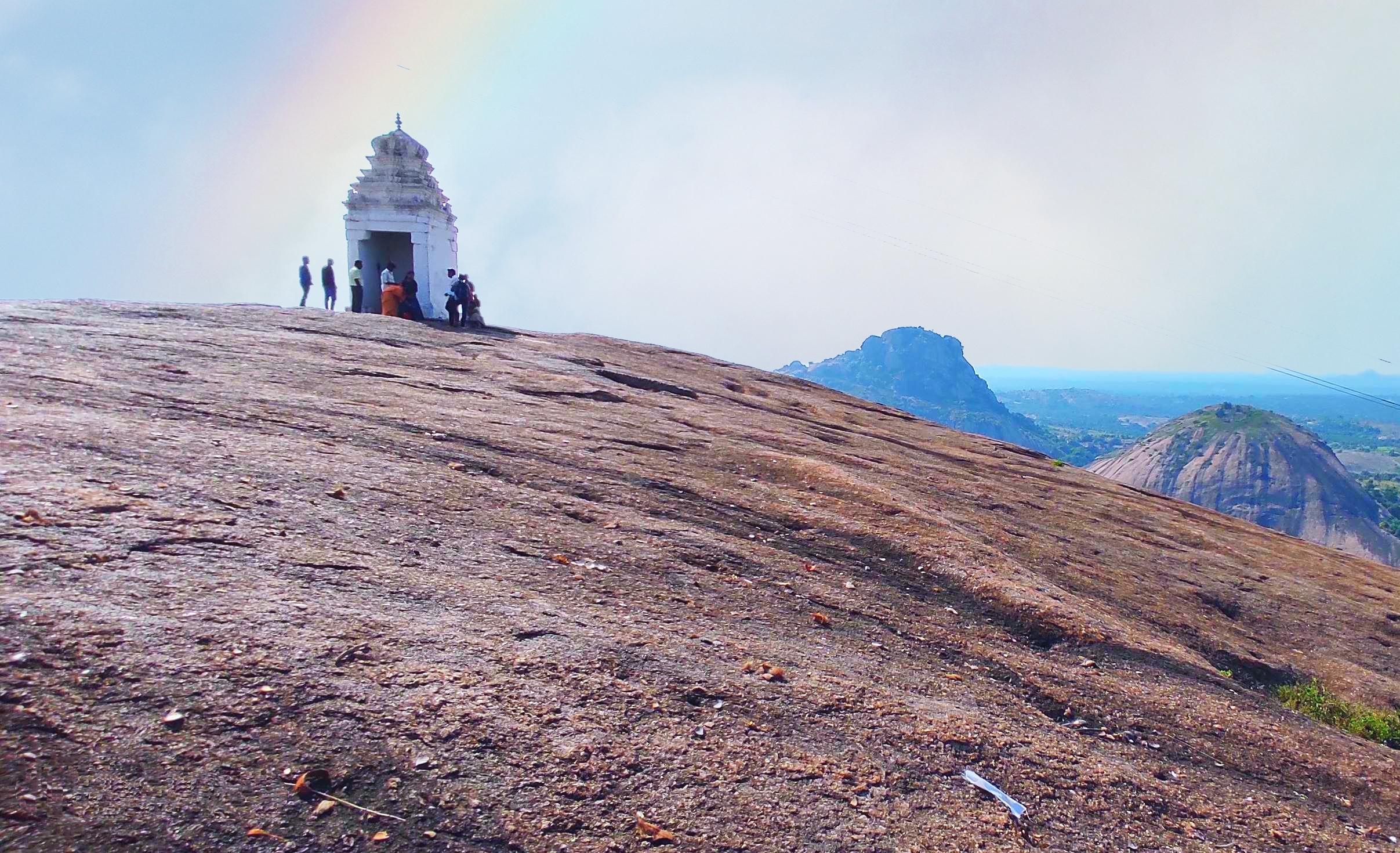
Revana Siddeshwara betta, Ramanagara

Sri Revanna Siddeshwara Swamy Temple is a Hindu pilgrimage centre situated in Karnataka State in India. It is located in Avverahalli village of Ramanagara taluk.

== Background ==
Sri Revanna Siddeshwara Swamy is regarded as one of the greatest Saints of the Shaiva Sect in the Hindu religion.

Sri Revana Siddeshwara is considered as a reincarnation of the great Jagadguru Shri Renukacharya who was ordered by Shiva to take incarnation on earth to spread Bhakti among the people.

With the blessings of Lord Shiva, Jagadguru Reṇukacharya (also known as Revaṇaradhya or Revaṇasiddha) was one of the five acharyas who came in the Kali Yuga to teach and preach Virasaivism. He is aforesaid to possess been born from the Somesvara linga, however, to possess traveled everywhere Asian nation to show Virasaivism. The Someshwara temple is located in Kollipaki.

Texts date this legendary saint to the time of the Ramayaṇa since he was the teacher of the nice sage Agastya of Panchavati. This saint is alleged to possess consecrated thirty million liṇgas at the bid of Ravaṇa's brother, Vibhiṣaṇa, once Ravaṇa's death.

He finally established the Rambhapuri maṭha. The Reṇuka gotra of the Virasaivas is known as once him.

As mentioned above Shri Revana Siddeshwara was the reincarnation of Great Jagadguru Shri Renukacharya. Thus, with the blessings of Lord Shiva, Renuka emerged from the Somashekhara linga close to Hyderabad's Kolli saakshi kshetra, and have become called Revana Siddeshwara.

According to Indian mythology, the lord preached “Patsala lingaanga saamarasya tatwat” to Agastya Maharshi. He also visited Sri Lanka as per Vibhishana's advice to King Ravana, he installed three crores of shivalingas. In this approach he even convinced many kings and emperors across Indian States to unfold shivabhakti.

Revana Siddeshwara, throughout his Mission Shivabhakti campaign, once lived on a mountain at Averahalli near Ramanagara in Karnataka. That place is even currently called a holy shivakshetra [Shiva place]. Finally once he was in kolli saakshi kshetra once more, as per lord Shiva's wish, he became lingaikya and reached Kailasa, the abode of Lord Shiva. The place wherever he did anushthaana in Avarehalli is understood as Revanasiddeshwara Betta (hill).

With a slogan "sarve janaha sukhino bhavanthu", Sri Revanna Siddeshwara is said to have performed penance at the cave hill. Sri Jagadguru Revana Siddeshwara traveled across the country and left many miracles in helping distressed, poor, and uneducated people.

== Temple ==
The temple is located on a massive monolithic stone hill in a hilly region.

The Full moon and New moon days are considered auspicious for worship and prayers. The main seva at the temple is Rudrabhisheka, which is sacred for Lord Shiva.

== Events ==
The temple holds festivals during Maha Shivaratri. Other important events are:

- Reniuka Jayanth
- Basava Jayanthi
- Jathra Mahotsava
- Maha Rathotsava
- Laksha Deepotsava

== See also ==
- Hinduism
