= Shivaraj Patil =

Indian judge (born 1940)

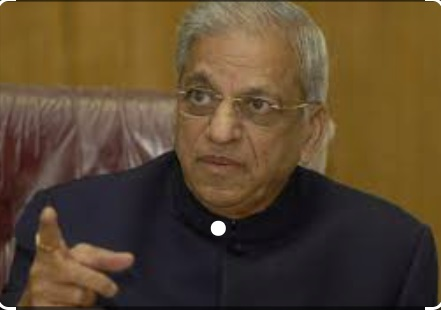

Justice of the Supreme Court of India
- In office 15 March 2000 – 11 January 2005

Chief Justice of the Rajasthan High Court
- In office 22 January 1999 – 2000

Chief Justice of the Madras High Court
- In office 28 December 1998 – 19 January 1999

Personal details
- Born: Shivaraj Virupanna Patil; 12 January 1940 (age 86) Maladkal, Raichur District, Kingdom of Mysuru, British India (present-day Karnataka, India)
- Children: Sharan Patil, Basava Prabhu Patil, Malati Patel

Shivaraj Virupanna Patil (born 12 January 1940) is a retired Indian judge who served as a justice of the Supreme Court of India from 2000 to 2005 and as chief justice of two High Courts of India.

== Career ==
Patil joined the bar in 1962, practising in Hyderabad until the late 1970s.

In 1990 he became a judge of the Karnataka High Court, transferring to the Madras High Court in 1994. He served as Chief Justice of the Madras High Court from late 1998 until becoming chief justice of the Rajasthan High Court in early 1999.

Patil was appointed a justice of the Supreme Court of India in March 2000, retiring in January 2005.

In 2006, he was appointed as an Acting Chairperson of National Human Rights Commission by Ministry of Home Affairs.

=== Post-judicial career ===
In July 2011, he was selected as Lokayukta of Karnataka State Government.

He has authored a book, munjaavigondu nudikirana, which was released on his 72nd birthday, 12 January 2012.

He has two sons, Basava Prabhu Patil Sr. Advocate practicing in Supreme court of India and Sharan Patil who is a doctor, heading Sparsh Hospital in Bangalore.
