= Madagiri =

Madagiri Madigiri
- Village
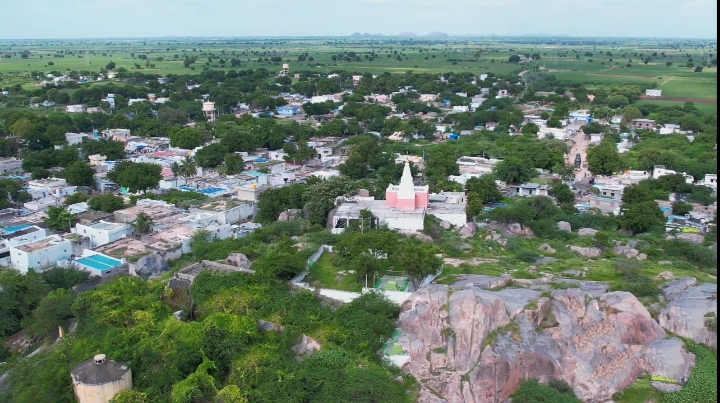
- Madagiri village from drone view

- Location in Karnataka Location in India
- Coordinates: 16.09°N 77.07°E
- Country: India
- State: Karnataka
- District: Raichur district
- Taluk: Sirwar

Government
  - Type: Panchayat raj
  - Body: Gram panchayat

Population (2001)
  - Total: 4,621

Languages
  - Official: Kannada
- Time zone: UTC+5:30 (IST)
- Postal code: 584129
- ISO 3166 code: IN-KA
- Vehicle registration: KA-36
- Website: karnataka.gov.in

Madagiri is also spelled as Madigiri or Madagera is a large village in the southern state of Karnataka, Madagiri is located in the Sirwar taluk of Raichur district in Karnataka. Madagiri is famous for the largest cotton growing village in the Raichur district.

== History ==
Mandal Panchayats were functioning before Gram Panchayats came into existence in Karnataka. Madagiri Mandal Panchayat is one of the many Mandal Panchayats in Karnataka. Madagiri, Halli Hosur, Chagabavi, Machanur, Ganadinni, Lakkadinni, Tupadur, Bommanala and Jalpur villages used to come under this Mandal Panchayat. Under the Panchayat Raj Act 1993, Madagiri Mandal Panchayat was terminated and is functioning instead as Madagiri Gram Panchayat.

== Demographics ==
As for the 2011 India census, Madagiri had a population of 4621 with 2332 females and 2289 males.

== Other places ==
1. Grama Panchayat Office Madagiri
2. Post Office Madagiri
3. Government Sub Centre Madagiri
4. Government Health and Wellness Center Madagiri
5. Government APMC Madagiri

== Schools and colleges ==
1. Government Model Higher Primary School Madagiri
2. Government Primary School Madagiri
3. Government Primary School Madagiri Camp
4. Jnana Jyothi Pre and Lower Primary School Madagiri
5. Prerana Pre and Lower Primary School Madagiri
6. Government High School Madagiri
7. Government Pre University College Madagiri

== See also ==
- Manvi
- Raichur
- Sindhanur
- Sirwar
