= Sirwar taluk =

Sirwar Sirawara
- Taluk
- Location within Karnataka Location within India
- Coordinates: 16°10′26″N 77°1′21″E
- Country: India
- State: Karnataka
- District: Raichur
- Established: 2017
- Elevation: 450 m (1,480 ft)

Population (2001)
  - Total: 15,975

Languages
  - Official: Kannada
- Time zone: UTC+5:30 (IST)
- PIN: 584129
- Telephone code: 08538
- Vehicle registration: KA-36

Sirwar, also spelled as Sirawara, is a taluk (previously a town under Manvi taluk) of the Raichur district in the state of Karnataka in India. Sirwar is one of the fastest-growing towns in Karnataka. It is famous for Paddy, Sona Mossurie Rice, and its litchi, which it exports in tonnes. It is the business center of almost 30 villages across the region.

== Geography ==
Sirwar is situated in the southern part of India and the northern part of Karnataka. Karnataka State Highway 20 (also called Raichur-Bagalakote Road) passes through Sirwar and is 36 km away from the district headquarters of Raichur, approximately 500 km from Bangalore. The highway belongs to the Raichur region.

The climate of the town is hot from March to mid-June and milder for the rest of the year. The town experiences cool nights and mornings during December–January.

Notable villages of Sirwar Taluk:

- Madagiri
- Kallur
- Kavital
- Bagalwad
- Attanur
- Mallata

== History ==
The name of the Sirwar (syn. siri-war) comes from Siri in Kannada Siri-Rich Place. The town is an economically rich place. According to some, Sirwar produces the world's best-quality rice.

== Food ==
The main food in the Sirwar is rice, though rotti/khadak (crispy) rotti, sajje rotti, chapathi, curries, and spicy chicken dishes are also found. Crops such as paddy, corn, cotton, pulses, and chilies are grown.

== Occupation ==
Agriculture is the main occupation, this place is being compared with Punjab, for its rich and modern agriculture. Retail and finance are also major businesses.

== Local festivities ==
There are several festivals throughout the year:

- Yellu Amavasya - The Yellu Amavasya festival is observed by farmers and is a form of thanksgiving to Mother Earth for a good harvest. An important ceremony on Yellu Amavasya day is the spraying of sesame and jaggery on agricultural lands. There is a belief that the sesame and jaggery are food for the worms in the farmland.
- rRamrRamzan
- AMBEDKAR jayanti
- CHRISTMAS
- Karnataka Rajyotsava
- Basava Jayanti
- Kanaka Jayanti
- GOOD FRIDAY
- Ugadi

== See also ==
- Raichur
- Districts of Karnataka
