= Big Tree at Victoria Falls =

Unusually large baobab tree in Zimbabwe

Coordinates: 17°54′45″S 25°50′28″E

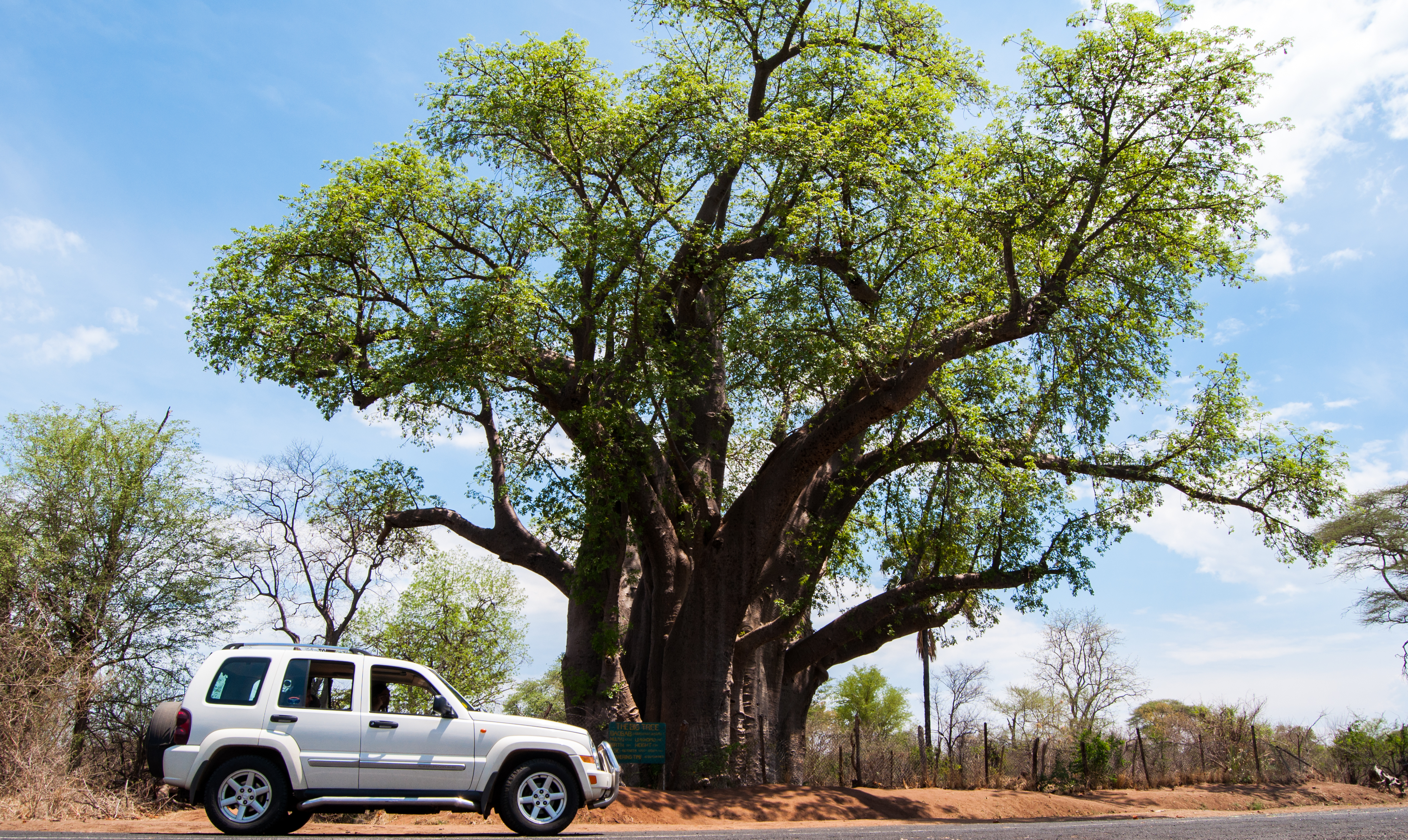
- Interactive map of Big Tree at Victoria Falls
- Species: Adansonia digitata
- Location: Victoria Falls, Zimbabwe

The Big Tree is a large baobab of the species Adansonia digitata situated close to Victoria Falls in Zimbabwe. It is unusually large for a baobab, measuring 22.40 meters (~73 ft) in girth and 24 meters (~79 ft) tall.

The explorer and missionary David Livingstone became the first European to observe Victoria Falls in 1854, naming the falls after Queen Victoria. While the Big Tree is sometimes referred to as Livingstone's Tree, Livingstone carved his name into a smaller baobab tree on Garden Island above the precipice of the waterfall.

The Big Tree grows roughly 2 km from the Zambezi River, Victoria Falls, and the island where Livingstone made landfall in a mokoro dugout canoe and wrote his records. This tree is possibly the oldest and biggest baobab in the world. Some similar trees were lost by the flooding further downstream that occurred when Kariba Dam was finished in 1956. Unlike the animals rescued and saved by Operation Noah during the flooding, the trees could not be relocated, and many were bulldozed so they would not become underwater hazards.

It is estimated that The Big Tree may be about 2,000 years old based on girth and growth ring data collected from other trees. That being said, it is thought to be much younger and may be made up of three separate tree trunks (or trees) due to its deep incisions.

== Conservation ==
The Big Tree is protected by National Museums and Monuments of Zimbabwe under whose jurisdiction it falls (not Zimbabwe Parks and Wildlife Management Authority). Over previous years name carvers have left their mark on the tree, leading to the erection of a fence to protect it from vandals.

== Other giants ==
There are a number of other huge baobabs in Zimbabwe that may be larger (but are not as well known). Some of them are;

- Three Giants in the Save Conservancy (two of which are called twins due to their close proximity to each other)
- One huge tree at Nkayi
- One in Gona-Re-Zhou National Park

Kapok trees, with swollen trunks and also members of the family Malvaceae and the same order, are the baobab's "New World" equivalents. Kapoks are mainly found in Peru and Brazil, South America. As introduced exotic trees flourish in Zimbabwe, some achieving great heights, probably taller than in their native habitats. There is one notable tree in Borrowdale Shopping Centre, Harare, and several (including a group of four) in the city parks of Mutare.
