= Watgal =

Watgal Vatagal
- Village
- Location within Karnataka Location within India
- Coordinates: 16°6′9.66″N 76°45′12.03″E
- Country: India
- State: Karnataka
- District: Raichur district
- Taluk: maski

Population
  - Total: 1,387

Languages
  - Official: Kannada
- Time zone: UTC+5:30 (IST)
- PIN: 584120
- Area code: 584 120
- Vehicle registration: KA-36

Watgal also spelled as Vatagal is a village near Kavital in the Maski taluk of Raichur district in the Indian state of Karnataka. Watgal is the location of a pre-historic period site. Baswanna Tempal Neolithic grey ware of Brahmagiri fabric and Jorwe fabric has been excavated in the village. Watgal is lies between Kavital and Lingasugur.

== Excavation ==
Excavation at Watgal was led by a collaborative team of archaeologists from the U.S. and the government of Karnataka. Surface studies and excavations produced black and red ware and pottery dating as far back as pre-historical times. Additionally, there were handmade red and grey wares, predominantly bowls and jars. Three burials were found, two infants and one adult. One infant was wrapped in a white fibrous material while the other was placed in two dull red wares. The adult had no associated artifacts and 12th century Hiremath and Hanuman temple is in same village.

== See also ==
- Maski
- Hatti
- Mudgal
- Jaladurga
- Raichur
- Districts of Karnataka
