= Koppur =

Village in Karnataka, India

Koppur, also known as Kopra, is a village in Devadurga Taluk in Raichur district, Karnataka State, India.

The village is famous for the temple of Lord Sri Narasimha Swamy. The nearest railway station is Raichur railway station.
