= James Chapman (explorer) =

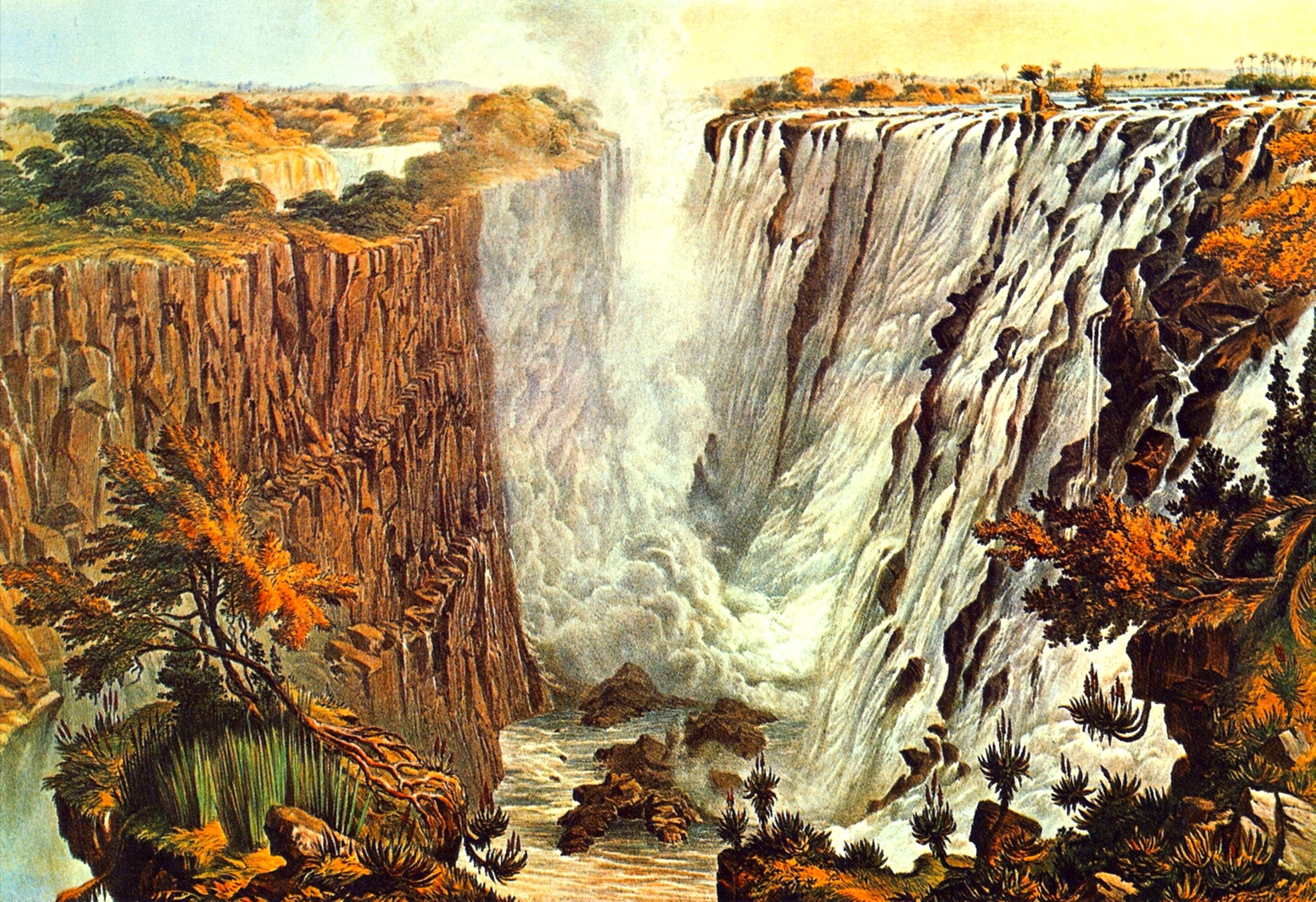
Victoria Falls Thomas Baines (1865)

James Chapman (27 December 1831, Cape Town – 4 February 1872, Kimberley), was an explorer, hunter, trader and photographer from the Cape Colony.

A son of James Chapman and Elizabeth Greeff of Malmesbury and brother to Henry Samuel Chapman, he was educated in Cape Town and left for Durban when 14 years old. He was appointed as chief clerk in the Native Affairs Department in 1848. A year later he settled in Potchefstroom where he became one of the first storekeepers. Shortly after, in 1852, he ventured across the Limpopo River and into Bamangwato country. He became friendly with Khama, one of the sons of Sekgoma, the Bamangwato chief, enlisting his aid in reaching the Chobe River. Early the following year found him on the Zambesi River which he explored to within 70 miles (110 km) of the Victoria Falls, almost beating David Livingstone to their discovery.

By 1854 he had teamed up with Samuel H. Edwards, another explorer, and launched an expedition to Lake Ngami after which he trekked through the territory between Northern Bechuanaland and the Zambesi. An easygoing man, he was able to get on with the Bushman hunters of the semi-desert interior and spent long periods in their company, obtaining valuable help from them. Returning to Ngami, he travelled north to the Okavango River, crossing Damaraland and reaching Walvis Bay. Here he busied himself with cattle-trading in Damaraland, before setting out on an expedition with his brother Henry and Thomas Baines and lasting from December 1860 to September 1864. Their aim was to explore the Zambesi from the Victoria Falls down to its delta, with a view to testing its navigability. However, these plans were bedevilled by sickness and misfortune. They did reach the Zambesi, but did not get to explore the mouth. On 23 July 1862 they reached the Victoria Falls. It was on this expedition that Baines painted many of his famous scenes which were reproduced in an album of prints. His attempt at exploring the Zambesi ruined his health and exhausted his finances. He returned to Cape Town in 1864, dispirited and fever-stricken. The expedition was notable since it was the first time that a stereoscopic camera had been used to record its progress. The size of the negatives was about 6 x 4.5 inches and of rather poor quality. Prints of these photographs are at the Africana Museum in Johannesburg.

Sir George Grey commissioned him to capture live animals and to compile glossaries of the Bantu languages. Chapman kept diaries throughout his journeys, but his Travels in the Interior of South Africa appeared only in 1868, shortly before his death. Chapman travelled at times with Francis Galton and C.J. Andersson. He attempted to farm at Anawood on the banks of the Swakop river in 1863 and 1864, but was forced to abandon his holding due to the Nama-Ovaherero War, in which he refused to become involved. From 1864 until 1870 he lived at various places in South Africa, but returned as a trader and hunter to Hereroland and Ovamboland between 1870 and 1871. He died at Du Toit's Pan near Kimberley, on 4 February 1872, aged 40 years.

== Family ==
In 1857 he married Catherine Cecelia Roome, daughter of Capt. William Roome, (master of the vessel "Olivia" on which Thomas Baines arrived at Cape Town on 23 November 1842) and Catherine Cecelia Bushnell (who was born in Virginia USA – her father, also a sea captain apparently settled in Nova Scotia). James and Catherine had four children.

One of their sons, William James Bushnell Chapman (1858–1932) became a trader, hunter and farmer. He came to Namibia as a child in 1864, spent ten years in Cape Town and returned on 16 June 1874 to Walvis Bay as assistant at Harrison's store. He traded and hunted in Ovamboland in 1875, then went to Angola in 1881 and farmed at Humpata. He finally resettled in 1928 with other Angola Boers in the Gobabis district of Namibia, where he died in October 1932.

Another son, Charles Henry Chapman, was born in Cape Town and boarded the Titanic at Southampton as a second class passenger (ticket number 248731, £13 10s). He carried with him the family bible belonging to his grandparents' family in Virginia and/or Nova Scotia; Chapman himself lived in The Bronx, NY. He died at age 52 of hypothermia and drowning after the sinking in the early hours of 15 April 1912; his body was later recovered by the Mackay-Bennett.

Henry Samuel Chapman (1834–1922), brother of James Chapman, arrived at Walvis Bay by sea in February 1860 and travelled extensively as a hunter and trader between Walvis Bay, Ovamboland, Hereroland, Lake Ngami and the Cape until 1863. He later lived at Oudtshoorn, Kimberley and Johannesburg, and died in August 1922 at Braamfontein in South Africa.
