= Lokapur =

Lokapur Lokapur
- village
- Location in Karnataka, India Lokapur (India)
- Coordinates: 16.1656°N 75.3660°E
- Country: India
- State: Karnataka
- District: Bagalkot
- Talukas: Mudhol

Government
  - Body: Gram panchayat

Population (2018)
  - Total: 100,878

Languages
  - Official: Kannada
- Time zone: UTC+5:30 (IST)
- ISO 3166 code: IN-KA
- Vehicle registration: KA
- Website: karnataka.gov.in

Lokapur is a village located in the northern part of southern Indian state of Karnataka. It is a part of the Mudhol taluk of Bagalkot district and belongs to Belagavi Division in Karnataka.

== Demographics ==
As of 2001 India census, Lokapur had a population of 10865 with 5444 males and 5421 females.

== See also ==
- Bagalkot
- Districts of Karnataka
