= Aminagad =

- Town
- Location in Karnataka, India Aminagad (India)
- Coordinates: 16.0572°N 75.9489°E
- Country: India
- State: Karnataka
- District: Bagalkot
- Talukas: Hungund

Population (2001)
  - Total: 13,593

Languages
  - Official: Kannada
- Time zone: UTC+5:30 (IST)

Aminagad is a village in the southern state of Karnataka, India. It is located in the Hungund taluk of Bagalkot district in Karnataka. Amingad is famous for its “Karadantu” (A nice tasty sweet). Karadantu is prepared using edible gum, dry fruits, sugar or jaggery. Amingad is also famous in cattle, Sheep, Lamb selling bazar in the state, bazar is on every Saturday, even sheep business from distant Tumukur and other parts of the state.

== Demographics ==
As of 2001 India census, Aminagad had a population of 13593 with 6837 males and 6756 females.

== Temples in Amingad ==
Banashankari Devi Temple Sanagmeshwara Temple Hanuman Temple on the Rock Mountain (Hill Top). Haadi Basavangudi and Veerabhadreshwar temple (near banashankari temple) Mangalammana Gudi Kalammana Gudi.

== General Information ==
Amingad PIN Code is 587112. Amingad Telephone Code / Std Code:08351

== See also ==
- Bagalkot
- Districts of Karnataka
- Aihole
