= Pigu, Ghana =

Coordinates: 9°58′52″N 0°49′27″W

Pigu is a community in the Savelugu-Nanton District in the Northern Region of Ghana. It is a populated community with nucleated settlement. People in the community are predominantly farmers.

== See also ==
- Suburbs of Savelugu-Nanton(Ghana) District
