= Kavital =

- Town
- Location within Karnataka Location within India
- Coordinates: 16°6′29.55″N 76°47′46.22″E
- Country: India
- State: Karnataka
- District: Raichur district
- Taluk: Manvi

Population (2001)
  - Total: 13,097

Languages
  - Official: Kannada
- Time zone: UTC+5:30 (IST)
- PIN: 584120
- Telephone code: 08538
- Vehicle registration: KA-36

Kavital is a town in the Sirwar taluk of Raichur district in Karnataka state, India. Kavital is 60 km west to the district headquarters Raichur and 35 km north to the taluka headquarters Manvi. Kavital lies on Karnataka State Highway 20. Nearest towns are Lingasugur and Raichur.

== Demographics ==
As of 2001 India census, Kovitala had a population of 13097 with 6607 males and 6490 females.

== Noted landmarks ==
Kavital is famous for the ancient Trayambakeshawar temple and Lallemashak darga. It is also famous for the fine quality of paddy. The famous Sri Venkateshwara rice industries is also situated here. A number of wind mills are also being established in this area . Temple belongs to 12th century, constructed by Vijayaraj.

== See also ==
- Salagunda
- Roudkunda
- Maski
- Kanakagiri
- Raichur
- Madagiri
