= Basava Jayanti =

Lingayat holiday

Basava Jayanthi is a holiday traditionally observed by the Lingayats of the Indian state of Karnataka. It marks the birthday of Basavanna, a 12th-century poet-philosopher and the founding saint of the Lingayat tradition. The holiday is celebrated throughout South India, primarily in Karnataka, Maharashtra, Telangana and Andhra Pradesh.

Basavanna believed in a society free of the caste system, with equal opportunity for all. He founded the Anubhava Mantapa, an academy which included Lingayat mystics, saints, and philosophers.
