= Kalmala =

- Village
- Location within Karnataka Location within India
- Coordinates: 16°11′52″N 77°12′22″E
- Country: India
- State: Karnataka
- District: Raichur district
- Taluk: Raichur

Population (2001)
  - Total: 5,797

Languages
  - Official: Kannada
- Time zone: UTC+5:30 (IST)
- Vehicle registration: KA-36

Kalmala is a village in the northeast of the state of Karnataka, India. It is located in the Raichur taluk of Raichur district in raichur-bagalkot highway, Karnataka.

== Demographics ==
As of 2001 India census, Kalmala had a population of 5797 with 2931 males and 2866 females.

== See also ==
- Raichur
- Districts of Karnataka
