= Devadurga, India =

Devadurga
- city
- Location in Karnataka, India
- Coordinates: 16°25′21″N 76°55′48″E
- Country: India
- State: Karnataka
- District: Raichur
- Lok Sabha Constituency: Raichur

Area
  - Total: 7.43 km^{2} (2.87 sq mi)
- Elevation: 398 m (1,306 ft)

Population (2020)
  - Total: 32,929
  - Density: 29.16/km^{2} (75.5/sq mi)

Languages
  - Official: Kannada
- Time zone: UTC+5:30 (IST)
- PIN: 584 111
- Telephone code: 08531
- ISO 3166 code: IN-KA
- Vehicle registration: KA 36
- Website: www.devadurgatown.gov.in

Devadurga is a city in the sub-district (Taluka) within the Raichur district of the Indian state of Karnataka.

== Demographics ==
The 2020 population of Devadurga is estimated to be 32,929. The population is 51% male and 49% female, with 17% under age 6. The literacy rate is 43%, below the national average of 59.9%.

== Sights ==
Devadurga has a 600-year-old baobab tree. An ancient fort is there. Kyadigera village also has an ancient fort. The Hazrat Zahiruddin Badshah Quadri Al-Jeelani Bagdadi Dargah is there. Jalahalli village has the Shree Laxmi Ranganatha temple and the Shri Jagadaradya Jayashanthlingeswar temple.

Koppur village, hosts the Sri Narasimha Swamy Temple, which is over a thousand years old. Benekal village hosts the Anegudi temple. ((ಮಾನಸಗಲ್ಲ್)) ಶ್ರೀ ಲಕ್ಷ್ಮೀ ರಂಗನಾಥಸ್ವಾಮಿ ದೇವಸ್ಥಾನವು ದೇವದುರ್ಗ ರಿಂದ 12 ಕೀ.ಮಿ ದೂರದಲ್ಲಿದೆ

== Transport ==
Road construction, which was scheduled to be completed in 2015, is designed to connect Devadurga to Bangalore, Hubli, Hyderabad, Bagalkot, and other major cities. The nearest major airport is in Hyderabad.

Karnataka State Road Transport Corporation (KSRTC) operates a bus service to other cities and villages. Private bus services are available.

=== Railways ===
Raichur is the nearest railway station. It is served by a rail line that connects the town with cities, including Bangalore, Mumbai, Delhi, Chennai, Hyderabad, Ahmedabad, Trivandrum, Kanyakumari, Pune, Bhopal, and Agra.
