= Manvi =

Manvi Bhattada Naadu and Daasara beedu
- City
- Location in Karnataka, India
- Coordinates: 15.9833°N 77.05°E
- Country: India
- State: Karnataka
- District: Raichur
- Lok Sabha Constituency: Raichur

Area
  - Total: 10 km^{2} (3.9 sq mi)
- Elevation: 361 m (1,184 ft)

Population (2001)
  - Total: 46,465
  - Density: 3,761.3/km^{2} (9,742/sq mi)
- Demonym: Manvian

Languages
  - Official: Kannada
- Time zone: UTC+5:30 (IST)
- PIN: 584 123
- Telephone code: 08538
- Vehicle registration: KA-36
- Website: www.manvitown.mrc.gov.in

Manvi or Mānvi is a City in the Raichur district of the Indian state of Karnataka. It is the municipal headquarters of the Manvi taluk. Manvi is governed by a municipal corporation.

== Geography ==
Manvi is located in the Raichur district of Karnataka State, India. It has an administrative-limits area of 10 square kilometers (3.86 square miles,) at an average elevation of 362 meters (1187 ft).

== Demographics ==
As of the 2011 India census, Manvi's population was 51% male and 49% female. The town has an average literacy rate of 47%, lower than the national average of 59.5%; male literacy is 55% and female literacy is 39%. In Manvi, 17% of the population is under six years old.

== Education ==
Loyola College, Manvi is based in Manvi.
