= Ramathnal =

Ramathnal Ramathnala
- Village
- Location within Karnataka Location within India
- Coordinates: 15°55′34.97″N 76°51′31.48″E
- Country: India
- State: Karnataka
- District: Raichur district
- Taluk: Sindhanur

Population (2001)
  - Total: 2,008

Languages
  - Official: Kannada
- Time zone: UTC+5:30 (IST)
- Telephone code: 08535
- Vehicle registration: KA 36

Ramathnal also spelled as Ramathnala is a village in the Sindhanur taluk of Raichur district in the Indian state of Karnataka. Ramathnal is located near to Pothnal stream joining Tungabhadra river. Ramathnal lies on road connecting Pothnal-Balganur.

== Demographics ==
As of 2001 India census, Ramathnal had a population of 2,008 with 1,004 males and 1,004 females and 392 Households.

== See also ==
- Banniganur
- Valkamdinni
- Yapalaparvi
- Olaballari
- Sindhanur
- Raichur
