= Banniganur =

Banniganur Banniganooru
- Village
- Location within Karnataka Location within India
- Coordinates: 15°55′15.67″N 76°52′34.51″E
- Country: India
- State: Karnataka
- District: Raichur district
- Taluk: Sindhanur

Population (2001)
  - Total: 1,461

Languages
  - Official: Kannada
- Time zone: UTC+5:30 (IST)
- Telephone code: 08535
- Vehicle registration: KA 36

Banniganur also spelled as Banniganooru is a village in the Sindhanur taluk of Raichur district in the Indian state of Karnataka. Banniganur is located near to Pothnal stream joining Tungabhadra river. Banniganur lies on road connecting Pothnal-Balganur. A

== Demographics ==
As of 2001 India census, Banniganur had a population of 1,461 with 715 males and 746 females and 256 Households.

== See also ==
- Ragalaparvi
- Valkamdinni
- Yapalaparvi
- Olaballari
- Sindhanur
- Raichur
