= Hedaginal =

Hedaginal Hedginal
- Village
- Location within Karnataka Location within India
- Coordinates: 15°48′18.95″N 76°58′20.11″E
- Country: India
- State: Karnataka
- District: Raichur district
- Taluk: Sindhanur

Population (2001)
  - Total: 1,470

Languages
  - Official: Kannada
- Time zone: UTC+5:30 (IST)
- Telephone code: 08535
- Vehicle registration: KA 36

Hedaginal also spelled as Hedginal is a village in the Sindhanur taluk of Raichur district in the Indian state of Karnataka. Hedaginal is located on the banks of Tungabhadra river. Hedaginal can be reached from Sindhanur via Olaballari and from Jawalagera via Timmapur.

== Demographics ==
As of 2001 India census, Hedaginal had a population of 1,470 with 736 males and 734 females and 256 Households.

== See also ==
- Yaddaladoddi
- Alabanoor
- Amba Matha
- Olaballari
- Sindhanur
- Raichur
