= Timmapur, Raichur district =

Timmapur Timmapura
- Village
- Location within Karnataka Location within India
- Coordinates: 15°49′37.45″N 76°52′36.05″E
- Country: India
- State: Karnataka
- District: Raichur district
- Taluk: Sindhanur

Population (2001)
  - Total: 2,342

Languages
  - Official: Kannada
- Time zone: UTC+5:30 (IST)
- Telephone code: 08535
- Vehicle registration: KA-36

Timmapur is a village in the Sindhanur taluk of Raichur district in the Indian state of Karnataka. Temple of Ayyappa swami is located in Timmapur. Timmapur lies on Jawalagera-Olaballari road.

== Demographics ==
As of 2001 India census, Timmapur had a population of 2,342 with 1,130 males and 1,212 females and 485 Households.

== See also ==
- Yaddaladoddi
- Alabanoor
- Amba Matha
- Olaballari
- Sindhanur
- Raichur
