= Giniwara =

- Village
- Location within Karnataka Location within India
- Coordinates: 15°45′59.07″N 76°55′6.3″E
- Country: India
- State: Karnataka
- District: Raichur district
- Taluk: Sindhanur

Population (2001)
  - Total: 2,498

Languages
  - Official: Kannada
- Time zone: UTC+5:30 (IST)
- Telephone code: 08535
- Vehicle registration: KA 36

Giniwara is a village in the Sindhanur taluk of Raichur district in the Indian state of Karnataka. Giniwara is located near to stream joining Tungabhadra river. Giniwara lies on Sindhanur-Olaballari route.

== Demographics ==
As of 2001 India census, Giniwara had a population of 2,498 with 1,244 males and 1,244 females and 405 Households.

== See also ==
- Salagunda
- Alabanoor
- Amba Matha
- Olaballari
- Sindhanur
- Raichur
