= Yapalaparvi =

Yapalaparvi Yapalparvi
- Village
- Location within Karnataka Location within India
- Coordinates: 15°54′35.99″N 76°53′39.55″E
- Country: India
- State: Karnataka
- District: Raichur district
- Taluk: Sindhanur

Population (2001)
  - Total: 1,216

Languages
  - Official: Kannada
- Time zone: UTC+5:30 (IST)
- Telephone code: 08535
- Vehicle registration: KA 36

Yapalaparvi also spelled as Yapalparvi is a village in the Sindhanur taluk of Raichur district in the Indian state of Karnataka. Yapalaparvi is located near to Pothnal stream joining Tungabhadra river. Yapalaparvi lies on road connecting Pothnal-Ayanur.

== Demographics ==
As of 2001 India census, Yapalaparvi had a population of 1,159 with 620 males and 596 females and 216 Households.

== See also ==
- Ragalaparvi
- Valkamdinni
- Puldinni
- Olaballari
- Sindhanur
- Raichur
