= Yaddaladoddi =

Yaddaladoddi Yeddaldoddi
- Village
- Location within Karnataka Location within India
- Coordinates: 15°48′31.6″N 76°54′39.4″E
- Country: India
- State: Karnataka
- District: Raichur district
- Taluk: Sindhanur

Population (2001)
  - Total: 1,885

Languages
  - Official: Kannada
- Time zone: UTC+5:30 (IST)
- Telephone code: 08535
- Vehicle registration: KA 36

Yadaaladoddi also spelled as Yeddaldoddi (Basava pura) is a village in the Sindhanur taluk of Raichur district in the Indian state of Karnataka. Virakta matha of Sri Siddalinga swamiji is located in Yaddaladoddi. Yadaladoddi lies on Jawalagera-Olaballari road.

== Demographics ==
As of 2001 India census, Yaddaladoddi had a population of 1,885 with 928 males and 957 females and 379 Households.

== See also ==
- Salagunda
- Alabanoor
- Amba Matha
- Olaballari
- Sindhanur
- Raichur
