= Badarli =

- Village
- Location within Karnataka Location within India
- Coordinates: 15°46′30.28″N 76°54′17.71″E
- Country: India
- State: Karnataka
- District: Raichur district
- Taluk: Sindhanur

Population (2001)
  - Total: 1,288

Languages
  - Official: Kannada
- Time zone: UTC+5:30 (IST)
- Telephone code: 08535
- Vehicle registration: KA 36

Badarli is a village in the Sindhanur taluk of Raichur district in the Indian state of Karnataka. It is located near the stream joining the Tungabhadra river. Badarli lies on the Sindhanur-Olanallari route. Badarli is the most literate village in the Raichur district, influencing by the MLA of the town.

== Demographics ==
As of 2001 India census, Badarli had a population of 1,288 with 534 males and 654 females and 223 Households.

== See also ==
- Salagunda
- Roudkunda
- Amba Matha
- Maski
- Sindhanur
- Raichur
