= Karatagi =

- Town
- Location in Karnataka, India
- Coordinates: 15.605586°N 76.658920°E
- Country: India
- State: Karnataka
- District: Koppal district

Government
  - Body: Town Municipal Council

Area
  - Total: 29.87 km^{2} (11.53 sq mi)
- Elevation: 460 m (1,510 ft)

Population (2024)
  - Total: 42,000
  - Density: 1,400/km^{2} (3,600/sq mi)

Languages
  - Official: Kannada
- PIN: 583229
- Telephone: 08533
- Vehicle registration: KA-37
- Website: www.karatagitown.mrc.gov.in

Karatagi is a town and taluk headquarters of Karatagi taluk and it is located in Koppal District in Karnataka, India. It is one of the most important commercial centres in the district. The town is made up of multiple paddy fields, which are irrigated by the Tungabhadra Canal. Karatagi is known for its numerous rice mills, which can be found in the town and the surrounding areas.

Karatagi is one of the seven towns that form the Koppal locale. It was initially formed when the Gangavathi taluk was separated into two new taluks along with Karatagi and Kanakagiri. The town is flanked by the Tungabhadra River to the east, Kanakagiri to the west, Sindhanur to the north, and Gangavathi to the south.

Karatagi is situated on State Highway 23, which connects Ginigera and Raichur through Gangavathi, Karatagi, Sindhanur, and Manvi. It is a part of the Gulbarga division and is 72 km east from the region's home office, Koppal. It is situated 20 km from Gangavathi and 362 km from the capital city, Bangalore. Karatagi lies among Gangavathi and Sindhanur. The PIN code 583229

Marlanahalli (4 km), Challur (6 km), Hulkihal (8 km), Siddapur (10 km) and Gundur (11 km) are villages near Karatagi. Karatagi is encircled by Sindhanur Taluk towards the north, Siruguppa Taluk towards the east, Hospet taluk towards the south, and Holagunda Taluk towards the east.

The encompassing territories are prone to flooding by waters from the left bank waterway of Tungabhadra Dam, which is administrated by Munirabad in Koppal locale, 70 km from Karatagi.

== Important villages ==
Karatagi has two hoblies for collecting tax and revenue: the Karatagi Hobli and the Siddapura Hobli.

The revenue-generating villages under the two hoblies are:

=== Karatagi Taluk ===
- Budugumpa
- Thondihala
- Chellur
- Juratagi
- Marlanahalli
- Hulkihala
- Yerdona
- Maylapura
- Thimmapura
- Halasamudra
- Hagedal
- Chellur camp
- Hagedal camp

=== Siddapura Hobli ===
- Nandihihalli
- Kakkaragola
- Shaliganuru
- Bennuru
- Ulenuru
- Jamapura
- Eeliganuru
- Kotnekal
- Baraguru
- Siddapura
- Krishnapura
- Gunduru
- Shinganala
- Kuntoji
- Musturu

== Economy ==
Agriculture is the primary source of income in Karatagi. As of December 2019, the Integrated Rice Technology Park is under construction at the Navali village. It is 13 km from Karatagi, which is one of the biggest rice technology parks in Asia. The park in Koppal district is being set up on 471 acres of land. The park plans to have exclusive zones for modern rice mills, value-added by-products, common facilities, warehousing, packing, a quality control lab, knowledge resource centre, and transportation.

== Transportation ==
=== Road transportation ===
There are state-run buses operated by Kalyana Karnataka Road Transport Corporation (KKRTC) and Karnataka State Road Transport Corporation (KSRTC) that offer routes to major towns and cities in Karnataka.

Karnataka's state capital city, Bengaluru, and major commercial hub of North Karnataka, Hubli are well connected by road to Karatagi. The town is also well connected to Hyderabad, Telangana's state capital city, by state buses from Karatagi. Neighboring towns and cities like Gangavathi, Koppal, Kanakagiri of Koppal district, Sindhanur, Manvi, Raichur of Raichur district, and Hosapete of Vijayanagara district are also well connected by the state buses from Karatagi.

Karnataka state highway-23 (Ginigera-Raichur) passes through Karatagi.

=== Rail transportation ===
Karatagi has a railway station that opened for commercial services on November 10 2021. It is part of the Ginigera - Raichur Railway line of Hubli railway division, South Western Railway Zone, Indian Railways. It is also on the Mahabubnagar-Munirabad railway line. It is connected to major towns like Hubli, Gadag, Koppal, Ballari, Tumakuru and Bengaluru. The nearest major railway stations are located in Karatagi (1.5Km), Gangavathi (25 km), Hospet (60 km), and Koppal (72 km).

=== Air transportation ===
Jindal Vijaynagar Airport (IATA:VDY) is the nearest airport, located approximately 80 kilometres from Karatagi in Toranagallu, Bellary. There is a single daily flight each to Bangalore and Hyderabad, operated by TruJet.

== Landmarks ==
A notable place of historic importance near Karatagi is Hampi, a UNESCO World Heritage Site, located 50 kilometres (31.1 mi) south of the town. It includes the Virupaksha Temple, stone chariot, Anegundi, gurus' tombs at Nava Brindavana and many more.
