= Valkamdinni =

Valkamdinni Walkamdinni
- Village
- Location within Karnataka Location within India
- Coordinates: 15°54′8.35″N 76°54′10.49″E
- Country: India
- State: Karnataka
- District: Raichur district
- Taluk: Sindhanur

Population (2001)
  - Total: 1,330

Languages
  - Official: Kannada
- Time zone: UTC+5:30 (IST)
- Telephone code: 08535
- Vehicle registration: KA 36

Valkamdinni also spelled as Walkamdinni is a village in the Sindhanur taluk of Raichur district in the Indian state of Karnataka. Valkamdinni is located near to Pothnal stream joining Tungabhadra river. Valkamdinni lies on road connecting Pothnal-Ayanur.

== Demographics ==
As of 2001 India census, Valkamdinni had a population of 1,330 with 665 males and 665 females and 256 Households.

== See also ==
- Ragalaparvi
- Pothnal
- Puldinni
- Olaballari
- Sindhanur
- Raichur
