= Udegolam =

Udegola Udegola
- Village
- Location within Karnataka Location within India
- Coordinates: 15°31′33″N 76°49′8″E
- Country: India
- State: Karnataka
- District: Bellary district
- Taluk: Siraguppa

Government
  - Type: Panchayat raj
  - Body: Gram panchayat

Languages
  - Official: Kannada
- Time zone: UTC+5:30 (IST)
- PIN: 583122
- ISO 3166 code: IN-KA
- Vehicle registration: KA 34
- Website: karnataka.gov.in

Udegola is a village in the Siraguppa taluk of Bellary district in Karnataka state, India.

== Demographics ==
Per the 2011 Census of India, Udegolam has a total population of 1523; of whom 761 are male and 762 female.

== Importance ==
Udegolam is famous for the minor edict of the emperor Ashoka found in the village.

== See also ==
- Maski
- Nittur, Siruguppa
- Nadivi
- Siraguppa
- Tekkalakote
- Bellary
