= Puldinni =

Puldinni Puladinni
- Village
- Location within Karnataka Location within India
- Coordinates: 15°52′48.4″N 76°56′6″E
- Country: India
- State: Karnataka
- District: Raichur district
- Taluk: Sindhanur

Population (2001)
  - Total: 1,954

Languages
  - Official: Kannada
- Time zone: UTC+5:30 (IST)
- Telephone code: 08535
- Vehicle registration: KA 36

Puldinni (also spelled) Puladinni is a village in the Sindhanur taluk of Raichur district in the Indian state of Karnataka. Puldinni is located near to Pothnal stream joining Tungabhadra river. Puldinni lies on road connecting Pothnal-Ayanur.

== Demographics ==
As of 2001 India census, Puldinni had a population of 1,954 with 998 males and 956 females and 319 Households.

== See also ==
- Ayanur
- Pothnal
- Hedaginal
- Olaballari
- Sindhanur
- Raichur
