= Ragalaparvi =

Ragalaparvi Ragalparvi
- Village
- Location within Karnataka Location within India
- Coordinates: 15°53′4.32″N 76°54′51.7″E
- Country: India
- State: Karnataka
- District: Raichur district
- Taluk: Sindhanur

Population (2001)
  - Total: 2,318

Languages
  - Official: Kannada
- Time zone: UTC+5:30 (IST)
- Telephone code: 08535
- Vehicle registration: KA-36

Ragalparvi, also spelled as Ragalparvi, is a village in the Sindhanur taluk of the Raichur district in the Indian state of Karnataka. Ragalaparvi is located near to Pothnal stream joining Tungabhadra river. Ragalaparvi lies on the road connecting Pothnal and Ayanur.

== Demographics ==
As of the 2001 Indian census, Ragalaparvi had a population of 2,318 with 1,133 males, 1,185 females, and 441 households.

== See also ==
- Ayanur
- Pothnal
- Puldinni
- Olaballari
- Sindhanur
- Raichur
