= Hubballi–Gangavathi Express =

Express train in Karnataka, India

Overview
- Service type: Express
- First service: 3 June 2019; 6 years ago
- Current operator: South Western Railways

Route
- Termini: Hubli Junction; Gangavathi
- Stops: 8
- Distance travelled: 165 km (103 mi)
- Average journey time: 4 hours
- Service frequency: Daily
- Train number: 17241 / 17242

On-board services
- Class: General
- Sleeping arrangements: No
- Catering facilities: No pantry car attached

Technical
- Rolling stock: ICF coach
- Track gauge: 1,676 mm (5 ft 6 in)
- Operating speed: 140 km/h (87 mph) maximum, 42 km/h (26 mph), including halts

Hubballi–Gangavathi Express is an Express train belonging to South Western Railway zone of Indian Railways that run between Hubli Junction and Gangavathi of Karnataka state in India.

== Background ==
This train was inaugurated on 3 June 2019 at Gangavathi railway station, flagged off by Karadi Sanganna Amarappa a BJP MP from Koppal (Lok Sabha constituency) and Paranna Munavalli a BJP MLA from Gangavathi for connectivity between the major commercial hub of North Karnataka-Hubli and rice bowl of Karnataka-Gangavathi of Karnataka State.

== Service ==
The frequency of this train is daily, it covers the distance of 165 km with an average speed of 42 km/h.

== Routes ==
This train passes through Gadag Junction and Ginigera Junction in both directions.

== Traction ==
As this route is currently going to be electrified, a WDP-4-based locomotive pulls the train to its destination on both sides.
