= Mukkunda =

Mukkunda Rakesh
- Village
- Location within Karnataka Location within India
- Coordinates: 15°36′21″N 76°49′2″E
- Country: India
- State: Karnataka
- District: Raichur district
- Taluk: Sindhanur

Population (2001)
  - Total: 3,111

Languages
  - Official: Kannada
- Time zone: UTC+5:30 (IST)
- PIN: 584167
- Telephone code: 08535
- Vehicle registration: KA-36

Mukkunda is a village in the Sindhanur taluk of the Raichur district in Karnataka, India. It is located on the banks of the Tungabhadra river. Mukkunda is famous for a Dargah of a Sufi saint called Hazrat syed sha Abdul Khadar Quadri who is a great grand son of Gouse al Azam .He came from Baghdad to this place via Ahmedabad ,phatri near Parbhani ,vijayapura and later settled down here .His lineage still exists in this village spreading the teaching of Islam .Devotees come across a large number for the Dargah visit and it’s very popular with this it also have several ancient temples, including the Sri Rama mandir shri dhurgamma temple, the Murari Ranga, and the Baajeshwara. The Tungabhadra river surrounds an Eshwara temple built in Hoysala style during the Sindha dynasty. A Sufi saint, hazrat gadde Khadar Bhasha darga Mukkunda is well known, and many visitors from surrounding village will come to take the blessings of this saint. It is and 27 km from Karnataka State Highway 19. The nearest towns are Siruguppa and Karatagi. Mukkunda is well known for Dargah Shareef and Krishna temple .

== Demographics ==
As of 2001 India census, Mukkunda had a population of 3,111 with 1,571 males and 1,540 females and 590 Households.

== See also ==
- Salagunda
- Maski
- Kanakagiri
- Raichur
