= Ayanur =

Ayanur Ayanooru
- Village
- Location within Karnataka Location within India
- Coordinates: 15°50′27.68″N 77°0′53.68″E
- Country: India
- State: Karnataka
- District: Raichur district
- Taluk: Sindhanur
- Named for: Moharram

Population (2001)
  - Total: 1,487

Languages
  - Official: Kannada
- Time zone: UTC+5:30 (IST)
- Telephone code: 08535
- Vehicle registration: KA 36

Ayanur also spelled as Ayanooru or Ainur is a village in the Sindhanur taluk of Raichur district in the Indian state of Karnataka. Ayanur is located on the banks of Tungabhadra river. Ayanur can be reached via Pothnal, Hedaginal and also via Olaballari.

== Demographics ==
As of 2001 India census, Ayanur had a population of 1,487 with 743 males and 744 females and 271 Households.

== See also ==
- Salagunda
- Pothnal
- Hedaginal
- Olaballari
- Sindhanur
- Raichur
