= Hitnal railway station =

Railway station in Karnataka, India

Hitnal

General information
- Location: Hitnal, Koppal district, Karnatak; India
- Coordinates: 15°20′08″N 76°17′29″E
- Elevation: 490 metres (1,610 ft)
- System: Indian Railways station
- Owner: Indian Railways
- Operator: South Western Railway zone
- Line: Guntakal–Vasco da Gama line
- Platforms: 1
- Tracks: Double Electric-Line

Construction
- Structure type: Standard (on ground)

Other information
- Status: Functioning
- Station code: HTNL
- Zone(s): South Western Railway zone
- Division(s): Hubballi

Services
Preceding station	Indian Railways	Following station
Munirabad towards ?	South Western Railway zone Guntakal–Vasco da Gama section	Ginigera Junction towards ?
Location
- Interactive map

Hitnal railway station is a railway station located on the Guntakal–Vasco da Gama line operated by the South Western Railway zone under Hubballi railway division. It is situated at Hitnal in Koppal district in the Indian state of Karnatak.
