= Dasanur =

Deshnoor
- Jungle
- Location in Karnataka, India Deshnoor (India)
- Coordinates: 15.63°N 76.90°E
- Country: India
- State: Karnataka
- District: Bellary
- Talukas: Siruguppa

Population (2001)
  - Total: 6,176

Languages
  - Official: Kannada
- Time zone: UTC+5:30 (IST)
- ISO 3166 code: IN-KA
- Vehicle registration: KA
- Website: karnataka.gov.in

Dasanur is a village in the southern state of Karnataka, India. It is located in the Siruguppa taluk of Bellary district in Karnataka.

== Demographics ==
As of 2001 India census, Dasanur had a population of 6176 with 3070 males and 3106 females.

== See also ==
- Bellary
- Districts of Karnataka
