= Siddapur =

Siddapur, Sidapur, Siddapura, or Sidapura are names of a number of towns, villages and administrative divisions in India. They include;

- Siddapura, Uttara Kannada
  - Siddapur taluk, an administrative region of Uttara Kannada
- Siddapur, Savanur taluk, Haveri
- Siddapura, Bangalore
- Siddapur, Belgaum, Karnataka
- Siddapur, Bagalkot, Bilagi Taluka, Bagalkot district, Karnataka
- Siddapura, Kodagu, Karnataka
- Siddapur, Koppala, Karnataka
- Siddapura, Udupi, Karnataka
- Siddapur, Vijayapur

== See also ==
- Sidhpur, Gujarat
