= Papanashi =

- Village
- Location within Karnataka Location within India
- Coordinates: 15°22′1″N 75°40′46″E
- Country: India
- State: Karnataka
- District: Gadag district
- Lok Sabha Constituency: Haveri

Languages
  - Official: Kannada
- Time zone: UTC+5:30 (IST)
- Telephone code: 582 103
- Vehicle registration: KA 26

Papanashi is a village in the Gadag district of the Indian state of Karnataka. Papanashi is famous for the ancient Kalmeshwara Temple located in the village.

== Demographics ==
Per the 2011 Census of India, Papanashi has a total population of 1296; of whom 620 are male and 676 female.

== See also ==
- Gadag
- Munirabad
- Hampi
- Koppal
- Karnataka
