= Roudkunda =

- Village
- Location within Karnataka Location within India
- Coordinates: 15°40′38.73″N 76°46′31.29″E
- Country: India
- State: Karnataka
- District: Raichur district
- Taluk: Sindhanur

Languages
  - Official: Kannada
- Time zone: UTC+5:30 (IST)
- PIN: 584128
- Telephone code: 08535
- Vehicle registration: KA-36

Roudkunda is a village in the Sindhanur taluk of Raichur district in the southern state of Karnataka, India. Roudkunda is famous for Ranganatha swamy temple. Roudkunda is surrounded by hills and there is an ancient fort on the hill top belonging to 16th century. There are various relics found in the hills that have historical importance. Roudkunda is 18 km south to the taluka headquarters Sindhanur and 5 km from Karnataka State Highway 23. Nearest towns are Siruguppa and Karatagi.

== Demographics ==
As of 2001 India census, Roudkunda had a population of 7982 with 3960 males and 4022 females.

== See also ==
- Salagunda
- Mukkunda
- Maski
- Kanakagiri
- Raichur
- Raichur
- Districts of Karnataka
