= Sindhanur railway station =

Train station in Karnataka, India

Sindhanur Railway Junction Sindhanur
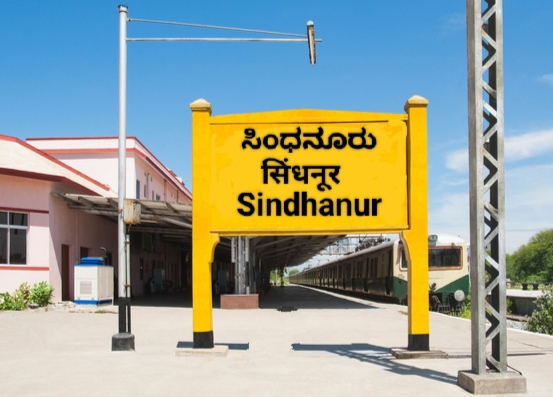
- Sindhanur railway station board

General information
- Location: Sindhanur, Karnataka; India
- Coordinates: 15°45′24″N 76°46′05″E
- Elevation: 406 metres (1,332 ft)
- System: Indian Railways junction station
- Owner: Indian Railways
- Operator: South Western Railway
- Lines: Ballari-Vijayapur section Mahabubnagar-Munirabad line
- Platforms: 2
- Tracks: 2

Construction
- Structure type: Standard on ground
- Parking: Yes
- Cycle facilities: Yes

Other information
- Status: Active
- Station code: SNNR
- Zone(s): South Western Railway zone
- Division(s): Hubli railway division

History
- Electrified: Ongoing
Location
- Location within Karnataka Location within India

Sindhanur Railway Station (station code: SNNR) falls under Hubli railway division of the South Western Railway in Raichur District, Karnataka, India. Sindhanur railway station inaugurated on 15th March 2024. It has three platforms which serve mainly Sindhanur City and nearby heritage tourist places of historic importance.

== Description ==
New line is constructing from Ginegera (Koppala district) to Mahaboob Nagar via Gangavathi, Sindhanur, Manvi and Raichur. First phase Ginigera to Raichur estimated to complete in 2025.
