= Sirigeri =

- village
- Location in Karnataka, India Sirigeri (India)
- Coordinates: 15.63°N 76.90°E
- Country: India
- State: Karnataka
- District: Ballari
- Talukas: Siruguppa

Government
  - Body: Gram panchayat

Population (2001)
  - Total: 10,122

Languages
  - Official: Kannada
- Time zone: UTC+5:30 (IST)
- ISO 3166 code: IN-KA
- Vehicle registration: KA
- Website: karnataka.gov.in

Sirigeri is a village in the southern state of Karnataka, India. It is located in the Siruguppa taluk of Ballari district in Karnataka. Here Historical and Powerful Lord Sri Naganatheshwara, Lord Sri Parvatha Matha and Lord Sri Mano Siddi Vinayaka Temples and Sri Sirigeramma Temple are located.Historical place

== Demographics ==
As of 2001 India census, Sirigeri had a population of 10122 with 5084 males and 5038 females.

== See also ==
- Bellary
- Districts of Karnataka
