= Hitnal =

Village in India

- Village
- Location within Karnataka Location within India
- Coordinates: 15°20′19.03″N 76°17′40.01″E
- Country: India
- State: Karnataka
- District: Koppal district
- Taluk: Koppal

Population (2001)
  - Total: 4,762

Languages
  - Official: Kannada
- Time zone: UTC+5:30 (IST)
- Telephone code: 08539
- Vehicle registration: KA 37

Hitnal is a village near Munirabad in the Koppal taluk of Koppal district in the Indian state of Karnataka. Hitnal is located east to District Headquarters Koppal.

== Demographics ==
As of 2001 India census, Hitnal had a population of 4,762 with 2,377 males and 2,385 females and 873 Households.

== Transportation ==
Hitnal railway station is situated at Hitnal on Guntakal–Vasco da Gama line.

== See also ==
- Gangavathi
- Kukanapalli
- Kushtagi
- Hospet
- Koppal
