= Basavarajeshwari Camp =

Village in Karnataka, India

Coordinates: 15.699193°N 76.696887°E

Basavarajeshwari Camp is a village in Sindanur Taluka, Karnataka, India. It is located beside a canal that provides water to three ponds. One stores drinking water for the villagers, and the other two provide water for lands for paddy and wheat cultivation.
