= Nadivi =

- Village
- Location within Karnataka Location within India
- Coordinates: 15°30′11″N 76°48′29″E
- Country: India
- State: Karnataka
- District: Bellary district
- Taluk: Siraguppa

Government
  - Body: Gram panchayat

Languages
  - Official: Kannada
- Time zone: UTC+5:30 (IST)
- PIN: 583122
- ISO 3166 code: IN-KA
- Vehicle registration: KA 36
- Website: karnataka.gov.in

Nadivi is a village in the Siraguppa taluk of Bellary district in Karnataka state, India.

== Demographics ==
Per the 2011 Census of India, Nadivi has a total population of 3277; of whom 1648 are male and 1629 female.

== Importance ==
Nadivi is famous for the Ancient fort located in the village.

== See also ==
- Maski
- Siraguppa
- Tekkalakote
- Bellary
