= Marlanahalli =

Village in India

- village
- Country: India
- State: Karnataka
- District: Koppal
- Talukas: Karatagi

Government
  - Body: Gram panchayat

Population (2001)
  - Total: 5,234

Languages
  - Official: Kannada
- Time zone: UTC+5:30 (IST)
- ISO 3166 code: IN-KA
- Vehicle registration: KA
- Website: karnataka.gov.in

Marlanahalli is a village in the southern state of Karnataka, India. It is located in the Karatgi taluk of Koppal district in Karnataka.

== Demographics ==
As of 2001 India census, Marlanahalli had a population of 5234 with 2628 males and 2606 females.

Sri Venkateshwara swamy, Saibaba temple complex, Anjaneya swamy temples are famous in Maralanahalli Govt Primary School which is established in 1979. Tungabhadra canal which is in the middle of the village

== See also ==
- Koppal
- Districts of Karnataka
