= Kenchanagudda =

- Village
- Location in Karnataka, India Kenchanagudda (India)
- Coordinates: 15°33′N 76°54′E
- Country: India
- State: Karnataka
- District: Ballari

Languages
  - Official: Kannada
- Time zone: UTC+5:30 (IST)
- Nearest city: Siruguppa

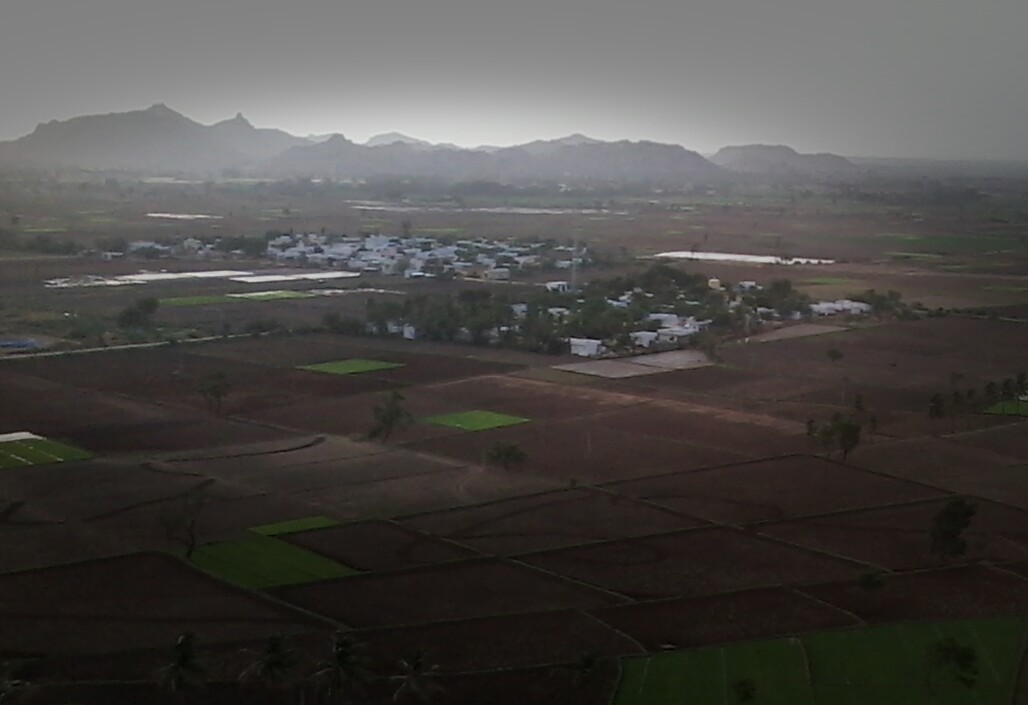
A view of Kenchanagudda from the top of a hill

Kenchanagudda is a village in the southern state of Karnataka, India. The village is located in the Siruguppa taluk of Ballari district.

== Tourism ==
The River Tungabhadra flows through this village, branching into seven streams. There are also seven kattes (platforms constructed of stones around a wide tree where a group of people sit and talk). The place is surrounded by more than a dozen hills.

On the bank of the river, there is a vrindavana (holy grave of Hindu saints, especially of those belonging to a matha or parampara) of Sri Vasudhendra teertha, who is the great-grandson of Sri Raghavendra Swami. The Raghavendra mutt of Mantralayam administers the vrindavana. This place attracts Brahmin tourists from all over Karnataka. Every year, on the sixth, seventh and eighth days (namely shashthi, saptami and ashtami) of the ashvayuja mãsa of the Hindu calendar, the aãradhane (anniversary of the day on which the saint entered the vrindavana alive) of Sri Vasudhendra teertha swamy is held in kenchanagudda.

The river here is known for its scenery. A song from the Kannada film Maanasa Sarovara titled Chanda Chanda was shot here. Remains from the era of the Vijayanagara Empire can be found around the village.

Additionally, there is a hydro-electric power plant located across one of the seven branches of the river.

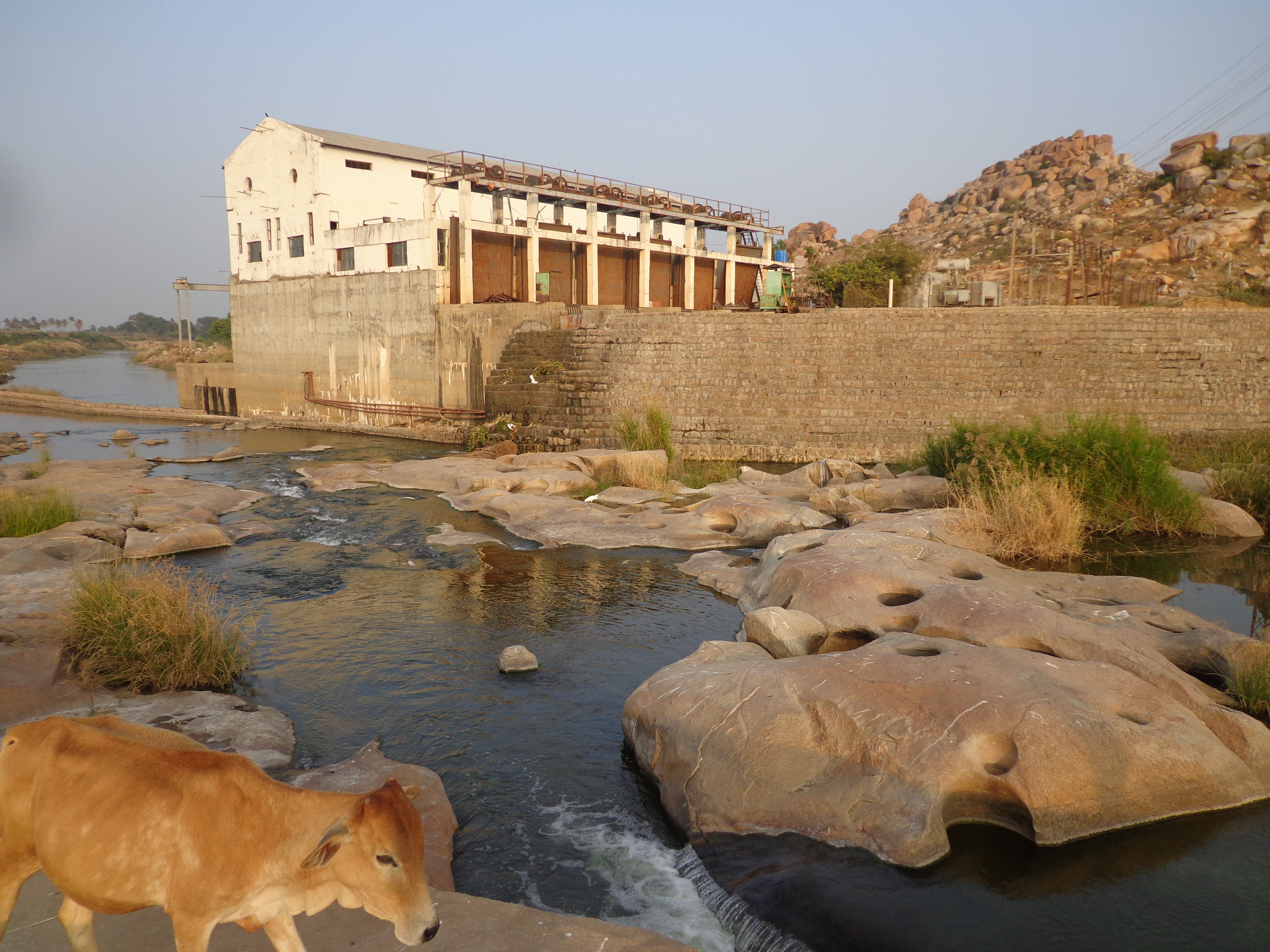
Hydro-electric power plant at Kenchanagudda

== See also ==
- Bellary
- Districts of Karnataka
- Siruguppa
- River Tungabhadra
- Sri Raghavendra Swami
