= Tekkalakote =

- Town
- Location in Karnataka, India
- Coordinates: 15°32′5.11″N 76°52′42.46″E
- Country: India
- State: Karnataka
- District: Ballari

Area
  - Total: 46.13 km^{2} (17.81 sq mi)
  - Rank: 1
- Elevation: 401 m (1,316 ft)

Population (2011)
  - Total: 26,224
  - Density: 511.12/km^{2} (1,323.8/sq mi)

Languages
  - Official: Kannada
- Time zone: UTC+5:30 (IST)
- PIN: 583 122
- Telephone code: 08395
- Website: http://www.tekkalakotetown.gov.in

Tekkalakote, also known as Tekkalakota, is a Panchayat town and Pre-historic Neolithic site in Siruguppa taluk of Ballari district in the Indian state of Karnataka.

== Demography ==
As of 2001 India census, Tekkalakote had a population of 23,536. Males constitute 52% of the population and females 48%. Tekkalakote has an average literacy rate of 30%, lower than the national average of 59.5%. Literacy of males and females are 41% and 25% respectively. The town's literacy percentage is increasing gradually.

== Administration ==
Tekkalakote is revenue hobli, also town panchayat, executive head is Chief officer. It consists of 20 wards, elections for the same are held every five years to choose ward cousellors, later president and vice president elected among themselves. Devinagara a small camp at a distance of 2 km, comes under direct Tekkalakote administration.

== Law and order ==
Tekkalakote is circle in police administration. Offices of Circle inspector, & Police sub inspector present in town, and both are located in same place in town outskirts on the main highway NH150A. Sirigeri police station comes under jurisdiction of Tekkalakote circle. Chances of communal violence during Muharram & Ganesh Chaturthi are being effectively controlled by Police staff during their occurrence.

== Religion and Caste ==
Major religions here are Hindu and Islam, with Christianity having a minute presence. Major castes of the town are Nayaka/Valmiki, Pinjar/Nadaf, Kuruba, lingayath, Vokkaliga, etc.

== Education ==
Education is provided by both government and private institutions in many numbers. Govt. PU college for arts and science streams is available, and Govt. first grade degree college provide undergraduate education in humanities.

== Agriculture and Veterinary ==
Tekkalakote is one of the major paddy-growing towns in the district of Ballari. It also has three rice mills. Major crops grown here are paddy and cotton, while Foxtail millet, bajra, jowar, and maize are grown as minor crops. Agriculture lands are irrigated and rain-fed. Karnataka state department of Agriculture(KSDA) has its sub office here as Raitha Samparka Kendra (RSK) which works for upliftment of agriculture and farmers of villages of Tekkalakote hobli.

Veterinary hospital is established to serve animal health issues and their improvement.

== Historic importance ==
Tekkalakote is a pre-historic neolithic site and has shown an evidence of elaborate gold ear ornaments.

Tekkalakote hill has evidence of pre-historic neolithic rock paintings in India along with Kupgal, Piklihal, Lakhudiyar, Bhimbetka, & Jogimara. Various relics of Neolithic age rock drawings also found here.

Tekkalakote is also known for the 18th century square-shaped fort.

Nittur & Udegolam villages, which are well known for the minor edicts of the Mauryan emperor Ashoka are located at a distance of 5–7 km from this town. The town holds the most populous and commercial status in its Siruguppa taluk.

== Transport ==
Tekkalakote is located in between Ballari and Siruguppa. It is 45 km away from Ballari and 11 km from Siruguppa. Tekkalakote lies on NH150A which runs between Jevargi and Chamarajanagara. The town is well connected by road to Bangalore, Gulbarga, Hyderabad, and other major cities. The nearest airport is in Vidyanagar, Ballari, currently which connects to Bengaluru and Hyderabad.

=== Long-distance bus routes ===
Karnataka State Road Transport Corporation (KSRTC) runs bus services to other cities and villages. Private transport facilities are also available.

=== Railways ===
Bellary Junction is the nearest railway station, at a distance of 45 km from this town, & Karatagi station at a distance of 70 km.

== Languages ==
Kannada and Hindi are the majorly spoken languages and Telugu holds a minute place.

== Temples ==
Tekkalakote is one of the famous religious hub in Siruguppa taluk. It has many old temples and are of hundreds of years old. These are some of the famous Temples (Devasthana) in Tekkalakote:

- Varavina Malleshwar Devasthana (Popularly known as Mallayyana Gudi)
- Kadasiddeshwara Devasthana
- Nela Amareshwara Devasthana
- Jade Shankara linga Devasthana
- Nagareshwara Devasthana
- Neelakanteshwara Devasthana
- Siddarameshwara Devasthana
- Kaalamma Devasthana
- Dyavamma Devasthana
- Pete Basaveswara Gudi
- Sharana Basaveswhwara Kalyana Mantapa'
- Beeralingeshwar temple
- Kote Eshwara Temple
- Huchirappa Temple

== Hospitals ==
Tekkalakota has a government hospital on the main highway road. The town also has many private doctors and medical stores.

Tekkalakota is also has Ayurvedic treatment practiced by some of the elder people and some doctors. Some Ayurvedic doctors provide the treatment based on the experience in this field which they got from their ancestors.

== Political parties ==
Major Political parties are Indian National Congress (Congress), Bharatiya Janata Party (BJP), and Janata Dal (Secular). This town comes under Siruguppa Assembly constituency and Koppal Lok Sabha constituency. Mr. M.S.Somalingappa, three time serving MLA of Siruguppa legislative assembly, is from this town.

== See also ==
- Nittur, Siruguppa
- Udegolam
- Nadivi
- Siruguppa
- Bellary
- Hunasagi
- Piklihal
