= Challur =

- Village
- Location within Karnataka
- Country: India
- State: Karnataka
- District: Koppal district
- Taluk: Karatagi
- Assembly constituency: Kanakagiri

Population (2011)
  - Total: 4,972
- Time zone: UTC+5:30 (IST)
- PIN: 583229
- Telephone code: 08533
- Vehicle registration: KA-37

Challur is a village in the Karatagi taluk of Koppal district in the southern state of Karnataka, India. Challur is situated near Karatagi.

Challur is a gram panchayat and is located on either sides of Tunga bhadra left Bank Canal,#36. It has many paddies that are highly fertile & higher yielding type.

Rice is the main agricultural crop in the Tunga Bhadra Delta Region. It is mainly exported to Bangalore, Chennai, Maharashtra & Middle-East countries. Tractors, rice harvesters, and pesticide sprayers are just a few examples of the cutting-edge agricultural machinery used in the cultivation process. In this village, most of the farmers have their own tractor. Challur has many Hindu temples.

== Demographics ==
As of 2011, there are a total of 1018 families residing in Challur. The Challur village has population of 4972, of which 2469 are males, while 2503 are females.

Children make up 13.94% of the total population of the village. Average Sex Ratio of Challur village is 1014 which is higher than Karnataka state average of 973. Child Sex Ratio for the Challur as per census is 974, higher than Karnataka average of 948.

== Geography ==
It belongs to Gulbarga Division, It is located 15°36′N 76°35′E 64 km (40 mi) towards East from District headquarters Koppal, 18 km (11 mi) from Gangavathi and 364 km (226 mi) from State capital Bangalore. The nearest town is Karatagi, and the village is on the banks of Tunga Bhadra Left Bank Canal, #36. Its taluk headquarters is Karatagi and District headquarters is Koppal.

== See also ==
- Kanakagiri
- Karatagi
- Gangavathi
