= Balaganur, Sindhanur =

== Demographics ==
As of the 2001 Indian census, Balganur had a population of 11942 with 5948 males and 5994 females.

== See also ==
- Maski
- Sindhanur
- Raichur
- Olaballari
- Districts of Karnataka
