= Ginigera Junction railway station =

Railway station in Karnataka, India

Ginigera Junction

General information
- Location: NH 67, Ginigera-583 228. ,Koppal district, Karnataka; India
- Coordinates: 15°20′43″N 76°14′23″E
- System: Indian Railways station
- Owner: Indian Railways
- Operator: South Western Railway
- Line: Guntakal–Vasco da Gama section Mahabubnagar–Munirabad railway line
- Platforms: 3
- Tracks: 4

Construction
- Structure type: Standard (on-ground station)
- Parking: No
- Cycle facilities: No

Other information
- Status: Functioning
- Station code: GIN
- Zone(s): South Western Railway
- Division(s): Hubli

History
- Electrified: Double Line Electrified
Location
- Location within Karnataka Location within India

Ginigera Junction railway station (station code: GIN) is NSG-6 Category Station falls under Hubli railway division of South Western Railway in Koppal district, Karnataka, India. Ginigera Junction railway station has three platforms which mainly serve Ginigera and nearby villages.

== Major trains ==
Trains that run through/from Ginigera are:

- Hampi Express
- Hubballi–Karatagi Unreserved Express
- Karatagi-Hubballi Unreserved Express
- Hubballi–Karatagi Special Express
- Karatagi-Hubballi Special Express
- Yesvantpur–Karatagi Express
- Karatagi-Yesvantpur Express
- Hubballi-Tirupati Special fare Express
- Tirupati-Hubballi Special fare Express
- Hubballi–Hosapete DEMU Passenger
- Hosapete-Hubballi DEMU Passenger
- Hubballi–Guntakal Passenger
- Guntakal–Hubballi Passenger
