= Nittur, Siruguppa =

Nittur Nitturu
- Village
- Location within Karnataka Location within India
- Coordinates: 15°32′48″N 76°49′58″E
- Country: India
- State: Karnataka
- District: Bellary district
- Taluk: Siraguppa

Languages
  - Official: Kannada
- Time zone: UTC+5:30 (IST)
- PIN: 583122
- Vehicle registration: KA 34

Nittur is a village in the Siruguppa taluk of Bellary district in Karnataka state, India.

== Importance ==
Nittur is famous for the minor edict of the emperor Ashoka found in the village.

== See also ==
- Bellary
- Maski
- Siruguppa
- Tekkalakote
