= Gangavathi railway station =

Railway station in Karnataka, India

Gangavathi Railway Station (ಗಂಗಾವತಿ ರೈಲು ನಿಲ್ದಾಣ) Gangavathi

General information
- Other names: Kishkindha Railway Station
- Location: Vidhyanagar, Gangavathi, Gangavathi taluk, Koppal district, Karnataka; India
- Coordinates: 15°26′31″N 76°32′37″E
- System: Indian Railways station
- Owner: Indian Railways
- Operator: South Western Railway
- Line: Mahabubnagar-Munirabad railway line
- Platforms: 3
- Tracks: 4

Construction
- Structure type: Elevated
- Parking: YES
- Cycle facilities: No

Other information
- Status: Functioning
- Station code: GGVT
- Zone(s): South Western Railway
- Division(s): Hubli

History
- Opened: 2019
- Electrified: Ongoing
Location
- Location within Karnataka Location within India

Gangavathi railway station (station code: GGVT) falls under Hubli railway division of the South Western Railway in Koppal district, Karnataka, India. Gangavathi railway station inaugurated on 4 March 2019. Gangavathi railway station has three platforms and four tracks which serve mainly Gangavati City and nearby heritage tourist places of historic importance.

== Preliminary Engineering – cum Traffic survey ==
Preliminary Engineering Cum Traffic Survey for New line between Gangavathi-Daroji (36 km) Detailed estimate has been vetted by Finance for conducting a survey for a cost of Rs. 15.64 lakhs. Re-tender opened on 19.10.2022. Under finalisation.

== Major trains ==
Trains that run through/from Gangavathi are:

- Hubballi – Sindhanur Express (17303)
- Sindhanur – Hubballi Express (17304)
- Hubballi – Sindhanur Passenger (07381)
- Sindhanur – Hubballi Passenger (07382)
- Yesvantpur – Sindhanur Express (16545)
- Sindhanur – Yesvantpur Express (16546)
- KSR Bengaluru - Sindhanuru Express (17391)
- Sindhanur - KSR Bengaluru Express (17392)
