= Alabanoor =

Alabanooru Alabanur
- Village
- Location within Karnataka Location within India
- Coordinates: 15°45′58.48″N 76°52′15.12″E
- Country: India
- State: Karnataka
- District: Raichur district
- Taluk: Sindhanur

Languages
  - Official: Kannada
- Time zone: UTC+5:30 (IST)
- Telephone code: 08535
- Vehicle registration: KA 36

Alabanooru also spelled as Alabanur is a village in the Sindhanur taluk of Raichur district in the Indian state of Karnataka. Alabanur is located on Sindhanur-Olaballari road.

== Transport ==
=== Rail ===
Mahabunagar-Munirabad railway line is close to the area.

== See also ==
- Maski
- Olaballari
- Raichur
- Sindhanur
