= Karatgi =

Village in India

- village
- Location in Karnataka, India Karatgi (India)
- Coordinates: 15°36′29″N 76°39′35″E
- Country: India
- State: Karnataka
- District: Koppal
- Talukas: Gangawati

Government
  - Body: Gram panchayat

Population (2001)
  - Total: 24,410

Languages
  - Official: Kannada
- Time zone: UTC+5:30 (IST)
- ISO 3166 code: IN-KA
- Vehicle registration: KA
- Website: karnataka.gov.in

Karatgi is a village in the southern state of Karnataka, India. It is located in the Gangawati taluk of Koppal district in Karnataka.

== Demographics ==
As of 2001 India census, Karatgi had a population of 24410 with 12503 males and 11907 females.

== See also ==
- Koppal
- Districts of Karnataka
