= Munirabad railway station =

Railway station in Karnataka

Munirabad

General information
- Location: State Highway 130, Munirabad, Koppal district, Karnatak; India
- Coordinates: 15°18′31″N 76°20′08″E
- Elevation: 470 metres (1,540 ft)
- System: Indian Railways station
- Owner: Indian Railways
- Operator: South Western Railway zone
- Line: Guntakal–Vasco da Gama line
- Platforms: 2
- Tracks: Double Electric-Line

Construction
- Structure type: Standard (on ground)

Other information
- Status: Functioning
- Station code: MRB
- Zone(s): South Western Railway zone
- Division(s): Hubballi

Services
Preceding station	Indian Railways	Following station
Hosapete Junction towards ?	South Western Railway zone Guntakal–Vasco da Gama section	Hitnal towards ?
Location
- Interactive map

Munirabad railway station is a railway station located on the Guntakal–Vasco da Gama line operated by the South Western Railway zone under Hubballi railway division. It is situated beside State Highway 130 at Munirabad in Koppal district in the Indian state of Karnatak.
