= Siddapur, Koppala =

Village in India

Siddapur
- Village
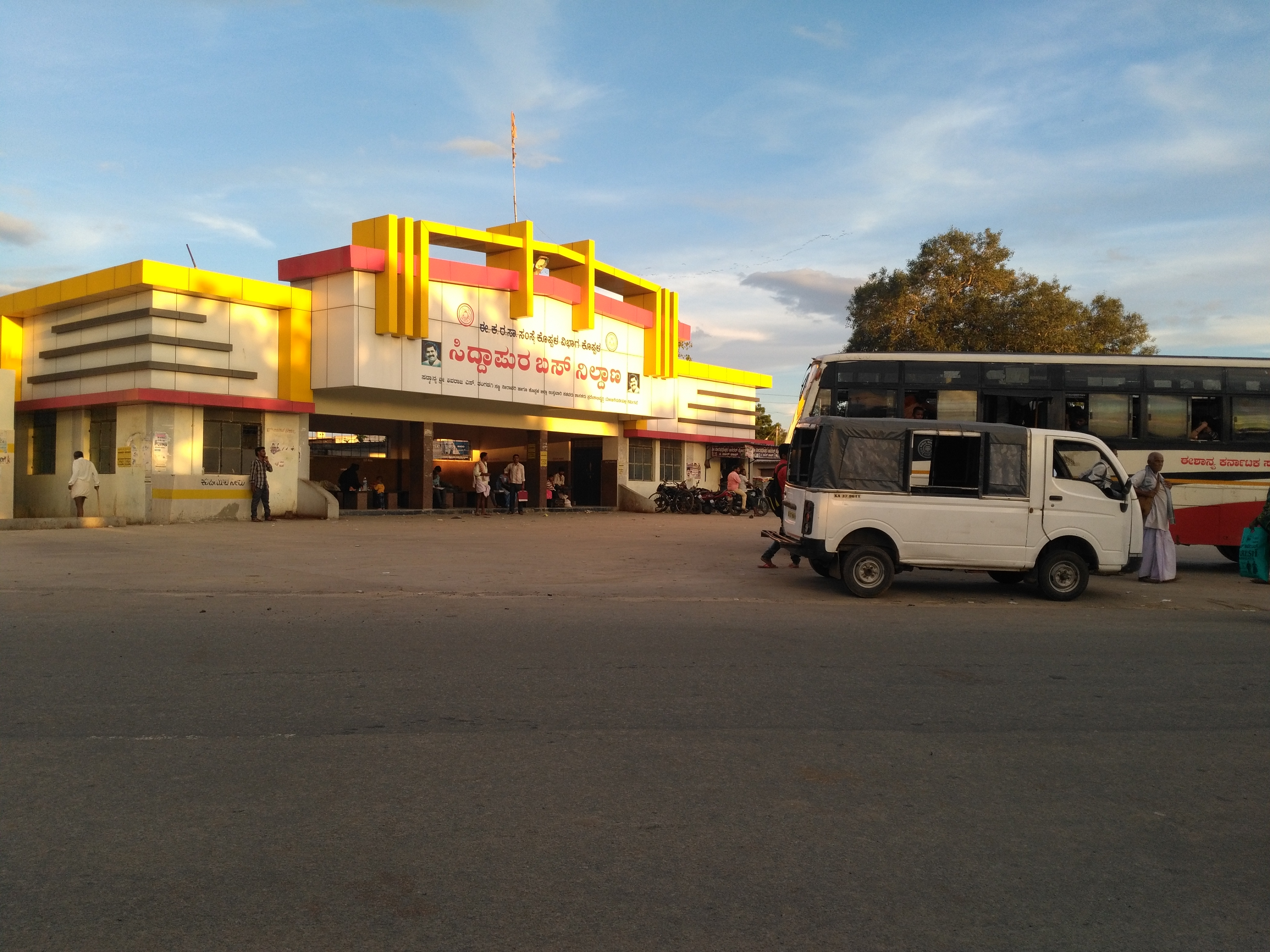

- Location in Karnataka, India Siddapur (India)
- Coordinates: 15.530°N 76.636°E
- Country: India
- State: Karnataka
- District: Koppal
- Named for: Veerappayya Thatha

Government
  - Body: Village Panchayat

Population
  - Total: Approx. 10,000

Languages
  - Official: Kannada
  - Speaking: Kannada, Hindi, Telugu
- Time zone: UTC+5:30 (IST)
- PIN: 583 282
- ISO 3166 code: IN-KA
- Vehicle registration: KA 37
- Nearest city: Karatagi
- Lok Sabha constituency: Koppal
- Vidhan Sabha constituency: Kanakagiri
- Website: karnataka.gov.in

Siddapur is a village in Koppal district, Karnataka, India to the northeast of Gangawati town. It is located at 15.530, 76.636. The Siddapur village has population of 9815 of which 4895 are males while 4920 are females as per Population Census 2011.

== Gallery ==
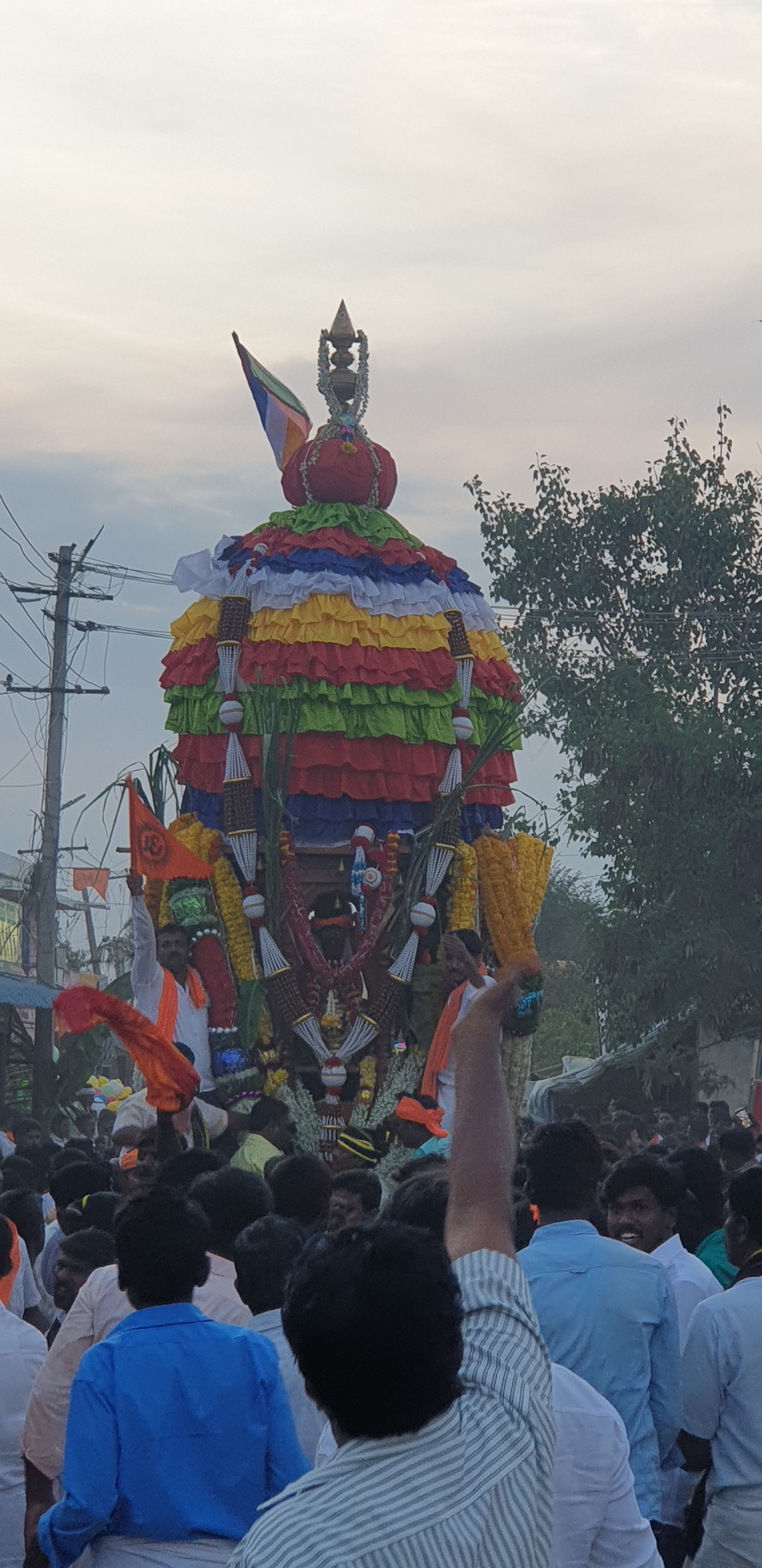
Sri. Sharana Basaveshwara Theru

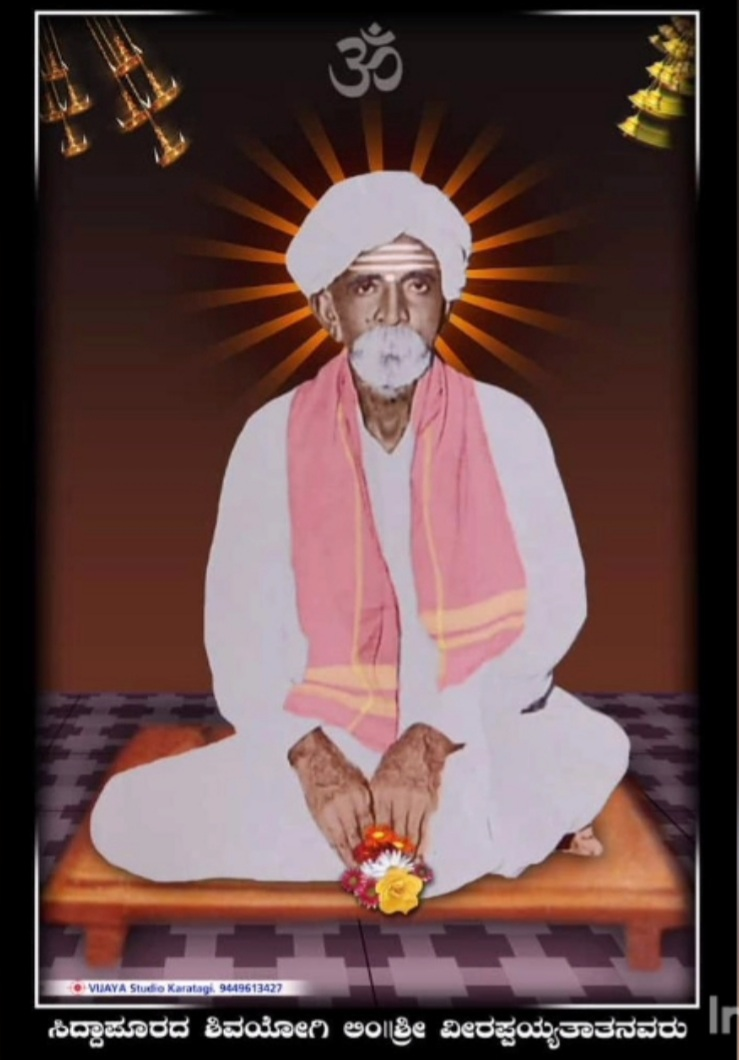
Portrait of Sri Veerappaiah Thathatha

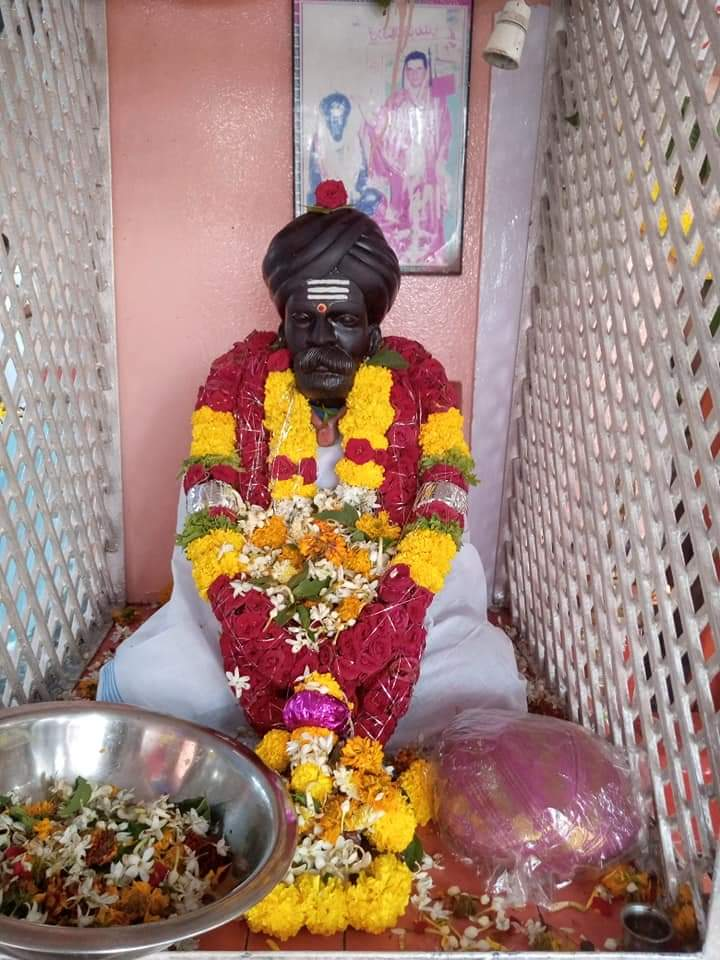
The statue of Sri Veerappayyathatha
