= Gundur =

Village in India

- village
- Interactive map of Gundur
- Country: India
- State: Karnataka
- District: Koppal district
- Talukas: Gangawati

Government
  - Type: Panchayat raj
  - Body: Gram panchayat

Languages
  - Official: Kannada
- Time zone: UTC+5:30 (IST)
- ISO 3166 code: IN-KA
- Vehicle registration: KA
- Lok Sabha constituency: Koppal
- Vidhan Sabha constituency: Gangawati
- Website: karnataka.gov.in

Gundur is a village in the southern state of Karnataka, India. It is located in the Gangawati taluk of Koppal district in Karnataka.

== Demographics ==
As of 2001 India census, Gundur had a population of 6273 with 3166 males and 3107 females.

== See also ==
- Bidar
- Districts of Karnataka
