= Ginigera =

- Village
- Location within Karnataka Location within India
- Coordinates: 15°20′53.76″N 76°14′50.30″E
- Country: India
- State: Karnataka
- District: Koppal district
- Taluk: Koppal

Government
  - Body: Gram panchayat

Population (2001)
  - Total: 4,968

Languages
  - Official: Kannada
- Time zone: UTC+5:30 (IST)
- PIN: 583 228
- Telephone code: 08539
- ISO 3166 code: IN-KA
- Vehicle registration: KA-37
- Website: karnataka.gov.in

Ginigera is a village in the Koppal taluk of Koppal district in the Indian state of Karnataka. It is 10 kilometres (6.2 mi) from Koppal and lies on National Highway 67. Ginigera is on the railway network and lies on the Guntakal–Hubli line.

== Demographics ==
At the 2001 census of India, Ginigera had a population of 4,968 (2,567 males and 2,402 females) and 954 households.

== See also ==
- Hospet
- Gangavati, Karnataka
- Koppal
- Karnataka
