= Jawalagera =

- village
- Location in Karnataka, India Jawalagera (India)
- Coordinates: 15°51′56″N 76°48′56″E
- Country: India
- State: Karnataka
- District: Raichur
- Talukas: Sindhanur

Population (2006)
  - Total: 15,980

Languages
  - Official: Kannada
- Time zone: UTC+5:30 (IST)
- PIN: 584143
- Vehicle registration: KA 36
- Nearest city: sindhanur
- Literacy: 75%
- Lok Sabha constituency: Raichur
- Vidhan Sabha constituency: Sindhanur

Jawalagera is a village in the southern state of Karnataka, India. It is located in the Sindhnur taluk of Raichur district in Karnataka. It's postal code is 584143. The total village spans across 980 hectares with the closest town being sindhanur .

== Demographics ==
As of 2011 Indian census, 1560 families reside in Jawalagera with a total of 8318 with 4073 males and 4245 females.

There are kingdom ruins from the Vijayanagar Empire.

== See also ==
- Raichur
- Districts of Karnataka
