= Amba Matha =

Amba Matha Amba Mutt
- Village
- Location within Karnataka Location within India
- Coordinates: 15°39′11.32″N 76°47′57.01″E
- Country: India
- State: Karnataka
- District: Raichur district
- Taluk: Sindhanur

Languages
  - Official: Kannada
- Time zone: UTC+5:30 (IST)
- Telephone code: 08535
- Vehicle registration: KA-36

Amba Matha also spelled as Amba Mutt (Kannada: ಅಂಬಾ ಮಠ) is a village in the Indian state of Karnataka. Amba Matha is a holy place, Sri Amba Devi Temple is located there.

== Administration ==
The village is near Somalapura in the Sindhanur taluk of Raichur district.

== Culture ==
The Ambadevi Temple was built in the 17th century. Lakhs of devotees visit from Karnataka and other states.

== History ==
The Amba Math occupies a hilly and dense forest area.

=== Chidananda Avadhuta ===
Chidananda Avadhuta had a vision of the goddess as a child. He was born in 1876 in Hireharivan in Adoni district into a poor family that followed the common calendar. He had abandoned the house built by Gowda outside the village because there was a ghost. Avadhuta lived in that house with his father and mother. When his father went to worship the family's favorite deity, Veeranarayana, Chidananda tied him to a pole so that he would not touch the cooking utensils of curry, ghee and other offerings. At this time, Ambadevi, who appeared in the form of her mother, freed Avadhuta from the bonds and made him eat. She went out saying that she would bring water. When the family members came, they were shocked to see him eating. The mother scolded Chidananda for eating before worshipping the god. But you gave me food, if you want, look at your finger in the ghee, he cried. Father says that this is the glory of the Goddess and stopped beating the boy.

From there, he came to Hebbal in Gangavathi taluk with his family to work as a laborer. He was sent to study with Honnappa, a scholar, on the banks of Tungabhadra river. After studying, he went to Ranganatha temple near Ravudakunda in Sindhanur taluk and meditated in a cave for 9 days. His mind found no peace there and he went to Somalapur hill, and did penance in a cave. After spending many days worshipping the Goddess, the Goddess appeared and listened to his request. He requested that Mahima, who is worshipped as a deity in this area, should become a man who gives blessings to those who pray to him. But at the request of Chidananda Yatis, who did not want anything, an Amba Devi idol emerged.

Gradually, the temple grew larger, becoming Amba Math, attracting many devotees.

== Festival ==
The annual Sharannavarathri festival is held during Dussehra, and the Devi Jatra is held on the full moon day of Banada in January. Special worship is performed on every new moon and full moon, and thousands of devotees have darshan at the Devi Sannidhana on Tuesdays and Fridays.

== See also ==
- Salagunda
- Roudkunda
- Maski
- Sindhanur
- Raichur
