= Munirabad =

Town in India

Munirabad Huligi
- Town
- Location in Karnataka, India Munirabad (India)
- Coordinates: 15.31°N 76.33°E
- Country: India
- State: Karnataka
- District: Koppal

Government
  - Body: Municipal Council Of Munirabad

Area
  - Total: 4.43 km^{2} (1.71 sq mi)
- Elevation: 476 m (1,562 ft)

Population (2011)
  - Total: 8,672
  - Density: 1,960/km^{2} (5,070/sq mi)
- Demonym: Munirabadi

Languages
  - Official: Kannada
- Time zone: UTC+5:30 (IST)
- Postal code: 583233
- Telephone code: 08539
- Vehicle registration: KA37

Munirabad, also called Huligi, is a town in the Koppal district in the Indian state of Karnataka.

== Demographics ==
According to the 2001 Indian census, Munirabad had a population of 8,113. 12% of inhabitants were under 6. Males constituted 51% of the population. Munirabad had an average literacy rate of 75%, considerably higher than the national average of 59.5%. Male literacy surpassed that of females, at 82% compared to 68%.

== Economy ==
Munirabad's economy is primarily industrial.

== Geography ==
Munirabad is situated at Tungabhadra Dam, known for its Independence Day celebrations and Parks.

Munirabad Dam also has "Lake view" and "Pampavana Garden".

Munirabad is situated near to Hosapete.

The two banks to Tungabhadra Dam are TB Dam and Munirabad Dam.

Munirabad comes besides National Highway 67 (NH 67, previously National Highway 63), on way to Hospet - Koppal.

== Facilities ==
Munirabad Dam is a project area that includes a Japan style Garden - Pampavana, High-level Canal, Low-level Canal, school's, GOVT General hospital, and Indra-bhavan. The Munirabad project area also contains offices of different departments such as Irrigation Department, KPTCl, kPCL, and PWD and Horticulture departments, Guest Houses, Dhabas around Area, and Vishweshraya Function hall.

Munirabad has a power generating station from KPCL and is called Powerhouse.

Places of worship include Ganesha Temple, Banni Mahankali Temple, Mosques, Church, and the Hanuman Temple.

== Transport ==
Munirabad can be reached by bus from Hosapete (8 km) or Koppal (20 km). Munirabad railway station is a railway station located on the Guntakal–Vasco da Gama line.

== History ==
When Rama and Laxman were seeking to find Sita Mata, they met Shabri, who was a devotee of Lord Rama, at Pampa Sarover, very near Munirabad. Bali Kila (Bali's Fort) is also situated near this place. Rishyamookh Hill is where Lord Rama and Hanuman met for the first time.

== Places of interest ==
- Munirabad Lake View.
- Pampavana Garden.
- TB Dam.
- Sports clubs.
- Huligemma Devi Temple.
- Pampa Sarovar.
- Bali Kila.
- Rishyamookh Hill.

"Huligamma Devi" is the deity for Huligi and the village name Huligi is derived from the same goddess name.

Munirabad is a popular pilgrimage site. References to Munirabad are found in the Ramayana.

== See also ==
- Hospet
- Koppal
- Karnataka
