= Salagunda =

- Village
- Location within Karnataka Location within India
- Coordinates: 15.667691°N 76.828648°E
- Country: India
- State: Karnataka
- District: Raichur district
- Taluk: Sindhanur

Languages. = Kannada uradu
  - Official: Kannada
- Time zone: UTC+5:30 (IST)
- PIN: 584167
- Telephone code: 08535
- Vehicle registration: KA-36

Salagunda, is a village in the Sindhanur taluk of Raichur district in Karnataka state, India. Salagunda was the capital of the Sindha dynasty. Salagunda is 20 km South to the taluka headquarters Sindhanur and 5 km from Karnataka State Highway 19. Nearest towns are Siruguppa and Karatagi.

== Demographics ==
As of 2001 India census, Salgunda had a population of 6560 with 3233 males and 3327 females.

== See also ==
- Somalapur
- Mukkunda
- Roudkunda
- Maski
- Kanakagiri
- Sindhanur
- Raichur
- Districts of Karnataka
