= Mahabubnagar–Munirabad railway line =

Indian railway line

Mahabubnagar-Munirabad section

Overview
- Status: Active
- Owner: Indian Railways
- Locale: Telangana; Karnataka
- Termini: Mahabubnagar; Munirabad
- Website: scr.indianrailways.gov.in

Service
- Services: Guntakal-Vasco da Gama section
- Operator(s): South Central Railway zone South Western Railway Zone

History
- Work began: 1997
- Opened: 2025; 1 year ago (est.)

Technical
- Line length: 274 km (170 mi)
- Track gauge: 5 ft 6 in (1,676 mm) broad gauge
- Electrification: Yes
- Operating speed: 130 km/h

The Mahabubnagar-Munirabad section is an under construction railway section project of the Indian Railways. The section falls under the administration of Guntakal of South Central Railway zone and Hubballi Railway Division of South Western Railway Zone. This serves as the shortest route to Hyderabad-Hubballi and Hyderabad-Goa routes.

== About the line ==
Sindhanur, Karnataka

The project was initially sanctioned in the year 1997 when H. D. Deve Gowda was the Prime Minister of India. The 274 km long Mahabubnagar to Munirabad new line project was sanctioned with a latest estimated cost of Rs 3,543 crores. This new line project has five sections: Mahabubnagar - Devarkadra, Devarkadra – Krishna Jn, Krishna Jn - Raichur Jn, Raichur Jn - Ginigera Jn and Ginigera Jn - Munirabad.

The new line project will help in expanding the rail network between Hyderabad and the mining belt of Karnataka. Several materials such as iron ore, cement, steel, and many others can now be transported through this alternate route.

The South Central Railway zone of the line was completed first. The Devarkadre - Jaklair part was completed in 2017, Maganoor - Krishna Jn portion of the line was completed on 9 February 2023. Prime Minister Narendra Modi, during the course of his visit to Telangana, dedicated the Krishna - Maganoor - Jaklair section to the nation on 1 October 2023.

In late 2023, it was announced the section between Devarkadra and Krishna will be fully electrified.

In the portion of the line that is with South Western Railway zone, the Ginigera - Chikkabenakal section(26 KM) was opened on 31st March 2017, Chikkabenakal-Gangavathi section (13 KM) was opened on 04th March 2019. The Gangavathi- Karatagi section(26 KM) was inaugurated on 10th November 2021.The Karatagi-Sindhanur section(20 KM) was inaugurated on 15th March 2024. With this Ginigera-Sindhanur (85 KM) out of 165 KM is completed and remaining balance rail line construction is going on.

The works on the only missing link of the line that is between Sindhanur and Raichur is in progress and is scheduled to complete by 2027.

== Construction Timeline and Status ==
1997 — The broader Mahabubnagar–Munirabad project was initially sanctioned.

2007–08 — The Ginigera–Raichur portion/project was sanctioned as part of the larger project.

30 November 2013 — A detailed estimate for the Ginigera–Raichur line was sanctioned by the Railway Board for ₹1,350.91 crore.

South Central Railway (SCR)Telangana StateDevarkadra to Krishna Section (66 Route Km)
Year / Date	Section	Status
2017	Devarkadra–Jaklair	Opened
9 February 2023	Maganoor–Krishna Junction	Opened
1 October 2023	Krishna–Maganoor–Jaklair	Dedicated to the nation

South Western Railway (SWR)Karnataka StateGinigera to Raichur Section (165 Route Km)
Date	Section	Status
31 March 2017	Ginigera–Chikkabenakal (26 km)	Opened
4 March 2019	Chikkabenakal–Gangavathi (13 km)	Opened
10 November 2021	Gangavathi–Karatagi (26 km)	Opened
15 March 2024	Karatagi–Sindhanur (20 km)	Opened
2024–2027	Sindhanur–Raichur (80 Km)	Under construction
