= Pothnal =

Pothnal Shankarapur
- Village
- Location within Karnataka Location within India
- Coordinates: 15°55′23.98″N 76°53′20.54″E
- Country: India
- State: Karnataka
- District: Raichur district
- Taluk: Manvi

Population (2011)
  - Total: 6,575

Languages
  - Official: Kannada, English
- Time zone: UTC+5:30 (IST)
- PIN: 584 143
- Telephone code: 08538
- Vehicle registration: KA-36

Pothnal is a village in the Manvi taluk of Raichur district in the Indian state of Karnataka. It is well connected by road and lies on Karnataka State Highway 23. Pothnal is 22 kilometres (14 mi) from Manvi and 24 kilometres (15 mi) from Sindhanur. It lies on the bank of a nala called Pothnal Nala.

A jatra is held at the Huchchabuddeshwara Temple every August. The nearest major railway station is in Raichur.

Pothnal has two NGOs: Vimukthi Charitable Trust and Navanirmana Trust.

== Demographics ==
As of 2011 India census, Pothnal had a population of 6,575 with 3,289 males and 3,286 females and 1,312 Households.

== See also ==
- Sindhanur
- Lingasugur
- Raichur
