= Olaballari =

Olaballari Valaballari
- Village
- Location within Karnataka Location within India
- Coordinates: 15.766281°N 76.940796°E
- Country: India
- State: Karnataka
- District: Raichur district
- Taluk: Sindhanur

Population (2001)
  - Total: 1,298

Languages
  - Official: Kannada
- Time zone: UTC+5:30 (IST)
- PIN: 584128
- Telephone code: 08535
- Vehicle registration: KA-36

Olaballari also known as Valaballari is a village in the Sindhanur taluk of Raichur district in Karnataka state, India. This village is located on the banks of Tungabhadra river. Olaballari is one of the holy place. Olaballari is 30 km from sindhanur.

== Demographics ==
As of 2001 India census, Olaballari had a population of 1,298 with 914 males and 903 females and 235 Households.

== See also ==
- Salagunda
- Roudkunda
- Amba Matha
- Maski
- Sindhanur
- Raichur
