= Siruguppa =

- City
- Nickname: ಭತ್ತದ ನಾಡು
- Location in Karnataka, India
- Coordinates: 15.6°N 77°E
- Country: India
- State: Karnataka
- District: Ballari
- Established: April 1910

Government
  - Type: City Municipal Council
  - Body: Siruguppa City Municipal Council

Area
  - Total: 31.14 km^{2} (12.02 sq mi)
- Elevation: 373 m (1,224 ft)

Population (2025)
  - Total: 76,000
  - Density: 2,400/km^{2} (6,300/sq mi)
- Demonym: Siruguppadavru

Languages
  - Official: Kannada
- Time zone: UTC+5:30 (IST)
- PIN Code: 583 121
- Telephone code: (+91) 8396
- Vehicle registration: KA 34

Siruguppa is a town and headquarters of the Siruguppa taluk and second largest city in Ballari district of Indian state of Karnataka. Siruguppa used to be popularly referred to as the “Manchester of Karnataka” due to its numerous cotton mills.

== Etymology ==
The name Siruguppa is derived from two Kannada words siri (wealth) and kuppe (hoard/ pile/ heap). This region was known for its prosperity during the famed Vijayanagara Empire.

== History ==
The history of the region dates back to the Mauryas. Inscriptions of king Ashoka are found in the Nittur village of the taluk. Tekkalakote which is at 12 km distance from taluk head quarters has shown evidence of prehistoric Neolithic rock paintings.The region was subsequently ruled by many famous dynasties like Chalukyas, Vijayanagara Empire.

=== As a taluk headquarter ===
During the British rule, the region around Siruguppa was made a taluk on 1 October 1910 after merging 46 villages from Bellary taluk, 29 from Adoni taluk and 23 from Alur taluk. However Siruguppa taluk was abolished on 1 April 1923. Once again, on 15 April 1929, 33 villages from Adoni taluk, 7 villages from Alur taluk along with the villages included in the Siruguppa Deputy Tahsildar’s division of Bellary taluk were constituted into a new taluk with Siruguppa as its Headquarters.

== Geography and climate ==
Siruguppa is located at 15.63°N 76.9°E. Located on the Deccan Plateau, it has an average elevation of 373 metres (1223 feet). It belongs to the dry inland region of Karnataka with an annual rainfall of 645 mm. The Taluk is bounded in the south by Bellary and Kurugodu taluk, in the west by Hospet and Karatagi taluk, in the north by Sindhanur taluk of Raichur district and in the east by Adoni taluk of Kurnool district of Andhra Pradesh.

== Town architecture ==
Historically, Siruguppa town was not a great commercial centre, despite being made a taluk headquarter during the British era. Even after independence, the town did not undergo much expansion. But, it is a major exporter of rice from Karnataka. The map of Siruguppa is bitter-gourd shaped, with much of the town spread heavily on either side of NH-150A (Jevargi-Chamarajanagar). Most of the new extension areas are also developed alongside Bellary road making the town look longer and narrower.

== Demographics ==
As of 2021 India census, Siruguppa Urban had a population of 72,503. Males constitute 51% of the population and females 49%. Siruguppa has an average literacy rate of 51%, lower than the national average of 59.5%: male literacy is 60%, and female literacy is 43%. In Siruguppa, 15% of the population is under 6 years of age.

== River ==
River Tungabhadra embraces the town from north-west. It is the main link between North and South Karnataka. Important sight seeing places along the river bank are Vasudhendra teertha vrindavana in Kenchanagudda, Shambhulingeshwara temple along Desnur road & Haragol ghat. The agriculture of the entire taluk is benefited by the river through irrigation. Vedavathi River or Hagari river which originates in western ghats Bababudangiri hills, flows through Chikkamagaluru, Chitradurga, Anantapur, & Ballari districts joins Tungabhadra river at Kududarhal or Siddaragonde village of Siruguppa taluk. Vedavathi river is also called as Hagari river in Ballari district as it flows through Hagari village of Ballari taluk.

== Transportation ==
Siruguppa lies along NH-150A, which is the longest national highway in the state, connecting Jewargi to Chamrajanagar. The town is facilitated by the buses run by the Kalyana Karnataka Road Transport Corporation KKRTC, a subdivision of the Karnataka State Road Transport Corporation KSRTC for the Kalyana-Karnataka region. Siruguppa town is well connected by buses from Ballari, Adoni, Mantralaya, Tumkur, Hyderabad, Bengaluru, Mysuru, Shivamogga, Hiriyuru, Dharmastala, Anantapur, Raichur, vijayapura, Bidar, Yadagiri and kalaburgi. It has its own bus depot and private bus facilities are also available from Siruguppa to Bengaluru, Mysuru, Mangaluru and Hyderabad.

Siruguppa does not have a railway station. The nearest station to the town is Sindhanur, and Adoni in Andhra Pradesh. The nearby stations are listed below.

- Sindhanur - 25 km
- Adoni - 40 km
- Ballari - 55 km
- Raichur - 90 km

Though the river Tungabhadra flows near the town, it is not used for transportation because of the shallowness of the river and inconsistent water levels. But a reconnaissance engineering-cum-traffic survey for a new railway line between Ballari and Lingasugur via Siruguppa, Sindhanur (145 km) and Ballari-Gabbur line Via Siruguppa, Devadurga survey has been completed and the report is under preparation.

== Education ==
Siruguppa belongs to the Kalyana-Karnataka region, a relatively backward zone of the Karnataka state. The town was educationally lagging behind in the past. Till recently, it did not even have a degree college for science. But the town has made rapid progress in education in the last decade. It boasts of a degree college for science, more than 3 for arts and commerce and around half a dozen pre-university colleges. The town also has up to 20 schools with one of them offering ICSE curriculum. The educational institutions of Siruguppa have produced a few IAS bureaucrats and many doctors, engineers, artists and other professionals.

== Industries ==
Siruguppa has the largest number of rice industries in Karnataka - more than 150. The trio of Siruguppa, Sindhanoor and Gangavati form one of the largest producers of rice in Karnataka. That is why Siruguppa is often called Land of paddy. There are vast fields of paddy and sugarcane. A sugar factory is located in Deshnur village which is 5 km away from town and a steel factory is located in Honnarahalli. Recently, this factory has stopped. There are also 60 oil factories around Siruguppa.

== Notable people ==
- Beerahalli Rami Reddy - Kannada Poet & Playwright
- BE Ramaiah - Educationist & Ex-Minister, Karnataka Govt
- M Shankar Reddy - Social Service & 3 Times MLA
- MS Somalingappa - Social Service & 3 Times MLA
- M Goutham Kumar - Social Service & Mayor BBMP
