= Sindhanur =

City in Karnataka, India

- City
- Sindhanur
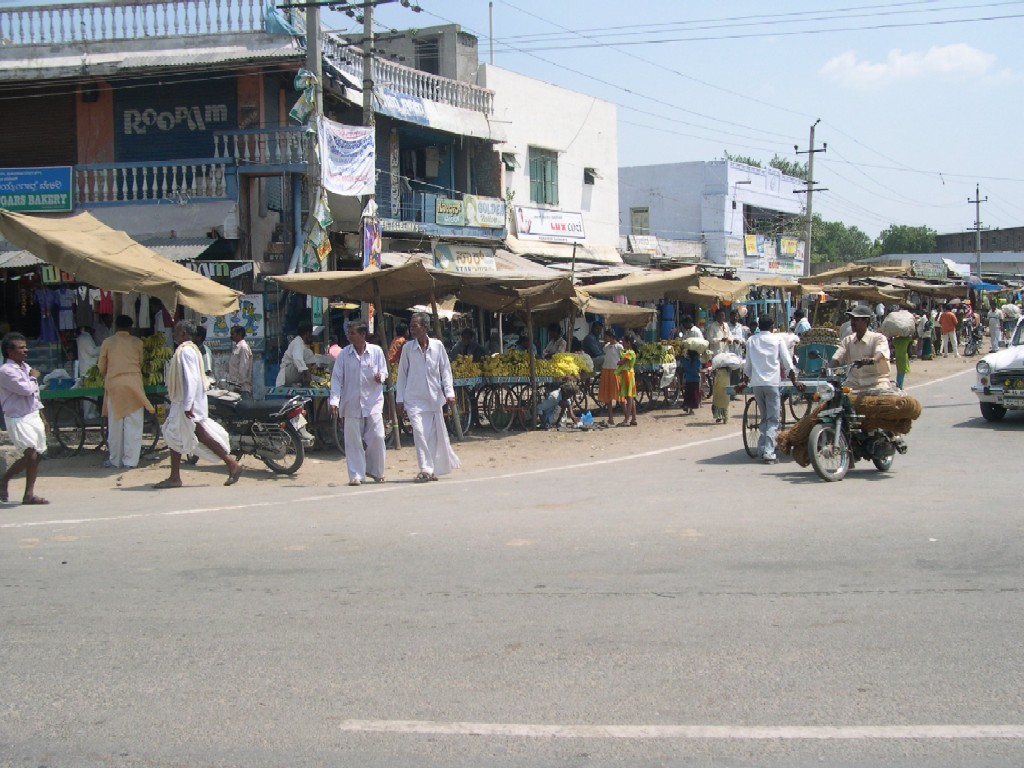
- Road side Shops of Sindhanur - 21 October 2006

- Location in Karnataka, India
- Coordinates: 15°46′12″N 76°45′20″E
- Country: India
- State: Karnataka
- District: Raichur
- Headquarters: Sindhanur City

Government
  - Body: CMC

Area
  - Total: 25.5 km^{2} (9.8 sq mi)
- Elevation: 377 m (1,237 ft)

Population
  - Total: 116,837
  - Density: 225.74/km^{2} (584.7/sq mi)

Languages
  - Official: Kannada
- Time zone: UTC+5:30 (IST)
- PIN: 584128
- Telephone code: 08535
- ISO 3166 code: IN-KA
- Vehicle registration: KA 36
- Website: www.sindhanurcity.mrc.gov.in

Sindhanur is a city and taluk headquarter of Sindhanur taluk of Raichur District in Karnataka. The river Tungabhadra covers the irrigation area by left bank canal. Most of the land in the field is composed of cultivable black soil. Paddy is cultivated using the Tungabhadra River water. Sindhanur is also known as the Paddy Granary of Raichur. With the availability of Tungabhadra river water, paddy rice is grown twice a year. Sindhanur is the place where the majority of tractor sales take place in Asia, as agricultural activities take place year-round. Sona Masuri and Basmati rice are grown in Sindhanur.

== Geography ==
Sindhanur is a City and City Municipal Council located in Raichur District in the state of Karnataka. Residents prefer the many amenities found in Sindhanur over other district zones in Karnataka. Sindhanur city has 37,040 households and is divided into 31 wards. It has food services like Swiggy. Sindhanur city elections are held every 5 years to elect a representative of each ward. It has an average elevation of 377 metres (1,237 ft), and its area is 1,567.70 km^{2} (605.29 sq mi).

== Economy ==
The economy of Sindhanur is predominantly driven by intensive agriculture, making it a primary commercial hub in the Raichur district. Irrigated heavily by the left bank canal of the Tungabhadra River, the region's fertile black soil supports the robust cultivation of Sona Masuri and Basmati paddy varieties. This massive agricultural output has earned the region the nickname "Paddy Granary of Raichur" and fueled a widespread local rice milling industry. Due to high farming revenues and continuous cultivation cycles, Sindhanur has also developed into a major market for agricultural machinery, hosting a vast concentration of commercial tractor and harvester dealerships.

== Transport ==
Sindhanur is well connected by road. It is located on the National Highway 150A.

=== Rail ===
Sindhanur has a railway station (Sindhanur railway station) and is located on the Mahabubnagar-Munirabad railway line.

== Demographics ==
As of a 2017 Indian Census, Sindhanur had a population of 116,837 (59,029 male, 57,808 female), representing a 54.06% increase since 2011. The sex-ratio of Sindhanur city is around 994, higher than the state average of 973. Sindhanur City has an average literacy rate of 83.98%, higher than the national average of 59.5%; male literacy is 87.72%, and female literacy is 80.01%. In Sindhanur, 19.44% of the population is under 6 years of age.

Majority of population speak Kannada and minor population speak different languages like Telugu, Bengali, Rajasthani, Urdu, etc. The Ambamma jathre Fair at Sindhanur is famous which is held in January of every year at Amba matha An evening fair is a special event here.

Interesting thing to notice about Sindhanur Taluk is its diversity. 20% of the population is Bengali speaking(Bengali camp sindhanur). Rajasthani, Telugu, Urdu are other minor languages.

== Religion ==
Religions in Sindhanur (2011)
Religion	Percent
Hinduism	84.54%
Islam	14.71%
Jainism	1.64%
Christianity	0.46%
Other or not stated	0.65%
