= Economy of Karnataka =

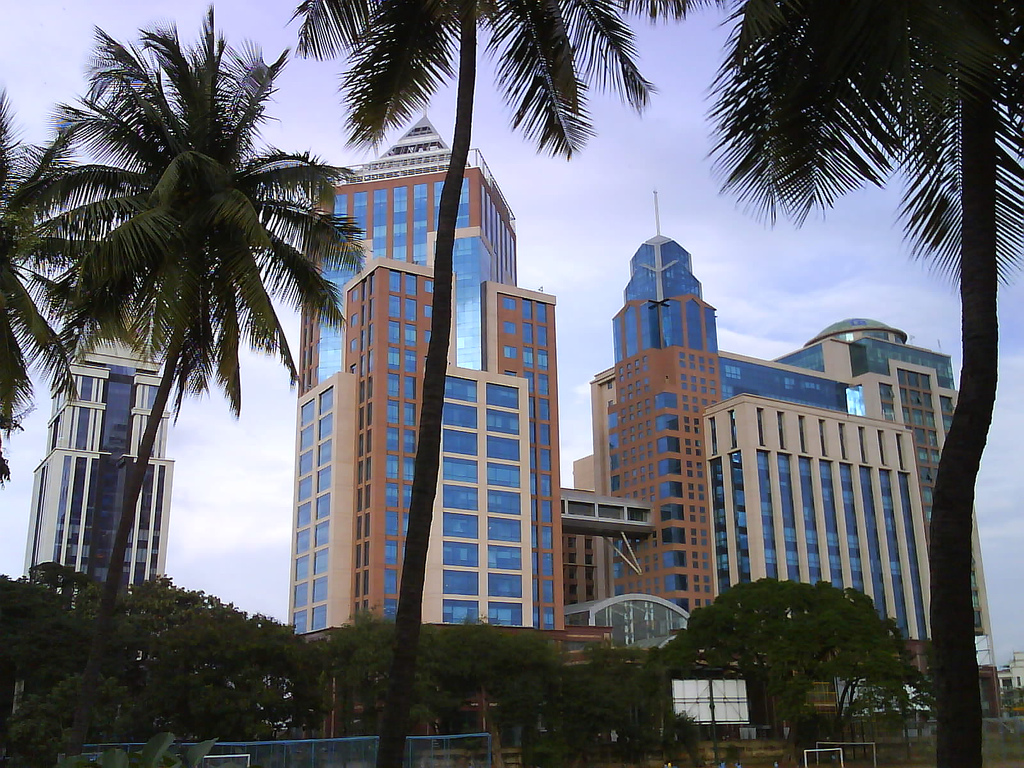
- Bengaluru, The capital city of Karnataka
- Currency: Indian rupee (INR, ₹)
- Fiscal year: 1 April – 31 March

Statistics
- Population: ▲68,362,000
- GDP: ▲₹33.055 trillion (US$340 billion) (nominal; 2026 est.)▲$1.60 trillion(PPP; 2026 est.)
- GDP rank: 5th
- GDP growth: 8% (2025-2026)
- GDP per capita: ▲₹477,003 (US$5,000) (nominal; 2025-26) ▲$23,161(PPP; 2026 est.)
- GDP per capita rank: 4th (2023-24 est.)
- GDP by sector: Agriculture 15% Industry 19% Services 66% (2021–22)
- Population below national poverty line: ▼5.67% in poverty (2024-25)
- Human Development Index: ▲0.758 high (2025) (21st)
- Unemployment: ▼10.65% (March 2024)

External
- Main export partners: United States

Public finance
- Government debt: 27.49% of GSDP (2022–23 est.)
- Budget balance: ₹−61,564 crore (US$−6.4 billion) 3.26% of GSDP (2022–23 est.)
- Revenue: ₹3.53 lakh crore (US$37 billion) (2025–26 est.)
- Spending: ₹4.04 lakh crore (US$42 billion) (2025–26 est.)
- All values, unless otherwise stated, are in US dollars.

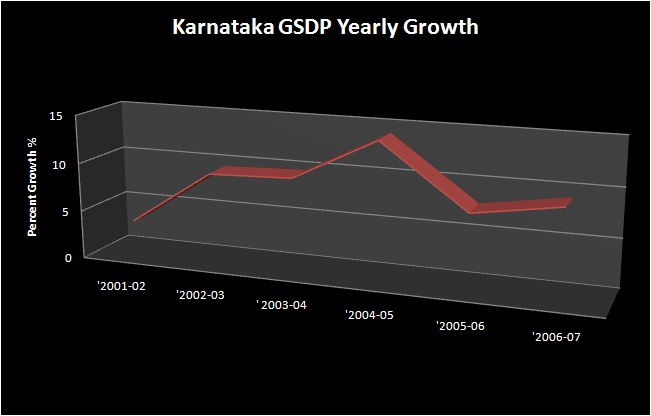

The economy of the State of Karnataka is the 3rd largest in India, with a GSDP (Gross State Domestic Product) of $361 billion or $1.6 trillion PPP. It has a developed and diversified economy, and is home to one of the world’s largest and most important technology clusters.

With an overall GDP growth of 56.2% and a per capita GDP growth of 43.9% in the last decade, Karnataka surpassed many other states in India, pushing Karnataka's per capita income in Indian Rupee terms to sixth place. Karnataka received US$2,026.4 million worth of Foreign Direct Investment for the fiscal year 2008–09, placing it at the third spot among states in India. At the end of 2004, the unemployment rate of Karnataka was 4.57% compared to a national rate of 5.99%. For the fiscal year 2006–07 the inflation rate of Karnataka was 4.4%, which was less than the national average.

Between 2011-12 and 2017-18, the GSDP of the state grew at a Compound Annual Growth Rate (CAGR) of 13.11 per cent to reach ₹ 12.69 trillion (US$196.88 billion) and the net state domestic product (NSDP) grew at a CAGR of 12.83 per cent to reach ₹ 11.45 trillion (US$177.68 billion).

A fiscal year in Karnataka begins on 1 April of the previous calendar year and ends on 31 March of the year with which it is numbered.

Following Bengaluru Urban, the Dakshina Kannada (Mangaluru), Hubli-Dharwad, and Belagavi districts contribute the highest revenue to the state, respectively.

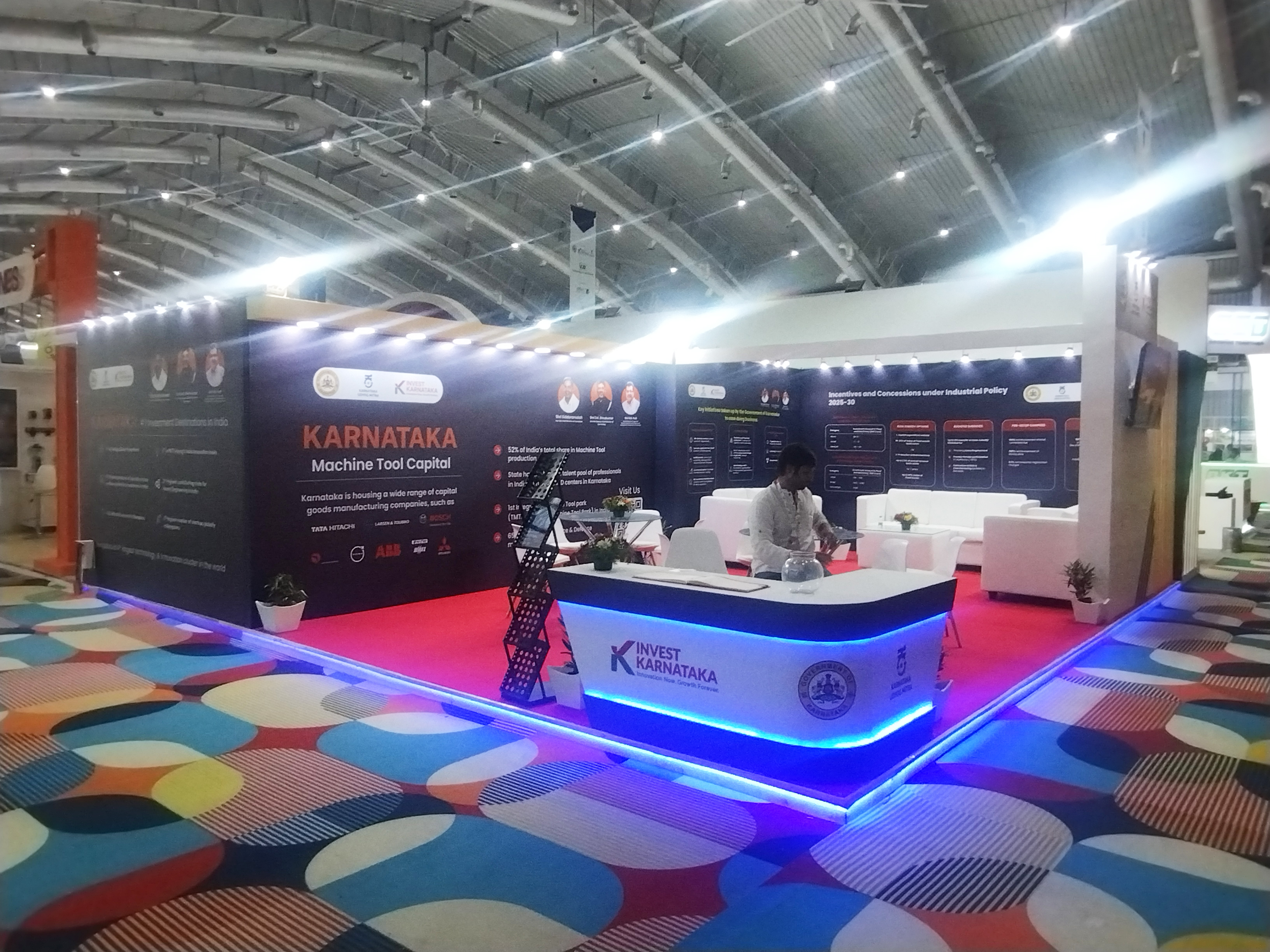
Invest Karnataka (Global Investors Meet 2025) at EXCON 2025, BIEC

== Agriculture and Livestock ==
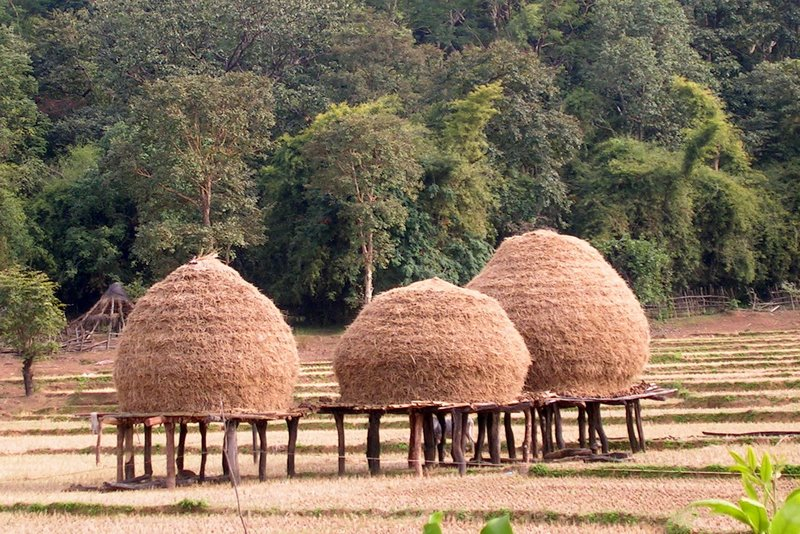
Haystack on stilts in paddy fields of Uttara Kannada district

Agriculture is the primary occupation of most of Karnataka's rural people. A total of 123,100 km^{2} of land is cultivated in Karnataka, constituting 64.60% of the total geographical area of the state. According to the 2001 census, farmers and agricultural labourers formed 56% of the workforce of Karnataka. Agriculture in Karnataka is heavily dependent on the southwest monsoon since the extent of arid land in the state is second only to Rajasthan. Only 26.5% of sown area (30,900 km^{2}) is subjected to irrigation. The state has three agricultural seasons – Kharif (April to September), Rabi (October to December) and Summer (January to March).

Given below is a table of 2015 national output share of select agricultural crops and allied segments in Karnataka based on 2011 prices.

Segment	National Share %
Mulberry	98.7
Coffee	92.7
Safflower	62.1
Ragi	59.2
Arecanut	58.6
Sunflower	55.2
Tamarind	32.4
Sericulture and Apiculture	28.9
Jowar	26.9
Horsegram	25.6
Sapota	24.6
Capsicum	19.9
Pomegranate	19.8
Water melon	19.7
Coconut	17.3
Grape	17.3
Floriculture	16.8
Narcotics	15.9
Wool and hair	14.8
Maize	14.5
Pepper	14.2
Cucumber	13.9
Condiments and spices	13.5
Sugarcane	10.7
Cashew nut	9.6
Arhar	9.4
Tobacco leaf	9.2
Tobacco stem	9.2
Fuel wood	8.4
Carrot	7.9
Tomato	7.2
Pineapple	7.1
Egg	6.7
Bean	6.6
Lemon	6.6
Pulse	6.5
Jackfruit	6.4
Turmeric	5.8
Cocoa	5.6
Groundnut	5.6
Marine fish	5.5
Ginger	5.4
Mango	5.4
Grass	5.2
Papaya	5.2
Rubber	5.1
Kitchen garden	5.0

=== Primary Crops grown in Karnataka ===
The main crops grown are rice, ragi, jowar (sorghum), maize, and pulses (tur and gram) in addition to oilseeds and a number of other cash crops. Cashews, coconut, arecanut, cardamom, chili peppers, cotton, sugarcane and tobacco are also produced. Karnataka is the largest producer of coarse cereals, coffee, raw silk and tomatoes among the states in India. Horticultural crops are grown in an area of 16,300 km^{2} and the annual production is about 9.58 million tons. The income generated from horticulture constitutes over 40% of income generated from agriculture and it is about 17% of the state's GDP. In floriculture, Karnataka occupies the second position in India in terms of production; 700 tons of flowers (worth ₹ 500 million) were produced in 2004–05.

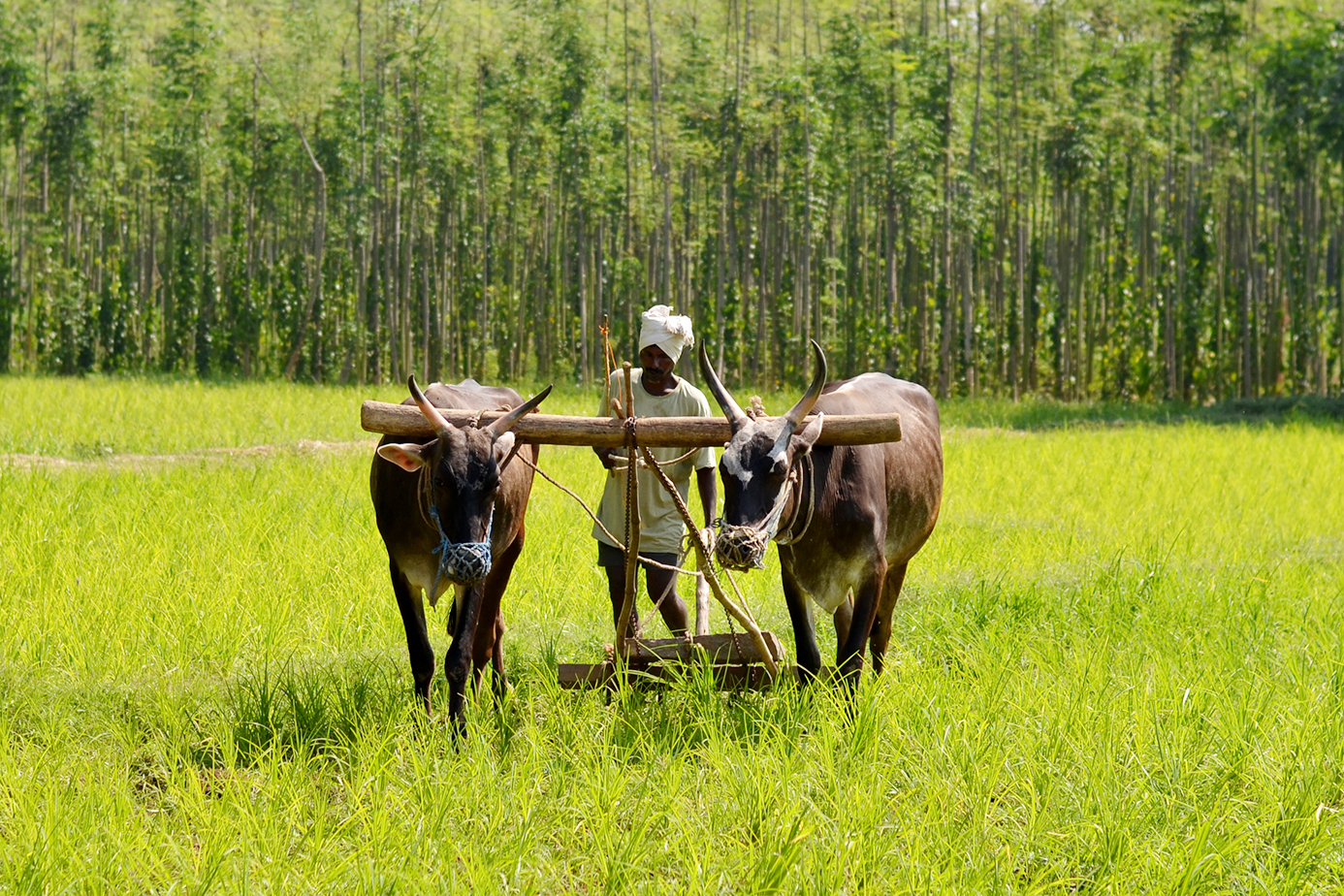
Traditional farming methods are still in use

A majority of the thirty-five billion rupee silk industry in India is headquartered in Karnataka State, primarily in Mysore and North Bengaluru regions of Doddaballapura, the site of a planned 700 million "Silk City".

== Education ==
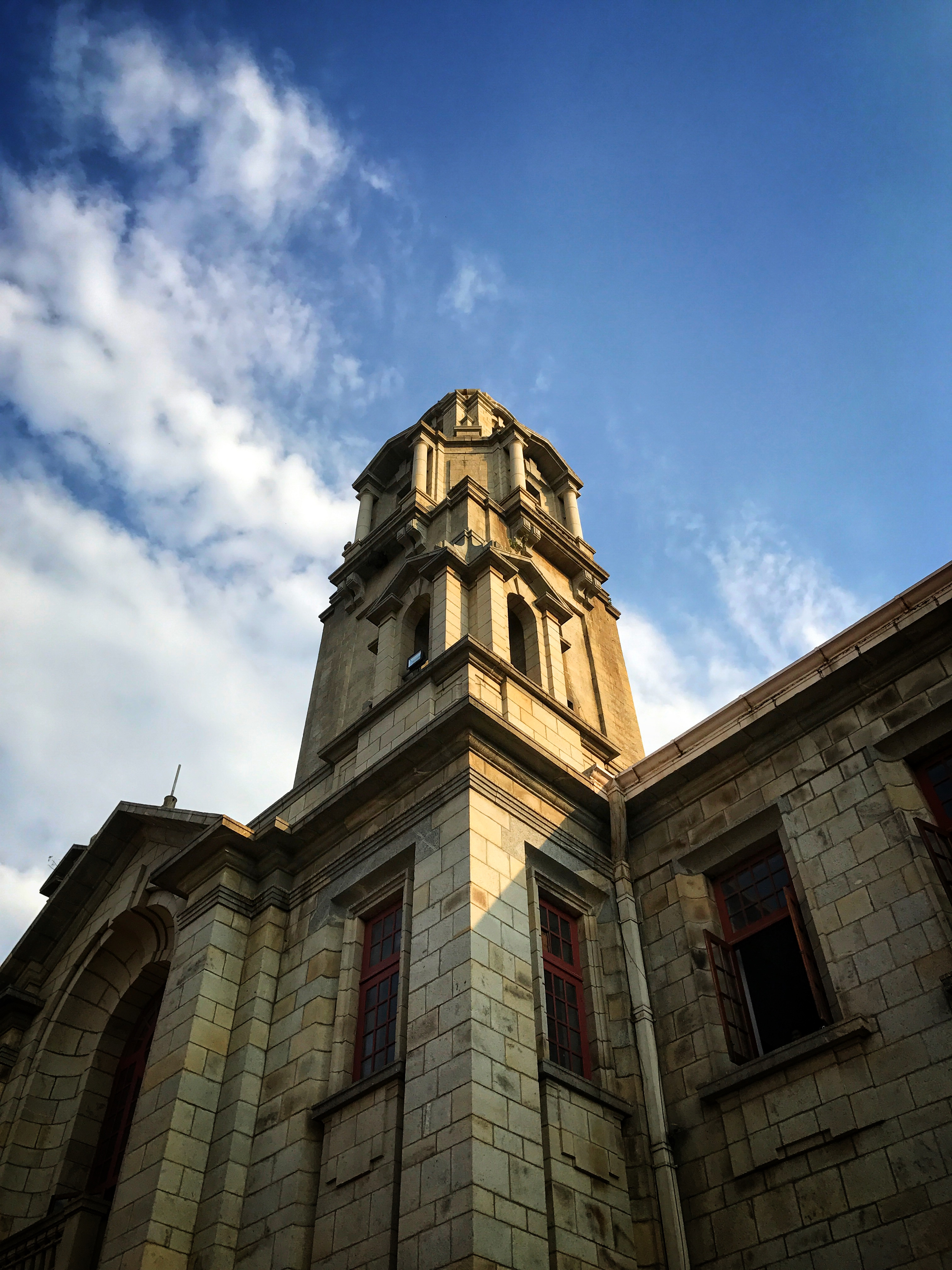
Main building of IISc, Bengaluru

Karnataka has one of the largest concentrations of higher education in India, including medical and engineering colleges. Apart from Bengaluru, places like Mangalore, Hubli-Dharwad, Mysore, Belagavi, Udupi, Tumakuru and Davanagere have been producing professionals for the Information Technology industry. Muddenahalli, in North Bengaluru, is the site of the upcoming Sri Sathya Sai Baba University and College of Medicine and a branch of the Visvesvaraya Institute of Advanced Technology. Devanahalli is set to be the location of a ₹95 billion Devanahalli Business Park, which will contain Aerospace Education Special Economic Zones, near the Bengaluru International Airport. Bengaluru is home to several educational and research institutions, including Indian Institute of Science, National Law School of India University, University Visvesvaraya College of Engineering, Ramaiah Institute of Technology, R.V. College of Engineering, PES University, Sir M. Visvesvaraya Institute of Technology, Indian Institute of Management, International Institution of Information Technology, Jain University, and Christ University.

Dharwad, in the northern part of the state, is another hub for education with several engineering colleges. It has institutions of national importance like AIIMS, IIT Dharwad, IIIT Dharwad, Dakshina Hindi Prachara Sabha, and the Karnataka Institute of Medical Sciences. Universities like Karnataka University, University of Agricultural Sciences Dharwad, Karnataka State Law University, KLE University, and SDM University are present in Dharwad & Hubballi City. A central university is present in Kalaburgi. These developments are set to contribute significantly to Karnataka's economy by creating jobs, expanding educational opportunities, and spurring infrastructure development. Manipal Academy of Higher Education is located in Manipal, Udupi city.

== Industry ==
District-wise industries of Karnataka in 2024.

Karnataka became the manufacturing hub for some of the largest public sector industries of India after India's independence. Hindustan Aeronautics Limited, which is dedicated to research and development activities for indigenous fighter aircraft for the Indian Air Force, employs over 9,500 employees making it one of the largest public sector employers in Karnataka. India's national space agency, the Indian Space Research Organization, is headquartered in Bengaluru and employs approximately 20,000 people.

Other heavy industries such as National Aerospace Laboratories, Indian Telephone Industries, Bharat Earth Movers Limited, Bharat Electronics Limited, Hindustan Machine Tools and Indian subsidiaries of Volvo and Toyota, are also headquartered in Bengaluru. TVS Motors has a motorcycle manufacturing plant at Mysore and Tata Motors at Dharwad.

Karnataka houses several companies engaged in the manufacturing of electrical equipment and machinery, including Kirloskar, ABB, Kavika, and Larsen & Toubro. This sector is supported by the presence of the Central Power Research Institute in Bengaluru. Many multinational companies have set up their manufacturing units in Karnataka, such as BASF and Bosch.

The state owns sugar factories in the northern region, edible oil processing factories, pharmaceutical factories, textile processing centers, and steel producing facilities. The Vishwesharaiya steel plant at Bhadravati is run by Steel Authority of India Limited.

=== Minerals ===
Gold, iron ore, quartz, limestone, manganese, kyanite and bauxite are some of the minerals that are found in Karnataka. After the closure of the Kolar Gold Fields mine, the only company in India that produces gold by mining and extracting it from the ore is Hutti Gold Mines Limited, with plants at Hutti and Chitradurga in Karnataka. The major mines of manganese and iron ore are located at Sandur in the Bellary district. Visweswaraiah Iron and Steel Ltd. at Bhadravathi and Jindal Vijayanagar Steel Ltd. at Toranagallu are engaged in the production of iron and steel. Indian Aluminium Company Ltd. (Hindalco) has an aluminum plant near Belgaum. Mysore Minerals Limited is in the mining and production of chromite industry in Hassan district. Rajashree Cements at Adityanagar, Vasavadatta Cements at Sedam and The Associated Cement Company Ltd. at Wadi are engaged in the production of cement. Uranium deposits have been found in Deshnur, a small village near Belgaum.

Lithium has been discovered in Karnataka's Mandya district 100 km from Bengaluru, becoming the nation's first known lithium reserves, so far confirmed at 1,600 tonnes.

== Information and biotechnology ==
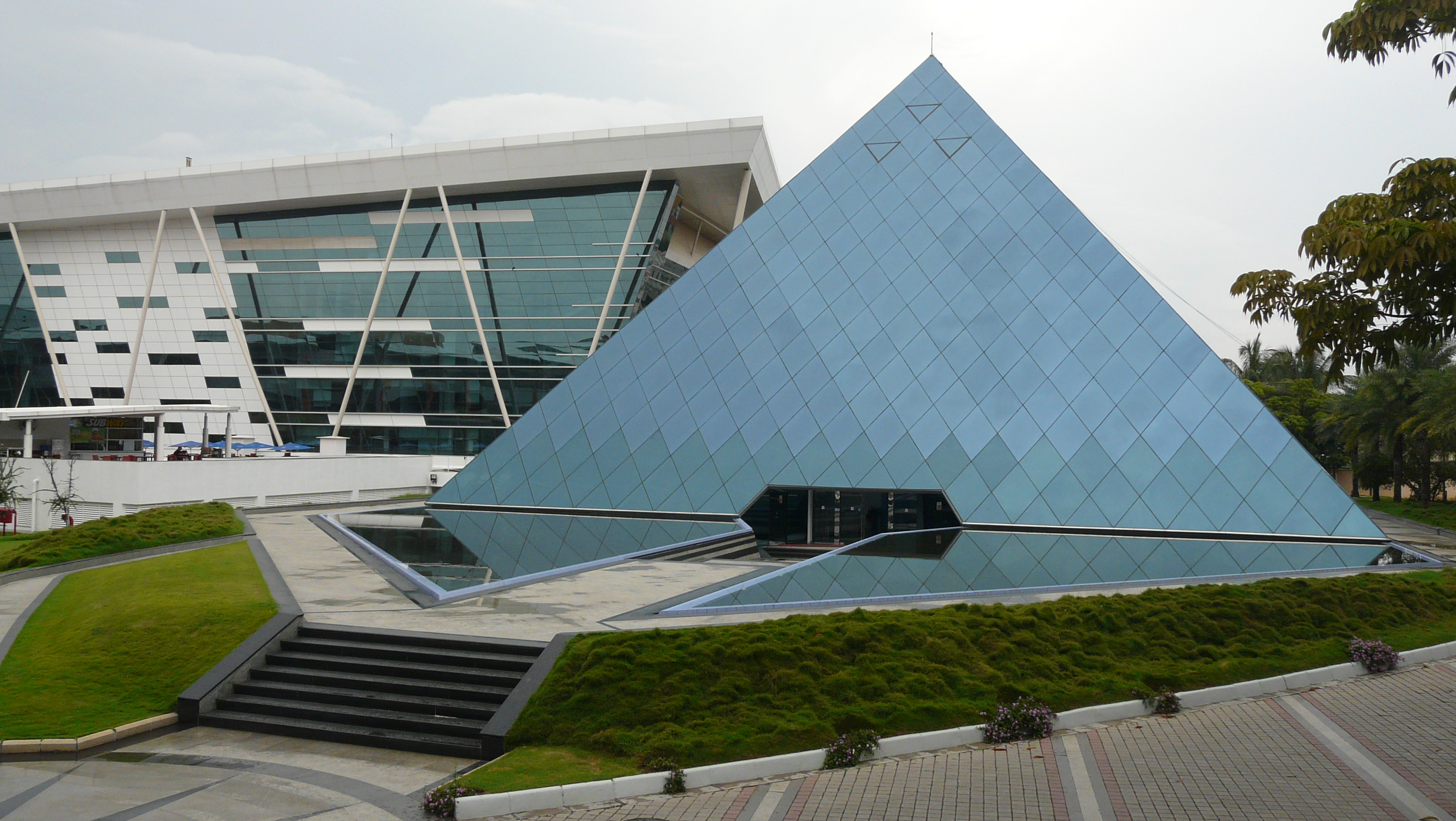
Infosys, Bengaluru

Karnataka is the leader in the information technology (IT) sector in India; its capital, Bengaluru, is known as the Silicon Valley of India. In the IT sector, Karnataka generated a total revenue of ₹ 516.5 billion in the financial year 2006–07 which included ₹ 487 billion from software exports and ₹ 29.5 billion from hardware exports. A total of 1973 companies in the state are involved in Information Technology-related business. While the bulk of the IT related companies are located in Bengaluru, some companies are located in Mysore and Mangalore as well. Bengaluru is also the headquarters of Wipro and Infosys which are among the top three IT companies in India in regards to market capitalization. The Nandi Hills area in Devanahalli outskirts is the site of the upcoming $22 Billion, 50 square kilometre BIAL IT Investment Region, one of the largest infrastructure projects in the history of Karnataka.

As of June 2006, Karnataka housed 55% of biotechnology related companies in India. Karnataka has over 6,800 scientists involved in biotech research. Out of twenty eight biotech companies that were registered in India in the year 2005–06, 27 were located in Karnataka. Bengaluru is also the home of the largest biocluster in India, having 158 of the 320 companies working on biotechnology in the country, with total revenues of ₹ 14 billion.

Over 400 Fortune 500 companies have offices in Karnataka.

== Banking ==
Karnataka, particularly the coastal districts of Dakshina Kannada and Udupi, is sometimes called the "cradle of banking" in India. This is because seven of the country's leading banks, Canara Bank, Syndicate Bank, Corporation Bank, Vijaya Bank, Karnataka Bank, Vysya Bank and the State Bank of Mysore originated in this state. The first five in the above list of banks were established in the districts of Dakshina Kannada and Udupi. These districts have among the best distribution of banks in India—a branch for every 500 persons. Between 1880 and 1935, twenty two banks were established in coastal Karnataka, nine of them in the city of Mangalore.

As of March 2009, Karnataka had 5,759 branches of different banks servicing the people of the state. The number of people served by each branch was 10,000 which was lesser than the national average of 15,000, thereby indicating better penetration of banking in the state.

== Infrastructure ==
=== Roads ===
The state is well connected to its six neighboring states and other parts of India through 14 National Highways (NH), which account for about six percent of the total NH network in India. Its district centers are linked through 114 State Highways (SH). The total road network of NH, SH, and district roads is approximately 207,379 km, of which 127,541 km (61.5 percent) is surfaced.

Road Type Road length (km)

- National highways: 4,396
- State highways: 28,311
- District roads: 19,801

=== Ports ===
Karnataka is served by both major and minor ports.

- New Mangalore Port (2010–11 data): Handled 67.30 million tonnes per annum (MTA) of total traffic, comprising 23.6 MTA in imports and 32.9 MTA in exports. The port accommodated 1,186 vessels, including 26 cruise vessels, generating US$65 million in revenue.
- Karwar Port (2007–08 data): Handled 2.7 MTA of total cargo, with total imports and exports reaching 6 MTA. It generated US$2.7 million in revenue and maintains 25 private liquid cargo tanks with a 75,000 MT capacity.

=== Airports ===
Karnataka is served by several domestic and international airports:

- International airports: Kempegowda International Airport in Bengaluru and Mangalore International Airport in Bajpe.
- Domestic airports: Belgaum Airport (planned for international status), Bidar Airport, Gulbarga Airport, Hubballi Airport, Mysore Airport, Shivamogga Airport, and Ballari Airport at Toranagallu.

==== International airports ====
- Kempegowda International Airport, Devanahalli – formerly Bengaluru International Airport
- Mangalore International Airport, Bajpe

=== Railways ===
Karnataka has a railway network of 3,836 km. The South Western Railway covers almost the entirety of Karnataka, and its headquarters are located in Hubballi. The platform at SSS Hubballi Junction holds the Guinness World Record for the longest railway platform in the world. The South Western Railway is divided into three divisions: Hubballi, Bengaluru, and Mysore. Additionally, there are two railway heritage museums in the state: the Railway Museum, Mysore and the Hubballi Railway Heritage Museum.

==== Urban transport ====
Metro rail and suburban rail projects are currently underway in Bengaluru. The first phase of the Namma Metro is complete, covering a total of 76.95 km, with the second phase under construction.

==== Ongoing projects ====
The Hassan–Sakhleshpura–Mangalore line gauge conversion has been completed. Both freight and passenger trains run on this route daily, connecting the seaport city of Mangaluru to the state capital of Bengaluru and Mysuru. Other key connectivity projects, such as the doubling of the Mysore–Bengaluru railway line, Gadag–Bagalkot, and Bengaluru–Hassan, are planned for the near future.

=== Power ===
- Generation: Power generation is managed by the Karnataka Power Corporation Limited (KPCL) and Independent Power Producers (IPPs) such as GMR, Jindal, and Bhoruka. KPCL has an installed capacity of over 9,315 MW serving 16.3 million consumers, while IPPs have an installed capacity of 2,005 MW.
- Transmission: Managed by the Karnataka Power Transmission Corporation Limited (KPTCL). The transmission network covers an area of 192,000 km^{2} with 1,205 substations. The infrastructure includes 28,000 km of 33 kV lines, 130,000 km of 11 kV lines, and 451,855 km of low-tension (LT) lines, supported by 150,000 distribution transformers.
- Distribution: Electricity supply is handled by regional Electricity Supply Companies (ESCOMs), including the Bangalore Electricity Supply Company (BESCOM), Mangalore Electricity Supply Company (MESCOM), Hubli Electricity Supply Company (HESCOM), Gulbarga Electric Supply Company (GESCOM), and Chamundeshwari Electric Supply Corporation (CESC).

=== Telecommunications ===
Leading telecom companies in the sectors of telecommunication network, basic telephony services (both wire line and wireless) and networking services for telecommunication equipment are operating in the state.

The entire state is networked via Optic FibreCables (OFC) by the state-run BSNL (formerly DOT) as well as private companies like Bharti, Reliance, Tata Communications and Tata Teleservices.

Last Mile Access is provided by BSNL as well as TATA Tele Services in various parts of the state. Bharti and Reliance Communications provide the Last Mile Access directly to the customer in all major cities in Karnataka.

Telecom service providers in Karnataka: BSNL, Bharti Airtel, Reliance Jio, Vodafone Idea

Key statistics (2007–08)

Cellular subscribers: about 10 million

Internet/broadband

Subscribers: about 0.8 million

Telecom towers: about 14,000

Post offices: 9,826

Telephone connections provided: 2,610

Telephone exchanges: 2,727

=== Industrial infrastructure ===
Karnataka Industrial Area Development Board (KIADB) and Karnataka State Industrial Investment Development Corporation (KSIIDC) are jointly responsible for the development of industrial infrastructure in the state.

Directorate of Commerce and Industries has set up a district and taluk industrial centres across the state to facilitate investment

The Government of Karnataka is promoting the development of several SEZs across Karnataka, such as a pharma and biotech SEZ, food processing and agro-based industries, a textiles SEZ at Hassan, and IT and Coastal SEZs at Mangalore.

Key industrial clusters

IT/ITES cluster in electronic city and Whitefield (Bengaluru).

Food Parks – 4 old State sponsored and 2 new MoFPI sponsored Food Parks in 6 Districts of Karnataka

Biotech park/cluster in electronic city, Bengaluru.

Integrated Food Parks in Hiriyur, Bagalkote, Jewargi & Malur for pay-n-use common facilities & MSME Food Processing Manufacturers

Machine tool cluster at Peenyaindustrial estate

Textile cluster at Doddaballapur

Foundry cluster at Belgaum

Industrial valve cluster at Hubli–Dharwad

Coir clusters at Hassan.

Handicrafts cluster at Channapatna.

Coffee production and processing cluster in Madekeri

SEZs in Karnataka

Notified: 27

Formal approvals: 52

In-principle approvals: 9

Source: StatewiseSEZs in India, www.sezindia.nic.in. accessed 23 September 2009

=== Water supply ===
The water supply is provided by the local authorities like municipalities and panchayats. The first hydroelectric plant in the state was built at Shivanasamudra Falls on the Kaveri River in 1902.

=== Electrical supply ===
Karnataka has an installed capacity of 27 gigawatts (GW) of electricity, of which 12 GW comes from renewable energy sources. The state is India's top producer of solar energy, with an installed capacity of 5.16 GW.

Karnataka Power Transmission Corporation Limited (KPTCL) is the sole provider of electricity for the state. The Linganamakki reservoir will supply around 35 percent of power to the state. Electric power from KPTCL is distributed through distribution companies like Bangalore Electricity Supply Company (BESCOM), Mangalore Electricity Supply Company (MESCOM), Gulbarga Electricity Supply Company (GESCOM), Hubli Electricity Supply Company (HESCOM) and Chamundesvary Electricity Supply Company (CESCOM) for different parts of the state. A good number of windmills were present. The Raichur Thermal Power Station and Bellary Thermal Power station Near Bellary (Kuduthini). Karnataka is also the location of companies like SELCO (India), which is promoting the use of solar electricity among the rural areas of the state and is also a twice winner of the Ashden Awards.

== Data ==
=== Annual growth of Gross State Domestic Product at Current Prices ===
year	GSDP		Growth rate
year	in ₹ Crore	in US$ Billion	Growth rate
2011-12	₹6,06,010 crore	US$71 billion	—
2012-13	₹6,95,413 crore	US$81 billion	▲14.8%
2013-14	₹8,16,666 crore	US$96 billion	▲17.4%
2014-15	₹9,13,923 crore	US$110 billion	▲11.9%
2015-16	₹10,45,168 crore	US$120 billion	▲14.4%
2016-17	₹12,07,608 crore	US$140 billion	▲15.5%
2017-18	₹13,33,240 crore	US$160 billion	▲10.4%
2018-19	₹14,79,391 crore	US$170 billion	▲11.0%
2019-20	₹16,15,827 crore	US$190 billion	▲8.9%
2020-21	₹16,40,811 crore	US$190 billion	▲0.9%
2021-22	₹19,92,029 crore	US$230 billion	▲20.8%
2022-23	₹24,26,071 crore	US$260 billion	▲14.2%
2023-24	₹25,93,567 crore	US$290 billion	▲10.2%
2024-25	₹29,06,063 crore	US$330 billion	▲13.79%
2025-26†	₹32,81,065 crore	US$357 billion	▲8.19%

† As per First Advance Estimates

=== District wise statistics ===
Gross District Domestic Product and Per Capita Income Year : 2024-25
District	Share of sectors			GDDP		PCI		#
District	Agriculture	Industry	Services	in ₹ Crore	US$ Billion	in ₹	US$	#
Bengaluru Urban	1.5% (▼0.2%)	13.9% (▼1.9%)	84.5% (▲2.1%)	₹11,73,574 crore	US$128 billion	₹8,55,960	US$9,313	Steady
Dakshina Kannada	6.8% (▼2.8%)	37.4% (▼1.5%)	55.8% (▲4.3%)	₹1,54,509 crore	US$16.8 billion	₹6,26,279	US$6,814	Steady
Udupi	13.7% (▼1.4%)	26.3% (▼1.6%)	60.0% (▲3.0%)	₹75,198 crore	US$8.18 billion	₹6,00,683	US$6,536	Steady
Chikkamagaluru	14.7% (▼9.1%)	30.5% (▲1.6%)	54.7% (▲7.4%)	₹59,955 crore	US$6.52 billion	₹4,94,787	US$5,385	Steady
Shivamogga	20.0% (▼3.3%)	23.1% (▲0.2%)	56.9% (▲3.2%)	₹78,037 crore	US$8.49 billion	₹3,89,743	US$4,241	▲1
Kodagu	41.0% (▼4.2%)	13.2% (▲0.1%)	45.8% (▲4.1%)	₹21,510 crore	US$2.34 billion	₹3,53,701	US$3,849	▲3
Bengaluru Rural	15.5% (▼2.6%)	27.6% (▼2.3%)	56.9% (▲4.9%)	₹43,485 crore	US$4.73 billion	₹3,49,559	US$3,804	▼2
Mandya	14.7% (▼1.2%)	21.9% (▼0.7%)	63.4% (▲1.9%)	₹66,775 crore	US$7.27 billion	₹3,06,448	US$3,712	▼1
Hasana	19.7% (▼1.6%)	16.2% (▼0.1%)	64.1% (▲1.7%)	₹66,247 crore	US$7.21 billion	₹3,38,877	US$3,688	▲1
Tumakuru	16.6% (▼3.0%)	30.1% ( 0.0%)	53.4% (▲3.1%)	₹1,00,988 crore	US$11 billion	₹3,34,980	US$3,645	▼2
Ballari	11.5% (▼1.1%)	28.2% (▼1.1%)	60.3% (▲2.2%)	₹59,928 crore	US$6.52 billion	₹3,24,111	US$3,527	Steady
Bengaluru South	17.9% (▲1.7%)	29.7% (▼2.3%)	52.5% (▲0.7%)	₹44,055 crore	US$4.18 billion	₹3,19,088	US$3,472	Steady
Chamarajanagara	28.7% (▲5.5%)	17.9% (▼2.2%)	53.3% (▼3.4%)	₹35,351 crore	US$3.85 billion	₹3,04,040	US$3,309	▲2
Dharawada	8.1% (▼0.2%)	23.5% (▼1.5%)	68.4% (▲1.7%)	₹68,591 crore	US$7.46 billion	₹3,00,627	US$3,271	Steady
Uttara Kannada	16.6% (▼4.4%)	20.5% (▲0.1%)	62.9% (▲4.2%)	₹48,509 crore	US$5.28 billion	₹2,95,116	US$3,211	▼2
Bagalakote	16.2% (▼3.0%)	27.7% ( 0.0%)	56.2% (▲3.1%)	₹65,909 crore	US$7.17 billion	₹2,79,919	US$3,046	Steady
Mysuru	16.2% (▼4.0%)	16.5% (▼0.4%)	67.3% (▲4.4%)	₹99,527 crore	US$10.83 billion	₹2,69,333	US$2,931	Steady
Chikkaballapura	21.7% (▼4.5%)	21.0% ( 0.0%)	57.3% (▲4.5%)	₹37,935 crore	US$4.13 billion	₹2,52,588	US$2,749	Steady
Kolar	20.4% (▲0.8%)	24.0% (▼1.6%)	55.6% (▲0.8%)	₹46,568 crore	US$5.07 billion	₹2,49,201	US$2,712	Steady
Davanagere	26.3% (▼5.6%)	21.6% (▲1.1%)	52.1% (▲4.5%)	₹47,801 crore	US$5.2 billion	₹2,42,159	US$2,635	Steady
Chitradurga	28.2% (▼3.9%)	15.7% (▲0.3%)	56.1% (▲3.6%)	₹45,577 crore	US$4.96 billion	₹2,27,554	US$2,476	Steady
Gadaga	13.9% (▼1.8%)	19.3% (▼0.7%)	66.8% (▲2.6%)	₹28,603 crore	US$3.11 billion	₹2,24,073	US$2,438	Steady
Haveri	18.0% (▼3.2%)	17.5% (▲0.1%)	64.4% (▲3.0%)	₹39,571 crore	US$4.31 billion	₹2,03,257	US$2,212	Steady
Vijayanagara	18.0% (▼3.1%)	25.5% (▲0.2%)	56.5% (▲2.9%)	₹37,307 crore	US$4.05 billion	₹1,93,230	US$2,100	▲1
Vijayapura	28.8% (▼6.2%)	19.0% (▲2.5%)	52.2% (▲3.7%)	₹54,785 crore	US$5.95 billion	₹1,87,429	US$2,037	▲1
Bidar	17.2% (▼4.3%)	16.5% (▲0.3%)	66.3% (▲4.6%)	₹39,798 crore	US$4.33 billion	₹1,85,079	US$2,011	▲1
Belagavi	19.5% (▼3.1%)	22.8% (▼0.5%)	57.7% (▲3.6%)	₹1,11,225 crore	US$12.10 billion	₹1,83,217	US$1,993	▲1
Koppal	27.7% (▼2.5%)	18.4% (▼0.3%)	53.9% (▲2.9%)	₹33,020 crore	US$3.59 billion	₹1,81,152	US$1,969	▲1
Raichuru	20.8% (▼9.9%)	18.4% (▲1.9%)	60.8% (▲8.0%)	₹45,167 crore	US$4.91 billion	₹1,78,888	US$1,944	▼5
Yadagiri	24.0% (▼5.9%)	17.6% (▲0.8%)	58.4% (▲5.2%)	₹26,517 crore	US$2.88 billion	₹1,64,388	US$1,786	Steady
Kalaburagi	13.1% (▼12.8%)	21.8% (▲2.7%)	65.1% (▲10.1%)	₹50,039 crore	US$5.44 billion	₹1,44,449	US$1,570	Steady

== See also ==
- Economy of Bengaluru
- Economy of Mangalore
- Mysore
