= Electricity supply companies in Karnataka =

Electricity Supply Companies in Karnataka
- Industry: Electricity
- Founded: 2002
- Headquarters: Karnataka, India
- Owner: Karnataka Government

The Electricity Supply Companies, also known as ESCOMs, are responsible for electric power distribution in state of Karnataka. Its origin was in Karnataka Electricity Board. This distribution entity was incorporated to provide efficient and reliable electric power supply to the people of Karnataka state.

Karnataka's electricity department is broadly classified into the following three major groups:

- Generation: Karnataka Power Corporation Limited
- Transmission: Karnataka Power Transmission Corporation Limited
- Distribution: Electricity Supply Companies (ESCOM's)

== History ==
In 1999, Karnataka embarked on a major reform of the power sector. As a first step, Karnataka Electricity Board (KEB) was dissolved and in its place, the Karnataka Power Transmission Corporation Limited (KPTCL) was incorporated.

This was followed by the constitution of Karnataka Electricity Regulatory Commission (KERC) in November 1999.

In the next phase of the reform process, the transmission and distribution business managed by KPTCL were unbundled in June 2002. The distribution companies were formed to distribute power in Karnataka.

== Distribution companies ==
- BESCOM, Bengaluru(Bangalore Electricity Supply Company Limited) has been entrusted with distribution of power to the districts of Bengaluru Urban, Bengaluru Rural, Kolar, Tumakuru, Ramanagara, Chikkaballapura, Chitradurga, and Davanagere.
- MESCOM, Mangaluru (Mangalore Electricity Supply Company Limited) has been entrusted with distribution of power to the districts of Dakshina Kannada, Udupi, Chikkamagaluru, and Shivamogga.
- HESCOM, Hubballi (Hubli Electricity Supply Company Limited) has been entrusted with distribution of power to the districts of Dharwad, Gadag, Vijayapura, Bagalkote, Uttara Kannada, Haveri, and Belagavi.
- GESCOM, Kalaburagi (Gulbarga Electricity Supply Company Limited) has been entrusted with distribution of power to the districts of Ballari, Bidar, Kalaburagi, Koppala, Raichuru, Yadagiri, and Vijayanagara.
- CESC, Mysuru (Chamundeshwari Electricity Supply Corporation) has been entrusted with distribution of power to the districts of Mysuru, Chamarajanagara, Mandya, Hassan, and Kodagu.
