= Escom =

Escom or ESCOM may refer to:

- Escom AG, a defunct German computer corporation
- Escom LLC, Internet corporation best known as the former owner of the "sex.com" web domain
- ESCOM IPN, the Superior School of Computer Sciences of the National Polytechnic Institute of Mexico
- École supérieure de chimie organique et minérale, a French grande école for chemical engineering
- Eskom, South African electricity public utility, known as ESCOM until 1986
- Electricity Supply Commission of Malawi (ESCOM), Ltd, state-owned power producing company in Malawi
- Electricity supply companies in Karnataka, companies providing electrictity in Karnataka, commonly called ESCOM
- European Society for the Cognitive Sciences of Music, non-profit learned society supporting research in the cognitive sciences of music
