= Sharavathi Pumped Storage Hydropower Project =

Proposed Power plant in India

- A diagram showing the internals of a pumped storage power facility in the USA
- Location: Western Ghats, Karnataka, India
- Coordinates: 14°11′43″N 74°46′43″E
- Status: On hold
- Owner: Government of Karnataka
- Operator: Karnataka Power Corporation Limited

Power generation
- Units planned: 8 × 250 MWe
- Nameplate capacity: 2000MWe

The Sharavathi Pumped Storage Hydropower Project (SPSHP) is a proposed pumped storage power plant proposed to be built on the course of the Sharavathi river in the Indian state of Karnataka in the valley of the Western ghats. It would have an installed capacity of 2000MWe and would use Francis turbines. It was put on hold and is under review by the Government of India citing environmental concerns. If built, it would be one of the largest pumped storage hydroelectric project in the country.

The National Board for Wildlife gave the principal approval for the project in July 2025. The in-principle approval for the Sharavathi Pumped Storage Hydroelectric Project, despite serious ecological concerns raised over its impact on the Sharavathi Valley Lion-tailed Macaque Sanctuary in the Western Ghats has caused concern among locals and environment activists.

In March 2026, protests against the project were held at Shivmoga District in Karnataka which demanded scrapping the project

== History ==
The project was under discussion since 2004. It was proposed to construct a pumped storage power plant in Karnataka so as to utilise the surplus power in the grid during low demand period to pump the water from the lower reservoir to the upper reservoir and use it to produce power during peak demand hours. Initially planned for 500MWe, it was later upgraded to 2000MWe with eight 250 MWe Francis turbine (reversible pump) units.

The project has been kept on hold as per the order issued by the Government of India in November 2025 citing environmental damage and loss of forests and biodiversity in the region. Around 15000 trees across 57 hectors of land were being affected and were planned to be cut down for the project, many of which are endangered or threatened species, potentially leading to an ecological disaster.

Environmental activists say that they will not allow the project to proceed and demanded a Central Government Gazette to cancel the project completely.
