= Yermarus Thermal Power Station =

Building in India

Yermarus Thermal Power station
- Location of the Yermarus Power station
- Country: India
- Location: Yegnur, Raichur, Karnataka
- Coordinates: 16°17′28″N 77°21′9″E
- Status: Operational
- Commission date: Unit 1: May, 2015; Unit 2: Mar, 2017
- Owner: Karnataka Power Corporation
- Operator: RPCL

Thermal power station
- Primary fuel: Coal

Power generation
- Units operational: 800 MW
- Make and model: BHEL
- Nameplate capacity: 1600 MW

Yermarus Thermal Power Station is a coal-based thermal power plant located in Yermarus village in Raichur district, Karnataka.

== History ==
The power plant is owned and operated by the Karnataka Power Corporation. This is India's first 800 MW super critical thermal power plant and Bharat Heavy Electricals is the EPC contractor for this power project.

== Capacity ==
The installed capacity of the power plant in 1600 MW (2×800 MW).

Stage	Unit Number	power (MW)	Date of Commissioning	Status
1st	1	800	2015 MAY	commissioned and commercial operation declared in March 2017
1st	2	800	2017 Mar	commissioned and commercial operations started in April 2017
