= Raichur Thermal Power Station =

Coal power plant in Karnataka, India

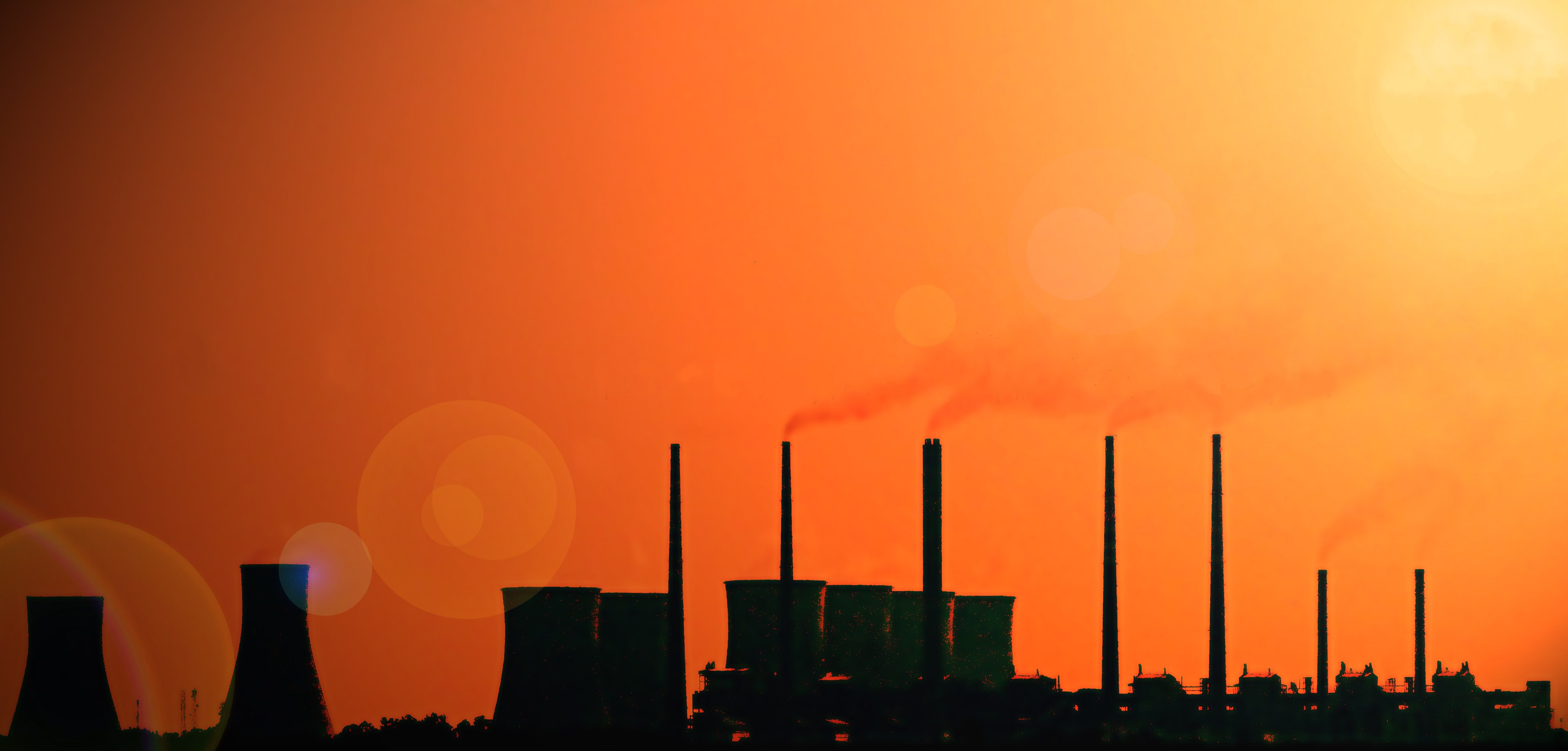
- Location of the Raichur Thermal Power Stationb in Karnataka.
- Country: India
- Location: Raichur district, Karnataka.
- Coordinates: 16°21′18″N 77°20′31″E
- Status: Operational
- Commission date: Unit 1 & 2: 1986; Unit 3 & 4: 1994; Unit 5 & 6: 1999; Unit 7: 2002; Unit 8: 2013
- Operator: KPCL

Thermal power station
- Primary fuel: Coal

Power generation
- Units operational: 7 X 210 MW 1 X 250 MW
- Nameplate capacity: 1,720 MW

External links
- Commons: Related media on Commons

Raichur Thermal Power Station (RTPS) is a coal-fired electric power station located at Yadlapur D(Shaktinagar) in the Raichur district of the state of Karnataka, India. It is operated by the Karnataka Power Corporation Limited (KPCL) and was the first thermal power plant to be set up in the state. The power station was commissioned during various periods from 1985 and it accounts for about 70% of the total electricity generated in Karnataka.

== Establishment ==
The project to construct the thermal power station was finalized in 1978 after an MOU was signed between KPCL and the Karnataka State Electricity Board. TCE Consulting Engineers Ltd., a Tata Group company was appointed as the consultants for the project. The project involved two stages: Stage I, in which Units 1 and 2 were expected to be installed and Stage II, Units 3 and 4. each unit was expected to have an installed capacity of 210 MW. An area of 300 hectares was allocated for the units. Unit I of the plant was completed in March 1985, with Unit II following in March 1986.

The construction of Unit III was started in 1986 and completed in March 1991 and the Unit IV was started in 1989 and completed in September 1994, thereby completing the Stage II. The total cost of Stage I of the project was Rs. 4,030,000,000 and of the Stage II was Rs. 9,830,000,000. The generators were supplied by Bharat Heavy Electricals Limited and the turbines by Kraftwerk Union AG (KWU) and Mitsubishi. In 1996, a further expansion of the plant was carried out, with an investment of Rs. 15,450,000,000.

Units 5 and 6 (each of 210 MW) were installed within three years. Unit 7 (210 MW) which was completed within a record time of 25 months, was installed at the end of the year 2002 The total installed capacity of the power plant is 1,470 MW (7 x 210 MW). As of 2007, Unit 8, with an installed capacity of 250 MW, is being constructed and is expected to be operational by September 2009.

Stage I (units 1 and 2) costing Rs. 403 crores in 1986.

Stage II (units 3 and 4) costing Rs. 983 crores in 1994.

Stage III (units 5 and 6) costing Rs. 1545 crores in 1999.

Stage IV (unit 7) costing Rs. 613 crores in 2002.

Stage IV (unit 8) costing Rs. 945 crores in 2010

== Raw materials ==
RTPS uses coal for generation of electricity. Its daily requirement of coal is about 20,000 metric tons, when running at full capacity, which is delivered from Western Coalfields Ltd. and Mahanadi Coalfields Ltd. The coal supplied is sampled using a computerized system and sent to the laboratory for testing. This ensures that the proper grade of coal is used.

The plant has also started to use washed coal, due to its lower ash content.

The plant's cooling water is pumped from the Krishna River nearby.

== Electricity production ==
The coal is pulverized and fed into furnaces that convert water into steam. This steam runs the turbines to generate electricity. Units 1 to 7, each can produce 5.04 MU of energy per day and Unit 8 can produce 6 MU per day, hence the plant can produce 41.28 MU of energy per day when it is functioning at full capacity.

== Issues ==
RTPS generates about 1.5 million tonnes of fly ash annually which causes environmental problems. 20% of the ash produced is wet bottom ash which is let into the ash bund. Though considered safer than fly-ash, bottom ash has also been found to contain heavy metals which can be dangerous to public health. The fly-ash which gets generated during the burning of coal disperses into the air and hence pollutes the atmosphere. This gets deposited on the surrounding land, thereby making the land infertile. The fly-ash may also cause breathing problems for humans. RTPS has taken steps to ensure that fly-ash gets precipitated out of the air by using electrostatic elements in the furnaces, but about 2% of fly-ash gets into the atmosphere. The fly-ash is disposed of by converting it into a wet slurry and dumping it into vacant tracts of land (which become what are known as ash-ponds). This is not environment friendly and hence RTPS has come up with ways to make better use of fly-ash. It has entered into a collaboration with the Indo-Norwegian Environment Programme (INEP) and has set up a technology demonstration center called CASHUTEC (Center for Ash Utilization and Environment Conservation) near its plant. CASHUTEC demonstrates different uses for fly ash; mainly its use in the construction sector for making bricks, blocks and mosaic tiles.
