= École supérieure de chimie organique et minérale =

Chemical engineering school in France

École Supérieure de Chimie Organique et Minérale (ESCOM) is a French grande école located in Compiègne, France. It is a private school founded in 1957.

Students graduate with a master's degree in chemical engineering, with emphasis on the study of organic and inorganic chemistry. Work experience in the field, materialized by internships within corporate or research environments, is required from students throughout their curriculum.

In September 1991, ESCOM relocated from Paris to Cergy-Pontoise and in September 2008, it moved again to Compiègne.
