= Bangalore Electricity Supply Company =

- Logo of Bangalore Electricity Supply Company
- Trade name: BESCOM
- Type: Public utility
- Industry: Electricity
- Incorporated: India
- Founded: June 1, 2002; 24 years ago in Bengaluru, India
- Founder: Government of Karnataka
- Headquarters: K.R. Circle, Ambedkar Veedhi, Bengaluru, Karnataka, India
- Number of locations: Surroundings of Bengaluru in: 9 circles; 32 divisions; 147 sub-divisions; 534 section offices
- Area served: 41,092 sq/kms incl.: Bangalore Urban; Bangalore Rural; Chikkaballapura; Kolar; Davanagere; Tumkur; Chitradurga; Ramanagara
- Owner: Government of Karnataka
- Parent: Government of Karnataka; Karnataka Power Transmission Corporation
- Subsidiaries: Bangalore Metropolitan area zone North (BMAZ North); Bangalore Metropolitan area zone South (BMAZ South); Bangalore Rural area zone (BRAZ); Chitradurga zone (CTAZ)
- Website: bescom.karnataka.gov.in

Bangalore Electricity Supply Company (BESCOM) is an Indian electricity supplier in Karnataka state.

BESCOM distributes electricity in eight districts of Karnataka namely Bangalore Urban, Bangalore Rural, Chikkaballapura, Kolar, Davanagere, Tumkur, Chitradurga and Ramanagara.

== Company ==
The company was formed on 1 June 2002. BESCOM's electricity distribution covers an area of 41,092 sq/kms. with a population of over 20.7 million. BESCOM operates in four zones namely:

- Bangalore Metropolitan area zone North (BMAZ North)
- Bangalore Metropolitan area zone South (BMAZ South)
- Bangalore Rural area zone (BRAZ)
- Chitradurga zone (CTAZ), and in 9 circles, 32 divisions, 147 sub-divisions and 534 section offices.

An electricity meter bill generation device of BESCOM in Bengaluru (2026)

== See also ==
- Mangalore Electricity Supply Company Limited
