= Bellary Thermal Power station =

- Country: India
- Location: Kudatini, Bellary, Karnataka
- Coordinates: 15°11′31.5″N 76°43′03.8″E
- Status: Operational
- Commission date: Unit 1: March, 2007
- Owner: Karnataka Power Corporation
- Operator: Karnataka Power Corporation

Thermal power station
- Primary fuel: Coal

Power generation
- Units operational: 2 × 500 MW; 1 × 700 MW
- Make and model: Bhel
- Nameplate capacity: 1700 MW

Bellary Thermal Power station is located in Kudatini Village, Bellary District in the Indian state of Karnataka. Two coal-fired units of 500 MW each are in operation with generating capacity of 12 million units per day and a 700 MW coal-fired unit with operation The thermal electric power generating station is run by KPCL a government of Karnataka undertaking. This electric generating plant is located at Kudatini village on Hosapete–Ballari Road.

== Capacity ==
The plant has three power-generating units involving one 700 MW super-critical boiler technology.

| Stage | Unit number | Installed capacity (MW) | Date of commissioning |
|---|---|---|---|
| 1st | 1 | 1 x 500 | 03.12.2007 |
| 2nd | 2 | 1 x 500 | 27.01.2012 |
| 3rd | 3 | 700 | Mar 2016 |
