= Karnataka Power Corporation =

Power generation company in Karnataka, India

Karnataka Power Corporation Limited
- Company type: Public
- Industry: Electricity generation
- Founded: 1970
- Headquarters: Bengaluru, Karnataka, India
- Key people: Gourav Gupta, IAS, Managing Director & Gangadhar MR, Technical Director
- Products: Electricity
- Revenue: ▲INR 7744.20 crores(2019)
- Net income: ▲INR 254.35 crores (2019)
- Number of employees: 4429
- Website: http://www.karnatakapower.com/

Karnataka Power Corporation Limited (or KPCL) is a company owned by the government of Karnataka, and is engaged in generating electrical power in the state of Karnataka in India. The modes for generation of electric power are hydroelectric, thermal, diesel, gas, wind and solar. The company was started on 20.07.1970 due to a vision of the Karnataka government for separate entities for generation and distribution of electric power. This was done, long before world bank dictated power sector reforms were initiated in early 21st century in India. Karnataka Power Corporation Limited began its journey with a humble beginning in 1970. With an installed capacity of 746 MW (1970), it has expanded its capacity to 8738.305 MW (2019). A revenue of Rs.77442 Million in 2019 as compared, to Rs.1.30 Million in 1971, speaks volumes about KPCL's progress.

== Power projects in Karnataka ==
KPCL has 34 dams (including the main, pickup and saddle dams) and 24 power stations across the state with power production capabilities ranging from 0.35 MW to 1035 MW. The hydroelectric projects of Karnataka Power Corporation Limited are built mainly across rivers Kaveri (Cauvery), Sharavathi, Kali, Krishna, Tungabhadra and their tributaries. The total installed capacity of KPCL is 8846.305 MW. The corporation has its thermal power station at Raichur And two more thermal project at Bellary of 500 MW station. The installed capacity of the thermal power station is 1720 MW (210 MW ×7units+1x250MW) at Raichur and 1700MW (2x500MW+1x700MW) at Bellary. The total gross power generation per annum is in the order of 10,362 GW·h at a plant load factor (PLF) 80% and 11,589 GW·h at a plant load factor of 90%. The corporation, in order to increase generation, has planned one moreadditional units in Bellary of 1x700MW, The corporation has Yermarus Thermal Power Station under construction at Yermarus, Raichur of capacity, with two units of 800MW each.

== Installed capacity ==
The power stations of Karnataka are:

Power Station	Type	Number of Units	Capacity (MW)	Total
Raichur Thermal Power station	Thermal	7 + 1	7x210 + 1x250	1720
Bellary Thermal Power station	Thermal	2 + 1	2x500 + 1x700	1700
Yermarus Thermal Power Station	Thermal	2	2x800	1600
Sharavathi	Hydel	10	103.5	1035
Nagjhari	Hydel	6	150	900
Varahi River	Hydel	4	115	460
Almatti Dam	Hydel	5 + 1	5x55 + 1x15	290
Gerusoppa	Hydel	4	60	240
Kadra Dam	Hydel	3	50	150
Kodasalli Dam	Hydel	3	40	120
Supa Dam	Hydel	2	50	100
MGHE-2	Hydel	4	21.6	86.4
Linganamakki Dam	Hydel	2	27.5	55
MGHE-1	Hydel	4	13.2	52.8
Bhadra right bank-1	Hydel	1	7.2	7.2
Bhadra right bank-2	Hydel	1	6	6
Bhadra left bank-1	Hydel	2	12	24
Bhadra left bank-2	Hydel	1	2	2
Mani	Hydel	2	4.5	9
Ghataprabha	Hydel	2	16	32
Shivanasamudra-1	Hydel	4	6	24
Shivanasamudra-2	Hydel	6	3	18
Shimshapura	Hydel	2	8.6	17.2
Munirabad-1	Hydel	2	9	18
Munirabad-2	Hydel	1	10	10
Mallapura	Mini	2	4.5	9
Sirwar	Mini	1	1	1
Kalmala	Mini	1	0.4	0.4
Ganekal	Mini	1	0.35	0.35
Kappatagudda-1	Wind	9	0.225	2.025
Kappatagudda-2	Wind	11	0.230	2.53
Yalesandra Solar PV Plant, Kolar Dist	Solar Project	1	3	3
Yapaldinni Solar PV Plant, Raichur Dist	Solar Project	1	3	3
Simsha Solar PV Plant, Shimshapur Mandya Dist	Solar Project	1	5	5
Itnal Solar PV Plant, Belgaum Dist	Solar Project	1	3	3
Total	--	--	--	8846.305

== See also ==
- KPTCL
- MESCOM
- BESCOM
- GESCOM
- HESCOM
- CESCOM
- PCKL
- KERC
