= Chamundeshwari Electricity Supply Corporation =

Electricity transmission and distribution company in Karnataka, India

- Chamundeshwari Electricity Supply Corporation (Mysore) logo
- Native name: ಚಾಮುಂಡೇಶ್ವರಿ ವಿದ್ಯುತ್ ಸರಬರಾಜು ನಿಗಮ
- Type: Public utility
- Industry: Power
- Predecessors: Karnataka Power Transmission Corporation; Mangalore Electricity Supply Company Limited
- Founded: 2005; 21 years ago
- Headquarters: Mysore, Karnataka, India
- Areas served: 27,858 square km.; Chamarajanagar; Hassan; Kodagu; Mandya; Mysore
- Key people: Chairman
- Revenue: ▲₹2,991.06 crore (2015–16); ₹2,882.25 crore (2014–15)
- Net income: ▼₹7.92 crore (2015–16); ₹40.27 crore (2014–15)
- Number of employees: 5,066 (March 2013)
- Website: cescmysore.karnataka.gov.in/en

The Chamundeshwari Electricity Supply Corporation Limited (CESC Mysore) is a company that provides electricity to five districts in the Indian State of Karnataka. It was carved out of Mangalore Electricity Supply Company Limited in 2005 and has its headquarters in Mysore. It is an undertaking of the government of Karnataka.

== History ==
Electricity was distributed in the five districts of Chamarajanagar, Hassan, Kodagu, Mandya, Mysore by Karnataka Power Transmission Corporation (KPTCL) since its formation in 1999 to 2002. Mangalore Electricity Supply Company Limited (MESCOM) was one of four companies that was formed in 2002 from KPTCL, and it distributed to these districts. CESC was carved out of MESCOM in 2005 to meet the increasing demand for power. Kodagu was added to its jurisdiction in 2006.
