= Karnataka Power Transmission Corporation =

Electricity company in Karnataka

Karnataka Power Transmission Corporation Limited
- KPTCL logo
- Native name: ಕರ್ನಾಟಕ ವಿದ್ಯುತ್ ಪ್ರಸರಣ ನಿಗಮ ನಿಯಮಿತ
- Type: Public company
- Industry: Power Transmission
- Predecessor: Karnataka Electricity Board
- Founded: 1 August 1999 (27 years ago)
- Headquarters: Bengaluru, India
- Area served: Karnataka
- Key people: K. J. George, Chairman; Pankaj Kumar Pandey, IAS MD; Vijay.B.P., KAS, Director (Administration and Human Resource)
- Products: Power Transmission
- Revenue: ▲₹ 2,875.43 crore (2015–16); ₹ 2395.80 crore (2014–15)
- Subsidiaries: Mangalore Electricity Supply Company; Bangalore Electricity Supply Company; Hubli Electricity Supply Company; Gulbarga Electricity Supply Company; Chamundeshwari Electricity Supply Corporation
- Website: kptcl.karnataka.gov.in

The Karnataka Power Transmission Corporation Limited, also known as KPTCL, is the sole electricity transmission and distribution company in state of Karnataka. Its origin was in Karnataka Electricity Board. Until 2002, the Karnataka Electricity Board (KEB) handled electricity transmission and distribution across the state. It was then broken up, with Karnataka Power Transmission Corporation Ltd (KPTCL) established to manage the transmission business.. KPTCL is Karnataka state government enterprise. This electricity transmission and distribution entity was corporatised to provide efficient and reliable electric power supply to the people of Karnataka state. KPTCL scope of work includes the handling of large projects in the field of energy.

An electricity meter bill generation device of BESCOM in Bengaluru (2026)

Karnataka Power Transmission Corporation Limited (KPTCL) has started using drone technology with sensors to spot the defects along its electricity transmission lines spread all over the Karnataka state.

Day wise Electricity load curve of Karnataka state can be accessed.

== Zones and circles ==
Zone Name	Description
MESCOM	Mangalore Electricity Supply Company
BESCOM	Bangalore Electricity Supply Company
HESCOM	Hubli Electricity Supply Company
GESCOM	Gulbarga Electricity Supply Company
CESCOM	Chamundeshwari Electricity Supply Corporation

ESCOMS buy power from power generating companies like Karnataka Power Corporation Limited (KPCL) a Karnataka state government undertaking and other IPPs (Independent Power Producers) like GMR, Jindal, Lanco(UPCL) etc., and pay transmission charge as per KERC tariff to KPTCL for transmitting the electric power.

== Governance ==
Company is governed under the purview of Ministry of Energy. Department is headed by a cabinet grade minister. Currently Siddaramaiah is the minister under the chief ministership of him.

== Criticism ==
The Bangalore Electricity Supply Company (Bescom) came under intense criticism with its telephonic helpline number 1912, due to rampant power cuts, after which Bescom added mobile numbers to its existing call answering facilities for different regions in the city.
