= Mangalore Electricity Supply Company Limited =

Indian electricity supplier

- Logo of Mangalore Electricity Supply Company Limited
- Type: Public utility
- Industry: Power
- Founded: June 2002 (24 years ago)
- Founder: Government of Karnataka
- Headquarters: MESCOM Bhavan, Kavoor Cross Road, Bejai, Mangaluru, Karnataka, India
- Number of locations: 14 (Divisions); 63 (Subdivisions)
- Areas served: Shivamogga district; Udupi district; Chikkamagaluru district; Dakshina Kannada district
- Key people: Managing Director- Raji Jayakumar
- Owner: Government of Karnataka
- Parent: Government of Karnataka; Karnataka Power Transmission Corporation
- Website: http://www.mesco.in/aboutus/index.asp

Mangalore Electricity Supply Company Limited (abbreviated as MESCOM) is an Indian electricity supplier to the districts of Karnataka namely Dakshina Kannada, Udupi district, Chickmagalur and Shimoga. It has its headquarters at Mangaluru. The company was formed in June 2002.

Karnataka Electricity Board (KEB) which was earlier involved in transmission and distribution of electricity in state of Karnataka was corporatised into Karnataka Power Transmission Corporation Limited (KPTCL).

Later distribution wing was carved out of this company and five companies were formed to cater distribution of electricity to different regions of Karnataka state. Initially four entities were formed first namely MESCOM, BESCOM, HESCOM and GESCOM. Later CESCOM was carved out of MESCOM in 2005 to cater electricity consumers of Mysore region.

Currently KPTCL looks after only Transmission and the Electricity Supply Companies (ESCOM's) look after distribution. The distribution of electricity to last mile or end users is done by this Electricity Supply Companies (ESCOM's) in the state of Karnataka. The electricity generated by Karnataka Power Corporation Limited and other producers is distributed by these ESCOM's.

MESCOM tried an idea of using drones to put electricity supply lines across a river Kumaradhara and was successful. It has 22,61,785 consumers, 755.66 kilometre length of 33 kilovolt (kV) electric power line and 34,507.71 kilometre length of 11 kilovolt (kV) line as of November 2017.

The electricity bills of MESCOM can be paid online by its customers. As Mangalore Electricity Supply Company Limited supplies electricity to high rainfall region of India, it suffers extensive damage to its infrastructure, properties during Southwest monsoon season in the months of June, July, August, September every year. Mangalore Electricity Supply Company Limited (mescom) has formed monsoon gang to tackle rain related problems. Mescom is facing shortage of powermen (linemen) which is affecting maintenance of electricity distribution network to ensure electricity supply for end users as per K. Harish Kumar, Chairman of Mangalore Electricity Supply Company Limited Consumers are not satisfied with the service provided by MESCOM

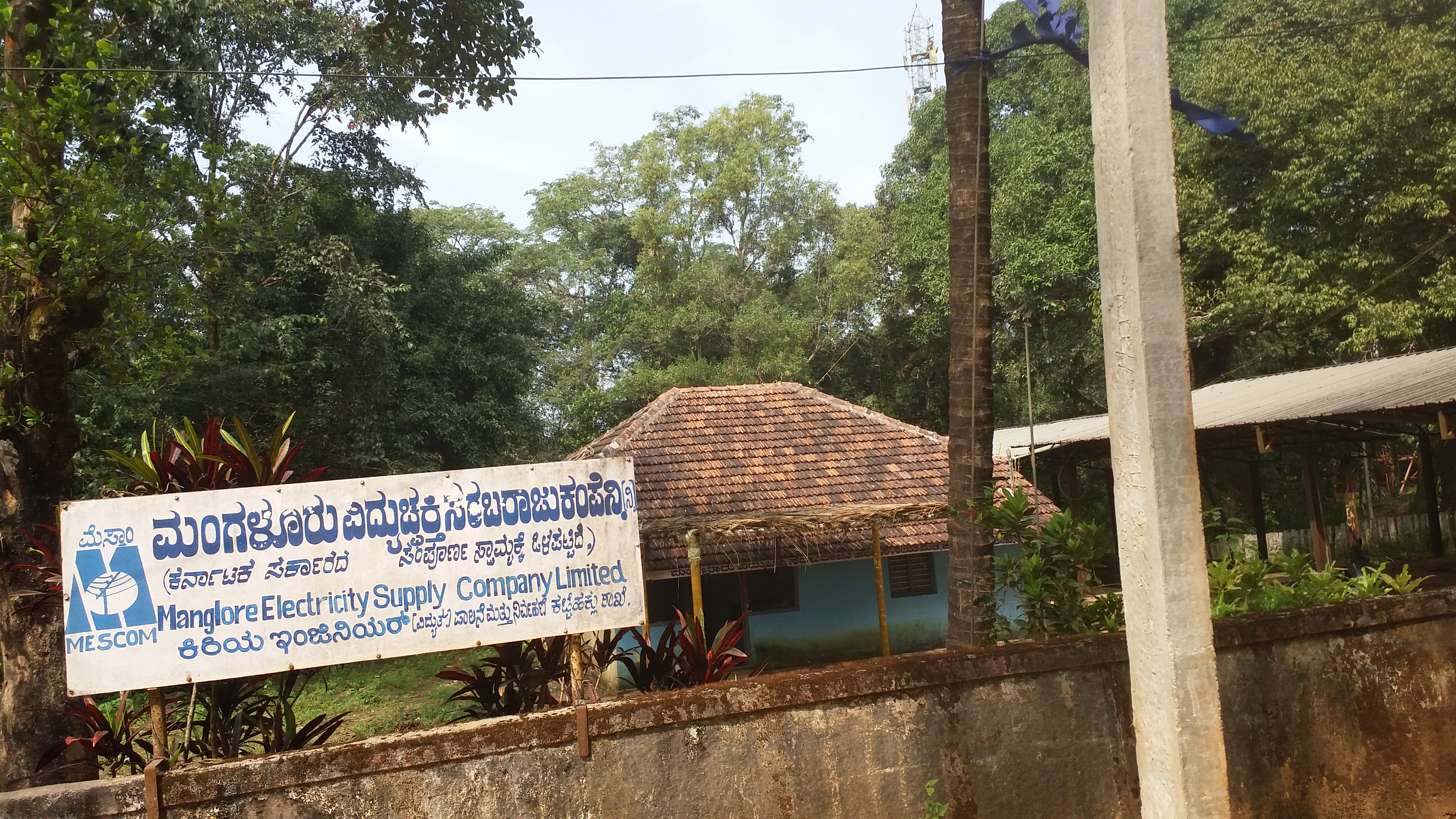
Office of MESCOM J.E. at Kattehaklu

== See also ==
- Solar power in India
- Karnataka Power Corporation Limited
