= Gopalakrishnan =

Gopalakrishnan, Gopalakrishna, Gopalkrishna, and variant spellings, refer to Gopal (Krishna), and are used as both a given name and a surname in India.

People with these surnames include:

== Gopalakrishna ==
- Gopalakrishna Adiga, a Kannada poet
- Gopalakrishna Bharati, a 19th-century Tamil poet and composer

== Gopalakrishnan ==
- Adoor Gopalakrishnan (born 1941), also known as Moutatthu Gopalakrishnan Unnithan, Indian film director, script writer, and producer
- A. P. M. Gopalakrishnan (born 1947), Indian cricketer
- Chelangatt Gopalakrishnan (1932–2010), Indian journalist and film historian, known for his work on Malayalam cinema
- M. S. Gopalakrishnan (1931–2013), Indian classical music violin exponent
- Omana (died 2003) and Moscow Gopalakrishnan (1931–2011), husband-and-wife duo noted for their translation of Russian books into Malayalam
- R. Gopalakrishnan (disambiguation), several people with this name, including
  - R. Gopalakrishnan, Indian businessman and author, former executive director of Tata Sons
- Suresh Gopalakrishnan, American engineer
- T. V. Gopalakrishnan, Chennai-based musician

== Gopalkrishna ==
- Gopalkrishna Gandhi, an Indian diplomat and a grandson of Mahatma Gandhi

== See also ==
- All pages with Gopalakrishnan in the title
- All pages with Gopalkrishnan in the title
- All pages with Gopalakrishna in the title
- All pages with Gopalkrishna in the title
