= Fineotex Chemical =

Speciality chemical-producing group pvt ltd

Fineotex Chemical Limited
- Type: Public
- Traded as: BSE: 533333; NSE: FCL
- Industry: Chemicals
- Founded: 1979
- Headquarters: Mumbai, Maharashtra, India
- Key people: Surendra Tibrewala (Chairman & Managing Director); Sanjay Tibrewala (Executive Director & CFO); Aarti Jhunjhunwala (Executive Director)
- Products: Specialty Textile chemicals
- Operating income: ▲₹129.48 crore (2021)
- Net income: ▲₹145 crore (2021)
- Number of employees: 350+
- Subsidiaries: Fineotex Malaysia Limited
- Website: www.fineotex.com

Fineotex Chemical Limited (BSE: 533333), (NSE: FCL) (ISO 9001:2015, ISO 14001:2015 and OHSAS 18001:2007 certified) is a speciality chemical-producing group with its headquarters in Mumbai, India. Fineotex is engaged in manufacturing of Speciality Performance Chemicals and Enzymes for Textile and Garment Industry, Water Treatment Industry, Leather Industry, Construction Industry, Paint Industry Agrochemicals, Adhesives and others. The plants of Fineotex are located in Navi Mumbai, Ambernath in India, and Selangor in Malaysia.

Fineotex has been named as one of India's Top 1000 Companies by National Stock Exchange of India.

== History ==
Fineotex group was founded by Surendra Tibrewala in 1979. Later, in 2004, it was incorporated as a private limited company under the name of Fineotex Chemical Pvt Ltd in the State of Maharashtra. In 2007, the company changed its name to Fineotex Chemical and went public with a listing on the Bombay Stock Exchange and the National Stock Exchange.

Fineotex is the only textile chemical company in India to be listed in the Indian stock market. In the year 2007, Fineotex earned ISO 9001:2000 certificate from JAS-ANZ. In 2011, the company incorporated a Wholly Owned Subsidiary company in Malaysia named Fineotex Malaysia Limited. It also acquired a controlling stake in Malaysian manufacturing company Biotex. In the year 2014, the company was accredited with ISO 4001:2004. 14045:2012, 9001:2015, 14001:2015, 45001:2018, 22000:2018 and SA 8000. In 2015, Fineotex was recognized as Star Export House by Directorate General of Foreign Trade, Ministry of Commerce and Industry.

In the year 2020, Fineotex entered into the home care and hygiene segment to serve the surge in its demand in the wake of the COVID-19 pandemic.

In September 2021, Fineotex made and announcement of its partnership with Eurodye-CTC, a textile chemical company based in Belgium for commercialization of specialty chemicals for the Indian market. The company has inked an MOU with Synthetic & Art Silk Mills' Research Association (Sasmira) to set up its Research & Development centre at Worli Hill, Mumbai.

== Awards and recognition ==
- On 20 December 2017, Fineotex was awarded the Fastest Growing Manufacturer Chemical Company by Investors' Protection Fund (IPF) at Bombay Stock Exchange.
- In 2022, earned the certification of being a 'Great Place to Work.

== See also ==
- Castrol India
- Clariant Chemicals
- Cochin Minerals and Rutile Limited
