= R. Gopalakrishnan (disambiguation) =

R. Gopalakrishnan (Ramabadran Gopalakrishnan) is an Indian businessman and author, former executive director of Tata Sons.

R. Gopalakrishnan may also refer to:

- R. Gopalakrishnan, a.k.a. Gopalakrishnan Raghavan Nair, who has made a film and written a book about the first Malayalam filmmaker JC Daniel
- R. Gopalakrishnan (politician) (born 1968), an Indian politician and Member of Parliament elected from Tamil Nadu
- R. Gopalakrishnan Nair (born 1931), an Indian politician who represented Neyyattinkara in the third Kerala Legislative Assembly
