= Buddinni =

Buddinni Buddinni
- Village
- Location within Karnataka Location within India
- Coordinates: 16°1′57″N 76°38′52″E
- Country: India
- State: Karnataka
- District: Raichur district
- Taluk: Maski
- Named for: historical events

Population
  - Total: 1,343

Languages
  - Official: Kannada
- Time zone: UTC+5:30 (IST)
- PIN: 584122
- Telephone code: 08537
- Vehicle registration: KA-36

Buddinni (pronounced "bhu-dhi-nni") is a village in the Raichur District of the Indian state of Karnataka.

== Location ==
Buddinni lies off the Maski-Lingsugur main Road (Karnataka-SH-19) and is situated between the town of Maski on the East and the town of Lingsugur on the West.

== Heritage and History ==
Shiroor Math is one of the eight original Udupi Maths (Ashta-Maths) established by Saint Madwacharya. In 1796 AD, (Shaka 1598 naLa-naama samvathsara), on the day of "magha-shukla-panchami," the pontiff of Shiroor Math (ಶಿರೂರು ಮಠ) at the time Lakshmi Manohara Theertha, established a separate Math exclusively for the followers of "shukla yajurvEda,"; under the aegis of the Shiroor, at a place called ‘Hunasi-Hole’ (pronounced hunasee hoLay; ಹುಣಸೀ ಹೊಳೆ); the Shiroor pontiff ordained a devotee and a scholar by name Venkateshacharya and installed him as the pontiff for the new Math under the name "Maadhava Theertha." Hunasi-Hole’ is in today's Kalburgi district (Gulbarga district) – Surapura Taluk, and continues to be a center for Kanva school of thought and philosophy.

The main deity at the above Kanva Math is "the thaandava vittala krishna" as also "Gopalakrishna" in consort with Rukmini and Satyabhama.

The Brindavana of the Maadhava Theertha, was constructed in the village Buddinni in AD 1810, since at the time, it is said that the Maadhava Theertha was persecuted and had sought refuge at Buddinni.

The above Madhwa Kanva Math follows Dwaita Siddhanta and Madhwa philosophy under the Dvaita system, with the Sampradayas' of the Madhwacharaya-Tradition.

The saint-sage Madhava Theertha is said to appear in the form of "Sesha-Swarupa" (or in the sacred serpentine form) in the dreams of devotees who are blessed; very rarely does the sage appear in dreams in a human form. It is said that the sage once appeared in a human form to a Muslim youth and blessed him; the youth converted as a Hindu, and became a devotee of the Madhava Theertha, and was well-known later as "RamaDas" (see the picture below).

The main celebrations of the math using the Hindu calendar are: Yagnavalkya Jayanthi, Chaitra Shudha Chaturthi, and Sri Madhwa Jayanthi. At the time of establishment, the Hunasi-Hole Math was meant to be a primary center for research and studentship, and learning of the Dvaita philosophy under the shukla yajurveda -system.

At the site of the Buddinni Brindavana and the co-located Hanuman Deity, there have been renovations and improvements recently, because of the efforts of volunteers from the surrounding villages, and donations from the area residents, and devotee-families. The place has also been renovated, guest rooms have been constructed by philanthropic contribution of sri Karichedu Joshi Sreenivasacharya, Bellary. The Hanuman idol was reinstated which in the vyasa pratishta style, with mudra on the body and bell on the tail, which was specially carved at ananthashayanagudi, Hampi, which was reinstated by Dr. Karichedu Joshi Hanumanthachar son of late sri Karichedu joshi sreenivasachar in the memory of his late father. Because of the efforts of the local volunteer-committee, led by Mr. Raghavendra Rao Alabanur, the Math is transforming into a pilgrimage and a religious center which the Brindavana and the Hanuman Temple richly deserve to be.Thousands of shukla yajurvedis worship the brindavana and the hanuman. An aradhane (yearly function)is conducted in the month of April every year. Thousands of devotees participate in the function.Due to efforts of the present swamiji Sri. VidhyaBhaskara Theertha, buddinni has become an important center of pilgrimage.

== Gallery ==
The Buddinni Brindavana and Temple Rear view

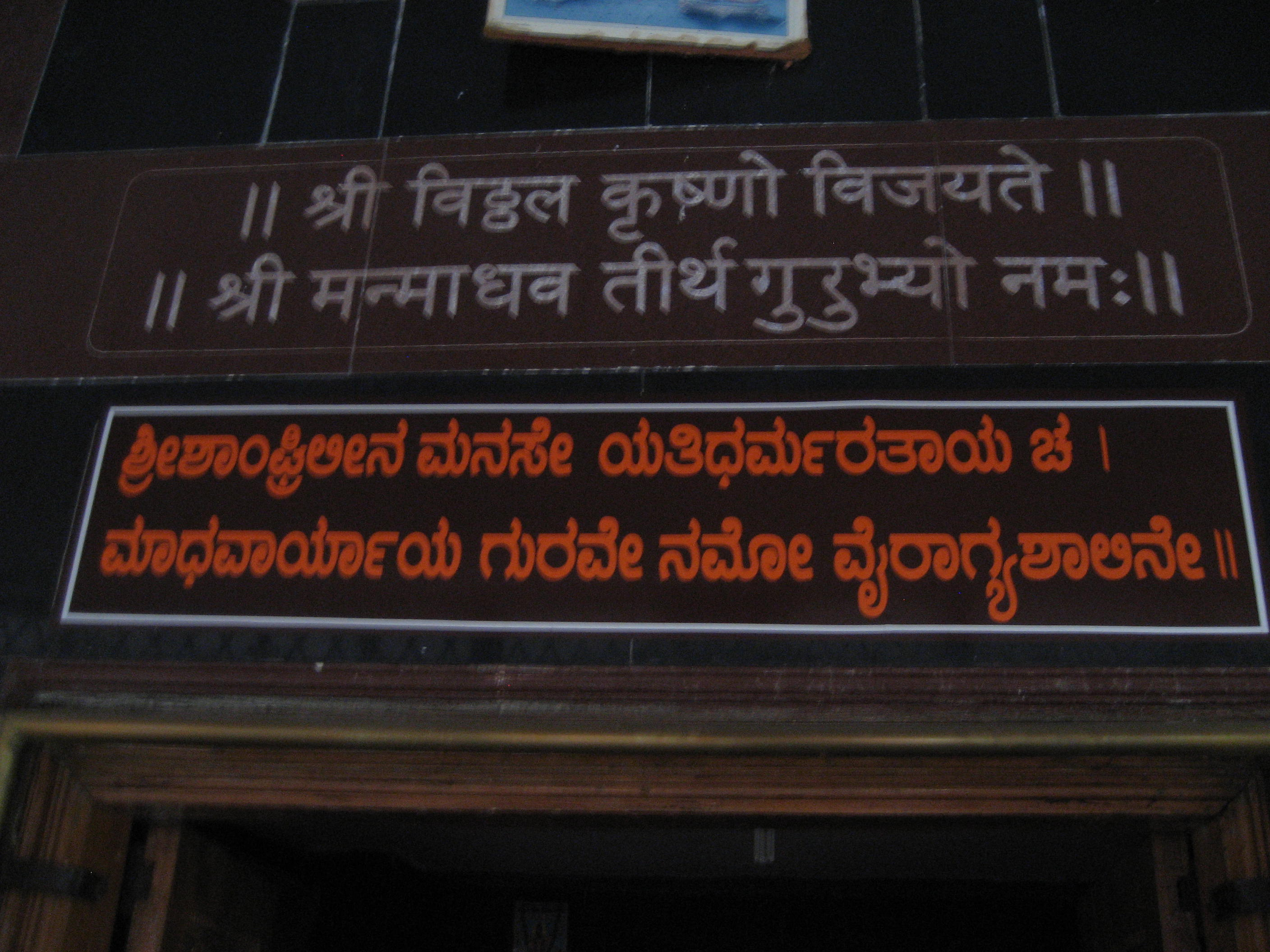
An Aphorism displayed at the Brindavana

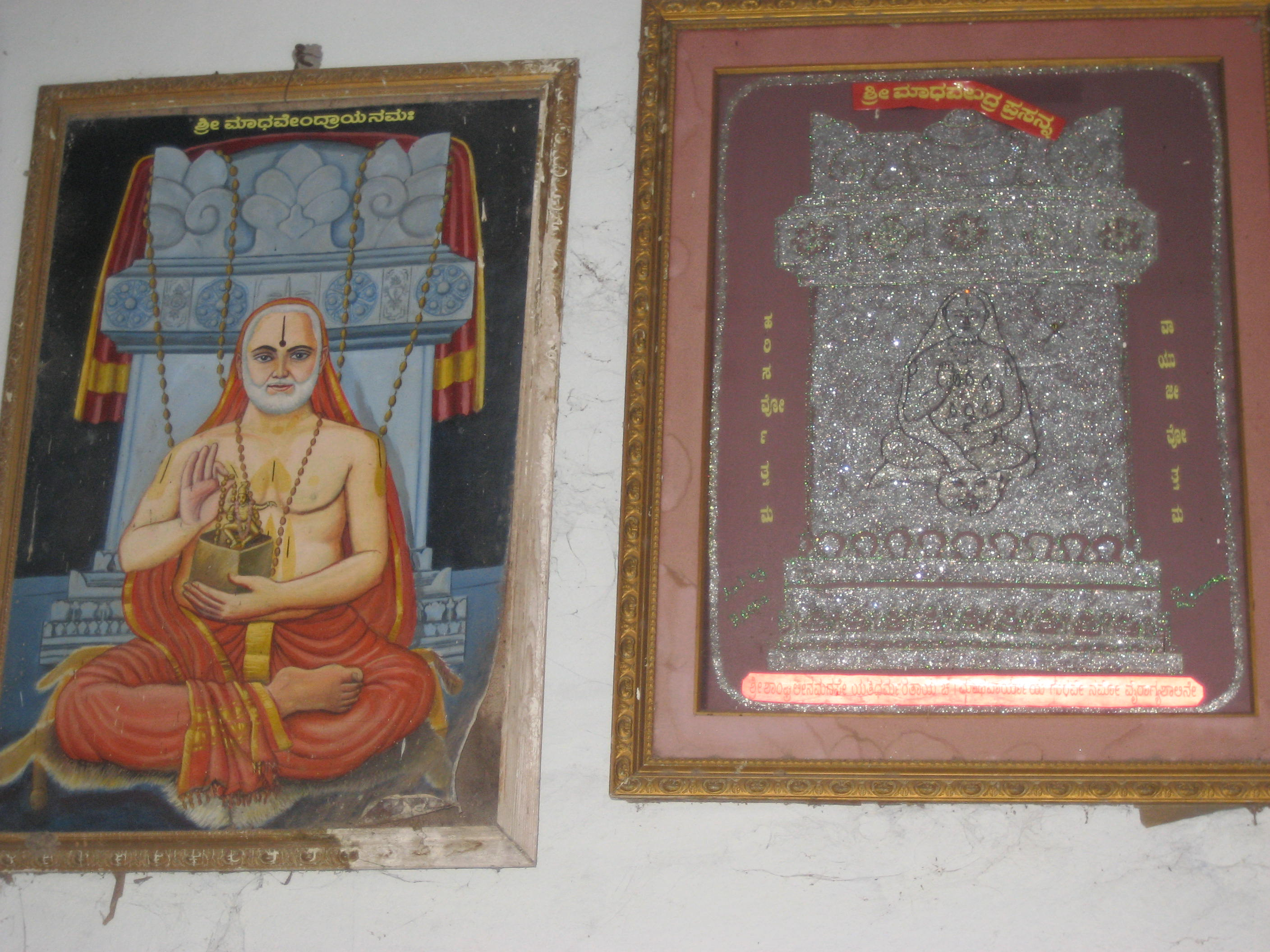
Artwork by Disciples

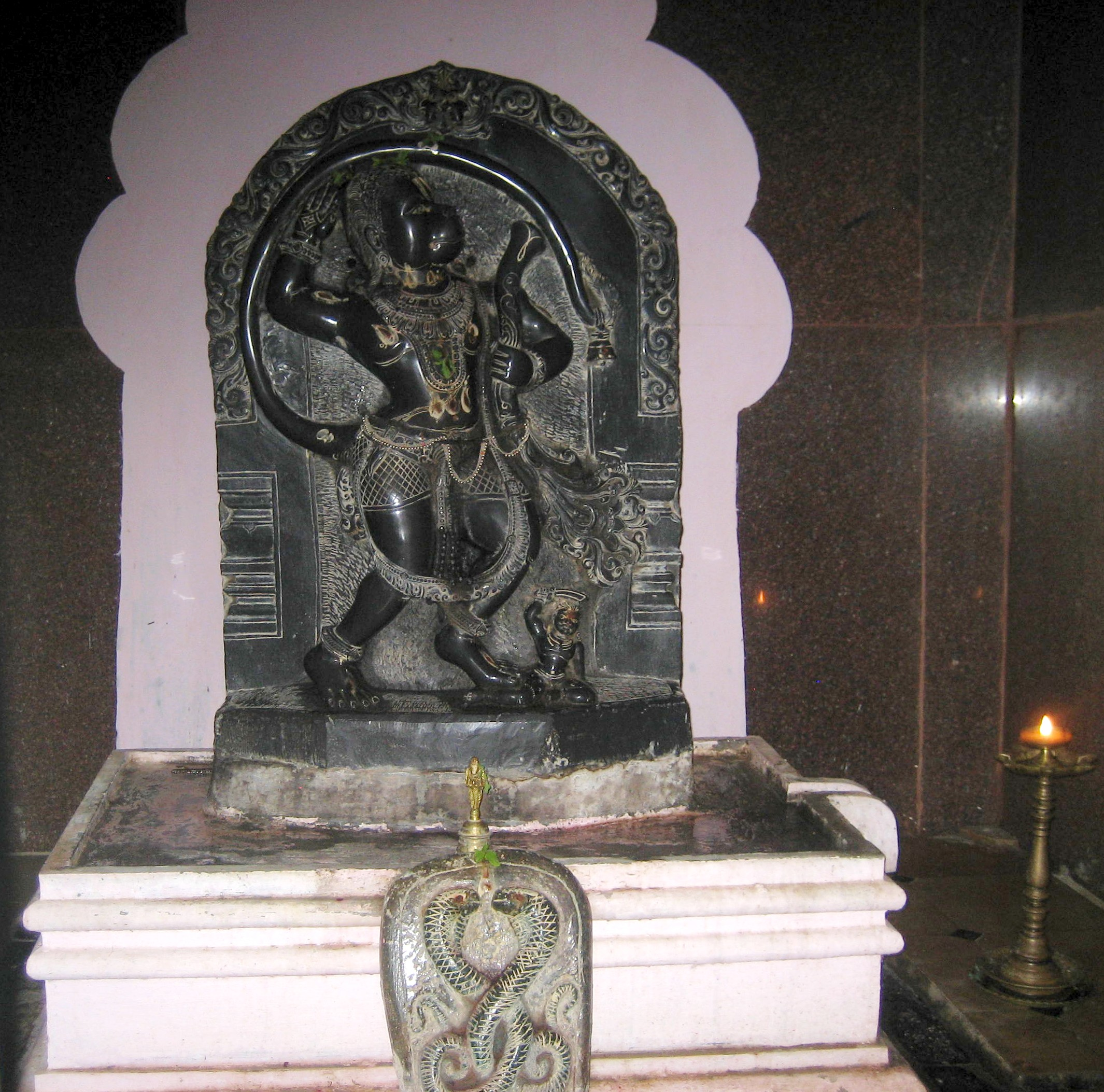
Hanuman Deity in the Temple Premises (recarved)Donated by Karichedu Joshi sreenivasachar, Bellary

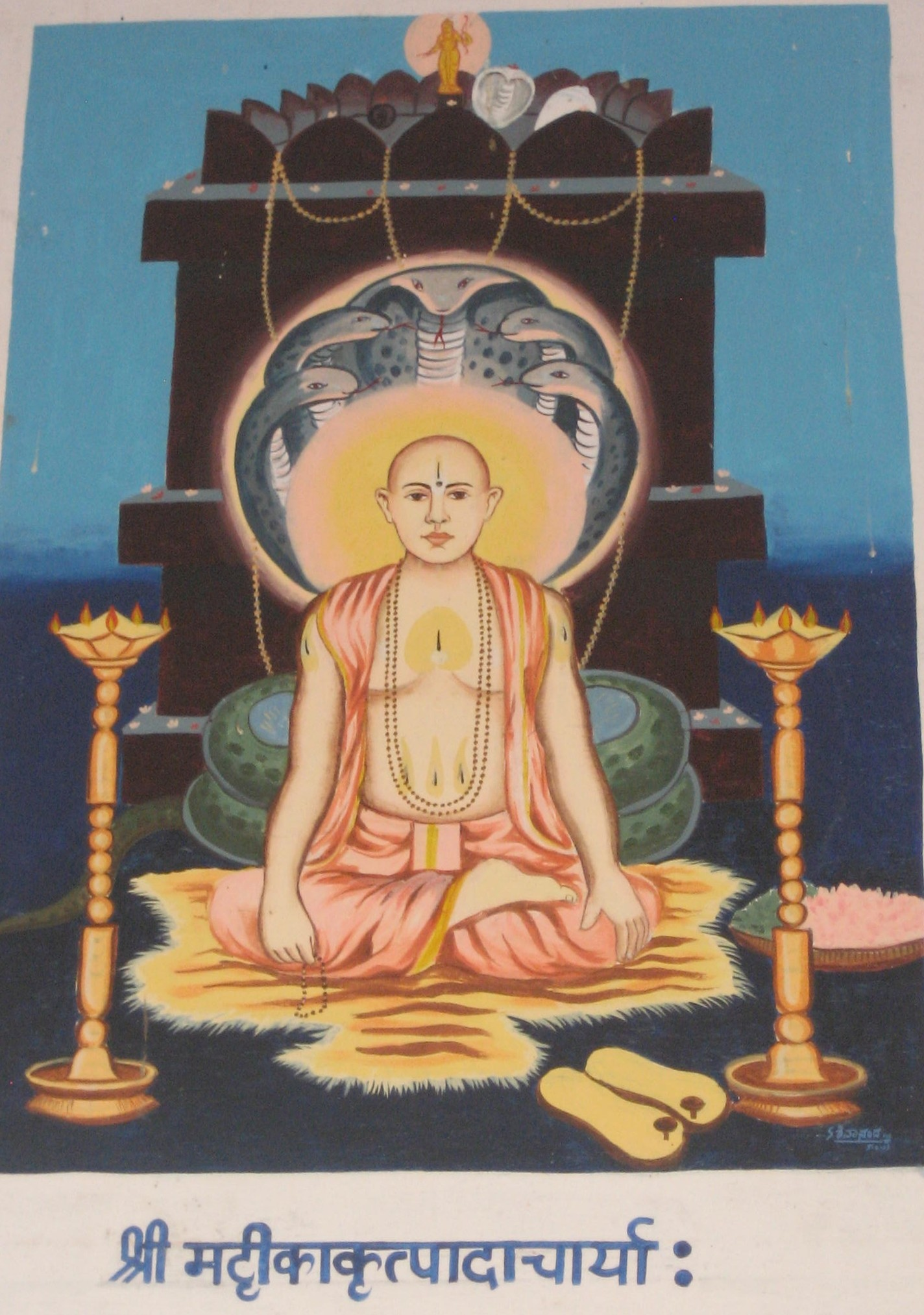
Jayatheertha, Shreemat Teekakrutpaadaru; the saint commentator of Saint Madwacharya's works.jpg

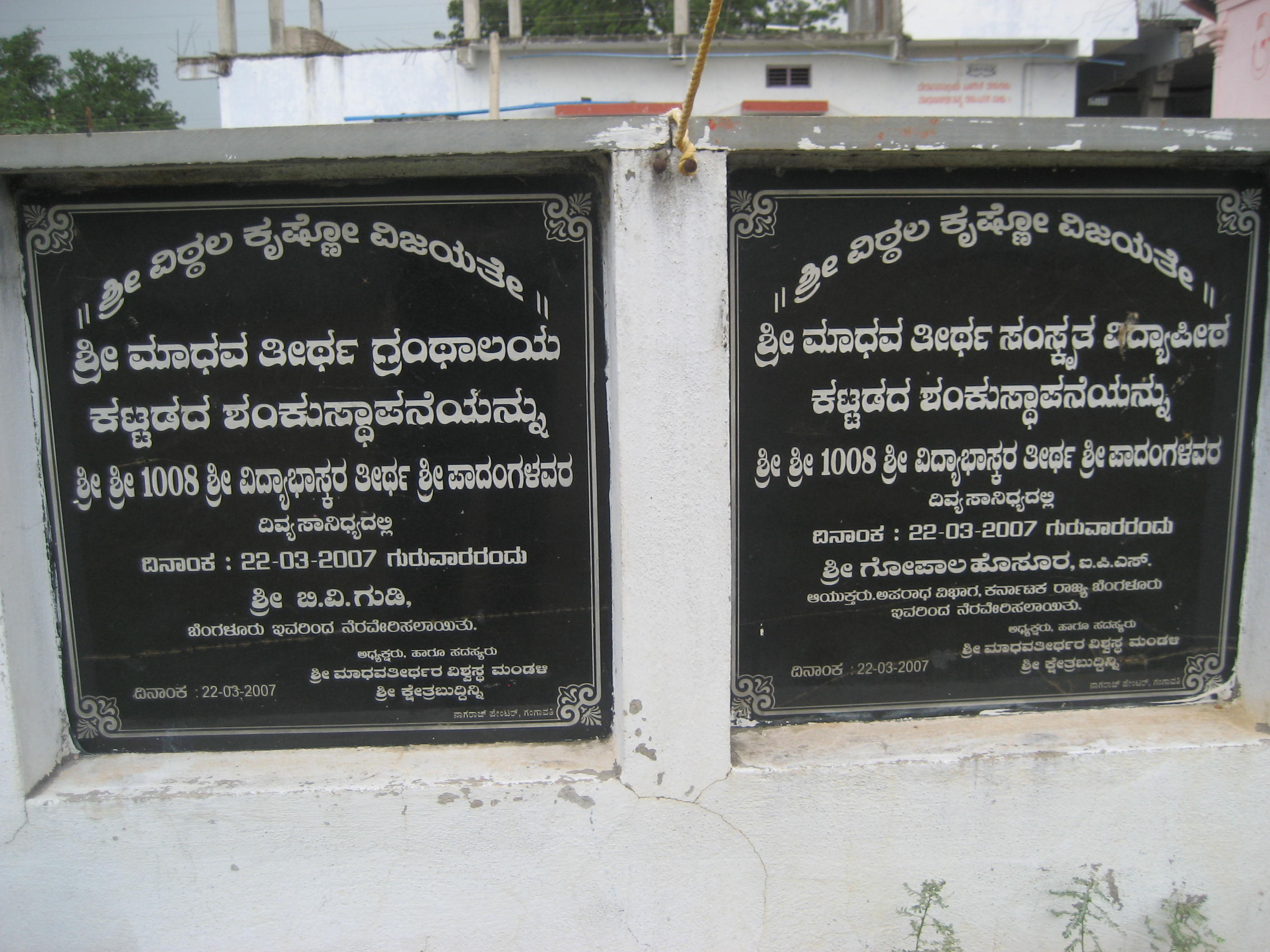
Foundation Stone for a Library at the Temple premises

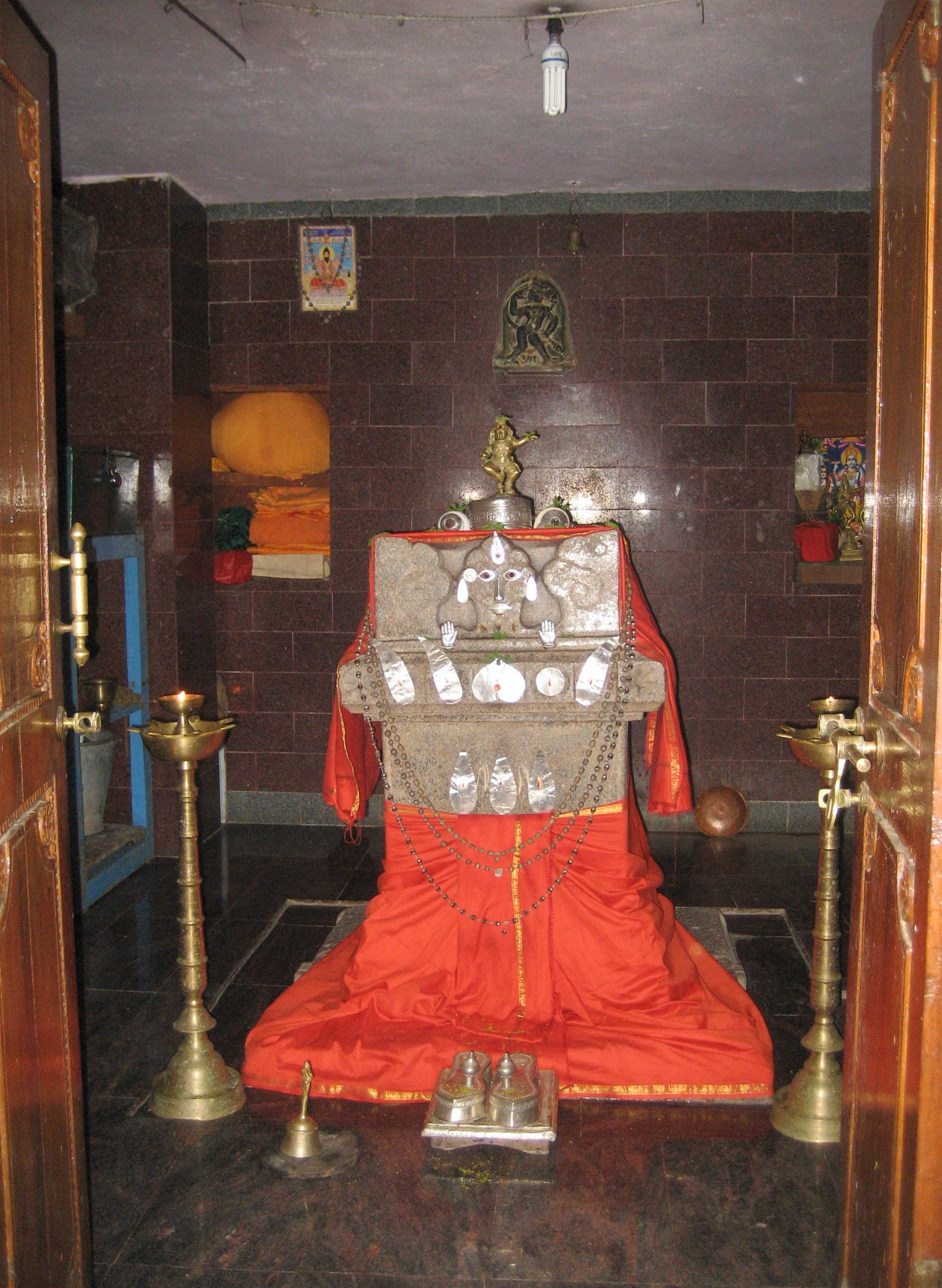
The Brindavana- sanctum-sanctorum

RamaDas of Buddinni

Jagadguru Sri Madhwacharya

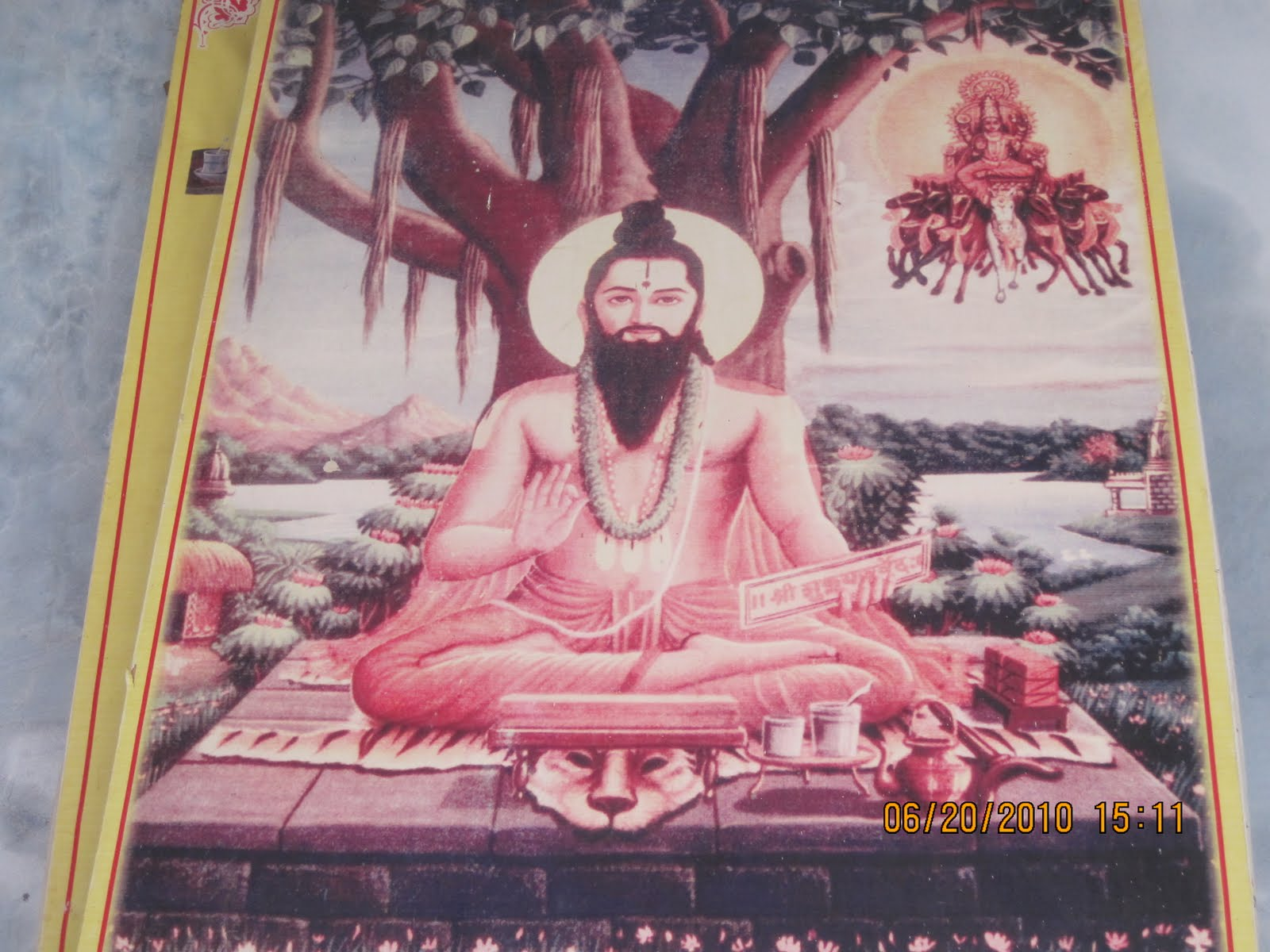
Imagery of Sage Yagnavalkya at Buddinni

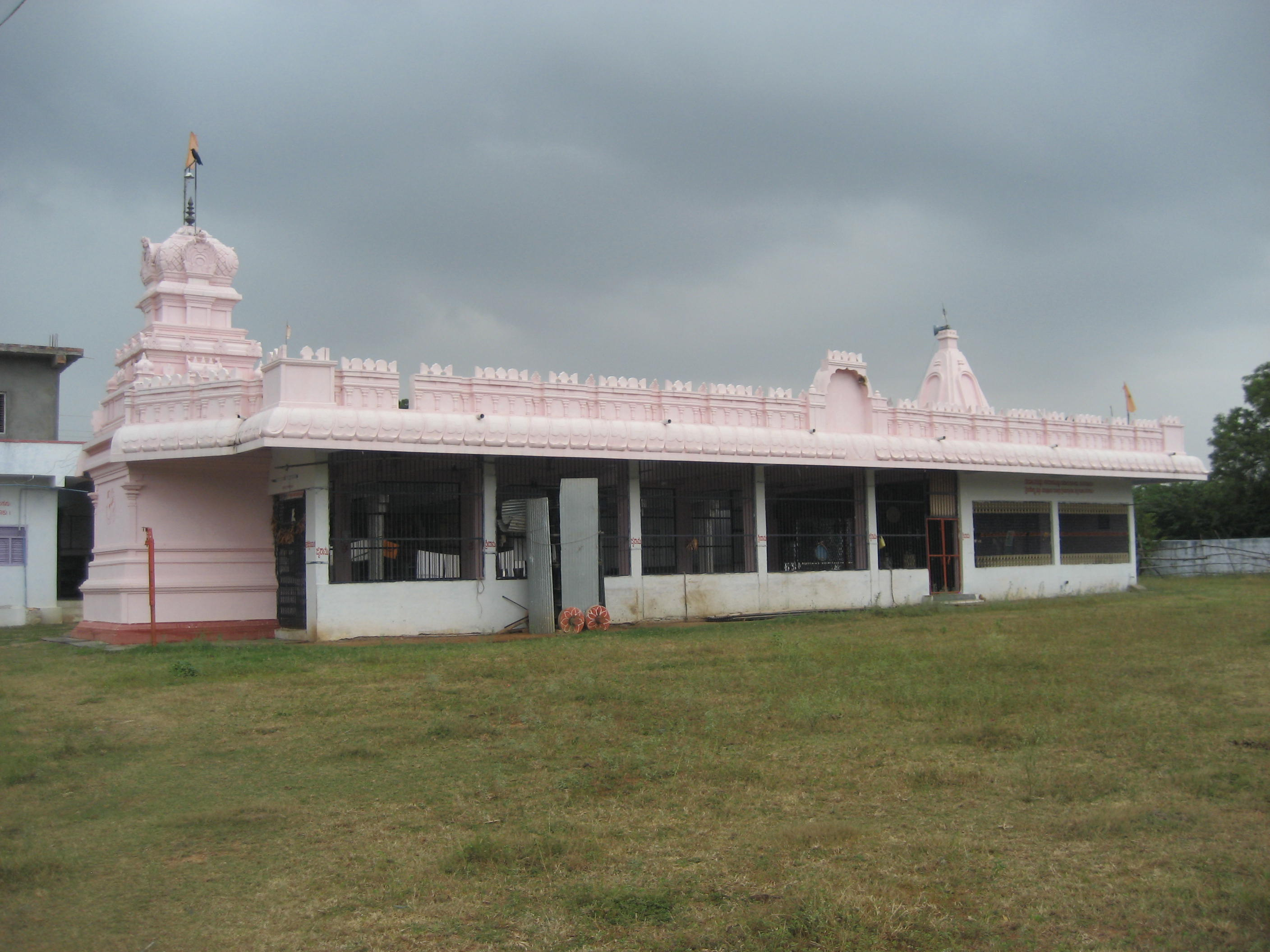
The Buddinni Brindavana and Hanuman Deity temple

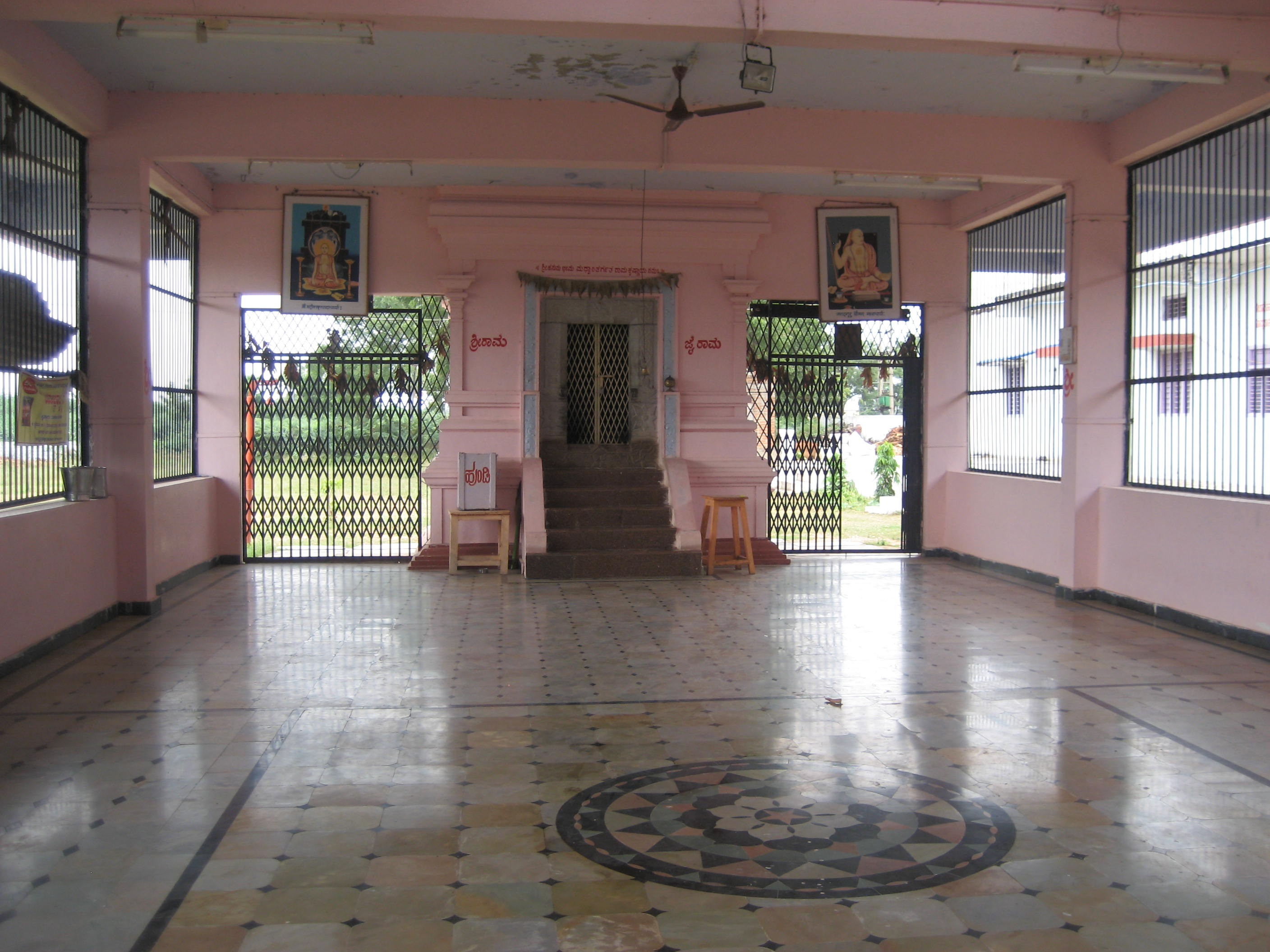
View facing the Sanctum of Hanuman Deity

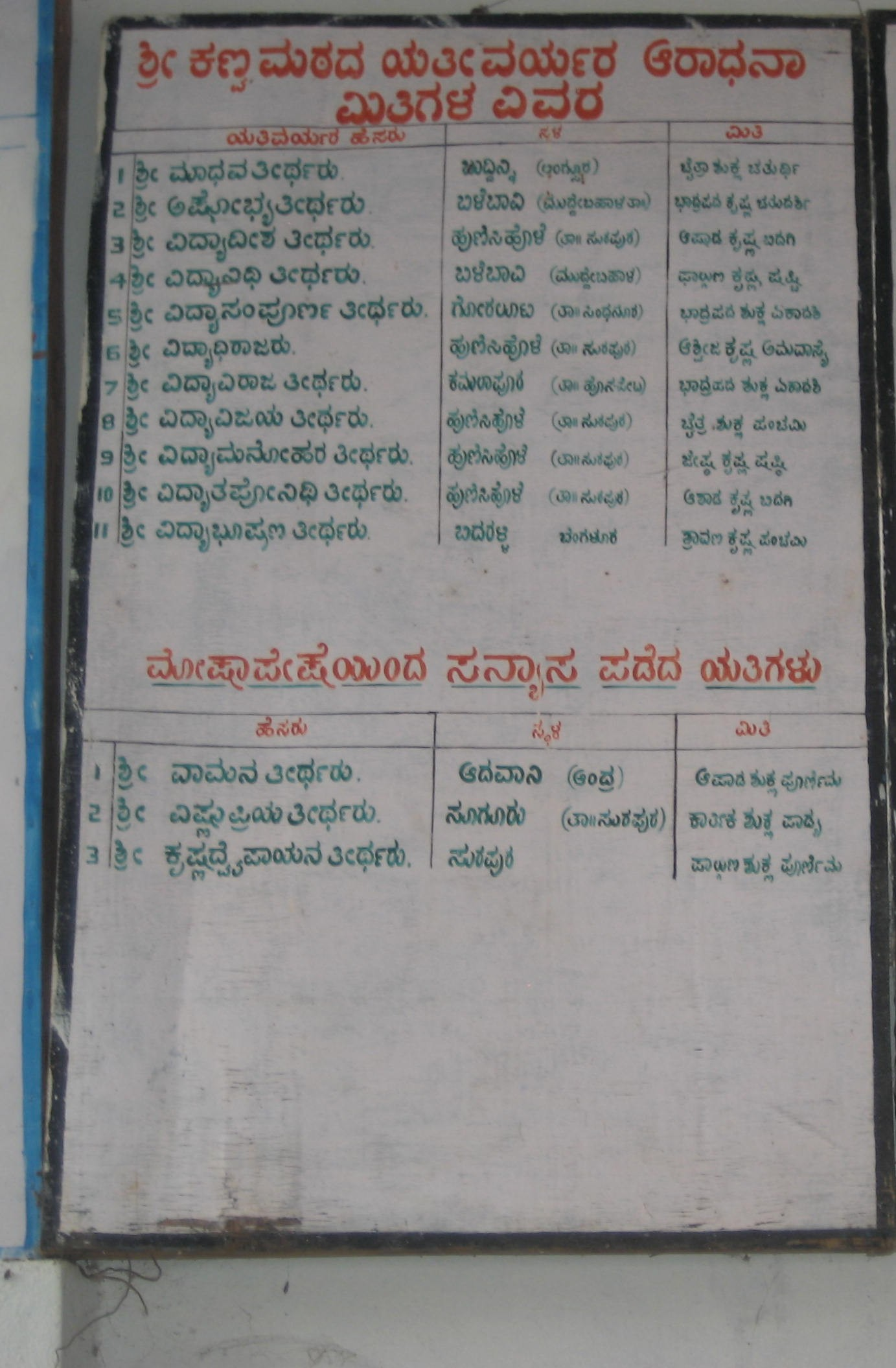
The lineage of various Pontiffs of the Hunasi Hole Math

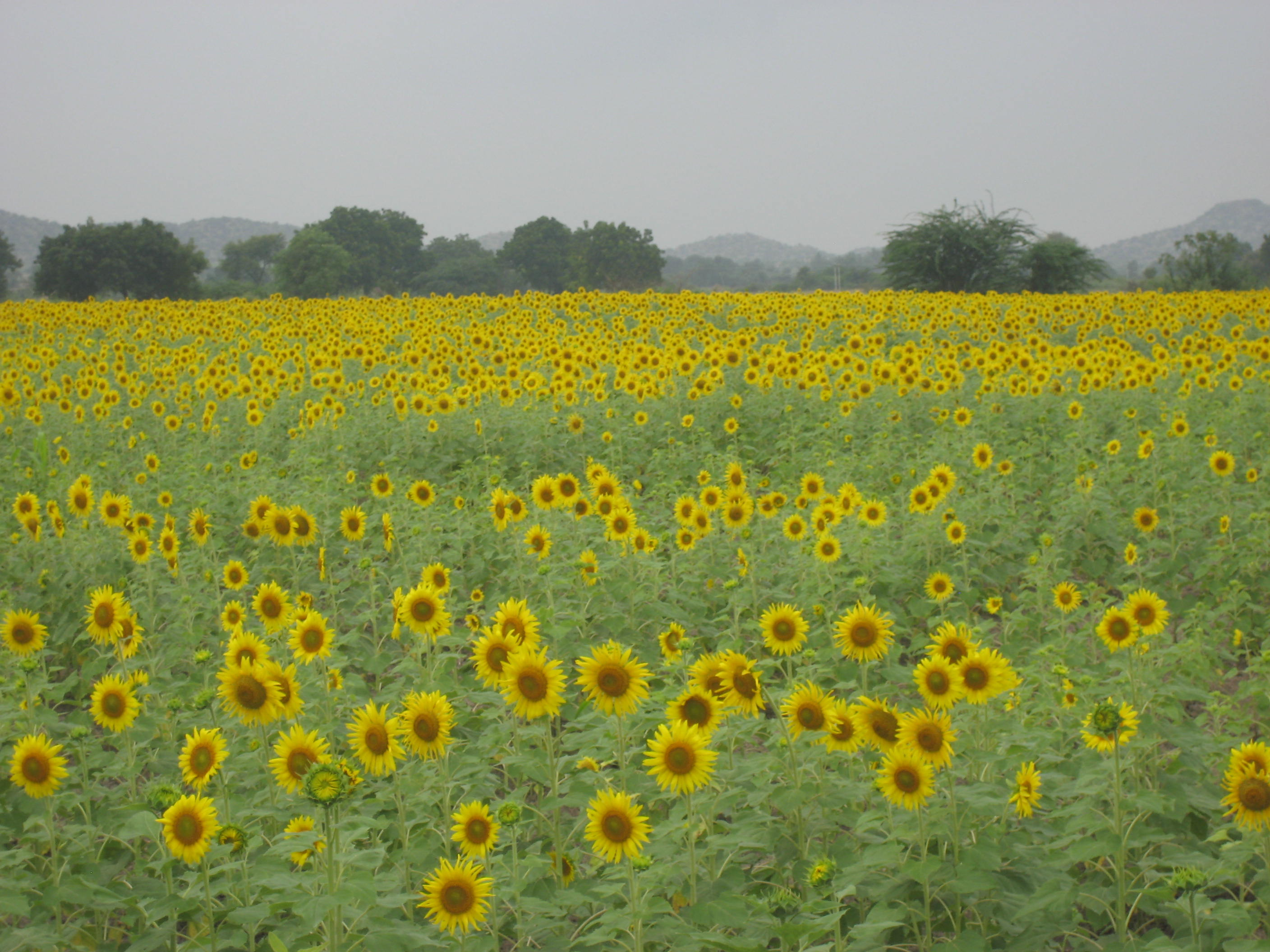
Sunflower fields near Buddinni

== See also ==
- Shukla Yajurveda
- Yagnavalkya
