= R. Gopalakrishnan Nair =

Indian politician (born 1931)

Member of the Kerala Legislative Assembly
- In office 1967–1970
- Constituency: Neyyattinkara

Personal details
- Born: March 1931

R. Gopalakrishnan Nair (born March 1931) is an Indian politician. He represented Neyyattinkara in the third Kerala Legislative Assembly. He was a member of Congress and held various positions before getting elected into the Kerala legislative assembly in 1965. Gopalakrishnan started his political career by becoming the president of the students congress. He was a member of Kerala University Union and Neyyattinkara Agricultural Land Development Bank. He also served as the chairman of Trivandrum District Co-operative Bank.
