= Omana and Moscow Gopalakrishnan =

Indian translator

Omana
- Omana with her son Sashi Nayar
- Born: Omana; 26 April 1936; Ettumanoor
- Died: 22 April 2003 (aged 66); Trivandrum
- Occupation: Translator

Moscow Gopalakrishnan (K. Gopalakrishnan Nayar)
- K Gopalakrishnan at Russian Cultural Centre in 2010
- Born: K Gopalakrishnan Nayar; 29 November 1930; Alwaye, Ernakulam district
- Died: 21 February 2011 (aged 80); Trivandrum
- Occupation: Translator

Omana (Bharathi Amma) (1936–2003) and "Moscow" Gopalakrishnan (K. Gopalakrishnan Nayar ) (1930–2011) were an Indian husband and wife duo noted for their translations of Russian books into Malayalam language. These translations are sometimes regarded as the best example of children's literature in Malayalam published in the later half of the 20th century. The couple, introducing Russian literature to Kerala, translated nearly 200 books into Malayalam with simple prose and diction.

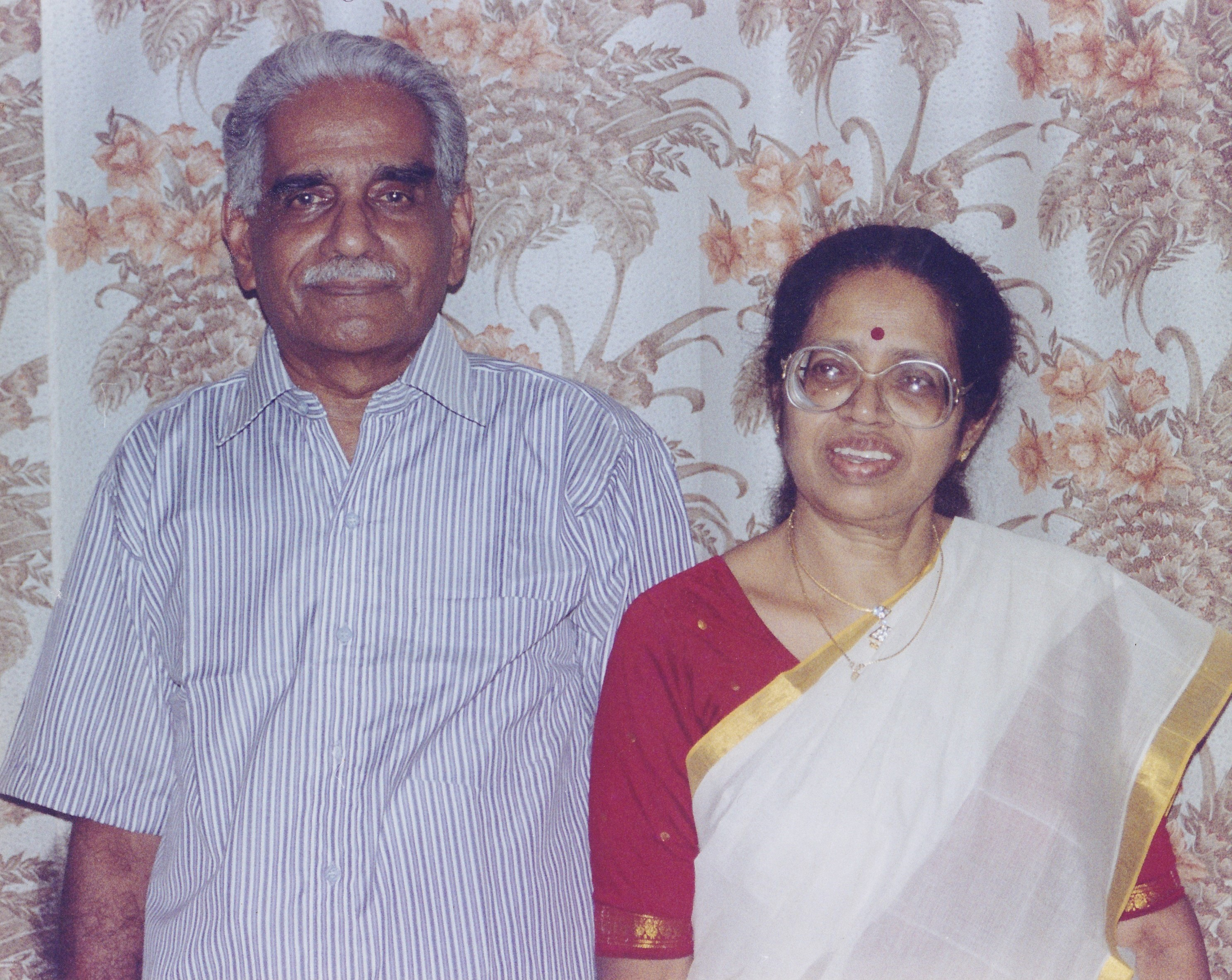
Gopalakrishnan and Omana

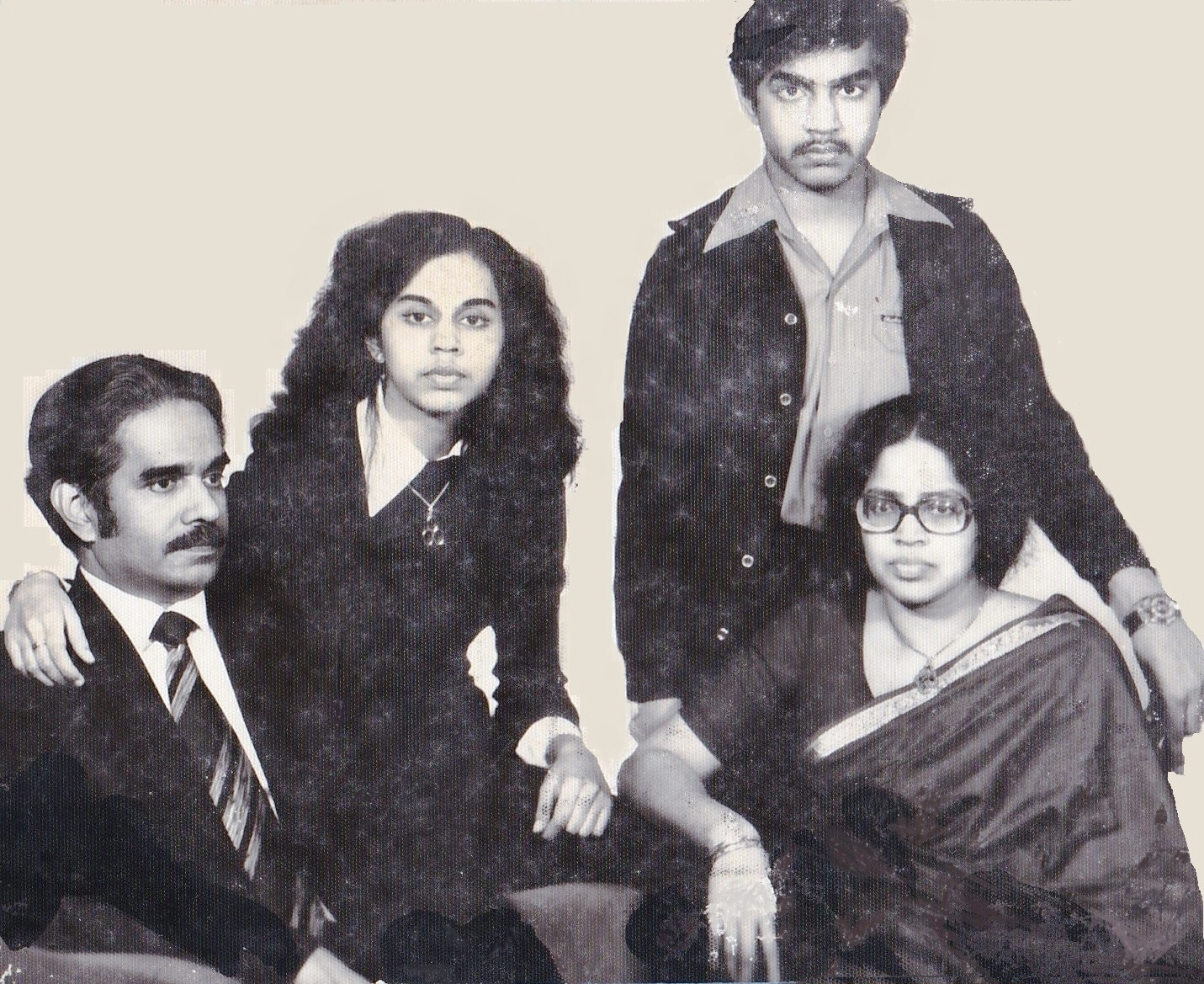
Gopalakrishnan, Omana, Latha and Sashi

Both Omana and K Gopalakrishnan were employees of Soviet Information Centre in New Delhi. K Gopalakrishnan, a native of Alwaye, was a member of the Communist Party of India in the late 1950s. He was active in local elections and was the secretary of the local taluk committee for a short period. He was the editor of SF Magazine. He joined USSR News and Views at the Soviet Information Centre. Gopalakrishnan eventually became the joint editor of the Soviet Review digest at the USSR Information Department.

In 1966, the Soviet government decided to publish Russian writings in Malayalam and the couple was invited to Progress Printers in Moscow for a two-year project. A Malayalam division was being set up and Progress Publishers needed skilled people to translate Russian works into Malayalam. With their two children, they arrived at Moscow (1966) and started by translating Russian works that had been translated into English. The first of the Russian works translated by the couple were rolled off at a press that was imported from England. Progress Printers was very particular about bringing out books that were attractive to children during this period. Later, the couple hired a tutor, Maria Pulyakova - "an old Bolshevik" - to gain better proficiency in Russian. Progress Publishers later set up the RADUGA division to bring out works of fiction and translations into Malayalam remained with the Omana-Gopalakrishnan team.

For 25 years, the family lived in Moscow and translated a huge amount of Russian literature to Malayalam which included fiction, folk tales, communist classics and propaganda materials. The couple returned to India in 1991. Till his death, K Gopalakrishnan received a pension from the Russian government for his efforts. Omana died in 2003 and K. Gopalakrishnan died in February, 2011 in Thiruvananthapuram. They have one daughter and one son. Daughter Dr. Latha Bimal is a gynaecologist based in Dubai and son Sashi Nayar settled in Moscow.

== Translations ==
The Russian books translated by Omana and Gopalakrishnan were published in Malayalam by Prabhath Book House.

=== K Gopalakrishnan ===
"The magic of these translations - done directly from Russian into Malayalam - was such that young readers were effortlessly lifted to a new landscape and made to feel that the human drama unfolding in an unfamiliar geography happened in their own backyard."

— Amrith Lal, The Economic Times (Mar 10, 2011) .

K Gopalakrishnan translated around 80 works to Malayalam which included 62 works by Karl Marx, Friedrich Engels and Vladimir Lenin, 25 political works, four works on science, 19 books on fiction and 26 children’s works. That include,

- The Mother by Maxim Gorky
- The Autobiography of Maxim Gorky
- Resurrection by Leo Tolstoy
- White Nights by Fyodor Dostoyevsky
- Books of Anton Chekhov

=== Omana Gopalakrishnan ===
Omana Gopalakrishnan translated 40 children’s books and 16 other works of fictions. That include,

- The Ant and the Cosmonaut
- The White Deer
- Anna Karenina by Leo Tolstoy (not published, "It was her major translation. We were in Moscow at the time. She had handed over her work to her editor, a Russian lady. But then, USSR fell. Progress Publishers, which used to publish the works, closed down. We also returned to India in 1991", says K Gopalakrishnan. Later, during a visit to Moscow after the death of Omana, Gopalakrishnan looked up the editor. "She searched for the manuscript. But she told me that it was burnt".)
