= Suresh Gopalakrishnan =

American electrical engineer

Suresh Gopalakrishnan from the General Motors Inc., Farmington Hills, MI was named Fellow of the Institute of Electrical and Electronics Engineers (IEEE) in 2012 for contributions to electric drives and control for automotive systems.
