= R. Gopalakrishnan =

Indian businessman and author (born 1945)

Ramabadran Gopalakrishnan
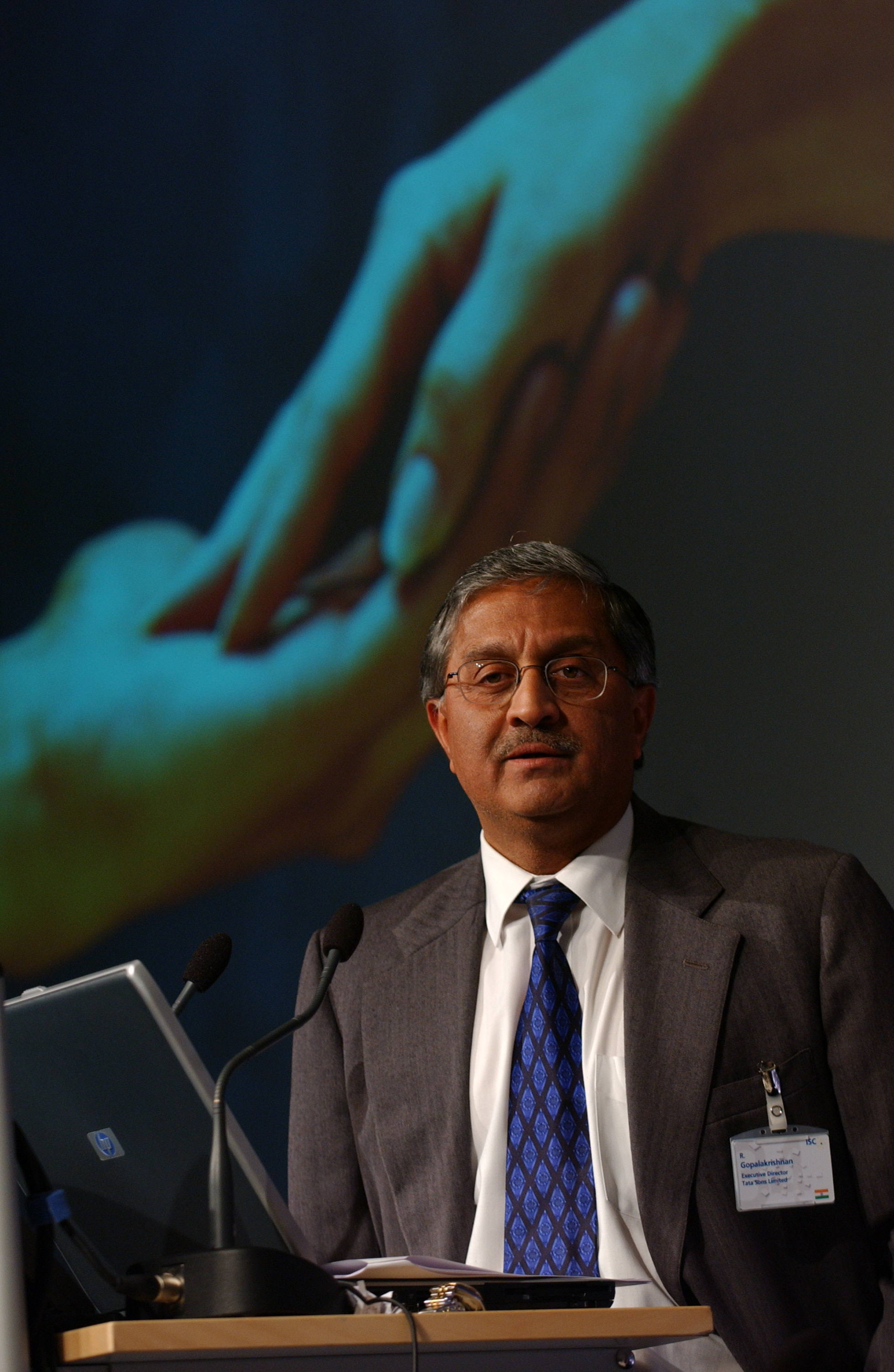
- Born: 25 December 1945 (age 80); India
- Education: St. Xavier's College, Calcutta University; IIT Kharagpur; Harvard Business School
- Occupations: Business executive, author
- Known for: Former Executive Director of Tata Sons; Former Vice Chairman of Hindustan Lever
- Board member of: Tata Power, Tata Technologies, AkzoNobel India, Castrol India, ABP Pvt. Ltd.
- Children: 3

Ramabadran Gopalakrishnan (born 25 December 1945) is an Indian businessman and author. Until his retirement he was an executive director of Tata Sons Ltd and served on the boards of Tata Power, Tata Technologies, AkzoNobel India, Castrol India and ABP Pvt. Ltd. Before joining Tata, he was Vice Chairman of Hindustan Lever, the Indian subsidiary of Unilever plc.

Gopalakrishnan earned a bachelor's degree in physics from St Xavier's College, Calcutta University, a bachelor's degree in Electronics from IIT Kharagpur in 1967 and did a six-week Advanced Management Programme from Harvard Business School, United States.

He has lived and worked in India, the UK and Saudi Arabia. He began his career in 1967 as a computer analyst with Hindustan Lever. He worked in the marketing function before moving to general management. During his years with Unilever, he was based in Jeddah as CEO of the Arabia unit; later, he was managing director of Brooke Bond Lipton India and then vice-chairman with Hindustan Lever. He has been president of the All India Management Association. He is married and has three children.

== Publications ==
- Gopalakrishnan, R (2009). The case of the bonsai manager : lessons from nature on growing. Penguin, Portfolio. ISBN 9780670081318.
- — (2011). When the penny drops : learning what's not taught. Portfolio Penguin. ISBN 9780670082964.
- — (2013). A comma in a sentence : extraordinary change in an ordinary family over six generations. Rupa Publications India. ISBN 978-8129129772.
- — (2015). What the CEO Really Wants From You: The 4 As for Managerial Success. HarperCollins India. ISBN 978-9351365211.
- — (2015). Six lenses : vignettes of success, career and relationships. Rupa Publications India. ISBN 978-8129135872.
- — (2017). A biography of innovations : from birth to maturity. India: Penguin. ISBN 978-0670089895.
- —; Banerjee, Ranjan (2018). The made-in-India manager. Hachette India. ISBN 978-9351952510.
- — (2019). Crash : lessons from the entry and exit of CEOs. India: Penguin. ISBN 978-0670090778.
