= Castrol India =

Automotive and lubricant manufacturer

- Type: Subsidiary
- Traded as: BSE: 500870; NSE: CASTROLIND
- Industry: Oil and Gas
- Founded: 1910; 116 years ago
- Headquarters: Mumbai, Maharashtra, India
- Key people: Mr. Saugata Basuray (Managing Director)
- Products: Oil; Petroleum; Petrochemical; Lubricant
- Revenue: ₹23,543 million (US$250 million)
- Owner: BP (50.9%)
- Parent: Castrol
- Website: castrol.com/india

Castrol India Limited is an automotive and industrial lubricant manufacturing company. Castrol India is the 2nd largest manufacturer of automotive and industrial lubricants in the Indian lubricant market and owns around 20% market share in the overall Indian lubricant market. It is part of Castrol Limited UK (part of BP Group). It has 5 manufacturing plants that are networked with 400+ distributors, serving over 70,000 retail outlets.

== History ==
In 1910, Castrol India started importing certain automotive lubricants from C C Wakefield & Company, making an entry in the Indian market. In 1979, CIL was incorporated under the name of Indrol Lubricants and Specialities Pvt Ltd. It was listed on BSE in 1982, and CIL was converted into a public limited company. CIL had formed a subsidiary Company in the year 1987 under the name of Indtech Speciality Chemicals, Ltd.

On 1 November 1990, the name of the company was changed from Indrol Lubricants & Specialities Ltd. to Castrol India Ltd. It helped to manufacture telephone cable jellies, pharmaceutical jellies, and industrial waxes in technical collaboration with Dussek Campbell, U.K.

As of December 2019, there were talks ongoing between Reliance Industries and BP for setting up fuel stations in India where Castrol's products will be sold.

== Products ==
Corrosion preventives, lubricants, metalworking fluids, high temperature grease, cutting oil, automotive oil, neat cutting oil], cleaners

- Oils - Cylinder oils-crosshead, crankcase oils-crosshead, truck piston engine oils, hydraulic oils, gear oils, compressor oils, turbine oils, refrigeration oils, emulsifiable oils, multi-grades, heat transfer oils, greases, and fishing
