= List of state highways in Karnataka =

The state highways are arterial routes of a state, linking district headquarters and important towns within the state and connecting them with national highways or highways of the neighboring states.

== Introduction ==
There are 14 national highways and 151 state highways in Karnataka.

== List of state highways in Karnataka ==
State Highway	Route	Passes through - District(s)	Total length (Km)
KA SH 1	Padubidri - Karkala - Agumbe - Thirthahalli - Ripponpet - Anandapura - Siralkoppa - Hangal Tadas - Kalghatgi - Dharwad - Belawadi - Bailahongal - Murgod - Chikalgud	Udupi, Shimoga, Haveri, Dharwad, Belgaum	457
KA SH 2 Haveri - Mylara - Harapanahalli - Kudligi - Molakalmuru	, Haveri, Vijayanagara, Chitradurga	180	
KA SH 3	Muttatti - Sathanur - Ramanagara - Magadi - Solur - Sompura - Dabaspete-Koratagere - Madugiri: Pavagada- Chikkahalli	Ramanagara, Tumkur, Bangalore Rural	249
KA SH 4	Kamalanagar - Halburga - Bidar- Gunalli	Bidar	69
KA SH 5	Bangarapet - Kolar - Chintamani- Bagepalli	Kolar, Chikkaballapur	106
KA SH 6	Karwar - Kaiga - Yellapura - Mundgod - Bankapura - Savanur - Gadag - Gajendragarh - Hanumasagara - Ilkal	Uttara Kannada, Haveri, Gadag, Bagalkot	332
KA SH 7	Srirangapatna - Pandavapura - K.R Pet - Channarayapatna - Arasikere	Mandya, Hassan	108
KA SH 8	Hirisave - Shravanabelagola - Channarayapatna - Holenarasipura - Arkalgud- Sanivarasanthe - Chengadahalli - Vanaguru - Kundali - Shanthalli - Thaltarshettahalli - Thakere - Beligere - Kumburu - Suntekoppa- Chattalli	Hassan	170
KA SH 9	Yelahanka - Doddaballapura -Thondebhavi - Gowribidanur- Kudumalakunte	Bengaluru Urban, Bangalore Rural, Chikballapur	74
KA SH 10	Sarasamba - Aland- Gulbarga - Sedam- Ribbonapalli	Kalaburagi	147
KA SH 11	Hulasur - Balakunda - Basavakalyana - Mudubi - Mahagao	Bidar, Kalaburagi	64
KA SH 13	Devasugur - Raichur - Katagodu	Raichur	52
KA SH 14	Ramdurg - Badami - Pattadakal - Hulgund Kodihal - Karadi - Mudagal - Maski - Basapura - Pothanal - Chikalaparvi- Manvi	Belgaum, Bagalkot, Raichur	212
KA SH 15	Wanamarapalli - Aurad - Santhapur - Bidar - Mannaekhelli - Chincholi - Sedam - Yadagir - KhanapuraHathiguduru - DhabhaDevdurg - GabburuRaichur	Bidar, Kalaburagi, Yadgir, Raichur	290
KA SH 16	Sindagi Gogi - mall a YankanchiSahapur - Kanapur - Yadagiri - Gurmatkal - Kodangal	Yadgir	152
KA SH 17	Bangalore - Ramanagara - Channapattana - Maddur - Mandya - Srirangapatna - Mysore	Bengaluru Urban,Bengaluru South (Ramanagara), Mandya, Mysore	144
KA SH 18	Mudhol - Chikkodi - Nippani	Bagalkot, Belagavi	111
KA SH 19	Srirangapatna - Nagamangala-Bellur Cross-Mayasandra-Turuvekere-K.B.Cross-Chikkanayakanahalli-Huliyar - Hiriyur - Chellakere - Bellary-Sindhigeri- Siruguppa - Sindhanur - Lingasugur - Surpur - Sahapur (including Gulbarga City limits)-- Jeevargi	Mandya, Tumkur, Chitradurga, Bellary, Raichur, Yadgir, Kalaburagi	611
KA SH 20	Raichur - Lingasugur - Hungund - Nandawadagi - Bagalkot - Lokapur - Yeraghatti - Belgaum - Bachi	Raichur,	354
KA SH 21	Halebidu - Hassan - Arakalgudu - Periyapatna- Anechukur	Hassan	124
KA SH 22	Gulbarga - Afzalpur - Hosur	Kalaburgi	100
KA SH 23	Kalmal - Manvi - Sindhanur - Gangavathi - Ginigera - Koppal - Mundaragi - Laxmeshwar: Gudigere - Shiggaon	Raichur, Koppal, Gadag, Haveri	350
KA SH 24	Tarikere - Hosadurga - V. V Pura - Hiriyur - Dharmapura		137
KA SH 25	Hospet - Mariammanahalli - Harapanahalli - Harihara - - Shimoga	Vijayanagara, Davangere, Shimoga	181
KA SH 26	Halageri - Honnali - Ayanur - Arasalu - Hosanagar - Hulikal		190
KA SH 27	Virajpet - Madikeri - Somavarpete - Sakaleshpura - Mudigere - Vastare - Jayapura - Sringeri - Begar - Agumbe - Halady - Byndoor		375
KA SH 28	Supa - Haliyala - Dharwad - Hebsur - Annigeri		112
KA SH 29	Mudgal - Thavaregere - Gangavathi - Kampli - Kudithini		117
KA SH 30	Sindhanur - Kushtagi - Ron - Saundatti - Belawadi - Bekawadi - Khanapur - Hemmadaga		306
KA SH 31	Jath - Ananthapura - Athani - Gurlapura - Gokak - Nesargi - Bailahongal - Sampgaon - Chikka Bagewadi - Hire Bagewadi - Khanapura - Jamboti		245
KA SH 32	Umarga - Aland - Mahagaon - Chincholi - Sulepet		119
KA SH 33	Koratagere - Tumkur - Kunigal - Maddur - Malavalli - Mysore - H. D.Kote - Bavali	Tumkur, Mandya, Mysore	273
KA SH 34	Aurad - Balki - Basavakalyana - Aland - Afzalpur-Almela - Indi - Bijapur - Jamakhandi - Mudhol - Lokapur - Ramdurg - Saundatti - Dharwad Ramnagar - Supa (Joida) - Anashi - Sadashivagad	Bidar, Kalaburagi, Vijayapura, Bagalkot, Belagavi, Uttara Kannada	666
KA SH 35	Sidlaghatta - Hoskote - Kadugodi - Anekal	Chikkaballapur, Bangalore rural, Bangalore Urban	89
KA SH 36	Koppal - Bevur - Kushtagi - Kyadhiguppa		70
KA SH 37	Subramanya - Dharmasthala - Belthangadi - Karkala - Udupi		132
KA SH 38	Kollegal - Hasanurghat		64
KA SH 39	Bangalore - Hesarghatta		13
KA SH 40	Mylara - Hadagali - Hagaribommanahalli - Kudligi- Sandur-Thoranagallu	Vijayanagara	162
KA SH.41	Shiradon - Chadchan - Zalki - Indi - Devarahipparagi - Hovinahipparagi - MuddebihalNalatwad - NarayanapuraBasava Sagara Jalashaya - Lingasugur	Vijayapura-Yadgir-Raichur	197
KA SH 42	Ankola - Munirabadh Town limits- Joladharasi in Koppal		11
KA SH 43	Tikota - Kanamadagi		23
KA SH 44	Sankeshwar - Hukeri - Ghataprabha - Kulgod - Yadawad - Lokapura - Kerakalamatti - Agasanakoppa - Guledhagudda - Kamathagi - Gulur - Sangam		198
KA SH 45	Arabhavi - Gokak - Nargund - Shalavadi - Shirahatti - Mundaragi - Hadagali - Itagi - Ujjani - Jagalur - Challakere		310
KA SH 46	Mundgodu - Kalaghatagi - Haliyala - Dandeli-Gund-Anashi		136
KA SH 47	Mandya - Melukote - Shravanabelagula - Tiptur - Huliyar - Hosadurga - Holalkere - Anagodu - Harapanahalli - Hadagali - Mundargi	Mandya, Tumkur, Chithradurga, Davanagere, Vijayanagara, Gadag	354
KA SH 48	Kumta - Siddapura - Soraba - Shikaripura - Honnali - Basavapatna - Chitradurga - Challakere - Pavagada - Kadamadagi		390
KA SH 49	Sandur - Hosapet - Kampli - Siraguppa		106
KA SH 50	Bhatkal - Jog - Mavinagundi - Siddapura - Chandragutti - Soraba		128
KA SH 51	Basavakalyan - Gulbarga - Shahabad - Ravoor - Wadi - Yadgir - Raichur		190
KA SH 52	Thirthahalli - Nagara - Balebare - Hosangadi - Siddapura - Basur - Kundapur		84
KA SH 53	Kagawad - Ugar - Kudachi - Jamakhandi - Kaladhagi		122
KA SH 54	Jambooti - Peeranawadi - Belgaum - Budhihal - Akkatangerahal - Kolavi - Mamadhapur - Davaleshwar - Mahalingapura - Rabakavi		130
KA SH 55	Yaragatti - Yadawad - Mudhol - Mantur - Amalazari - Chickkagalagali - Babaleshwar		108
KA SH 56	Bedi - Kittur - Gobbaragumpi - Alagawadi - Navalgund - Shelawadi - Belavanki		112
KA SH 57	Bagalakote - Badami - Ron - Huilgola - Gadag - Shirahatti - Guttal - Ranibennur - Masur - Sikaripura - Shimoga - Lakkavalli - Tharikere - Chikamagalur - Belur - Hassan - Holenarasipura - K R Nagar - Belikere - Nanjangud - Yalandur- Beligeriranganabetta		662
KA SH 58	Mudigere - Belur - Halebidu -Javagal - Banavara - Huliyar - Sira - Gowribidanur - Chickaballapura - Chintamani - Srinivasapura - Mulbagal - Tayalur - Venkatagirikota (The complete highway was upgraded to NH 234)		390
KA SH 59	Kustagi - Pattadhakal		52
KA SH 60	Hungund | Muddebihal-Talikote-pirapur- | Kodaganur cross - Kembavi | Kumbarpete | Surapura	Yadgir-vijayapura-bagalkote	122
KA SH 61	Managuli-Basavana Bagewadi-Hoovinahipparagi-Talikoti-Malanoor-Hunasagi-DevapurThinthni BridgeJalahalli-Devadurga Siriwara - Neermanvi - Bailmerchad - Rajolibanda - Bichal	Raichur, Yadgir, Vijayapura, Andhra Pradesh State Border	221
KA SH 62	Haveri - Lingapura - Chikerur - Hirekerur - Siralakoppa- Sagara		108
KA SH 63	Raravi - Siraguppa - Desanur - Gorebal - Karatagi - Kanakagiri - Yelaburga - Sankallur - Sudi - Rajur - Belur		165
KA SH 64	Bantwal - Kalladka - Vittal - Perla - Badiyadka - Kasaragod - Kanhangad		85
KA SH 65	Malpe - Udupi - Hebri - Agumbe - Begar - Koppa - Narasimharajapura - Sulageri - Bhadravathi - Channagiri - Shanti Sagara - Davanagere - Jagalur - Mustur - B G Kere - Molakalmur		340
KA SH 66	Gangamoola - Malleshwara - Kalasa - Magundi - Kotigehara		94
KA SH 67	Mangalore - Bajpe - Kateel - Belman - Kapu - Shirva (including Hospet Mangalore Road in Mangalore City Old NH 48 in Mangalore City Limits) - Athradi		72
KA SH 68	Tumkur - Shimoga Town Limits - Honnavar in Badravathi		12
KA SH 69	Sirsi - Mundagodu - Tadas		75.0
KA SH 70	Belthangadi - Moodabidri - Mulki		57
KA SH 71	Tiptur - Dudda (additional length of 8 km from Dairy Circle to Devarayapatna) (NH-48 in Hassan town limits) - Hassan		57
KA SH 71E	Dairy Circle - Busthenahalli(NH-48 in Hassan town limits)		2
KA SH 72	Nippani - Nanadhi - Examba - Ugar - Athani - Kothalagi		135
KA SH 73	Ugar - Kudachi - Raibag - Kabbur - Bellad Bagewadi - Ghataprabha - Konnur -Gudichinamalki - Paschapur - Akkatangerahal - Nesargi - Sampagaon - Neginahal - Nayanagar - Belawadi - Budaraghatti - Thadakoda - Mammighatti - Dharwad - Hubli - Kundagol (including Old NH 4 between Dharwad) - Hubli - Laxmeshwar		300
KA SH 74	Anekal - Harohalli - Bidadi - Thavarekere - Nelamangala - Doddaballapur- Chikkaballapur	Chikkaballapur, Bangalore rural Bangalore Urban Ramanagar	150
KA SH 75	Balki - Humnabad - Kabirwadi - Chitaguppa - Inapur- Karakmukli - Chincholi		81
KA SH 76	Birur - Ajjampura - Channagiri - Santhebennur - Davangere		212
KA SH 77	Sirsi - Soraba - Masur - Sagara - Purappemane - Bettamallppa - Hosnagar		111
KA SH 78	Shettihalli - Dhaddi - Hatharagi - Hukkeri - Chikodi - Examba - Sadalga- Borangaon- Ichalakaranji		88
KA SH 79	Srirangapatna - Sosale - T Narsipura - Madapura - Kollegal - Ramapura - Kowdalli - Hanur - Palar- Malemahadeshwarabetta		149
KA SH 80	Nanjangud - Chamarajanagar - Kyathadevara Gudi- Biligiriranganabetta		86
KA SH 81	Yelandur - Honganoor - Chamarajanagar - Terakanambi- Gundlupet		55
KA SH 82	Hoskote - Chintamani- Gownipalli		88
KA SH 83	Manuli - Kadakola - Gudachi - Salahalli - Konnur - Sirola - Holealur - Ron - Abbigere- Kotamachagi		121
KA SH 84	Sira - Gubbi - Chandrashekarapura, Tumkur Kallur - Yadayur - Amruthur - Mandya - Kirugaval - Hosavatti - T Narsipura- Nanjangud		229
KA SH 84	NH-212 - Varuna Hoskote Suththur -SH-84		17
KA SH 84	Kupparavalli on SH-84 - Suththur		4
KA SH 85	Bangalore - Magadi - Huliyurdurga - Nagamangala - KR Pet - Saligrama - Ramanathapura - Somwarpet - Vanagur - Subramanya - Jalsoor		329
KA SH 86	Ramanathapura - Bachhehalli - Kattemalalavadi - Hunsur - HD Kote - Saragur - Begur - Madapatna- Terakanambi		154
KA SH 87	Bangalore - Bannerghatta- Anekal		49
KA SH 88	Mysore - Hunsur - Periyapatna - Bylakuppe - Kushalanagar - Madikeri - Sulya - Puttur- Bhantwal		220
KA SH 89	Madakeri - Siddapura - Ghattathala - Chennyanakote - Athur -l Gonikoppal- Kutta		98
KA SH 90	Hunsur - Virajpet - Napoklu - Nalkanadu - Bhagamandala- Talakaveri		113
KA SH 91	Konanur - Ramanathapura - Kushalanagar - Siddapura - Virajpet- Makutta		90
KA SH 92	Kanakapura - Sangam		30
KA SH 93	Khanapura - Haliyal - Yellapura - Sirsi NH 766E in sirsi city limits- Siddapura - Talaguppa		196
KA SH 94	Bagepalli - Gudibande - Manchenahalli - Thondebhavi - Kudur - Magadi -Jalamangala Ramanagar - Channapatna- Halaguru		232
KA SH 95	Hoskote - Malur - Tekal - Bangarpet - BEML Nagar - Venkatagirikote		84
KA SH 96	Devanahalli - Vijayapura - Vemgal - Kolar - Ghattakamadanahalli - KGF- Kempapura		68
KA SH 97	Sankeshwar - Kowthalli - Nippani - Badkihal - Shamanewadi - Sadalga		47
KA SH 98	Bhatnagoor - Barawada - Mangura - Karagad- Boragaonwadi		43
KA SH 99	Kothapalli - Gownipalli - Rajepalli - Srinivasapura - Kolar - Tekal- Masti		103
KA SH 100	Kukke Subramanya - Panja - Kaniyooru - Puttur - Parladka - Punacha - Ukkuda- Kanyana- Anekallu- Hosangady - Manjeswar		89
KA SH 101	Surathkal - Bajpe - Gurupura - Bantwal - Panemangalore - Panolibailu - Manchi - Vittal - Kabaka (Near Puttur )		76
KA SH 102	Huliyar Keralapura - Arasikere - Haranahalli - Shanthigrama - Hariharapura - Jakkanahalli of Holenarsipura - Jayachamarajapura		
KA SH 103	Gokak - SH-31 to Muragodu - Karimani - Sogal-kshetra - Munnoli - Malaprabha - Goravanakolla - Saundatti		67
KA SH 104	Bangalore - Kadugondahalli - Nagavara - Thanisandra - Bellahalli - Kannur - Bagalur - Arisinakunte - Devanahalli - Malligenahalli - Karahalli - Nandi		50
KA SH 105	Humnabad - Bidar		47
KA SH 106	Horanadu - Balur H andpost - Kalasa		42
KA SH 107	Jannapura - Vanagur -Huradi Hanabal Anemahal Skaleshpura Byakarahalli Hethur		56
KA SH 108	Holenarsipura - KR Nagar - Hallimysore Saligrama Chunchanakatte Kesthur Koppalu Gate Srirampura Hebbalu		45
KA SH 109	Yarane Junction - Holenarsipura - Bikanahalli Channiganahalli Ankapura Karle Hanumanahalli Paduvalahippe		35
KA SH 110	Belur - Kodlipet - Bichodu Vatehole Kamathikodigi Byrapura Kundur K Hosakote Magalu		
KA SH 111	Doddagangavadi Gate - Chowdanakuppe - Doddagangavadi Virupas - Tavarekere Bandigowdanapalya		21
KA SH 112	Belur Bikkodu, Ballupet K Hosakote Magalu KarnatakaKodlipete - Somvarpet		63
KA SH 112A	SH-8 - SH-57 - CR Patna Holenarsipura Kodlipet		22
KA SH 113	Uppinangadi on NH-48 - SH-37 (Bisley Ghat Road - MDR) - Bajaththur Alankaru Balya Kadaba		33
KA SH 114	Gundya on NH-48 - Kalkunda on SH-37 - Shiribagilu Kombharu Bilinele		16
KA SH 115	Kudligere - Kammaraghattta		38
KA SH 116	Tumkur Honnavar road (SH-68) - Birur Sammasagi road (SH-76) - Bhadravathi Shivani road		34
KA SH 117	Ilawala - KR Nagara KA SH-117		22
KA SH 118	Guruvayanakere - Uppinangadi - Puttur KA SH-118		20
KA SH 119	Ilawala - Nagarakatte - KR Nagara KA SH-119		7
KA SH 120	Hampapura - Saligrama KA SH-120		17
KA SH 121	BT Road - Kodlihalli Road KA SH-121		17
KA SH 122	MaharaKA SHtra Border - Handaraki KA SH-122		183.60
KA SH 123	AP Border - Hulsur KA SH-123		69.95
KA SH 124	Kharked Sindhi-BB, Ingalgi-Tumbgi-Talikoti-Muddebihal-Hoovinhippargi-Basavana.Bagewadi-kolhara- Bilagi KA SH-124		294.07
KA SH 125	Firozbad Cross - Kamlapur KA SH-125		105.55
KA SH 126	AP Border - Bosga KA SH-126		163.97
KA SH 127	KA SH 10 - A P Border KA SH-127		174.95
KA SH 128	KA SH 61 - Bellary KA SH-128		231
KA SH 129	Chikkahesarur - Mundaragi KA SH-129		166.87
KA SH 130	Yalburga - Munirabad KA SH-130		122.80
KA SH 131	Hampi - Hagaribommanahalli KA SH-131		208.30
KA SH 132	Kampli - Kurugodu - Kudatini - Haraginadoni - Bellary - Moka - Andhra Border KA SH-132		100.00
KA SH 133	Surebana - Kudalasangama KA SH-133		108.90
KA SH 134	Badami - Gokak - Gokak Falls - Konnur -Hidkal Dam - Thanahattargi - NH 4		120.00
KA SH 135	Banashankari - Almatti Dam KA SH-135		71.20
KA SH 136	Gajendragad - Soraba KA SH-136		285.62
KA SH 137	Navalagund - Mugavalli KA SH-137		140.81
KA SH 138	Nagaragali - Katakola KA SH-138		112.58
KA SH 139	Yaragatti - Mudhola KA SH-139		77.68
KA SH 140	Alnavar - Betageri KA SH-140		84.85
KA SH 141	Maharashtra Border - Sutagatti - Joining NH 4 KA SH-141		45.80
KA SH 143	Gokarna - Sirsi KA SH-143		
KA SH 144	Honnavar - Menasi KA SH-144		60.28
KA SH 145	Songimane - Unchalli Falls KA SH-145		71.66
KA SH 146	Ulavi – Goa Border KA SH-146, Via Kumbarwada, Diggi	Uttara Kannada, Goa	63.20
KA SH 148	Ayanur – Thirthahalli KA SH-148, Via Hanagere, Kannangi, Bejjavalli	Shivamogga, Karnataka	38.0
KA SH 155	Ilkal - Karadi-Nagarhal - Narayanpur Rural - Kodekal - Hunasagi - Kolihal Cross - Mudanoor - Kembhavi - Malla - Malli - Yadrami - Ijeri - Jevargi | Bagalkote - Yadagiri - Kalaburgi		
KA SH 188	Tinthni Kakkera Srinivaspura Hunasagi Ambhanagar Islampur Basava.Calony Kolihal Navadagi (belur)Byalal Cross Pirapur Cross Bantanur Gotakhandki Tumbagi		
