= State Highway 3 (Karnataka) =

Road in Karnataka, India

State Highway 3

Route information
- Maintained by KPWD
- Length: 249 km (155 mi)

Major junctions
- South end: Hunasanahalli, Ramanagara
- North end: Chikkahalli, Tumkur

Location
- Country: India
- State: Karnataka
- Districts: Ramanagara, Bangalore Rural, Tumkur
- Primary destinations: Kanakapura, Ramanagara, Magadi, Pavagada

Highway system
- Roads in India; Expressways; National; State; Asian; State Highways in Karnataka

Karnataka State Highway 3, commonly referred to as KA SH 3, is a normal state highway that runs north through Ramanagara, Bangalore Rural and Tumkur districts in the state of Karnataka, India. This state highway touches numerous cities and villages Viz.Kanakapura, Ramanagara, Magadi and Pavagada. The total length of the highway is 249 km. SH 3 intersects with National Highway 948 at Kanakapura Town. Certain sections of this state highway (i.e Ramanagara - Kanakapura, Magadi - Dobbaspet) have been upgraded to NH-948A.

== Route description ==
The route followed by this highway is Hunasanahalli – Kanakapura – Ramanagara – Magadi – Solur – Shivagange – Dobbaspet a.k.a. Somapura - Koratagere – Madhugiri – Pavagada – Chikkahalli

== Major junctions ==
=== National highways ===
NH 948 at Kanakapura
NH 275 near Ramanagara
NH 75 near Gudemaranahalli
NH 48 at Dobbaspet
NH 648 at Dobbaspet
NH 69 at Madhugiri

=== State highways ===
SH 92 at Kanakapura
SH 17 at Ramanagara
SH 94 at Ramanagara
SH 85 at Magadi
SH 48 at Pavagada

== Connections ==
Many villages, cities and towns in various districts are connected by this state highway.

== See also ==
- List of state highways in Karnataka
