= State Highway 6 (Karnataka) =

State highway in Karnataka, India

State Highway 6

Route information
- Maintained by KPWD
- Length: 332 km (206 mi)

Major junctions
- From: Karwar
- To: Ilkal, Bagalkot

Location
- Country: India
- State: Karnataka
- Districts: Uttara Kannada, Haveri, Gadag, Bagalkot
- Primary destinations: Yellapura, Gadag

Highway system
- Roads in India; Expressways; National; State; Asian; State Highways in Karnataka

Karnataka State Highway 6, commonly referred to as KA SH 6, is a normal state highway that runs through Uttara Kannada, Haveri, Gadag and Bagalkot districts in the state of Karnataka. This state highway touches numerous cities and villages Viz.Kaiga, Yellapura and Gadag. The total length of the highway is 332 km.

== Route description ==
The route followed by this highway is Karwar - Kaiga - Yellapura - Mundgod - Bankapura - Savanur -laxmeshwar-Gadag - Gajendragarh -

Hanumasagara - Ilkal

== See also ==
- List of state highways in Karnataka
