= State Highway 2 (Karnataka) =

Road in Karnataka, India

State Highway 2

Route information
- Maintained by KPWD
- Length: 180 km (110 mi)

Major junctions
- From: Haveri
- To: Molakalmuru, Chitradurga

Location
- Country: India
- State: Karnataka
- Districts: Haveri, Vijayanagara, Chitradurga
- Primary destinations: [[[Haveri]], Harapanahalli, Kudligi

Highway system
- Roads in India; Expressways; National; State; Asian; State Highways in Karnataka

Karnataka State Highway 2, commonly referred to as KA SH 2, is a state highway that runs through, Haveri, Vijayanagara and Chitradurga districts in the state of Karnataka. It starts from Haveri and terminates at Molakalmuru in Chitradurga District. The main destinations for this state highway are, Haveri, Harapanahalli and Kudligi. The total length of the highway is 180 km.

== Route description ==
The route followed by this highway is Yekkambi - Haveri - Mylara - Harapanahalli - Kudligi - Molakalmuru

== Major junctions ==
=== National Highways ===
- NH 48 at Haveri
- NH 50 at Kudligi
- (National Highway 766E ) Haveri

=== State Highways ===
- KA SH 62 at Haveri
- KA SH 40 at Mylara
- KA SH 25 and KA SH 47 at Harapanahalli
- KA SH 45 at Kotturu
- KA SH 40 at Kudligi

== Connections ==
Many villages, cities and towns in various districts are connected by this state highway.

== See also ==
- List of state highways in Karnataka
