= State Highway 69 (Karnataka) =

Road in Karnataka, India

State Highway 69

Route information
- Maintained by KPWD
- Length: 75 km (47 mi)

Major junctions
- North end: Tadas(NH 48)
- Mundgod
- South end: Sirsi(NH 766E)

Location
- Country: India
- State: Karnataka
- Districts: Haveri; Uttara Kannada
- Primary destinations: Sirsi

Highway system
- Roads in India; Expressways; National; State; Asian; State Highways in Karnataka

Karnataka State Highway 69(sirsi hubli rd) (KA SH 69), is a state highway that runs through Haveri and Uttara Kannada, district in the Indian state of Karnataka. This state highway touches numerous cities like Sirsi NH 766E, Mundgod, and Tadas. The total length of the highway is 75 kilometres (47 mi).
