= State Highway 93 (Karnataka) =

Road in Karnataka, India

State Highway 93

Route information
- Maintained by KPWD
- Length: 196 km (122 mi)

Major junctions
- North end: Khanapur
- Sirsi(NH 766E)
- South end: Talaguppa

Location
- Country: India
- State: Karnataka
- Districts: Belagavi; Uttara Kannada; Shivamogga
- Primary destinations: Sirsi

Highway system
- Roads in India; Expressways; National; State; Asian; State Highways in Karnataka

Karnataka State Highway 93 (KA SH 93) is a state highway that runs through Belagavi, Uttara Kannada, Shivamogga districts in the Indian state of Karnataka. This state highway touches numerous cities like Khanapur, Alnavar, Haliyal, Yellapura, Sirsi, Siddapura, and Talaguppa. The total length of the highway is 196 kilometres (122 mi).
