= State Highway 65 (Karnataka) =

State highway in Karnataka, India

State Highway 65

Route information
- Maintained by Karnataka Road Development Corporation Limited
- Length: 381.74 km (237.20 mi)

Major junctions
- East end: Molakalmuru
- West end: Malpe

Location
- Country: India
- State: Karnataka
- Districts: Udupi, Chikkamagaluru, Shivamogga, Davangere and Chitradurga
- Primary destinations: Udupi, Agumbe, Bhadravathi, Channagiri, Davangere, Jagalur

Highway system
- Roads in India; Expressways; National; State; Asian; State Highways in Karnataka

State Highway 65 is a state highway connecting Malpe and Molakalmuru. It spans roughly 382 km.

Major cities and villages on this highway are as follows (from west to east): Malpe, Udupi, Manipal, Shivapura, Hebri, Agumbe, Hosagadde, Begaru, Niluvagilu, Hariharapura, Koppa, Kuduregundi, Narasimharajapura, Muttinakoppa, Umblebylu, Hunasekatte Junction, Bhadravathi, Aralihalli, Arebilachi Camp, Haronahalli, Channagiri, Chikkulikere, Arishinaghatta, Sulekere, Kerebilchi, Doddaghatta, Kukkavada, Hadadi, Javalagatta, Shiramagondanahalli, Nittuvalli, Davangere, Aanekonda, Bethur, Anaji, Bilichodu, Devikere, Rastemachikere, Jagalur, Jagalur Cross, Taitoni, Kamandalagondi, Chikkamallanahole, Abbenahalli, B.G Kere, Kondlahalli, Nerlahalli, Marlahalli, Molakalmuru.
