= State Highway 104 (Karnataka) =

State highway in Karnataka, India

State Highway 104

Route information
- Maintained by Karnataka Public Works Department
- Length: 50 km (31 mi)

Major junctions
- South end: Bangalore
- North end: Nandi Hills

Location
- Country: India
- State: Karnataka
- Districts: Bangalore Urban, Bangalore Rural, Chikkaballapur
- Primary destinations: Devanahalli, Bagalur

Highway system
- Roads in India; Expressways; National; State; Asian; State Highways in Karnataka

State Highway 104 is a state highway in the state of Karnataka connecting Bangalore with Nandi Hills via Devanahalli and Bagalur. It has a total length of 50 kilometres (31 mi). In 2008, it was considered as an alternate access route to the Bengaluru International Airport.

== See also ==
- National Highway 7 (India)
