= State Highway 77 (Karnataka) =

Road in Karnataka, India

State Highway 77

Route information
- Maintained by KPWD
- Length: 95 km (59 mi)

Major junctions
- North end: Sirsi(NH 766E)
- Banavasi; Soraba; Sagara
- South end: Hosanagara( NH 766C )

Location
- Country: India
- State: Karnataka
- Districts: Uttara Kannada; Shivamogga
- Primary destinations: Sirsi

Highway system
- Roads in India; Expressways; National; State; Asian; State Highways in Karnataka

Karnataka State Highway 77 (KA SH 77) is a state highway that runs through Uttara Kannada and Shivamogga districts in the Indian state of Karnataka. This state highway touches numerous cities like Sirsi, Banavasi, Soraba, Sagara, and Hosanagara (NH 766C). The total length of the highway is 95 kilometres (59 mi).
