= Emmiganur =

- village
- Location in Karnataka, India Emmiganur (India)
- Coordinates: 15.15°N 76.92°E
- Country: India
- State: Karnataka
- District: Bellary
- Talukas: Kampli

Government
  - Body: Gram panchayat

Population (2001)
  - Total: 12,720

Languages
  - Official: Kannada
- Time zone: UTC+5:30 (IST)
- ISO 3166 code: IN-KA
- Vehicle registration: KA
- Website: karnataka.gov.in

Emmiganur is a village in the southern state of Karnataka, India. It is located in the Kampli taluk of Bellary district in Karnataka.

== Demographics ==
As of the 2001 Indian census, Emmiganur had a population of 12,720, with 6415 males and 6305 females.

== See also ==
- Bellary
- Districts of Karnataka
