= Kaggalada Hundi =

- Village
- Location in Karnataka, India
- Coordinates: 11.810463°N 76.752668°E
- Country: India
- State: Karnataka
- District: Chamarajanagar
- Taluk: Gundlupet

Population (2001)
  - Total: 600

Languages
  - Official: Kannada
- Time zone: UTC+5:30 (IST)
- PIN: 571111
- Telephone code: 08229
- Lok Sabha constituency: Chamarajanagar
- Vidhan Sabha constituency: Gundlupet

Kaggalada Hundi or Kaggaladahundi is a village in Terakanambi Hobli Gundlupete Taluk Chamarajanagar district in the southern state of Karnataka, India.
