= Aalwad =

- village
- Location in Karnataka, India Aalwad (India)
- Coordinates: 14.964645°N 74.706001°E
- Country: India
- State: Karnataka
- District: Uttara Kannada
- Talukas: Yellapur

Government
  - Body: Village Panchayat

Languages
  - Official: Kannada
- Time zone: UTC+5:30 (IST)
- Nearest city: Uttara Kannada
- Civic agency: Village Panchayat

Aalwad is a village in the southern state of Karnataka, India. It is located in the Yellapur taluk of Uttara Kannada district.

== See also ==
- Uttara Kannada
- Districts of Karnataka
