= Nagasamudra =

- village
- Location in Karnataka, India Nagasamudra (India)
- Coordinates: 14.72°N 76.76°E
- Country: India
- State: Karnataka
- District: Chitradurga
- Talukas: Molakalmuru

Government
  - Body: Gram panchayat

Population (2001)
  - Total: 7,319

Languages
  - Official: Kannada
- Time zone: UTC+5:30 (IST)
- ISO 3166 code: IN-KA
- Vehicle registration: KA
- Website: karnataka.gov.in

Nagasamudra is a village in the southern state of Karnataka, India. It is located in the Molakalmuru taluk of Chitradurga district in Karnataka.

== Demographics ==
As of 2001 India census, Nagasamudra had a population of 7319 with 3728 males and 3591 females.

== See also ==
- Chitradurga
- Districts of Karnataka
