= Kakkali =

Kakkalli or Kokkalli is a village in Uttara Kannada district of Sirsi taluk in Karnataka. There are 227 people in Kakkalli currently. Nearest towns from Kakkalli were:

- Sirsi (20 km)
- Yellapur (30 km)
- Ankola (40 km)
- Hubli (100 km)
