= State Highway 5 (Karnataka) =

State highway in Karnataka, India

State Highway 5

Route information
- Maintained by KPWD
- Length: 106 km (66 mi)

Major junctions
- From: Bagepalli, Chikballapur
- To: Bangarpet, Kolar

Location
- Country: India
- State: Karnataka
- Districts: Chikballapur, Kolar
- Primary destinations: Chintamani, Kolar

Highway system
- Roads in India; Expressways; National; State; Asian; State Highways in Karnataka

Karnataka State Highway 5, commonly referred to as KA SH 5, is a state highway that runs through Chikballapur and Kolar districts in the state of Karnataka. The primary destinations of this highway are Chintamani and Kolar. The total length of the highway is 106 km.

== Route description ==
The route followed by this highway is Bagepalli - Chintamani - Kolar - Bangarpet.

== Major junctions ==
=== National Highways ===
- NH 44 at Bagepalli
- NH 75 at Kolar

=== State Highways ===
- KA SH 94 at Bagepalli
- KA SH 82 at Chintamani
- KA SH 96 at Kolar
- KA SH 95 at Bangarpet

== See also ==
- List of state highways in Karnataka
