= National Highway 948A (India) =

National highway in India

National Highway 948A

Route information
- Length: 185 km (115 mi)

Major junctions
- From: National Highway 648, Dobbaspet
- To: National Highway 48, Sarjapura

Location
- Country: India
- States: Karnataka; Tamil Nadu

Highway system
- Roads in India; Expressways; National; State; Asian

National Highway 948A : Commonly called NH 948A, is a national highway in the states of Karnataka and Tamil Nadu in India. And it is connected to Dabaspete - Ramanagara - Hosur expressway It is a secondary route of National Highway 48.

== See also ==
- List of national highways in India
