= Agalagandi =

- village
- Interactive map of Agalagandi
- Coordinates: 13.3891°N 75.3339°E
- Country: India
- State: Karnataka
- District: Chikkamagaluru
- Talukas: Koppa

Government
  - Body: Village Panchayat

Languages
  - Official: Kannada
- Time zone: UTC+5:30 (IST)
- Nearest city: Chikmagalur
- Civic agency: Village Panchayat

Agalagandi is a village in the southern state of Karnataka, India. It is located in the Koppa taluk of Chikkamagaluru district in Karnataka.

== See also ==
- Chikmagalur
- Districts of Karnataka
