= Konsagara =

- village
- Location in Karnataka, India Konsagara (India)
- Coordinates: 14.72°N 76.76°E
- Country: India
- State: Karnataka
- District: Chitradurga
- Talukas: Molakalmuru

Population (2001)
  - Total: 6,234

Languages
  - Official: Kannada
- Time zone: UTC+5:30 (IST)

Konsagara is a village in the southern state of Karnataka, India. It is located in the Molakalmuru taluk of Chitradurga district in Karnataka.

== Demographics ==
As of 2001 India census, Konsagara had a population of 6234 with 3173 males and 3061 females.

== See also ==
- Chitradurga
- Districts of Karnataka
