= Yelasi =

Village in Karnataka, India

Coordinates: 14°23′N 75°03′E

Yelasi is a small village in Sorab Taluk in Shimoga district of Karnataka state, India. It belongs to the Bangalore division. It is located 83 km towards the west from district headquarters, Shimoga.

== Demographics ==
The local language is Kannada.

== Education ==
Schools in Yelasi include:

- Ghps Yelasi
