= Kondlahalli =

- village
- Location in Karnataka, India Kondlahalli (India)
- Coordinates: 14.72°N 76.76°E
- Country: India
- State: Karnataka
- District: Chitradurga
- Founder: kondalamma devi
- Named for: kondala
- Talukas: Molakalmuru

Government
  - Type: village panchayat
  - Body: village gram panchayat

Population (2014)
  - Total: 10,125

Languages
  - Official: Kannada
- Time zone: UTC+5:30 (IST)
- PIN: 577529
- Telephone code: 08198
- Climate: Normal 32°C to 40°C (Köppen)

Kondlahalli is a village in the southern state of Karnataka, India. It is located in the Molakalmuru taluk of Chitradurga district in Karnataka.

== Demographics ==
As of 2014 India census, Kondlahalli had a population of 10125 with 5100 males and 5025 females.

== See also ==
- Chitradurga
- Districts of Karnataka
