= Attiveri Bird Sanctuary =

Tourist destination in Karnataka

- IUCN category IV (habitat/species management area)
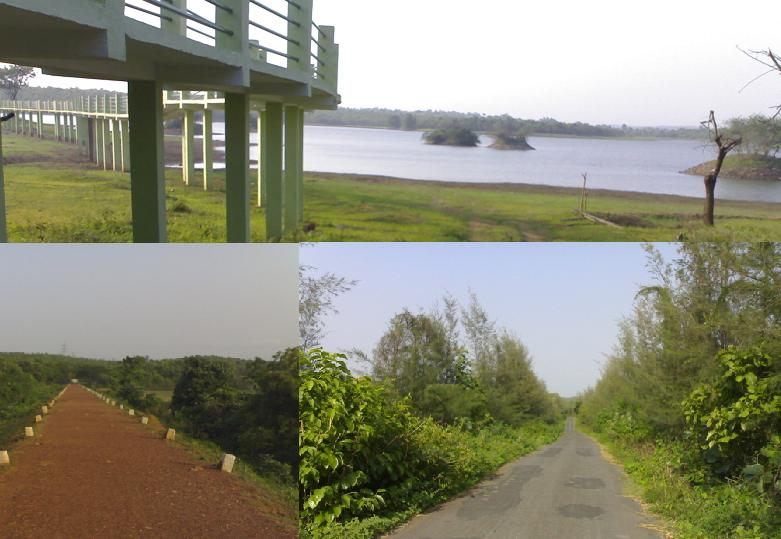

- Location within Karnataka Location within India
- Interactive map of Attiveri Bird Sanctuary
- Coordinates: 15°4′44″N 75°2′29″E

Attiveri Bird Sanctuary is a village in the Mundgod taluk of Uttara Kannada district in Karnataka. It is located 15 km away from Mundgod.

Spread over an area of about 2.23 km^{2} (0.86 sq mi), the sanctuary is located in and around the Attiveri reservoir. The part of the sanctuary surrounding the reservoir has riverine and deciduous forests.

Birds inhabiting this area include cattle egret, Indian and little cormorants, black-headed ibis, Eurasian spoonbill, pied and white-throated kingfishers, Indian grey hornbill and barn swallow. The agricultural fields surrounding the sanctuary attract a variety of aquatic creatures.

The best time to visit the sanctuary is between November and March.
