= Hariharapura =

- Village
- Location in Karnataka, India Hariharapura (India)
- Coordinates: 13°30′4″N 75°18′44″E
- Country: India
- State: Karnataka
- District: Chikmagalur
- Taluk: Koppa
- Region: Malenadu

Government
  - Body: Grama Panchayath

Area
  - Total: 6.45 km^{2} (2.49 sq mi)
- Elevation: 636 m (2,087 ft)

Population (2011)
  - Total: 2,456
  - Density: 381/km^{2} (986/sq mi)

Languages
  - Official: Kannada
- Time zone: UTC+5:30 (IST)
- PIN: 577120
- Telephone code: +91-8265
- Vehicle registration: KA-18 (Chikmagalur); KA-66 (Tarikere)
- Nearest city: Shimoga
- Lok Sabha constituency: Udupi-Chikmagalur

Hariharapura is a village located in the Koppa Taluk, Chikmagalur district in the state of Karnataka, India. The place has a matha (Hindu temple) of goddess Sharadamba on the banks of the Tunga River. The place is serene amidst forest, Arecanut farms and rice fields and surrounded by small hills. It is believed that Daksha performed "yagna" here.

It was also a taluk headquarter of Koppa taluk. The National Highway 169 (India) and State Highway 65 (Karnataka) pass through Hariharapura, connecting it to the cities Shimoga, Mangalore and Udupi.

== Origin of the name ==
The name of the place is derived by the presence of two temples Hari and Hara located across each other. The Krta Yuga- Swayambhu Shivalinga (Hara) temple which was later renovated by the Kings of Keladi is located upstream on the banks of the River Tunga, about a kilometer away from the matha.

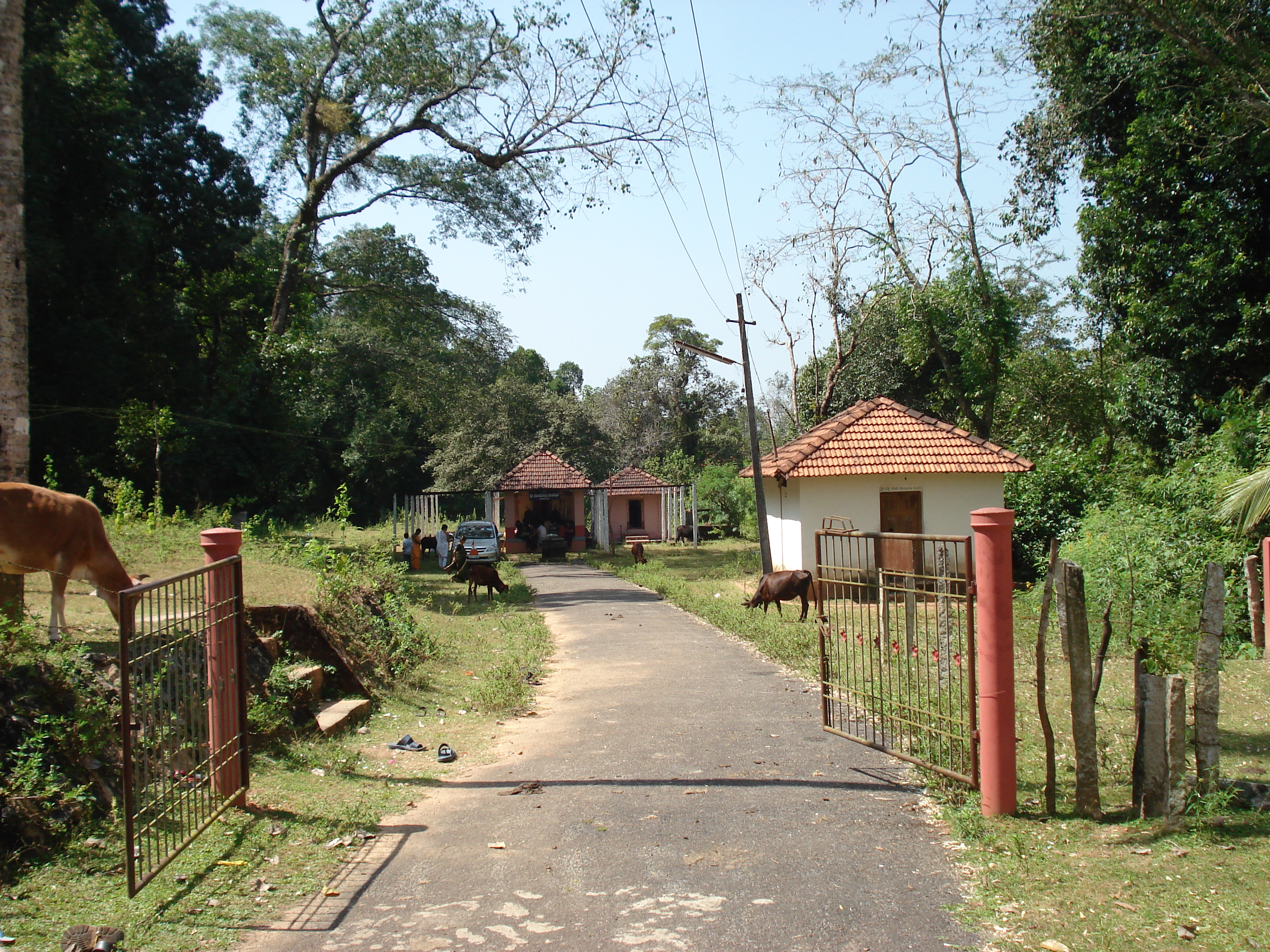
Sri Someshwara Temple

== Places of interest ==
Hariharapura also boasts of a 110-year-old bridge across the Tunga connecting it to Koppa. This bridge is believed to have been built by M. Visvesvaraya. Hariharapura is an ideal place to visit the surrounding places in the western ghat region.

Hanging Bridge is a small pedestrian suspension bridge leads to Chitrakoota, home to Prabodhini Gurukula. Built across the Tunga, it features a unique cable design and offers a view of the river.

== Sri Math ==
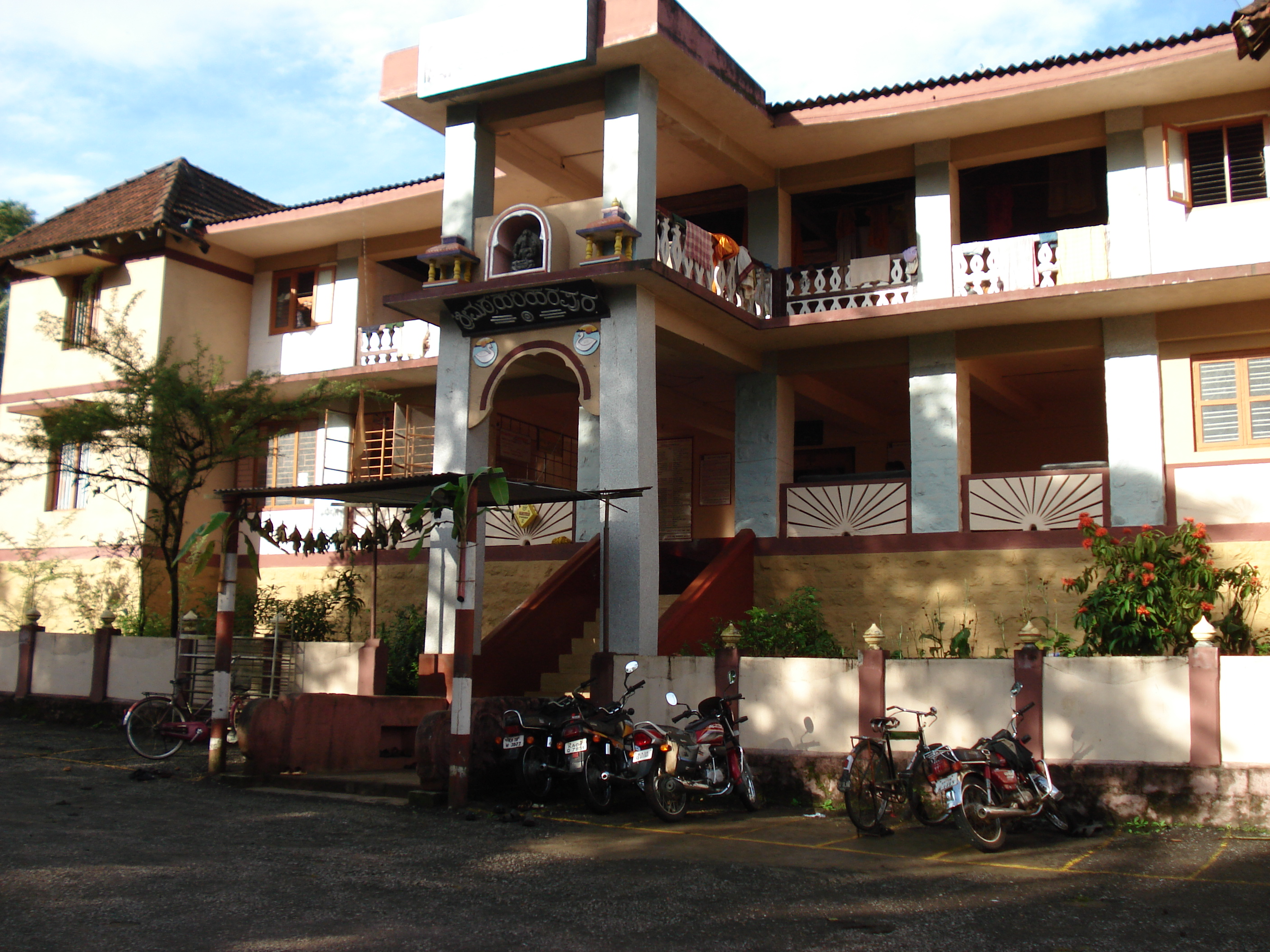
Sri Math Hariharapura

It is believed that the Holy math of Hariharapura was a consequence of Bhagavadpada Sri Adi Shankaracharya's visit to this village. During his visit, he met young Sri Yogi Krishna who came from Saurashtra Desha to then Dakshashrama (Present Day Hariharapura) & performed penance, moved by the divine vibrations of this place, Sri Adi shankaracharya chose to install Sri Chakra here and consecrated Mother Sharadamba & Jagadguru Adi Shankaracharya initiated Mantra Upadesha to Sri Yogi Krishna & later Sri Sureshwaracharya gave Sanyasa deeksha to Sri Yogi Krishna & Blessed him Yogapatta " Sri Swayamprakasha Krishna Yogeendra Saraswathi Shankaracharya "and from then Sri Adi shankaracharya Sharada Lakshmi Narasimha Peetam came into existence.
