= State Highway 10 (Karnataka) =

State highway in Karnataka, India

State Highway 10

Route information
- Maintained by Karnataka Road Development Corporation Limited
- Length: 147 km (91 mi)

Major junctions
- From: Sarasamba
- To: Ribbonpalli

Location
- Country: India
- State: Karnataka
- Districts: Kalaburagi
- Primary destinations: Aland, Gulbarga, Sedam

Highway system
- Roads in India; Expressways; National; State; Asian; State Highways in Karnataka

State Highway 10 is a state highway connecting Sarasamba and Ribbonpalli in the South Indian state of Karnataka.It has a total length of 147 kilometres (91 mi). It was the first State Highway in Karnataka to be tolled.
