= Kudligere =

- village

Kudligere is hobli and village of the Bhadravathi taluk, Shimoga district, Karnataka, India. It also have a reserve forest and a range office.
