= Kattemalalavadi =

- village
- Interactive map of Kattemalalavadi
- Coordinates: 12°21′11″N 76°17′24″E
- Country: India
- State: Karnataka
- District: Mysore
- Talukas: Hunsur

Government
  - Type: Panchayat raj
  - Body: Gram panchayat
- Elevation: 788 m (2,585 ft)

Population (2011)
  - Total: 6,208

Languages
  - Official: Kannada
- Time zone: UTC+5:30 (IST)
- Postal code: 571134
- ISO 3166 code: IN-KA
- Vehicle registration: KA 45
- Website: karnataka.gov.in

Kattemalalavadi is a village in the southern state of Karnataka, India. It is located in the Hunsur taluk of Mysore district in Karnataka.

== Demographics ==
As of 2011 India census, Kattemalalavadi had a population of 6208 with 3105 males and 3103 females.

== Education ==
There is a public library

• Anganwadi - More than 3

• Government primary school -1

• Government High School -1

• Government urdu school -1

• PES primary school

== Transport ==
SH86 passes through KATTEMALALAVADI.

Frequent Bus facility available to hunsur and krishna rajanagara. The nearest railway stations are k r nagar[14 km] and Mysore junction railway station [49 km]

Nearest Airports are Mysore airport, Kannur International Airport, Manglore International Airport and Kempegowda International Airport, located at 63 km, 116 km, 217 km and 223 km respectively

== Temples ==
• sidiyamma temple

• Basavanagudi temple

• venkata chalapati temple

• marigudi temple

• Sri Rama Mandira

• Ganesha temple
