= Gownipalli =

Gownipalli Santha Gownipalli
- Village /Town
- Nickname: Sante Gownipalli
- Location in Karnataka, India Gownipalli (India)
- Coordinates: 13.514°N 78.227°E
- Country: India
- State: Karnataka
- District: Kolar
- Taluks: Srinivaspur

Population (2001)
  - Total: 5,033

Languages
  - Official: Kannada
- Time zone: UTC+5:30 (IST)
- Postal code: 563161
- Vehicle registration: KA07

Gownipalli is a popular village in the southern state of Karnataka, India. It is located in the Srinivaspur taluk of Kolar district in Karnataka.

== Demographics ==
As of 2001 India census, Gownipalli had a population of 5033, of whom 2576 are males and 2457 females.

== See also ==
- Kolar
- Districts of Karnataka
