= Konnur =

- city
- Location in Karnataka, India
- Coordinates: 16.2°N 74.75°E
- Country: India
- State: Karnataka
- District: Belagavi District
- Established: 1979

Government
  - Body: Town municipal council
- Elevation: 606 m (1,988 ft)

Population (2011)
  - Total: 27,474

Languages
  - Official: Kannada
- Time zone: UTC+5:30 (IST)
- Postal code: 591231
- Vehicle registration: KA 49
- Website: http://www.konnurtown.mrc.gov.in

Konnur is a municipal council in the Belagavi District of Karnataka, India. It is located at 16.2°N 74.75°E and has an average elevation of 606 metres (1988 feet).

== Demographics ==
As of 2011 India census, Konnur had a population of 27,474. Males constitute 51% of the population and females 49%. Konnur has an average literacy rate of 60%, higher than the national average of 59.5%: male literacy is 70%, and female literacy is 49%. In Konnur, 13% of the population is under 6 years of age.
