= Dobbaspet =

Coordinates: 13°14′N 77°14′E

Dobbaspet Dabaspete (Sompura)
- Village
- Location within Karnataka
- Country: India
- State: Karnataka
- District: Bangalore Rural

Government
  - Body: Town Panchayath

Area _as_of_2011
  - Total: 1.85 km^{2} (0.71 sq mi)
- Elevation: 960 m (3,150 ft)

Population
  - Total: 4,336
  - Density: 2,340/km^{2} (6,070/sq mi)

Languages
  - Official: Kannada
- Time zone: UTC+5:30 (IST)
- PIN: 562111
- Vehicle registration: KA-52

Dobbaspet (officially called Sompura) also known as Dabaspete, is a town located in Nelamangala Taluka of Bangalore Rural District in the Indian state of Karnataka. As per census survey of India 2011, location code number allotted to Sompura is 624774.

== Geography ==
It is part of Bangalore Metropolitan Region. It is named after Major General Richard Stewart Dobbs of British Indian Army and the first collector of Tumkur district. Dobbaspete is directly connected 51 km away from state capital Bangalore along NH 48 South-Eastbound, 22 km away from taluka headquarters Nelamangala along NH 48 South-Eastbound, 19 km away from Tumkur along NH 48 North-Westbound, 35 km away from Doddaballapura along NH 648 Eastbound, 38 km away from Koratagere along SH 3 Northbound, 8 km away from popular Hindu pilgrimage site of Shivagange along NH 948A Southbound.

== Economy ==
Due to it being part of Bangalore Metropolitan Region and very close proximity to towns such as Tumkur and well connected by a Golden quadrilateral NH 48, it has a KIADB Industrial Area housing many major industries related to mechanical, automobile, electrical engineering, etc.
