= Mannaekhalli =

Mannaekhalli chota ekhelli
- village
- Location in Karnataka, India Mannaekhalli (India)
- Coordinates: 17.72°N 77.36°E
- Country: India
- State: Karnataka
- District: Bidar
- Talukas: Chitguppa

Government
  - Type: Gram
  - Body: Panchayat of Mannaekhalli

Population (2011)
  - Total: 12,039
- Demonym(s): Mannaekhallikar, Mannaekhalliyavaru

Languages
  - Official: Kannada, Marathi, Hindi, Telugu,
- Time zone: UTC+5:30 (IST)
- Pin Code: 585227
- Vehicle registration: KA 39

Mannaekhalli is a small town in Bidar district in the southern state of Karnataka, India. It is 30km from Bidar district. It is located in the Chitguppa taluk of Bidar district in Karnataka.

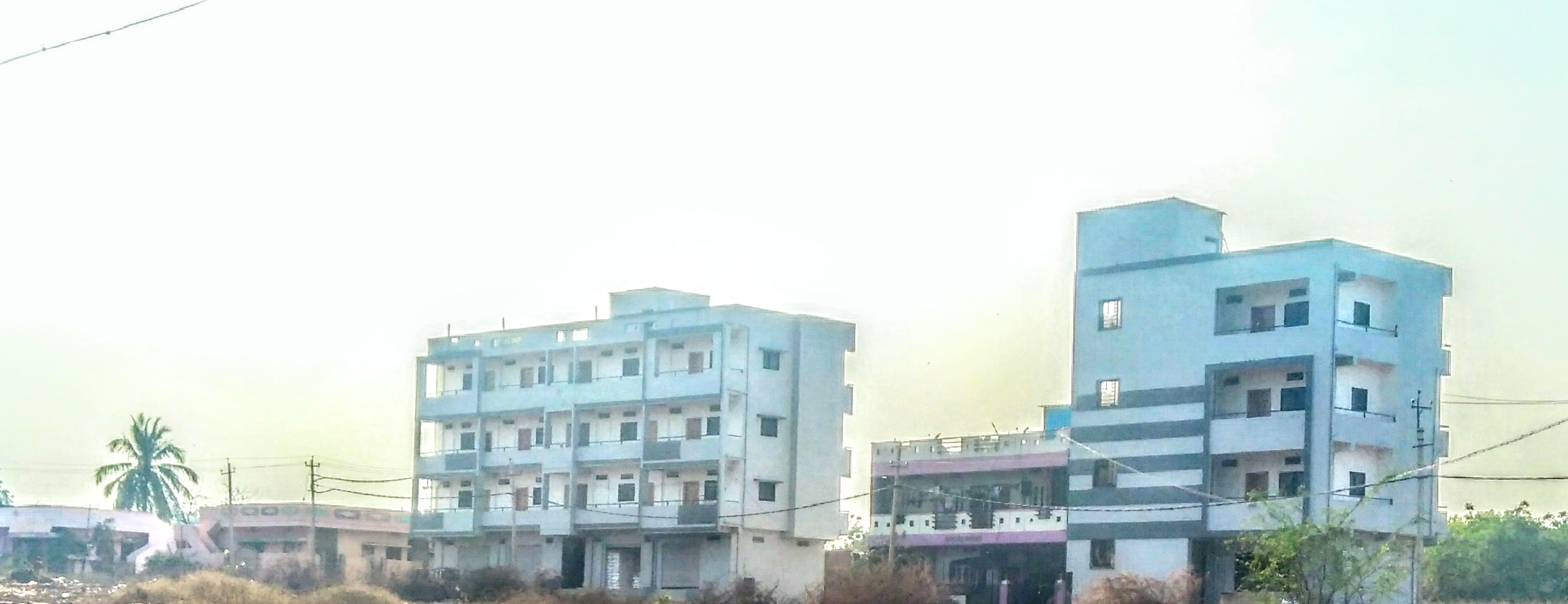
These are the Housing Apartments in Mannaekhelli

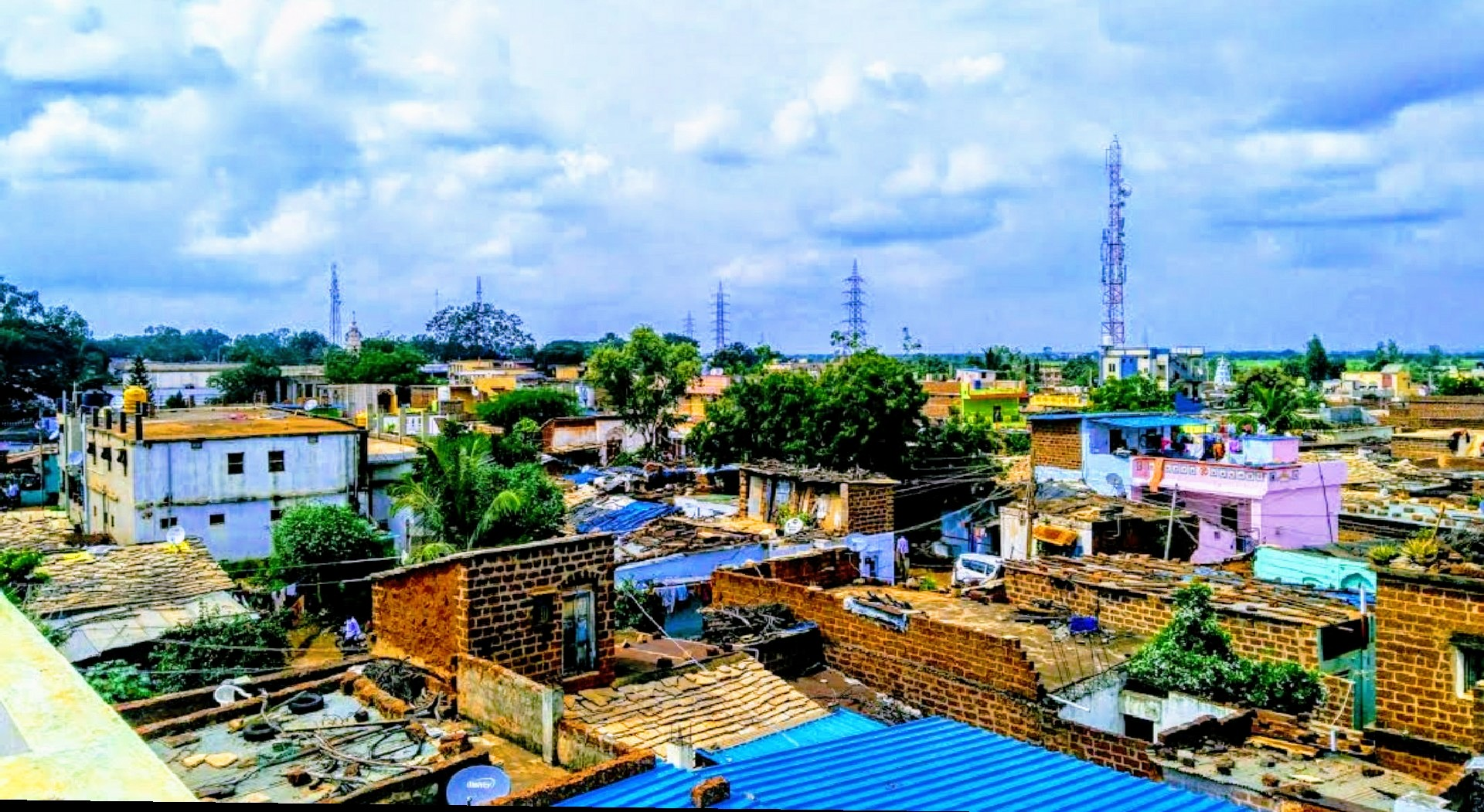
This image is showing Mannaekhelli village . This image shows Mannaekhelli Flyover

The Mannaekhelli village is located on Hyderabad-Mumbai Highway (NH-65) and equidistant to the Bidar (District) in the north, to the Zaheerabad (Taluk) in the east, to the Humnabad (Taluk) in the west, and to the Chincholi (Taluk) in the south.

== Demographics ==
As of 2001 India census, Mannaekhalli had a population of 9,740 with 5,049 males and 4,691 females.

== See also ==
- Bidar
- Districts of Karnataka
