= Akkatangerahal =

- Village
- Akkatangerahal is in Belagavi district
- Nickname: AK-hal
- Country: India
- State: Karnataka
- District: Belagavi
- Taluk: Gokak

Government
  - Type: Panchayat raj
  - Body: Village Panchayat

Area Temperature as high as 40 degrees in Summer and less than 10 degrees in Winter
  - Total: 4.71 km^{2} (1.82 sq mi)

Population (2001)
  - Total: 10,000(approx)
  - Density: 2,100/km^{2} (5,500/sq mi)

Languages
  - Official: Kannada
- Time zone: UTC+5:30 (IST)
- Postal code: 591101
- ISO 3166 code: IN-KA
- Vehicle registration: KA-49
- Nearest city: Belagavi
- Civic agency: Village Panchayat
- Website: karnataka.gov.in

Akkatangerahal is a village in Gokak taluk, Belagavi district of Karnataka state in Southern India. It is located in the Gokak Taluk of Belagavi district in Karnataka.

== Etymology ==
"Akkatangerahal" is a combination of three words. "Akka" stands for "Elder Sister" and "Tangi" stands for "Younger Sister", "Hal" stands for "Spoil".

== See also ==
- Belagavi
- Districts of Karnataka
