= Neermanvi =

- Village
- Location within Karnataka Location within India
- Coordinates: 16°2′36.03″N 77°5′56.64″E
- Country: India
- State: Karnataka
- District: Raichur district
- Taluk: Manvi

Languages
  - Official: Kannada
- Time zone: UTC+5:30 (IST)
- PIN: 584 143
- Telephone code: 08538
- Vehicle registration: KA-36

Neermanvi is a village in the southern state of Karnataka, India. It is located in the Manvi taluk of Raichur district in Karnataka.

Neermanvi is famous for goddess Sri Renuka Yellamma folk fair, locally called as Neermanvi Yellamma Jatre Mahotsava. This temple and fair has a 200-year history. It is one of the biggest folk fairs in Raichur district state of Karnataka. People from Karnataka, Telangana, Andhra Pradesh, Maharashtra and Chhattisgarh attend this pilgrimage. The fair is held on fifth day after Magha Suddha Purnima. Another fair is held on Deepavali amavasya called Gampa Yellamma jatre. Lord Yellamma-Pallaki is taken for holy bath to Tungabhadra River near by a village Pannuru in Manvi.

== Demographics ==
As of 2001 India census, Neermanvi had a population of 6427 with 3221 males and 3206 females.

== See also ==
- Raichur
- Districts of Karnataka
