= Manchi =

- village
- Location in Karnataka, India Manchi (India)
- Coordinates: 12.9°N 75.03°E
- Country: India
- State: Karnataka
- District: Dakshina Kannada
- Talukas: Bantwal

Government
  - Body: Gram panchayat

Population (2001)
  - Total: 6,981

Languages
  - Official: Kannada
- Time zone: UTC+5:30 (IST)
- PIN: 574323
- Telephone code: 082552*****
- ISO 3166 code: IN-KA
- Nearest city: Mangaluru
- Lok Sabha constituency: Dakshina Kannada (Lok Sabha constituency)
- Vidhan Sabha constituency: Bantwal Assembly Constituency
- Nearest Airport: Mangaluru Airport

Manchi is a village in the southern state of Karnataka, India. The village has most of the lands under agriculture. Over 90% of people are literate. The nearest town is B.C Road which is 12 km from Manchi. In Manchi there is a primary school established in 1950 and a high school. Roads connect B.C Road, Vitla, Mangalore and Kalladka. It is located in the Bantwal taluk of Dakshina Kannada district in Karnataka. The office of the gram panchayath is in Kukkaje.

== Demographics ==
As of the 2011 India census, Manchi had a population of 6981 with 3485 males and 3496 females. The major languages spoken are Tulu, Byari, Konkani and Kannada.

== Facilities ==
This is a rural area, with basic facilities like educational institutions, road-transport facility, electricity, telephone, stationery-grocery shops, irrigation, hospital, bank, and post office.

== Personalities ==
B V Karanth (dramatist)

== Agriculture ==
Areca nut has emerged as a main crop along with coconut, paddy, black pepper, vanilla, cocoa, banana, and vegetables. Rubber plantations have been introduced in non-agricultural land and dry land.

== See also ==
- Dakshina Kannada
- Districts of Karnataka
