= Kanapur =

Coordinates: 25°38′N 76°38′E

Kanapur is a village in Mahbubnagar district of Telangana, India. It is located 8 kilometers from Amangal.
