= Ijeri =

- village
- Location in Karnataka, India Ijeri (India)
- Coordinates: 16°54′35″N 076°42′56″E
- Country: India
- State: Karnataka
- District: Gulbarga
- Talukas: Jevargi

Population (2011)
  - Total: 6,761

Languages
  - Official: Kannada
- Time zone: UTC+5:30 (IST)

Ijeri is a village in the southern state of Karnataka, India. It is located in the Jevargi taluk of Kalaburagi district.

== Demographics ==
As of 2001 census of India, Ijeri had a population of 5,923 with 3,069 males and 2,854 females. The 2011 census of India shows that the population has risen to 6,761; consisting of 3419 males and 3342 females, with 1063 families residing in Ijeri village. Of the total population, there are 1105 children, 537 males and 567 females. The literacy rate is up to 55.99%, with 66.60% males and 45.16% females. Ijeri population has a lower literacy rate as compared to Karnataka. The work force of the village is divided into 83.42% (2805) describing their work as Main Work (employment or earning more than 6 months) while 16.58% of this population were involved in Marginal activities (providing livelihood for less than 6 months). Of the remaining work force, 737 were cultivators (owners or co-owners) and 1210 were Agricultural labourers.

== See also ==
- Gulbarga
- Districts of Karnataka
