= Shelawadi =

Coordinates: 15°35′N 75°28′E

- village
- Interactive map of Shelawadi
- Country: India
- State: Karnataka
- District: Dharwad
- Talukas: Navalgund

Government
  - Type: Panchayat raj
  - Body: Gram panchayat

Population (2011)
  - Total: 6,933

Languages
  - Official: Kannada
- Time zone: UTC+5:30 (IST)
- ISO 3166 code: IN-KA
- Vehicle registration: KA
- Website: karnataka.gov.in

Shelawadi or Shelavadi is a panchayat town in the southern state of Karnataka, India. It is located in the Navalgund taluk of Dharwad district in Karnataka.

== Demographics ==
As of the 2011 Census of India there were 1,366 households in Shelawadi and a total population of 6,933 consisting of 3,551 males and 3,382 females. There were 854 children ages 0-6.

== Geography ==
Hubli

Climate chart (precipitation, max. and min. temperature)
J	F	M	A	M	J	J	A	S	O	N	D
0 29 15	0 32 16	10 35 19	40 36 21	60 35 21	150 28 21	210 26 21	200 26 20	110 28 20	60 29 19	30 29 17	0 28 15
- █ Average max. and min. temperatures in °C
- █ Precipitation totals in mm
- Source: YR
Imperial conversion
J	F	M	A	M	J	J	A	S	O	N	D
0 85 58	0 89 60	0.4 94 65	1.6 97 69	2.4 94 70	5.9 83 70	8.3 79 70	7.9 78 68	4.3 82 67	2.4 85 66	1.2 84 62	0 83 60
- █ Average max. and min. temperatures in °F
- █ Precipitation totals in inches

The district is bounded on the North by the District of Belgaum, on the East by the district of Gadag, on the South Haveri and on the West by Uttara Kannada district. All these districts which surround Dharwad district belong to Karnataka State itself.

Sub Divisions of District (Taluka's)

- Dharwad
- Hubballi
- Kundgol
- Navalgund
- Kalghatgi

The District lies approximately 800 m above sea level, which is why it enjoys a moderate and healthy climate. The District may be divided into 3 natural regions, viz., the Malnad, Semi-Malnad and Maidan. These regions on an average receive moderate to heavy rainfall and have dense vegetation. Kalghatagi and Alnavar area in Dharwad taluka in particular receive more rainfall than other talukas of the District.

== Transportation ==
- By Road: Easy to reach from Gadag, Navalgund and Ron. State Highway 45 connects Arabhavi with Challakere via Gokak, Naragund, Shalavadi, Sirahatti, Mandaragi, Hadagali, Itagi, Ujjani and Jagalur pass through the village.
- By Railway:Gadag Junction Railway Station Station are the nearest railheads.
- By Air: via Hubli Airport.

== See also ==
- Dharwad
- Districts of Karnataka
