= Kolavi =

- Village
- Interactive map of Kolavi
- Coordinates: 16°05′27.2″N 74°50′21.2″E
- Country: India
- State: Karnataka
- District: Belagavi
- Talukas: Gokak

Languages
  - Official: Kannada
- Time zone: UTC+5:30 (IST)
- Postal code: 591344
- Vehicle registration: KA-49

Kolavi is a village in Gokak taluka and Belagavi district in Karnataka, India.It is located around 12 km from Gokak and 54 km from district headquarter Belagavi. The common language in use is Kannada. The main occupation of the people here is agriculture.
