= Punacha =

- village
- Location in Karnataka, India Punacha (India)
- Coordinates: 12.9°N 75.03°E
- Country: India
- State: Karnataka
- District: Dakshina Kannada
- Talukas: Bantwal

Government
  - Body: Panchayath

Population (2001)
  - Total: 7,878

Languages
  - Official: Kannada
- Time zone: UTC+5:30 (IST)
- PIN: 574243
- Telephone code: 08255
- ISO 3166 code: IN-KA
- Vehicle registration: KA 19
- Nearest city: Puttur
- Lok Sabha constituency: Mangalore
- Vidhan Sabha constituency: Puttur
- Civic agency: Panchayath

Punacha is a village in the southern state of Karnataka, India. It is located in the Bantwal taluk of Dakshina Kannada district in Karnataka.

== Background ==
The name Punacha is derived from the Tulu language word puncha, which is a natural mud habitat (an anthill) where snakes usually live.

Punacha is famous for the Shri Mahishaamardhini temple which is at the heart of the village. Legend has it that, long ago, a tribeswoman accidentally discovered a black Mahishaamardhini (an avatar of Durga) sculpture while she was working in a nearby hill called Devaragudde, 'The Hill of God'. One of the eyes of the sculpture got damaged by her knife without her knowledge. Later, the sculpture was taken to the current site and a temple was built, dedicated to the Goddess.

Before independence, Punacha (which is part of Dakshina Kannada or Canara district) was ruled by the Madras Presidency. After independence this place was included in Mysore state which was later renamed as Karnataka.

== Demographics ==
As of 2011 India census, Punacha village had a population of 7,978 with 4,009 males and 3,969 females. The major languages spoken in the village are Kannada and Tulu along with other languages like Havyaka, Konkani, Marathi and Beary.

== Education ==
In the village, the majority of the population is literate with primary and secondary grade education. The village’s literacy rate is far above national average. Significant number of people from this village work in Indian metropolis like Bangalore, Mumbai, Delhi whereas a sizeable proportion of population work in the Middle East. This place has provided number of engineers, doctors, writers, folk artists, Yakshagaana artists, Politicians, Army jawans, businessmen, teachers, professors, accountants and agriculturists to the country.

Educational facilities till class X is available in Punacha-Pariyalthadka Aided Higher Primary School, Pariyalthadka and Sri Devi High School, Devinagara, with the medium of instruction being Kannada. For higher education, people either commute to neighbouring towns like Puttur, Vittal or Mangalore.

Lists of educational institution in Punacha:

- Punacha Pariyalthadka Aided Higher Primary School, Pariyalthadka.
- Sri Devi High School, Devinagara.
- Ajinadka, Ajeru, Dambe, Toranakatte Govt Schools.
- Hayathul Islam Madrasa Pariyalthadka.
- Sarakari Hiriya Prathamika Shale Moodambailu (Govt School).

== Agriculture ==
The main crops of Punacha village are paddy, coconut, areca nut, jasmine, black pepper, rubber and cocoa. Paddy is generally cultivated during three seasons in a year, Karthika or Yenel (May–October), Suggi (October to January) and Kolake (January to April). There are some farmers who do dairy farming, poultry etc. for their livelihood.

== Religion ==
Inhabitants of Punacha follow either of the three religions like Hinduism, Islam or Christianity. Among Hindus, majority of the people belong to ethnicities like Billava, Brahmin, Bunt, Marathi Naik and Rajapur Saraswat Brahmins ( RSB ).

List of religious places in Punacha:

- Jumma Masjid Punacha
- Shree Mahishamardhini Temple Punacha
- Shree Mahishamardini Bhajana Mandira, Ajeru
- Jumma Masjid & Darga Pariyalthadka
- Christ the King Catholic Church, Kurelu, Manila, Punacha.
- Koti Channaya Garadi – Garodi
- Shree Dhoomavathi Kshetra Bailu Guthu
- Shree Dhoomavathi Kshetra, Sankesha
- Shree Kallurti Daiva, Padavu
- Shree Malaraaya Kshetra, Dalkaje
- Jai bharathi marathi mandira devinagara

== Connectivity ==
=== Air ===
The nearest airport to Punacha is Mangalore International Airport which is at a distance of 58 km. Flights are available to major Indian cities like Delhi, Bangalore, Hyderabad, Chennai, Mumbai and Middle East countries like Abu Dhabi, Bahrain, Dammam, Doha, Dubai–International, Kuwait, Muscat.

=== Railway ===
There is no railway line passing through Punacha. The closest railway station to the village is Kabaka Puttur Railway Station (Station Code: KBPR) which is around 15 km via the fastest road. It is a single track diesel line on the Mangalore-Hassan railway line of South Western Railway.

=== Road ===
Punacha is connected to nearest towns like Puttur and Vittal by private and ksrtc shuttle buses with a frequency of around half an hour. Daily buses are available from 7 am to 8 pm from both the towns. Also there is KSRTC bus facilities from puttur to vitla via punacha.

== Notable persons from Punacha ==
- M.S.Mohammad Manila Former Vice President Jilla Panchayath Dakshina Kannada.
- Agrala Purandara Rai, Writer of Kannada Literature and Journalist ( 1916-2001)
- Prof. B.A. Viveka Rai, former Vice Chancellor of Kannada University, Hampi and Karnataka State Open University, Mysore and Retired Professor and Head, Kannada Department of Mangalore University, A senior writer, scholar of Kannada Literature and Folklore. He is the son of Agrala Purandara Rai, writer and journalist.
- B.A.Ullas Rai, Retired General Manager of Vijaya Bank, son of Agrala Purandara Rai.
- Moodambailu Gopalakrishna Shastry, Yakshagana Tala Maddale artist.
- Late Nayan Kumar, comedy artist in Yakahagaana
- Pulincha Ramayya Shetty, artist in Yakshagaana( 1939-2002)
- S R Rangamoorthy, former Campco President.
- S R Satishchandra, Campco President
- Sachidanada Prabhu, ajeru yakshagana artist
- Pratham Ajeru, yakshagana artist
- Kavyashree Nayak Ajeru, Yakshagana Artist

Health facilities:

Government Primary Health Centre at Ajjinadka

Dr Sumana Moorthi Shastry Clinic Ajjinadka

Dr K M Bhat SWASTIK CLINIC Punacha Pariyalthadka

Dr Pradeep P K Thanvi Clinic Punacha Garadi

== See also ==
- Dakshina Kannada
- Districts of Karnataka
