= Gorebal =

Village in Karnataka, India

Gorebal Gorebala
- Village
- Location within Karnataka Location within India
- Coordinates: 15°41′31.53″N 76°43′15.55″E
- Country: India
- State: Karnataka
- District: Raichur
- Taluk: Sindhnur

Area
  - Total: 11.59 km^{2} (4.47 sq mi)
- Elevation: 402 m (1,319 ft)

Population (2011)
  - Total: 10,514
  - Density: 907.2/km^{2} (2,350/sq mi)

Languages
  - Official: Kannada
- Time zone: UTC+5:30 (IST)
- PIN: 584128
- STD code: 08538
- Vehicle registration: KA-36

Gorebal is a village located 9 km from Sindhanur in the Raichur district of Karnataka state, India. Gorebal is well irrigated with Tunga Bhadra left bank canals 32 (Hanchinal camp) and 36 (Gorebal camp). In 2011, there were 10,514 people living in Gorebal.

== Geography ==
Gorebal is located in the southern part of Raichur district, near the border with Koppal district. The village has an land area of 1158.5 hectares, as well as an average elevation of 402 meters above sea level.

== Demographics ==
According to the 2011 census, Gorebal had 10,514 residents among its 2,230 households, including 5,177 male residents and 5,337 female residents. The village's literacy rate was 57.86%, significantly lower than the state average of 75.36%.

== Transport ==
=== Rail ===
Gorebal has Gorebal railway station(GEBL). It has trains to Sindhanur, Gangavati, Hubballi and Bengaluru.
