= Guttal =

- Town
- Location in Karnataka, India Guttal (India)
- Coordinates: 14°50′N 75°38′E
- Country: India
- State: Karnataka
- District: Haveri
- Talukas: Haveri

Population (2001)
  - Total: 13,198

Languages
  - Official: Kannada
- Time zone: UTC+5:30 (IST)
- Vehicle registration: KA 27
- Nearest city: Ranebennur
- Lok Sabha constituency: Haveri
- Vidhan Sabha constituency: Haveri

Guttal is a town in the southern state of Karnataka, India. It is located in the Haveri taluk of Haveri district in Karnataka.

== Demographics ==
As of 2001 India census, Guttal had a population of 13198 with 6828 males and 6370 females.

== See also ==
- Haveri
- Ranebennur
- Districts of Karnataka
