= Honganoor =

- village
- Location in Karnataka, India Honganoor (India)
- Coordinates: 11.982282°N 77.042392°E
- Country: India
- State: Karnataka
- District: Chamarajanagar
- Talukas: Chamarajanagar

Government
  - Type: Panchayat raj
  - Body: Gram panchayat

Population (2001)
  - Total: 6,757

Languages
  - Official: Kannada
- Time zone: UTC+5:30 (IST)
- ISO 3166 code: IN-KA
- Vehicle registration: KA
- Website: karnataka.gov.in

Honganoor is a village in the southern state of Karnataka, India. It is located in the Chamarajanagar taluk of Chamarajanagar district in Karnataka.

== Demographics ==
As of 2001 India census, Honganoor had a population of 6757 with 3426 males and 3331 females.

== See also ==
- Chamarajanagar
- Districts of Karnataka
