= Ramapura, Chamarajanagar =

Ramapura
- village
- Location in Karnataka, India Ramapura (India)
- Coordinates: 12.15°N 77.10°E
- Country: India
- State: Karnataka
- District: Chamarajanagar
- Talukas: Hanur

Government
  - Body: Gram panchayat

Population (2011)
  - Total: 6,223

Languages
  - Official: Kannada
- Time zone: UTC+5:30 (IST)
- PIN: 571444
- Vehicle registration: KA 10

Ramapura is a village in the southern state of Karnataka, India. It is located in the Hanur taluk of Chamarajanagar district in Karnataka.It is surrounded by Ajjipura, Cowdhalli, Martalli, Hoogya, Kudlur, Ponnachi and Male Mahadeshwara Betta. As per Indian Postal Department, the name of this place is Ramapuram Ghat. Ramapura is very close to the border of Tamil Nadu. It was part of erstwhile Tamil Nadu state. Ramapura is closely surrounded by three more villages viz., Poojaribhovidoddi, Gopishettiyur, Gejjalanatta and Muttushettiyur. Chengadarahalli, Puduramapuram, Palanimedu are other small villages. The Postal PIN code is 571444.

== Legend ==
As per legend, it is believed that Lord Rama visited this place en route Lanka. An ancient, small temple dedicated to Lord Rama can be seen in this village even to this day.

== People ==
Most of the people in Ramapura and surrounding villages are occupied in agriculture. Some of them are in to business. The popular spoken language is Kannada. However, the accent and style of spoken Kannada is unique to this village. A good number of Tamil-speaking people can be found here.

== Educational institutions ==
Among the educations institutions, JSS Institutions have a larger presence. It runs pre-primary school, primary school, high school and Pre-University College. This institution was started in 1960s. It has produced many stalwarts in different walks of life. Apart from JSS, there are good number of schools run by the State Government. In view of good number of Tamil citizens, few Tamil medium schools too can be found here.

== Temples ==
The following temples can be found in and around Ramapura.

1. Rama temple, Ramapura
2. Male Madeshwara Temple, Ramapura
3. Kashipati Gudi, Gopishettiyur
4. Marammana Gudi (deity of village), Gopishettiyur
5. Road Maramma Gudi, (Gopishettiyur-Palanimedu)
6. Kanive Anjaneya (near Ajjipura)
7. Anjaneya (near Palanimedu-Chengadarahalli route)
8. Sri Muthu Mariyamman Temple

(Palanimedu village, Hanur (Tq), M M hills main road).

1. 41 FEET SRI MURUGAN TEMPLE

(Palanimedu village, Hanur (Tq), M M Hills main road).

1. Vangaliyamman Temple(Poojaribhovidoddi).
2. Sri Hucchayya swamy temple(Hucchayya swamy devasthana)

== Places ==
The following sight-seeing places are located near Ramapura.

1. Gejjugutte - a small hillock situated towards southeast of Ramapura. Three big rocks at the peak are the main attraction of this hill.
2. M M hills - popularly known as Male Madeshwara Hills. It is a famous pilgrimage centre in Karnataka. It is located 40 km north of Ramapura. En route M M Hills, there are other sight-seeing places.
3. Kokkubare-kombudikki - A twin valley connected with M M Hills. It houses a rare forest of Kadusampige. It is very difficult to reach this place due to presence of innumerable snakes.
4. Hogenakkal Cauvery Falls - It is on the border of Karnataka and Tamil Nadu
5. Hugyam Dam - it is a dam located near Hugyam village, which is between the forest.
6. Gundapura Dam - it is another dam which is very near to Ramapura . During drought this dam water is used to refill the ponds of the surrounding

villages.

== Demographics ==
As of 2011 India census, Ramapura had a population of 6223 with 3144 males and 3079 females.

== See also ==
- Kollegal
- Chamarajanagar
- Districts of Karnataka
