= Alagawadi =

- Village
- Location in Karnataka, India
- Coordinates: 15°37′32″N 75°17′25″E
- Country: India
- State: Karnataka
- District: Dharwad
- Talukas: Navalgund

Government
  - Type: Panchayat raj
  - Body: Gram panchayat

Population (2011)
  - Total: 5,838

Languages
  - Official: Kannada
- Time zone: UTC+5:30 (IST)
- ISO 3166 code: IN-KA
- Vehicle registration: KA
- Website: karnataka.gov.in

Alagawadi is a village in the southern state of Karnataka, India. It is located in the Navalgund taluk of Dharwad district in Karnataka.

== Demographics ==
As of the 2011 Census of India there were 1,166 households in Alagawadi and a total population of 5,838 consisting of 2,929 males and 2,909 females. There were 732 children ages 0-6.

== See also ==
- Dharwad
- Districts of Karnataka
