= Mustur =

Village in India raichur district davadurga tq in tha village

Coordinates: 13°27′N 77°43′E

- village
- Interactive map of Mustur
- Country: India
- State: Karnataka
- District: Koppal
- Talukas: Gangawati

Government
  - Body: Gram panchayat

Population (2001)
  - Total: 5,216

Languages
  - Official: Kannada
- Time zone: UTC+5:30 (IST)
- ISO 3166 code: IN-KA
- Vehicle registration: KA
- Website: karnataka.gov.in

Mustur is a village in the southern state of Karnataka, India. It is located in the Gangawati taluk of Koppal district in Karnataka.

== Demographics ==
As of 2001 India census, Mustur had a population of 5216 with 2581 males and 2635 females.

== See also ==
- Koppal
- Districts of Karnataka
