= Ravoor =

- village
- Country: India
- State: Karnataka
- District: Kalaburagi
- Talukas: Shahabad

Population (2001)
  - Total: 10,444

Languages
  - Official: Kannada
- Time zone: UTC+5:30 (IST)

Ravoor is a village in the state of Karnataka, India. It is located in the Shahabad taluk of Kalaburagi district in Karnataka.

== Demographics ==
As of 2001 India census, Ravoor had a population of 10444 with 5375 males and 5069 females.

== See also ==
- Gulbarga
- Districts of Karnataka
