= Magundi =

- Village
- Location in Karnataka, India Magundi (India)
- Coordinates: 13.27°N 75.48°E
- Country: India
- State: Karnataka
- District: Chikkamagaluru
- Taluk: Narasimharajapura
- Time zone: UTC+5:30 (IST)
- PIN: 577160
- Area Code: 08266
- Vehicle registration: KA-18
- Official languages: Kannada, Tulu

Magundi is a Gram panchayat in Narasimharajapura Taluk, Chikkamagaluru District of Karnataka State. This place is a junction for the Horanadu, Dharmastala, Kottigehara and Sringeri routes.
