= Shamanewadi =

chikodi
- Village
- Location in Karnataka, India chikodi (India)
- Coordinates: 16.540346°N 74.497435°E
- Country: India
- State: Karnataka
- District: Belgaum
- Talukas: Chikodi

Population (2001)
  - Total: 5,988

Languages
  - Official: Kannada
- Time zone: UTC+5:30 (IST)
- PIN: 591201
- Telephone code: 08338
- Vehicle registration: KA 23
- Nearest city: Ichalakaranji
- Lok Sabha constituency: Chikodi
- Vidhan Sabha constituency: Chikodi-Sadalga

Chikodi is a village in the southern state of Karnataka in Chikodi taluka, India. It is in the Chikodi taluk of Belgaum district in Karnataka.

== Demographics ==
As of 2001 India census, Shamanewadi had a population of 5,988 with 3,060 males and 2,928 females. More than 90% are from Jain community along with Lingaayats and other communities. Most of the people depend on agriculture, it consists of rich sugar belt, as farming is a major activity of the area. The main crops are sugar cane, tobacco, jawar, and soyabeans. Almost on the bank of river Dudhganga. There are some groups in the village like Gandhi Katti boys, Jai Karnataka Yuval mandal, Jai Hind group, they participate in social works/festival, etc.

Its schools of higher education include Ayurvedic College, BEd, DEd and Arts and Commerce colleges in Shantinagar area.

- Banks and Financial Societies
  - State Bank of India
  - The Ratnakar Bank
  - Jai Jinendra Co-Op Credit Souhard Ltd
  - Padmavati Minority Multipurpose Society
  - Parshwanath Co-Op Credit Souhard Ltd
  - Shamanewadi Co-Op Credit Souhard Ltd

== Transportation ==
- Road

Shamanewadi is well connected by road via the State Highway 97 Sankeshwar - Sadalga and Chikkodi - Ichalakaranji road. NWKRTC run buses from Chikodi, Nippani to Ichalkaranji (Maharashtra) and Sadalga stops at Shamanewadi. Rent on taxi and autos available here.

- Nearest Railway Station

Miraj

- Nearest Airport

Belagavi

== Places ==
=== Temples ===
- Shri Ramlingeshwar Temple
- 1008 Chandraprabhu Digambar Jain Temple
- Beereshwar Temple
- Mallayya Temple
- Brahmanath Temple
- Yellamma Temple
- Margubai Temple
- Hanuman Temple
- Vekteshwar Temple
- Shamanameer Darga
- padmavati Temple
- Somanatah Temple

== See also ==
- Belgaum
- Chikodi
- Districts of Karnataka
