= Abbigere =

- village
- Abbigere is in Bangalore district

- Location in Karnataka, India Abbigere (India)
- Coordinates: 13°4′36″N 77°31′30″E
- Country: India
- State: Karnataka
- District: Bangalore
- Talukas: Bangalore North

Government
  - Body: Village, BBMP

Population (2007)
  - Total: 100,000

Languages
  - Official: Kannada
- Time zone: UTC+5:30 (IST)
- PIN: 560 090
- Tumkur: Bangalore
- Sex ratio: 42/33. ♂/♀
- Civic agency: Village BBMP

Abbigere is a village in the southern state of Karnataka, India. It is located in the Bangalore North taluk of Bangalore district in Karnataka.
