= Mylara Lingeshwara Temple =

Hindu temple in Mylara

Mylara Mailara
- Village
- Location in Karnataka, India
- Coordinates: 14°48′29″N 75°41′27″E
- Country: India
- State: Karnataka
- District: Vijayanagara
- Taluk: Hoovina Hadagali
- Lok Sabha Constituency: Bellary

Government
  - Type: Panchayat raj
  - Body: Gram panchayat

Languages
  - Official: Kannada
- Time zone: UTC+5:30 (IST)
- ISO 3166 code: IN-KA
- Vehicle registration: KA 34
- Nearest city: Hadagali, Vijayanagara
- Website: karnataka.gov.in

Mylara Lingeshwara Temple is a Hindu temple dedicated to a form of the Hindu god Shiva in Mylara, in the southwest of Hoovina Hadagali taluk, Vijayanagara district, Karnataka, India, 2 km from the Tungabhadra River.

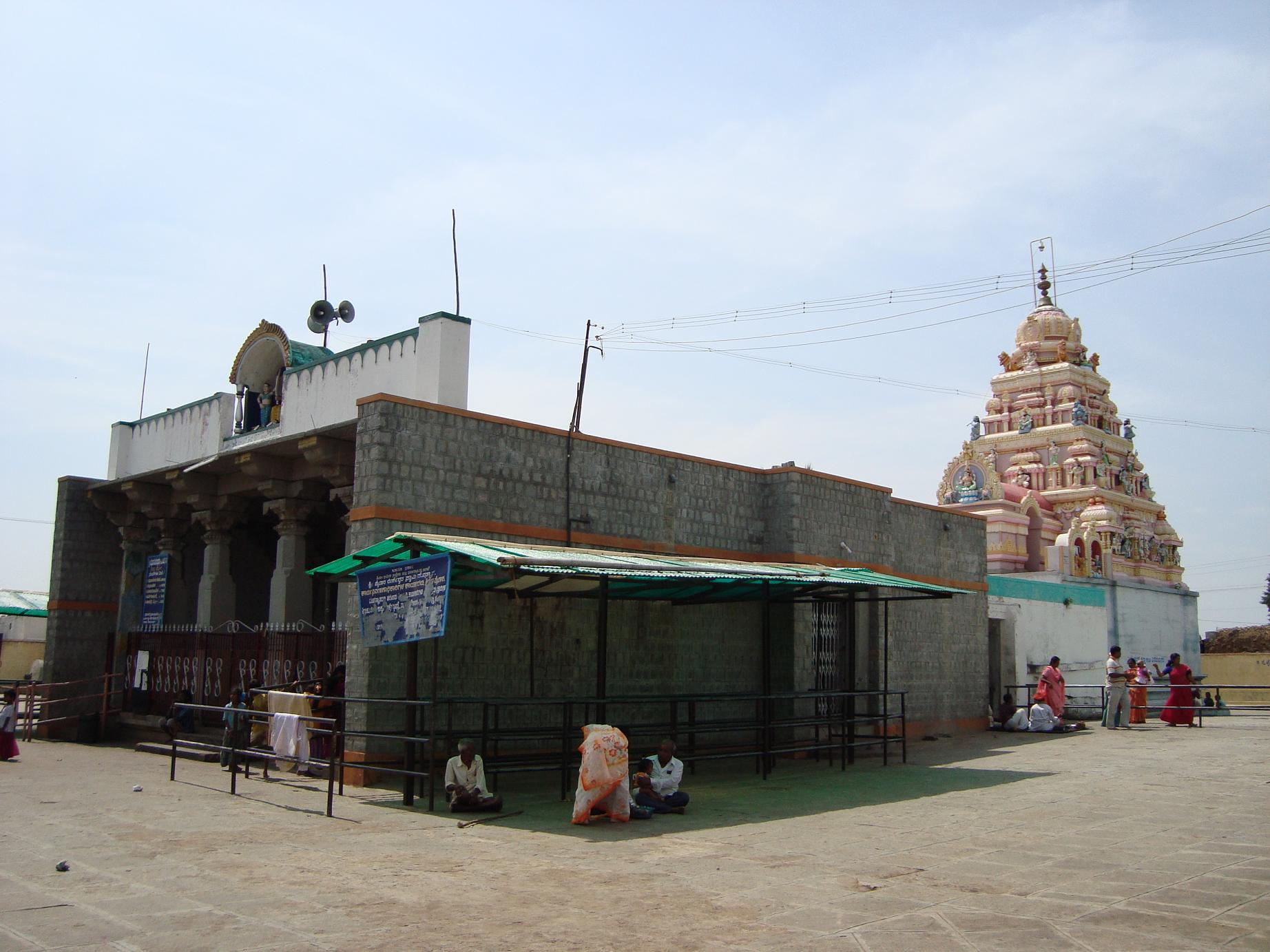
The temple in 2008

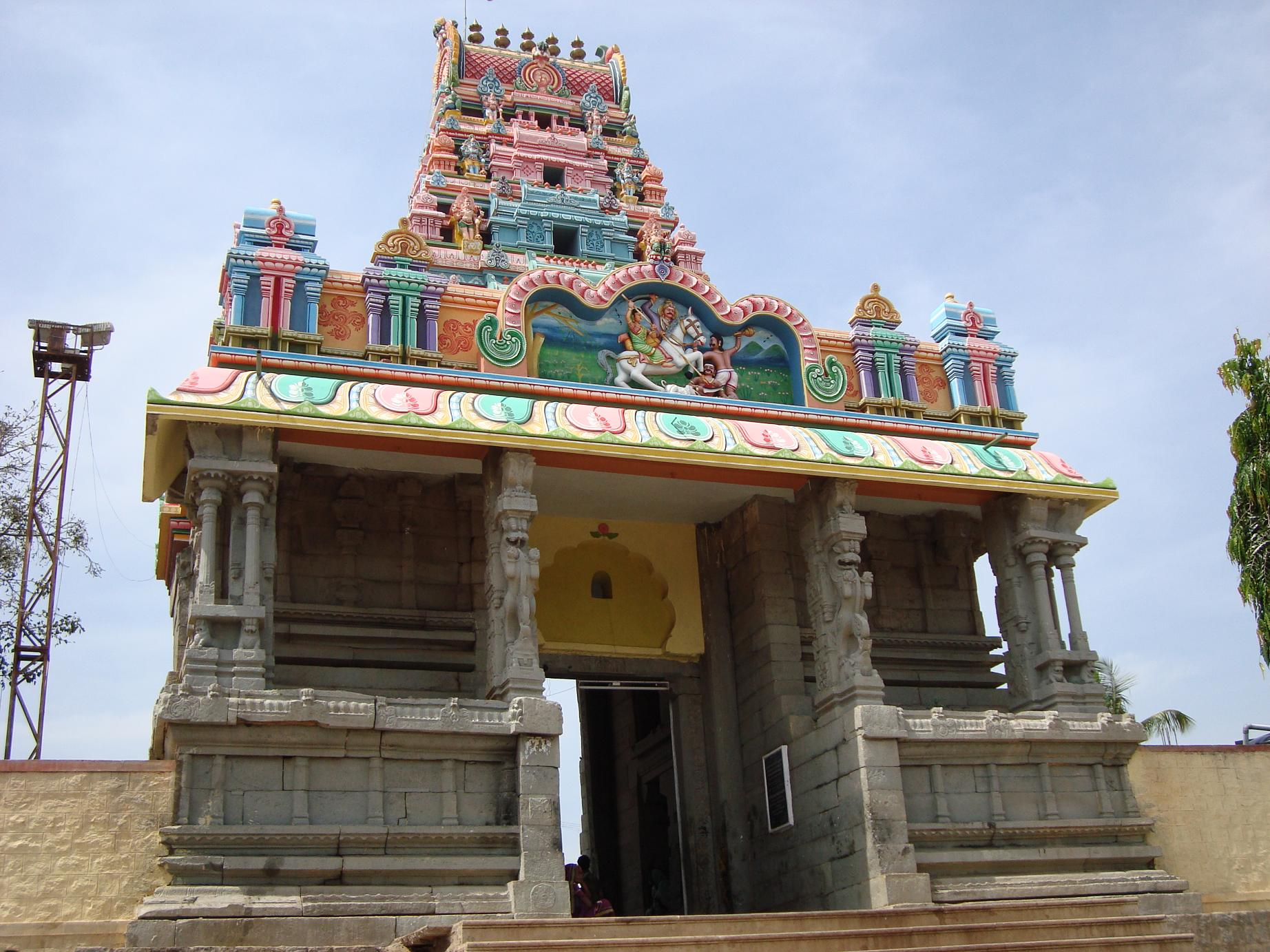
The temple in 2008
