= Mundgod =

Town in Karnataka

- Town
- Location in Karnataka, India
- Coordinates: 14.97°N 75.03°E
- Country: India
- State: Karnataka
- Region: Malenadu
- District: Uttara Kannada

Area
  - Total: 11.99 km^{2} (4.63 sq mi)
- Elevation: 564 m (1,850 ft)

Population (2011)
  - Total: 18,866
  - Density: 1,573/km^{2} (4,075/sq mi)

Languages
  - Official: Kannada
- Time zone: UTC+5:30 (IST)
- Vehicle registration: KA 31 Sirsi
- Website: mundagodtown.mrc.gov.in

Mundgod or Mundagodu is a town in Uttara Kannada district of Karnataka state in India, Mundgod is renowned for its extensive cultivation of rice.

== Characteristics ==
it is bounded by Maje-Pur village in the north, Malagankoppa village in the south, Kyasanakeri village in the west, Kundergi and Nesargi village in the east. The Mundgod town is characterized by paddy fields. The land on either side of the Hubli-Sirsi road is very much suitable for development. To the northeast the town is surrounded by forest. It is suitable at an altitude of 564 m above the mean sea level.

The climate of Mundgod is moderate except during the rainy season. Mundgod Town Panchayath has been divided into 16 wards and from each ward there will be representative of people. Latest council came into force on 18-02-2008. There are 16 elected members. Town limit is 11.99 km^{2} with population of 18,866 according to 2011 census. The number of residential houses remunerated by the town Panchayath is 5223. The main occupation of the people of Mundgod town is agriculture. Rice is the major crop.

== Demographics ==
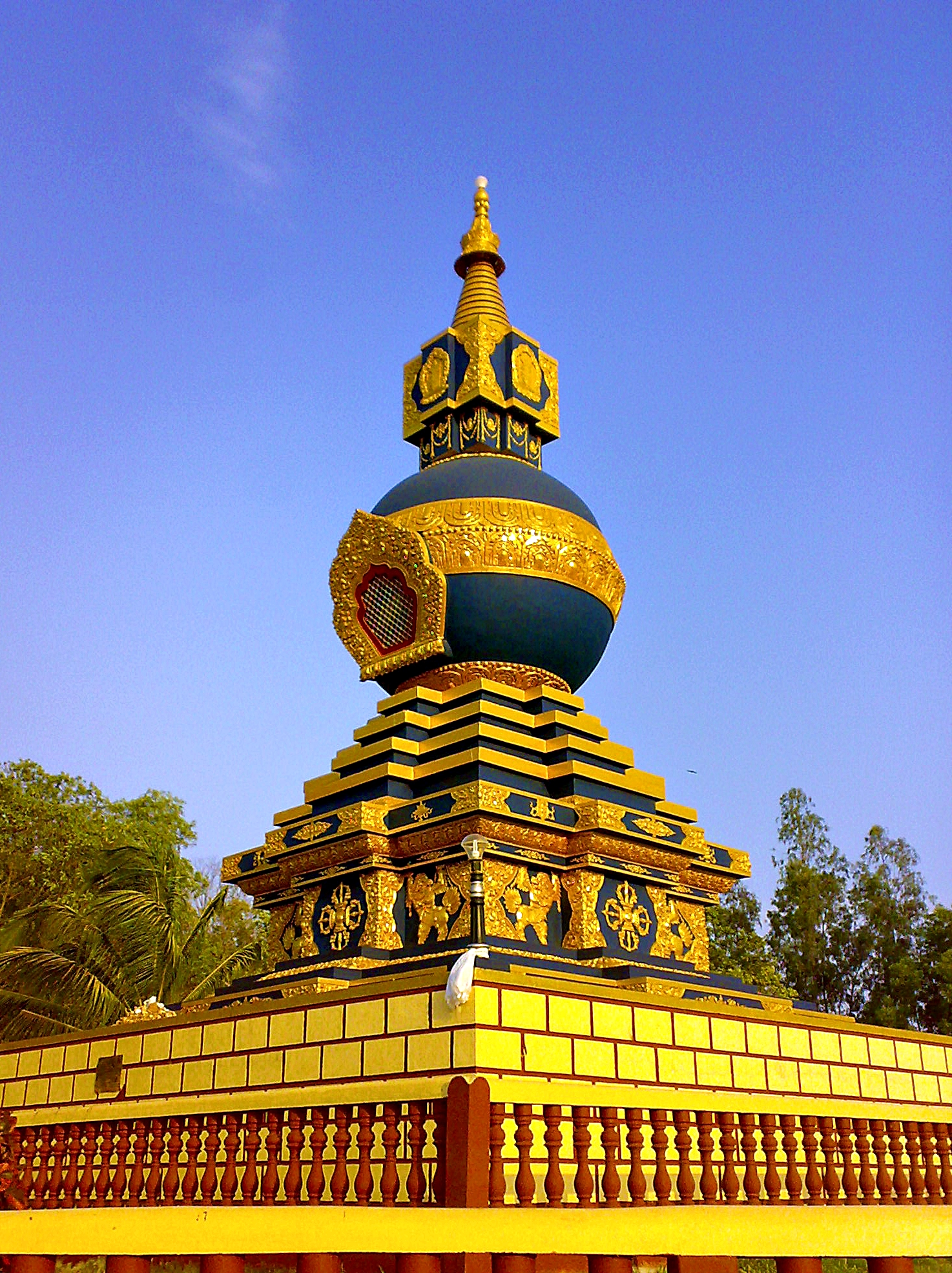
Tibetan Buddhist Chorten in Mundgod, India

As of 2001 India census, Mundgod had a population of 16,171. Males constitute 51% of the population and females 49%. Mundgod has an average literacy rate of 67%, higher than the national average of 59.5%: male literacy is 73%, and female literacy is 62%. In Mundgod, 15% of the population is under 6 years of age.

With the help of the Government of India, the Tibetan administration, in the early 1960s, proposed to start a number of settlements for the Tibetan refugees. Tibetan settlement in Mundgod is one of them. Government of India in consultation with the state Government of Karnataka agreed to provide 4,000 acres (16 km^{2}) of mostly forestland near Taluk village in North Kanara district 1900 feet (580 m) above sea level. The settlers were provided tents and bamboo huts for temporary shelter in the beginning. All the work in the settlement was done on co-operative basis and settlers were provided free dry ration. Doeguling Tibetan Settlement in Mundgod was established in 1966.

== Geography ==
Map of Mundgod Taluk

Mundgod is located at 14.97°N 75.03°E. It has an average elevation of 567 metres (1,860 ft).

== Tourist attractions of Mundgod region ==
- Bedsgav Village

The Bedsgav Village has a chalukyan temple, built Bijjaladeva in 1163 AD. The temple has beautifully carved pillars with ornamental designs. There are also many hero stones in the village, with a particular stone dated from the 12th century talks about a warrior called Kuppugauga who perished in battle.

- Tibetan colony Mundgod

Mundgod is a repository of Tibetan life and culture. It showcases the lifestyle and ambitions of the Tibetan refugees and reflects the gradual transformation of a traditional society into modernity. It has been referred to as Mini Tibet.

- Bachanaki Dam

It is about 6 km from Mundgod and 7 km from Attiveri Bird Sanctuary.

- Attiveri Bird Sanctuary

Attiveri Bird Sanctuary is around 15 km from Mundgod in Uttara Kannada District of Karnataka. From Hubli-Dharwad it is 43 km away.

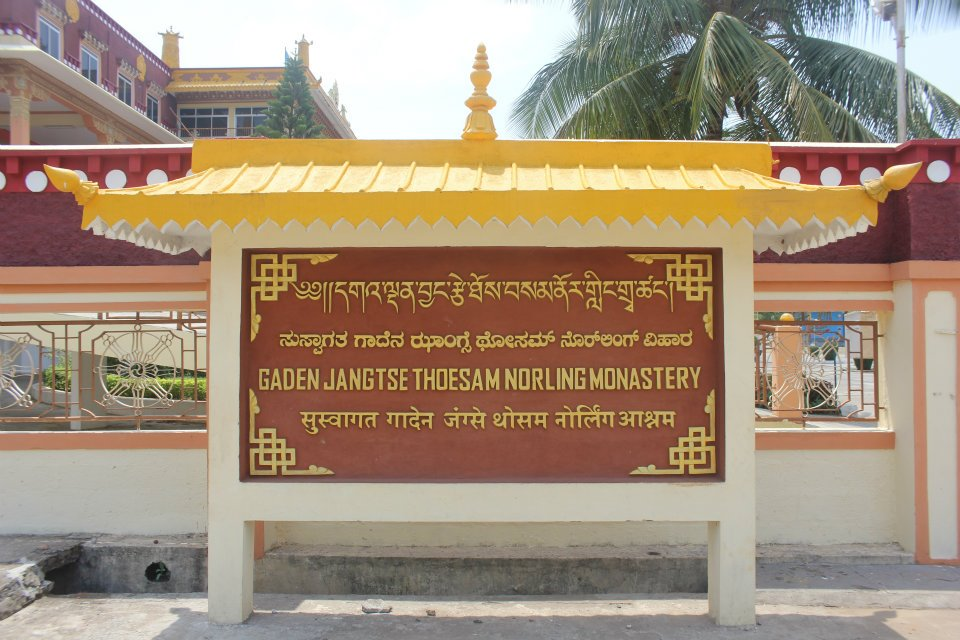
Gaden Jangtse Thoesam Norling Monastery - Tibetan Colony Mundgod

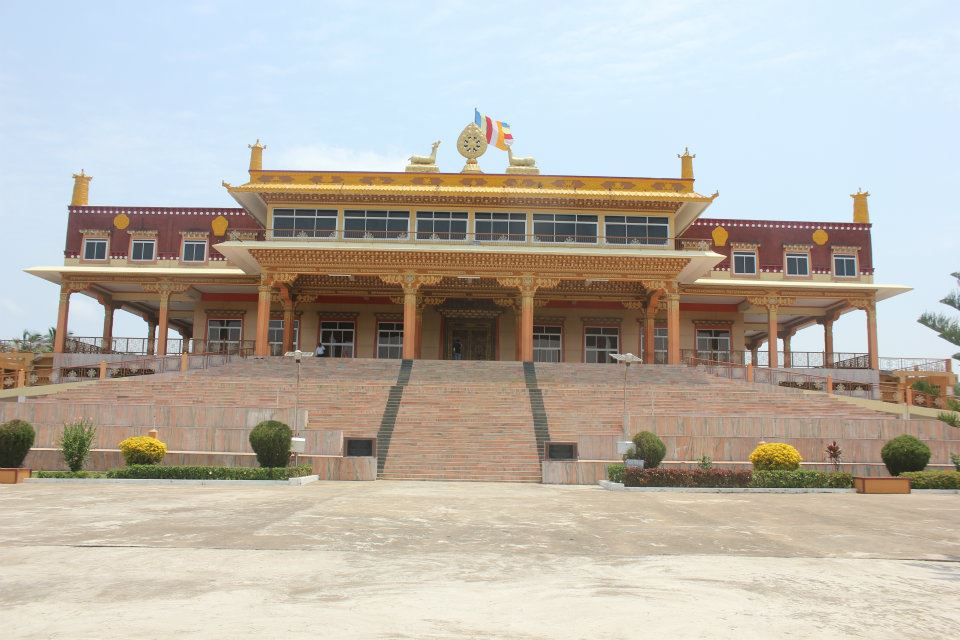
Gaden Jangtse Thoesam Norling Monastery, Tibetan Colony Mundgod

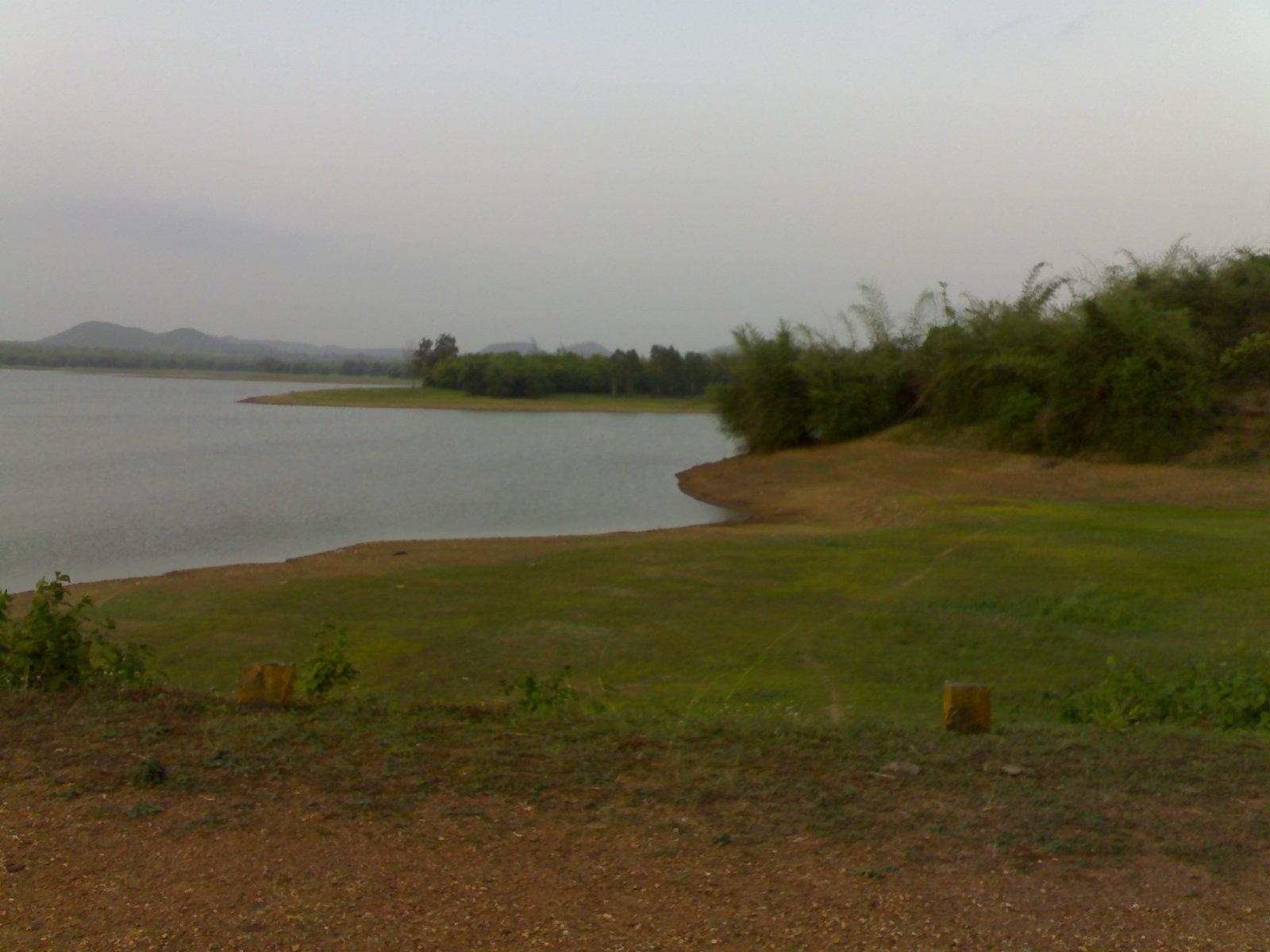
Bachanaki Dam between Mundgod and Attivery Bird sanctuary

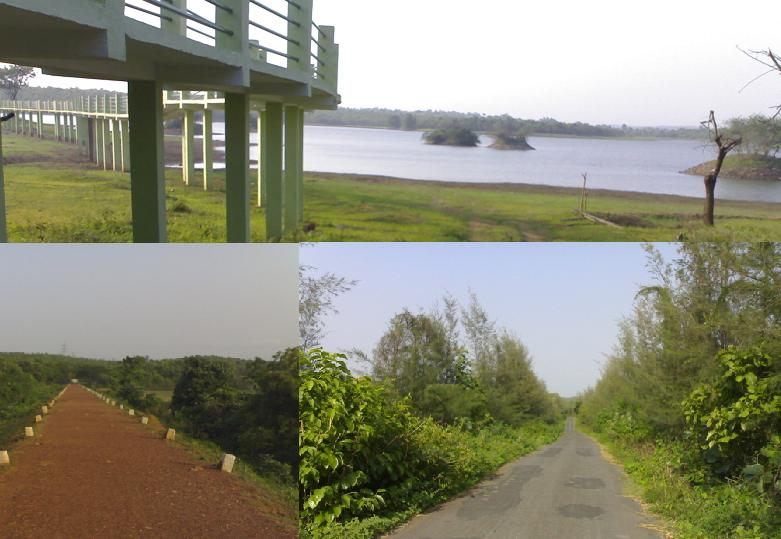
Attivery Bird sanctuary
