= National Highway 648 (India) =

National highway in India

National Highway 648
- Map of National Highway 648 in red

Route information
- Length: 143 km (89 mi)

Major junctions
- From: Dobbaspet
- To: Hosur

Location
- Country: India
- States: Karnataka, Tamil Nadu
- Primary destinations: Doddaballapur – Devanahalli – Sarjapura – Bagalur

Highway system
- Roads in India; Expressways; National; State; Asian
← NH 647	→ NH 652

National Highway 648 (NH 648) is a National Highway in India and along with the NH948A constitutes the Satellite Town Ring Road of Bengaluru.
