= Terakanambi =

- village
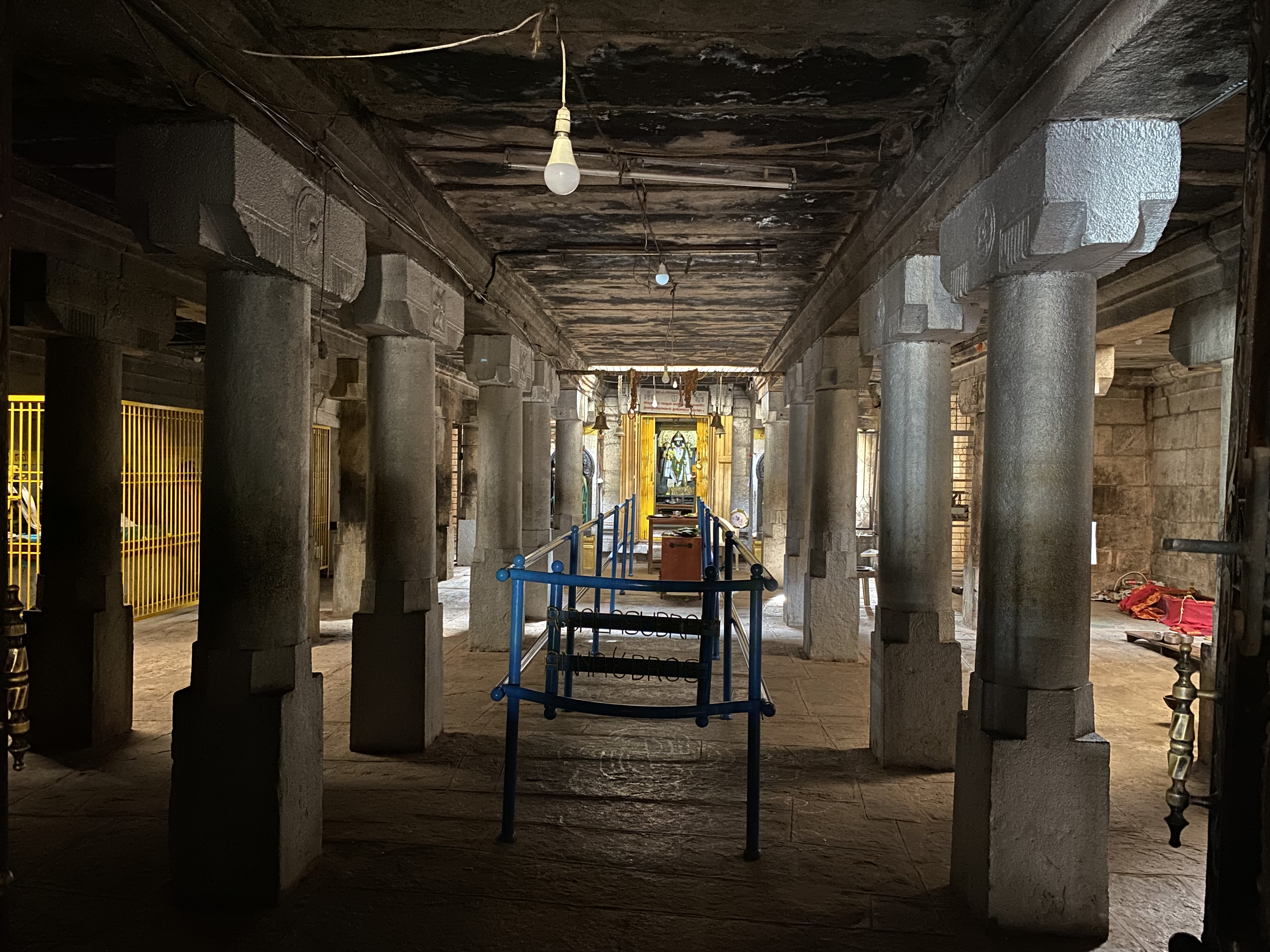
- Terakanambi Lakshmi Varadaraja Swami temple, Gundlupet

- Location in Karnataka, India Terakanambi (India)
- Coordinates: 11.80°N 76.69°E
- Country: India
- State: Karnataka
- District: Chamarajanagar
- Talukas: Gundlupet

Government
  - Body: Gram panchayat

Population (2001)
  - Total: 7,738

Languages kannada
  - Official: Kannada
- Time zone: UTC+5:30 (IST)
- PIN: 571123
- Telephone code: 08229
- ISO 3166 code: IN-KA
- Lok Sabha constituency: Chamarajanagar
- Vidhan Sabha constituency: Gundlupet

Terakanambi is a village in the southern state of Karnataka, India. It is located in the Gundlupet taluk of Chamarajanagar district in Karnataka. Terakanambi has historical temples of Lakshmi Varadaraja Swamy, Triyambakapura, Hulugana Muradi Venkataramana Swamy, Hande Gopalaswamy and many more, and was the pre-coronation home of Kanthirava Narasaraja I a.k.a. Ranadhira Narasaraja (reigned 1638–1659).

== Demographics ==
As of 2001 India census, Terakanambi had a population of 7,738 with 3,898 males and 3,840 females.

== See also ==
- Chamarajanagar
- Districts of Karnataka
