= Nesargi =

- Village
- Location in Karnataka, India Nesargi (India)
- Coordinates: 15.906932°N 74.773964°E
- Country: India
- State: Karnataka
- District: Belgavi

Languages
  - Official: Kannada
- Time zone: UTC+5:30 (IST)

Nesargi is a village in Belagavi district of Karnataka.
