= Kampli =

- Town
- Nickname: Vijayanagarada tavarooru
- Location in Karnataka, India
- Coordinates: 15.407°N 76.61°E
- Country: India
- State: Karnataka
- District: Bellary
- Founded by: kampilaraya
- Elevation: 414 m (1,358 ft)

Population (2011)
  - Total: 39,307

Languages
  - Official: Kannada
- Time zone: UTC+5:30 (IST)
- Postal code: 583132
- Vehicle registration: KA 34
- Website: www.kamplitown.gov.in

Kampli is a town in the Bellary district, Kampli taluk, in the Indian state of Karnataka. It is a headquarters of Kampli Taluk. The town is situated about 15 km away from Hampi.

== Administration ==
Kampli is administered by a town municipal council.

== Economy ==
Kampli is an economic hub for its surrounding villages. Every Tuesday vendors of various commodities assemble at the town's market. Kampli has nearly 20 rice mills and agriculture is the primary economic activity. The Tungabhadra River is a source of irrigation for most of Kampli's agricultural land. The major local crops are paddy, sugar cane, banana and coconuts.

== Education ==
Kampli has many educational institutions ranging from kindergarten to Degree colleges. The town also has couple of primary schools and high schools, specifically for girls. Some of the noted schools and colleges are: Govt First Grade College, Shamiachand Junior(S.M.G.J.) College, Kalmat High School, Govt Girls High School, Bharatiya Shishu Vidhyalaya (B.S.V), Govt primary schools, Govt Urdu school, Vidya Sagara Residential School, Sharadha Vidya Niketan, Vidyasagar, Bright way public school, Vasavi Kannada Higher Primary School, Vijayanagara primary and high school, Chetana School, Govt polytechnic college, shanthi vidyaniketha school, Srimathi Odso jademma primary, high school, PU college and ITI, Vidyaranya ITI college and Pragathi ITI and JTS (Junior Technical School), Keonics computer institution.

== Politics ==
With the delimitation of constituencies by the Delimitation commission, Kampli has been conferred an assembly constituency status. In the Karnataka state assembly elections, 2018, the Congress Party candidate won the election MR J N Ganesh is the current MLA. And In the Town Municipal Elections the bjp party candidate Shahtala V Vidyadhar is the current municipal chairman.

== Geography ==
Kampli is located at: 15.4°N 76.62°E. It has an average elevation of 414 metres (1358 feet).

== Demographics ==
As of 2011 India census, Kampli had a population of 39,307. Males constitute 50% of the population and females 50%. Kampli has an average literacy rate of 55%, lower than the national average of 59.5%: male literacy is 65%, and female literacy is 46%. In Kampli, 13% of the population is under 6 years of age. Kampli has spread around 16,363,627,77 squarefeets. It is a developing town,

== Transport ==
Kampli is well connected by road to Gangavathi, Hospet, Siruguppa, Kurugodu and Bellary. Kalyana Karnataka Road Transport Corporation (KKRTC) runs a bus service to other cities and villages. There are also various private bus services.

Hosapete Junction railway station (32Km) and Gangavathi (10Km) are the nearest railway stations to Kampli.

Nearest domestic airport is Vidya Nagar airport, Jindal (50 Kms), Hubballi Airport (185 km). Rajiv Gandhi international airport, Hyderabad and Kempegowda International airport, Bengaluru are equidistant from Kampli (335kms).

== See also ==
- Hampi
- Hirebenkal
- Anegundi
- Hospet
- Bellary
- Gangavathi
- Koppal
