= Tadas =

- City
- Location in Karnataka, India Tadas (India)
- Coordinates: 15°08′N 75°07′E
- Country: India
- State: Karnataka
- District: Haveri
- Named for: Tadas
- Talukas: Shiggaon

Government
  - Type: Village panchayat Tadas
  - Body: Govt Of Karnataka

Population (2010)
  - Total: 20,000

Languages
  - Official: Kannada
- Time zone: UTC+5:30 (IST)
- Postal code: 581212
- Vehicle registration: KA27

Tadas is a village in the south-western state of Karnataka, 28 km from Hubli and 20 km from Mundgod, India. It is located in the Shiggaon Taluk of Haveri district in Karnataka. Fighting For Taluk Level Headquarters.

== Information ==
Tadas Village is the largest village in the Shiggoan Taluk, with a population of more than 20,000 as of the 2011 census. Two state highways, Sh69 and Sh1, pass through Tadas.

== See also ==
- Haveri
- Districts of Karnataka
