= Bagalur, Bengaluru Urban district =

Bagalur
- Village
- Nickname: Chakalate Bagalur
- Location in Karnataka, India
- Coordinates: 13.133°N 77.666°E
- Country: India
- State: Karnataka
- District: Bangalore Urban district

Government
  - Type: Grama Panchayat

Population (2001)
  - Total: 7,519

Languages
  - Official: Kannada
- Time zone: UTC+5:30 (IST)
- Postal code: 562149
- ISO 3166 code: IN-KA
- Vehicle registration: KA
- Website: karnataka.gov.in

Bagalur is a village in the southern state of Karnataka, India. It is located in the Bangalore Urban district of Karnataka.

== Demographics ==
As of 2001 India census, Bagalur had a population of 7519 with 3852 males and 3667 females.
