= Jagalur =

Jagaluru
- Town
- Location in Karnataka, India
- Coordinates: 14.53°N 76.35°E
- Country: India
- State: Karnataka
- District: Davanagere
- Legislative Assembly Member(MLA): Devendrappa
- Elevation: 668 m (2,192 ft)

Population (2001)
  - Total: 14,741

Languages
  - Official: Kannada
- Time zone: UTC+5:30 (IST)
- ISO 3166 code: IN-KA
- Vehicle registration: KA-17
- Website: www.jagaluru.com

Jagaluru is a panchayat town in Davanagere district in the Indian state of Karnataka.

== Geography ==
Jagaluru is located at 14.53°N 76.35°E. It has an average elevation of 668 metres (2191 feet). Rangayyanadurga forest of this taluk is a house for four horned-antelope an endangered species in India.People say that Jagalur has got its name by a sage named Jagalurajja
