= Soraba =

- Taluk
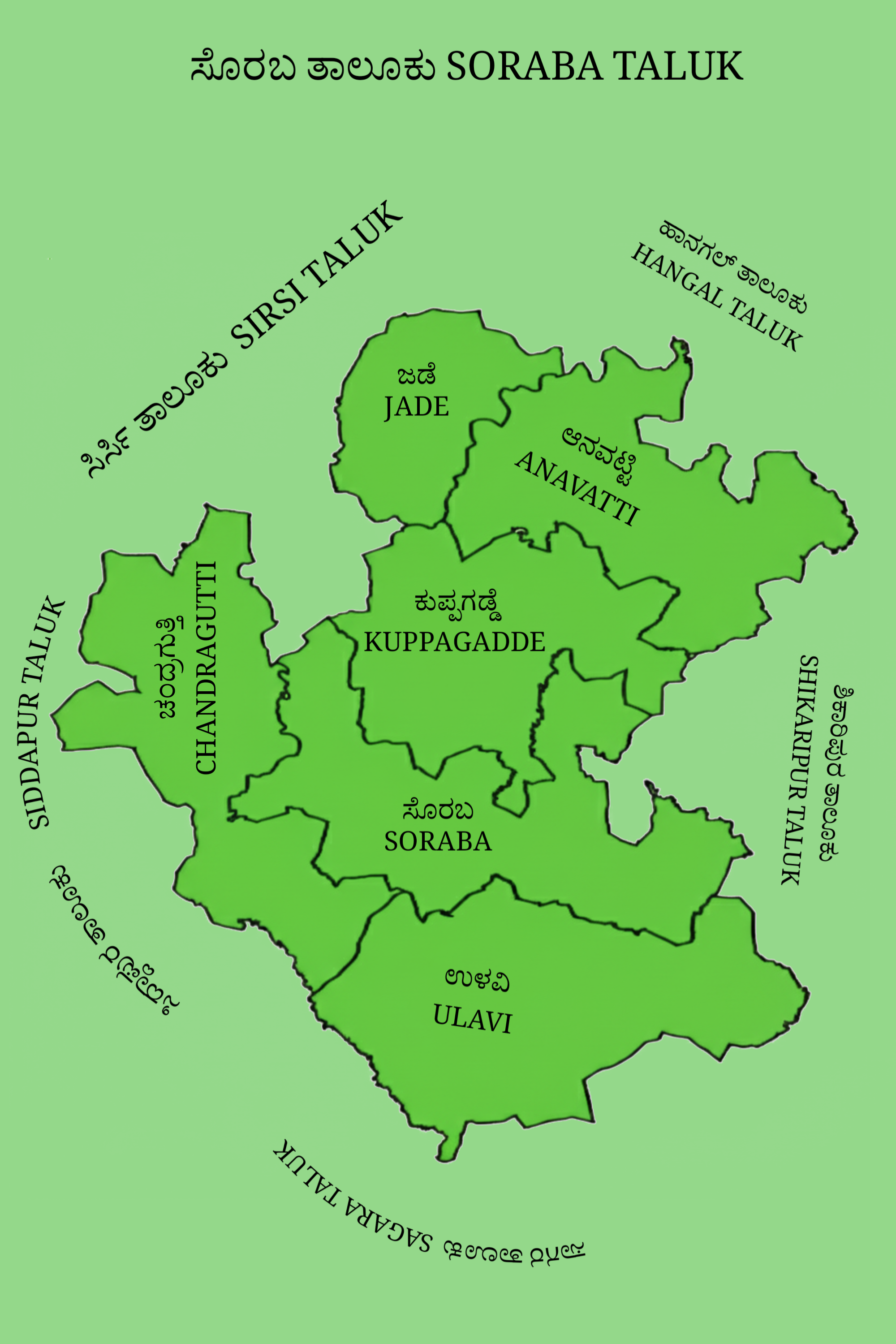
- Soraba Taluk

- Location in Karnataka, India
- Coordinates: 14.38°N 75.1°E
- Country: India
- State: Karnataka
- District: Shivamogga

Government
  - Body: Taluk panchayat
- Elevation: 580 m (1,900 ft)

Population (2011)
  - Total: 200,809

Languages
  - Official: Kannada
- Time zone: UTC+5:30 (IST)
- Area code: 08184
- Vehicle registration: KA-15 (Sagara RTO)

Soraba is a taluk in Shivamogga district in the state of Karnataka in India. Soraba is the major town and commercial centre in Soraba taluk.

Soraba is located at 14.38°N 75.1°E. It has an average elevation of 580 metres (1902 feet).

== Demographics ==
As of 2011 India census, Soraba Taluka of Shivamogga district has total population of 200,809 as per the Census 2011. Out of which 101,130 are males while 99,679 are females. In 2011 there were total 46,658 families residing in Sorab Taluka. The Average Sex Ratio of Sorab Taluka is 986.
