= Koppa, India =

Town in Chikkamagaluru, Karnataka, India

Koppa
- Town
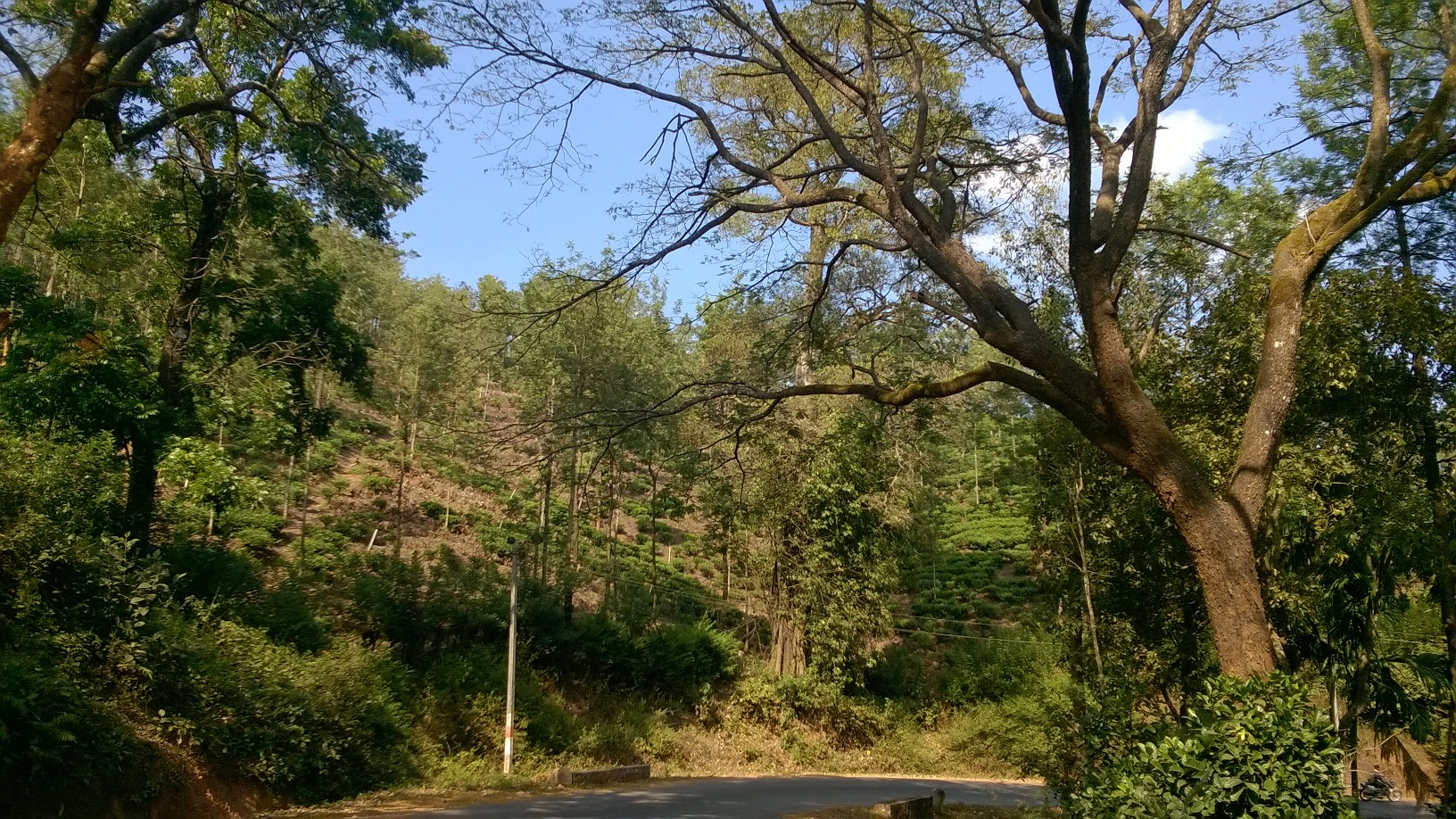
- Summer view of a tea estate near Koppa

- Location in Karnataka, India
- Coordinates: 13.53°N 75.36°E
- Country: India
- State: Karnataka
- District: Chikkamagaluru
- Region: Malenadu

Government
  - Body: Town Panchayath

Area
  - Town: 2 km^{2} (0.77 sq mi)
  - Rural: 570 km^{2} (220 sq mi)
- Elevation: 789 m (2,589 ft)

Population (2011)
  - Town: 4,993
  - Density: 2,500/km^{2} (6,500/sq mi)
  - Rural: 79,889

Languages
  - Official: Kannada
- Time zone: UTC+5:30 (IST)
- PIN: 577126
- Vehicle registration: KA-18 KA-66
- Website: http://www.koppatown.mrc.gov.in

Koppa is a panchayat town in Chikkamagaluru district in the Indian state of Karnataka. It is the headquarters of Koppa sub-district. The name "Koppa" is derived from the Kopada Veerabadra Swamy Temple, a historic site that attracts devotees from the Malnad region.

== Demographics ==
As of 2011 India census, Koppa town had a population of 4,993, with males constituting 49.2% and females 50.8%. The entire Koppa Taluka had a population of 84,882. The average literacy rate in Koppa was 86.4%, higher than the national average of 74.04%. Male literacy was 88%, while female literacy was 84.8%. Additionally, 8.9% of the population in Koppa was under 6 years of age.

== Transport ==
Koppa is connected by road to cities like Shivamogga, Chikmagalur and Udupi. The National Highway 169 connects Koppa with Shivamogga and Mangaluru via Mala Ghat. The nearest railway stations are Bhadravati (70 km)(for Mysuru & Bengaluru connectivity) and Udupi (87 km)(for Mumbai & Kochi connectivity).

The nearest international airport is Mangalore International Airport (129 km). The nearest domestic airport is Shivamogga Airport.

== Geography ==
Koppa is situated in the northern part of Chikkamagaluru district, around 85 km from its district headquarter. Major highways passing through the town are NH-169 and SH-65.

=== Rainfall ===
Koppa is situated in the Malnad region with significant elevation (around 800 metres (2,600 ft)) and receives copious amount of rainfall from the southwest monsoon winds.

As per Karnataka State Natural Disaster Monitoring Center, Bengaluru, in the year 2024, Koppa hobli received 3,973.2 millimetres (156.43 in) of annual rainfall. It was a +37% departure from normal rainfall.

The rainfall received here, eventually feeds the Tunga River.

== Education ==
- Sri Aroor Laxminarayana Rao Memorial Ayurvedic Medical College and Hospital, Koppa was established in 1987.
- Government First Grade College, Balagadi, offers UG and PG courses. It is affiliated to Kuvempu University.
- Government Polytechnic college and Government ITI college was established on the outskirts of Koppa town.
- Koppa has many schools and Pre-university colleges such as St Nobert, BGS, St Joseph, Government PU college etc.

== Economy ==
Agriculture is the primary occupation in Koppa. Major crops include betel nut (areca), coffee, banana, paddy, and pepper. The area also has numerous tea estates.
