= Yellapur =

Town in Karnataka

Yellapura
- town
- Location in Karnataka, India Yellapura (India)
- Coordinates: 14.97°N 74.72°E
- Country: India
- State: Karnataka
- Region: Malenadu
- District: Uttara Kannada

Government
  - Body: Town Panchayat

Area
  - Total: 4.3 km^{2} (1.7 sq mi)
- Elevation: 541 m (1,775 ft)

Population (2011)
  - Total: 20,452
  - Density: 4,800/km^{2} (12,000/sq mi)

Languages
  - Official: Kannada
- Time zone: UTC+5:30 (IST)
- ISO 3166 code: IN-KA
- Vehicle registration: KA 31 Sirsi
- Website: yellapuratown.mrc.gov.in

Yellāpura or Yallāpura is a town, taluka in the Uttara Kannada district of Karnataka, India. The region is known for Arecanut cultivation.

== Geography ==
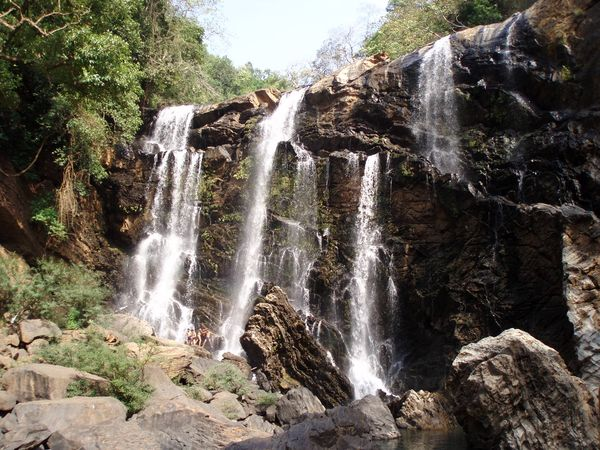
Satoddi Falls

Map of Yellapur Taluk

Yellapur is located in the Western Ghats region of Karnataka. It has an average elevation of 541 metres (1774 feet). Among many other hills and valleys, there are two well-known natural falls near Yellapur: Satoddi Falls, 25 km away from the town, and Magod Falls, 19 km away from Yellapur, in the village of Magodu. 17 km from Yellapur is Jenukallu Gudda (Honey-Stone Hill), a viewpoint with a panoramic view of the Western Ghats.

== Demographics ==
According to the 2001 Indian census, Yellapur had a population of 17,938, 51% male and 49% female. Yellapur has an average literacy rate of 73%, higher than the national average of 59.5%: male literacy is 79%, and female literacy is 68%. 12% of the population of Yellapur is under six years of age. Kannada is the dominant language. Members of an African tribe have lived in the town for several centuries.

== Transport ==
Regular buses run between Yellapur and many other locations in Karnataka. The nearest major station is Alnavar Junction, roughly 60 km away. The nearest airport is Hubli Airport, 80 km away. Yellapura lies on national highway-52 (old NH-63) which connects to Hubballi city and Ankola town. Also there are Karnataka state highway roads which connect Yellapura to Mundgod (SH-6) and Haliyal (SH-93) towns.

== See also ==
- Sirsi, Karnataka
- Sirsi Marikamba Temple
- Yana, India
- National Highway 52 (India)
