= Molakalmuru =

- Taluk
- Location in Karnataka, India
- Coordinates: 14.737°N 76.704°E
- Country: India
- State: Karnataka
- District: Chitradurga

Government
  - Body: Town Panchayat

Area
  - Total: 13 km^{2} (5.0 sq mi)
- Elevation: 619 m (2,031 ft)

Population (2011)
  - Total: 15,797
  - Density: 328.25/km^{2} (850.2/sq mi)

Languages
  - Official: Kannada
- Time zone: UTC+5:30 (IST)
- PIN: 577535
- Telephone code: +918198
- Vehicle registration: KA-16
- Website: www.molakalmurutown.mrc.gov.in/en/

Molakalmuru is a taluk in Chitradurga district in the Indian state of Karnataka. It is near the border of Karnataka and Andhra Pradesh. It borders the Rayadurg taluk of Ananthpur district of Andhra Pradesh. Legend has it that the name means "broken knees" in Kannada, referencing a battle between the native Indians and the British in which, due to the rocky and hilly terrain, many British soldiers reportedly suffered broken knees during their defeat. The town is famous for the unique Molkalmuru sarees manufactured here.

== Demographics ==
As of the 2011 Indian census, Molakalmuru has a population of 15,797, with males comprising 50.35% and females 49.65%. The town has an average literacy rate of 71.44%, which is slightly lower than the national average of 74.04%. Male literacy stands at 77.66%, while female literacy is 65.13%. Additionally, 11.77% of the population is under six years of age.

Languages spoken as of 2011.
1. Kannada (76.1%)
2. Telugu (15.6%)
3. Urdu (6.72%)
4. Marathi (1.09%)
5. Others (0.42%)

== Molakalmuru Silk Sarees ==
Molakalmuru silk sarees are the traditional sarees that are woven in the region. Molakalmuru sarees are also called Karnataka Kanchipuram. Recently they have been granted a Geographical Indication tag and its tag number is 53.

== Important Places ==
- Amakundi is a small village located in Molakalmuru Taluka, Chitradurga District, Karnataka, India. In this village, there is a panje makan and mazar mubarak of Masumvali Dada
- Ashoka Siddapura is an important archeological site where Emperor Ashoka's edicts were found. Nearby is Ramagiri, a hillock that has mythical associations with the epic Ramayana. A temple dedicated to Rameshwara built in 926 CE. exists here.
- Brahmagiri village is the ancient site of Ishila, one of emperor Ashoka's provincial capitals. His earliest rock edicts in Brahmi script and Prakrit language (3rd century BC) containing Kannada words were discovered.
- Devasamudra village is the ancient site of Devasamudra in the Ramayana. Ram had offered prayers to Shiva on a hill called Jatangi Rameshwara, which is located in Devasamudra Village, 3 kilometers from Rampura.
- Shirekola Village which has the Shree Guru Raghavendra Temple, located near Rampura.
- Jakkalavadike Village, near Siddapura, is named after old art works in the region. (Jakkalavadike means "house of world art" in Kannada). There are other facets to the village.
- The Nunkemale Siddeshwara Temple is a famous temple in the region and once in three years, a jaathre is held in the town. Another jaathre is held every year on the Nunkemalle hill for three days and people from the surrounding villages throng the fair.
- The Sri Rama Temple is another famous temple in this region. Every year, the Ramnavami festival is celebrated here with great pomp and splendour. It also has a large reservoir and a huge rock which is popularly known as kugo bande, or the rock that screams. Here, tourists can hear echoes of their voices. The sithaphala fruits (custard apples) that grow in these hillocks are immensely delicious.
