= Karnataka Public Works Department =

State Agency overview
- Formed: 1856 (170 years ago)
- Type: Governmental
- Jurisdiction: Karnataka
- Headquarters: Vikasa Soudha, M.S.Building, Dr.Ambedkar Road, Bangalore 560001; 12°58′40.2″N 77°35′22.3″E
- Ministers responsible: Satish Jarakiholi, Public Works Department (Excluding Ports and Inland Water Transport); Mankal Vaidya, Ports & Inland Water Transport
- State Agency executive: B. Guruprasad, Principal Secretary; Additional Secretary
- Website: kpwd.karnataka.gov.in/english

Karnataka Public Works Department (also known as Karnataka Public Works, Ports and Inland Water Transport Department or KPWD) is a government ministry Government of Karnataka agency in charge of the public works in the state of Karnataka, India. It is entrusted with the responsibility of construction and maintenance of buildings for most of the Karnataka government departments and Public undertakings and maintenance of road works including the National Highways, State Highways and Major District roads.

== History ==
The public works department was established in 1856 in the then Mysore State. Prior to this the Revenue officers were responsible for public works in the state.

Historical buildings constructed by Public Works Department
| Year | Building | Location | Cost |
|---|---|---|---|
| 1869 | Bangalore Central Jail | Bangalore | ₹ 46,047 |
| 1868 | Bowring Hospital | Bangalore | ₹ 2,16,454 |
| 1879 | Government Museum | Bangalore | ₹ 48,335 |
| 1869-1917 | Public Offices | Bangalore | ₹ 5,95,991 |
| 1882-1924 | The Central College | Bangalore | ₹ 5,44,599 |
| 1894 | Maharaja College of Mysore | Mysore | ₹ 2,08,000 |
| 1895 | Public Offices | Mysore | ₹ 1,75,506 |
| 1896 | Victoria Hospital | Bangalore | ₹ 7,84,000 |
| 1899 | Law Court Buildings | Mysore | ₹ 21,470 |
| 1907 | Sheshadri Iyer Memorial Hall | Bangalore | ₹ 83,624 |
| 1917 | Chamarajendra Technical Institute | Mysore | ₹ 2,44,516 |
| 1917 | Minto Eye Hospital | Bangalore | ₹ 2,82,000 |
| 1917 | The Government High School | Bangalore | ₹ 1,55,502 |
| 1918 | Krishna Rajendra Hospital | Mysore | ₹ 3,65,000 |
| 1920-1922 | University Buildings | Mysore | ₹ 2,41,262 |
| | Vanivilas Institute | Bangalore | ₹ 69,567 |
| | Fernhill Palace | Ooty | ₹ 4,78,000 |
