= Badanahatti =

- village
- Location in Karnataka, India Badanahatti (India)
- Coordinates: 15.15°N 76.92°E
- Country: India
- State: Karnataka
- District: Bellary
- Talukas: Kurugodu

Government
  - Body: Gram panchayat

Population (2001)
  - Total: 6,977

Languages
  - Official: Kannada
- Time zone: UTC+5:30 (IST)
- ISO 3166 code: IN-KA
- Vehicle registration: KA
- Website: karnataka.gov.in

Badanahatti is a village in the southern state of Karnataka, India. It is located in the Kurugodu taluk of Ballari district in Karnataka.

== Demographics ==
As of 2001 India census, Badanahatti had a population of 6977 with 3583 males and 3394 females.

== See also ==
- Ballari
- Districts of Karnataka
