= Daroji railway station =

Railway station in Karnataka

Daroji

General information
- Location: State Highway 29, Hosa Daroji, Sandur taluk, Ballari district, Karnatak; India
- Coordinates: 15°13′38″N 76°42′00″E
- Elevation: 466 metres (1,529 ft)
- System: Indian Railways station
- Owner: Indian Railways
- Operator: South Western Railway zone
- Line: Guntakal–Vasco da Gama line
- Platforms: 3
- Tracks: Double Electric-Line

Construction
- Structure type: Standard (on ground)

Other information
- Status: Functioning
- Station code: DAJ
- Zone(s): South Western Railway zone
- Division(s): Hubballi

Services
Preceding station	Indian Railways	Following station
Kudatini towards ?	South Western Railway zone Guntakal–Vasco da Gama section	Toranagallu Junction towards ?
Location
- Interactive map

Daroji railway station is a railway station located on the Guntakal–Vasco da Gama line operated by the South Western Railway zone under Hubballi railway division. It is situated beside State Highway 29 at Hosa Daroji, Sandur taluk at Kudathini in Ballari district in the Indian state of Karnatak.
