= Siddammanahalli =

Siddammanahalli S.D.Halli
- village
- Location in Karnataka, India Siddammanahalli (India)
- Coordinates: 15.15°N 76.92°E
- Country: India
- State: Karnataka
- District: Bellary
- Taluka: Kurugodu

Population (2011)
  - Total: 6,133

Languages
  - Official: Kannada
- Time zone: UTC+5:30 (IST)
- PIN: 583115
- Nearest city: Bellary
- Lok Sabha constituency: Bellary
- Vidhan Sabha constituency: Kampli

Siddammanahalli is a village in the southern state of Karnataka, India. It is located in the Kurugodu taluk of the Ballari district.

== Demographics ==
As of the 2011 India census, Siddammanahalli had a population of 6,133, with 3,047 males and 3,086 females. People belonging to Scheduled Tribes make up 33.57% of the population, while those belonging to Scheduled Castes make up 19.76% of the population.

== See also ==
- Bellary
- Districts of Karnataka
