= Gudekote Wildlife Sanctuary =

Sloth bear sanctuary in India

Gudekote Sloth Bear Sanctuary
- IUCN category IV (habitat/species management area)
- Location within Karnataka Location within India
- Interactive map of Gudekote Sloth Bear Sanctuary
- Location: Ballari district, Karnataka, India
- Nearest city: Ballari, Ballari district
- Coordinates: 15°14′N 76°31′E
- Area: 167.59 km^{2} (64.71 sq mi)
- Established: 2013
- Governing body: Kamalapura Wildlife Subdivision, Karnataka Forest Department

Gudekote Sloth Bear Sanctuary is located in Ballari district in Karnataka, India. It is spread over 38.48 km^{2} (14.86 sq mi). The sanctuary was created exclusively for the preservation of the Indian sloth bear (Melursus ursinus) and is Asia's second sloth bear sanctuary, the first being Daroji Sloth Bear Sanctuary.

In November 2013, the Government of Karnataka, declared 3848.84 hectares of the Gudekote Forest Reserve (Block A), Gudekote Extension Forest Reserve (Block A) and Halsagara Reserve Forests as Gudekote Sloth Bear Sanctuary vide Gazette Notification FEE 72 FWL 2013, issued on 11 November 2013. In the final notification Gazette Notification No. FEE 432 FWL 2014 issued on 21 September 2016, the sacntuary area was increased to 47.54 km^{2} (18.36 sq mi). Subsequently in 2019, through another government notification Gazette Notification No. FEE 62 FWL 2019, dated 16 May 2019, additional 120.04 km^{2} (46.35 sq mi) of reserved forest was declared as Gudekote Extension Sloth Bear Sanctuary, thereby increasing the total area of the sanctuary to 167.59 km^{2} (64.71 sq mi).

This is the second wildlife sanctuary declared in Ballari district of Karnataka to protect Indian sloth bear (Melursus ursinus), with the 1st being Daroji Sloth Bear Sanctuary.

== Flora and fauna ==
In addition to the flagship species i.e. Sloth Bear, the sanctuary is also home to various other animals viz. Indian Leopard, Pangolin, Porcupine, Indian Fox, Indian Jackal, Jungle cat, Indian Star Tortoise, Asian Palm Civet, Red Sand Boa, to name a few. The sanctuary is also home to a variety of avian species and is said to have around 130 different species of them.

== Human and animal conflict ==
Declaration of Gudekote as a sanctuary has helped to mitigate man-animal conflicts to a great extent. This is primarily because human activities such as collection of Non Timber Forest Produce (NTFP) and other interventions in the wildlife sanctuary have been prevented to a great extent after the area was declared as a wildlife sanctuary. Anti poaching camps have strengthened the protection being accorded to wildlife.
