= List of bus depots in Karnataka =

Karnataka State Road Transport Corporation, abbreviated and better known as KSRTC is a state-owned public road transport company in the Indian state of Karnataka.

== Bus Depot ==
A bus depot is an operating base of a Transport corporation. It accommodates parking, servicing and maintenance facilities for vehicles, an administrative function and facilities for staff. KSRTC have facilities for servicing and maintenance work in-house at the depot. The principal operational tasks to be carried out at a bus depot includes allocating and dispatching buses with crews according to schedule, processing cash paid in by conductors or drivers. Facilities required for these purposes often includes a signing-on office where crews report for duty and a cash office where conductors or drivers pay in the cash collected during their duties and an office for managerial and supervisory staff. Chargeman, supervisors report to the depot manager, which is the highest designation on the management front.

Adequate and satisfactory storage will be required for operating, engineering, personnel and financial records as well as for equipment such as ticket machines and tickets and associated documents such as waybills. KSRTC has its own-account maintenance workshops with specialist facilities catering Coach building (at Kengeri, Hassan, Hubli and Yadgir) and vehicle maintenance. Minimum servicing and maintenance requirements at depots include facilities for vehicle fueling, washing and cleaning, inspection pits, tools and equipment for minor routine servicing and mechanical repairs, facilities for changing and maintaining tires, storage accommodation for spare parts and office accommodation for supervisory staff. Many minor maintenance tasks are carried out while vehicles are waiting for their next trips. Another important function of a bus depot is the accommodation of buses which are not immediately required for operation or maintenance. There must be sufficient space for parking all buses based at the depot together with any others based elsewhere that require temporary accommodation and for safe maneuvering of vehicles in and out of the parking area. In the case of urban bus operations usually there will be a normal requirement for the entire fleet to be parked overnight, unless a significant number of vehicles are required for all-night operation.

== Environmental friendly initiative ==
The environmental problems can be minimized with good design of the facilities, proper maintenance, good discipline and housekeeping. KSRTC is making efforts to increase fuel efficiency of its buses. This relies on drivers and maintenance staff at the bus depot. KSRTC also uses alternative bio fuel like ethanol fuel, CNG, Millettia pinnata seed Oil (Indian Beech seed Oil) and procuring to plan electric buses so that it can reduce carbon emissions as an environmental friendly approach. In 2017–18, KSRTC managed to save more than 3 lakh litres of diesel compared to 99,373 litres in 2016–17. The increased mileage of KSRTC buses has also resulted in savings of Rs 59.73 lakh and Rs 1.68 crore in 2016-17 and 2017–18, respectively. The depot in Mysore also contributed to the health sector by converting buses to ICUs during the COVID-19 pandemic.

== List of existing Government Bus depots in Karnataka by Transport Corporation ==
=== KSRTC ===
Sl	Depot Number	Depot Name	Division	District	Ref
1		Bagepalli	Chikballapur	Chikkaballapura	
2		Chikballapur	Chikballapur	Chikkaballapura	
3		Shidlaghatta	Chikballapur	Chikkaballapura	
4		Chintamani	Chikballapur	Chikkaballapura	
5		Gauribidanur	Chikballapur	Chikkaballapura	
6		Doddaballapur	Chikballapur	Bangalore Rural	
7	1	Bangalore Mofussil-1	Bangalore Central	Bangalore Urban	
8	2	Bangalore Mofussil-2	Bangalore Central	Bangalore Urban	
9	4	Bangalore Mofussil-4	Bangalore Central	Bangalore Urban	
10	5	Bangalore Mofussil-5	Bangalore Central	Bangalore Urban	
11	6	Bangalore Mofussil-6	Bangalore Central	Bangalore Urban	
12		Nelamangala	Bangalore Central	Bangalore Urban	
13		Anekal	Bengaluru South	Bangalore Urban	
14		Channapatna	Bengaluru South	Ramanagara	
15		Harohalli	Bengaluru South	Bengaluru South District	
16		Kanakapura	Bengaluru South	Bengaluru South District	
17		Magadi	Bengaluru South	Bengaluru South District	
17		Ramanagara	Bengaluru South	Bengaluru South District	
19		Chamarajanagar	Chamarajanagar	Chamarajanagar	
20		Gundlupet	Chamarajanagar	Chamarajanagar	
21		Kollegal	Chamarajanagar	Chamarajanagar	
22	1	Mysore Mofussil-1	Mysore Rural	Mysore	
23	3	Mysore Mofussil-2	Mysore Rural	Mysore	
24		Heggadadevanakote	Mysore Rural	Mysore	
25		Hunsur	Mysore Rural	Mysore	
26		Krishnarajanagara	Mysore Rural	Mysore	
27		Piriyapatna	Mysore Rural	Mysore	
28	2	Kuvempunagar	Mysore City	Mysore	
29	3	Sathagalli	Mysore City	Mysore	
30	4	Vijayanagara	Mysore City	Mysore	
31		Nanjangudu	Mysuru City	Mysore	
32		Chikmagalur	Chikmagalur	Chikmagalur	
33		Kadur	Chikmagalur	Chikmagalur	
34		Mudigere	Chikmagalur	Chikmagalur	
35		Arsikere	Chikmagalur	Hassan	
36		Belur	Chikmagalur	Hassan	
37		Sakleshpur	Chikmagalur	Hassan	
38		Arkalgud	Hassan	Hassan	
39		Channarayapatna	Hassan	Hassan	
40	1	Hassan-1	Hassan	Hassan	
41	2	Hassan-2	Hassan	Hassan	
42		Holenarasipur	Hassan	Hassan	
43		Ramanathapura	Hassan	Hassan	
44		KGF	Kolar	Kolar	
45		Kolar	Kolar	Kolar	
46		Malur	Kolar	Kolar	
47		Mulbagal	Kolar	Kolar	
48		Srinivasapura	Kolar	Kolar	
49		Krishnarajapet	Mandya	Mandya	
50		Maddur	Mandya	Mandya	
51		Malavalli	Mandya	Mandya	
52		Mandya	Mandya	Mandya	
53		Nagamangala	Mandya	Mandya	
54		Pandavapura	Mandya	Mandya	
55		Madikeri	Puttur	Kodagu	
56		BC Road	Puttur	Dakshina Kannada	
57		Puttur	Puttur	Dakshina Kannada	
58		Sullia	Puttur	Dakshina Kannada	
59		Dharmasthala	Puttur	Dakshina Kannada	
60	1	Mangalore-1	Mangalore	Dakshina Kannada	
61	2	Mangalore-2	Mangalore	Dakshina Kannada	
62	3	Mangalore-3	Mangalore	Dakshina Kannada	
63		Kundapura	Mangalore	Udupi	
64		Udupi	Mangalore	Udupi	
65		Kunigal	Tumkur	Tumkur	
66		Tiptur	Tumkur	Tumkur	
67	1	Tumkur-1	Tumkur	Tumkur	
68	2	Tumkur-2	Tumkur	Tumkur	
69		Turuvekere	Tumkur	Tumkur	
70		Madhugiri	Madhugiri	Tumkur	
71		Sira	Madhugiri	Tumkur	
72		Pavagada	Madhugiri	Tumkur	
73		Chitradurga	Chitradurga	Chitradurga	
74		Hiriyur	Chitradurga	Chitradurga	
75		Challakere	Chitradurga	Chitradurga	
76		Hosadurga	Chitradurga	Chitradurga	
77	1	Davanagere-1	Davanagere	Davanagere	
78	2	Davanagere-2	Davanagere	Davanagere	
79		Harihara	Davanagere	Davanagere	
81		Channagiri	Davanagere	Davanagere	
81		Sagar	Shimoga	Shimoga	
82		Shimoga	Shimoga	Shimoga	
83		Bhadravati	Shimoga	Shimoga	
84		Shikaripura	Shimoga	Shimoga	
85		Honnali	Shimoga	Davanagere	

=== KKRTC ===
Sl	Depot Number	Depot Name	Division	District	Ref
1		Harapanahalli	Hospet	Vijayanagara	
2		Hagari Bommanahalli	Hospet	Vijayanagara	
3		Hospet	Hospet	Vijayanagara	
4		Huvina Hadagali	Hospet	Vijayanagara	
5		Sandur	Bellary	Bellary	
6		Kudligi	Hospet	Vijayanagara	
7	1	Bellary-1	Bellary	Bellary	
8	2	Bellary-2	Bellary	Bellary	
9	3	Bellary-3	Bellary	Bellary	
10	4	Kurugodu	Bellary	Bellary	
11		Siraguppa	Bellary	Bellary	
12		Aurad	Bidar	Bidar	
13		Basavkalyan	Bidar	Bidar	
14		Bhalki	Bidar	Bidar	
15	1	Bidar-1	Bidar	Bidar	
16	2	Bidar-2	Bidar	Bidar	
17		Humnabad	Bidar	Bidar	
18		Chincholi	Gulbarga-1	Kalaburagi	
19		Chittapur	Gulbarga-1	Kalaburagi	
20	1	Gulbarga-1	Gulbarga-1	Kalaburagi	
21	4	Gulbarga-4	Gulbarga-1	Kalaburagi	
22		Kalagi	Gulbarga-1	Kalaburagi	
23		Sedum	Gulbarga-1	Kalaburagi	
24		Aland	Gulbarga-2	Kalaburagi	
25	2	Gulbarga-2	Gulbarga-2	Kalaburagi	
26	3	Gulbarga-3	Gulbarga-2	Kalaburagi	
27		Jewargi	Gulbarga-2	Kalaburagi	
28		Afzalpur	Gulbarga-2	Kalaburagi	
29		Gangavati	Koppal	Koppal	
30		Koppal	Koppal	Koppal	
31		Kuknur	Koppal	Koppal	
32		Kustagi	Koppal	Koppal	
33		Yelburga	Koppal	Koppal	
34		Devadurga	Raichur	Raichur	
35		Lingasugur	Raichur	Raichur	
36		Manvi	Raichur	Raichur	
37		Maski	Raichur	Raichur	
38	1	Raichur-1	Raichur	Raichur	
39	2	Raichur-2	Raichur	Raichur	
40	3	Raichur-3	Raichur	Raichur	
41		Sindhanur	Raichur	Raichur	
42		Gurmitkal	Yadgir	Yadgir	
43		Shahapur	Yadgir	Yadgir	
44		Shorapur	Yadgir	Yadgir	
45		Yadgir	Yadgir	Yadgir	
46	1	Bijapur-1	Bijapur	Bijapur	
47	2	Bijapur-2	Bijapur	Bijapur	
48		Bijapur-3	Bijapur	Bijapur	
49		Indi	Bijapur	Bijapur	
50		Muddebihal	Bijapur	Bijapur	
51		Sindgi	Bijapur	Bijapur	
52		Talikot	Bijapur	Bijapur	
53		Basavana Bagewadi	Bijapur	Bijapur	

=== NWKRTC ===
Sl	Depot Number	Depot Name	Division	District	Ref
1		Badami	Bagalkot	Bagalkot	
2		Bagalkot	Bagalkot	Bagalkot	
3		Bilagi	Bagalkot	Bagalkot	
4		Guledgudda	Bagalkot	Bagalkot	
5		Hungund	Bagalkot	Bagalkot	
6		Ilkal	Bagalkot	Bagalkot	
7		Jamakhandi	Bagalkot	Bagalkot	
8		Mudhol	Bagalkot	Bagalkot	
9		Bailhongal	Belgaum	Belagavi	
10	1	Belgaum-1	Belgaum	Belagavi	
11	2	Belgaum-2	Belgaum	Belagavi	
12	3	Belgaum-3	Belgaum	Belagavi	
13	4	Belgaum-4	Belgaum	Belagavi	
14		Khanapur	Belgaum	Belagavi	
15		Ramadurga	DHARWAD RURAL	Belagavi	
16		Athani	Chikkodi	Belagavi	
17		Chikkodi	Chikkodi	Belagavi	
18		Gokak	Chikkodi	Belagavi	
19		Hukkeri	Chikkodi	Belagavi	
20		Nippani	Chikkodi	Belagavi	
21		Raibag	Chikkodi	Belagavi	
21		Sankeshwar	Chikkodi	Belagavi	
23		Savadatti	Dharwad Rural	Belagavi	
24		Dandeli	Dharwad Rural	Uttara Kannada	
25		Haliyal	Dharwad Rural	Uttara Kannada	
26		Dharwad Mofussil	Dharwad Rural	Dharwad district	
27	1	Hubli City-1	Hubli Dharwad City	Dharwad	
28	2	Hubli BRTS	Hubli Dharwad City	Dharwad	
29	3	Dharwad BRTS	Hubli Dharwad City	Dharwad	
30	1	Hubli Mofussil-1	Hubli Rural	Dharwad	
31	2	Hubli Mofussil-2	Hubli Rural	Dharwad	
32	3	Hubli Mofussil-3	Hubli Rural	Dharwad	
33		Navalgund	Hubli Rural	Dharwad	
34		Kalaghatagi	Hubli Rural	Dharwad	
35		Betageri	Gadag	Gadag	
36		Gadag	Gadag	Gadag	
37		Gajendragad	Gadag	Gadag	
38		Laxmeshwar	Gadag	Gadag	
39		Mundargi	Gadag	Gadag	
40		Naragund	Gadag	Gadag	
41		Ron	Gadag	Gadag	
42		Byadgi	Haveri	Haveri	
43		Hanagal	Haveri	Haveri	
44		Haveri	Haveri	Haveri	
45		Hirekerur	Haveri	Haveri	
46		Ranebennur	Haveri	Haveri	
47		Savanur	Haveri	Haveri	
48		Sirsi	Uttara Kannada (Sirsi)	Uttara Kannada	
49		Karwar	Uttara Kannada (Sirsi)	Uttara Kannada	
50		Ankola	Uttara Kannada (Sirsi)	Uttara Kannada	
51		Bhatkal	Uttara Kannada (Sirsi)	Uttara Kannada	
52		Kumta	Uttara Kannada (Sirsi)	Uttara Kannada	
53		Yellapura	Uttara Kannada (Sirsi)	Uttara Kannada	

=== BMTC ===
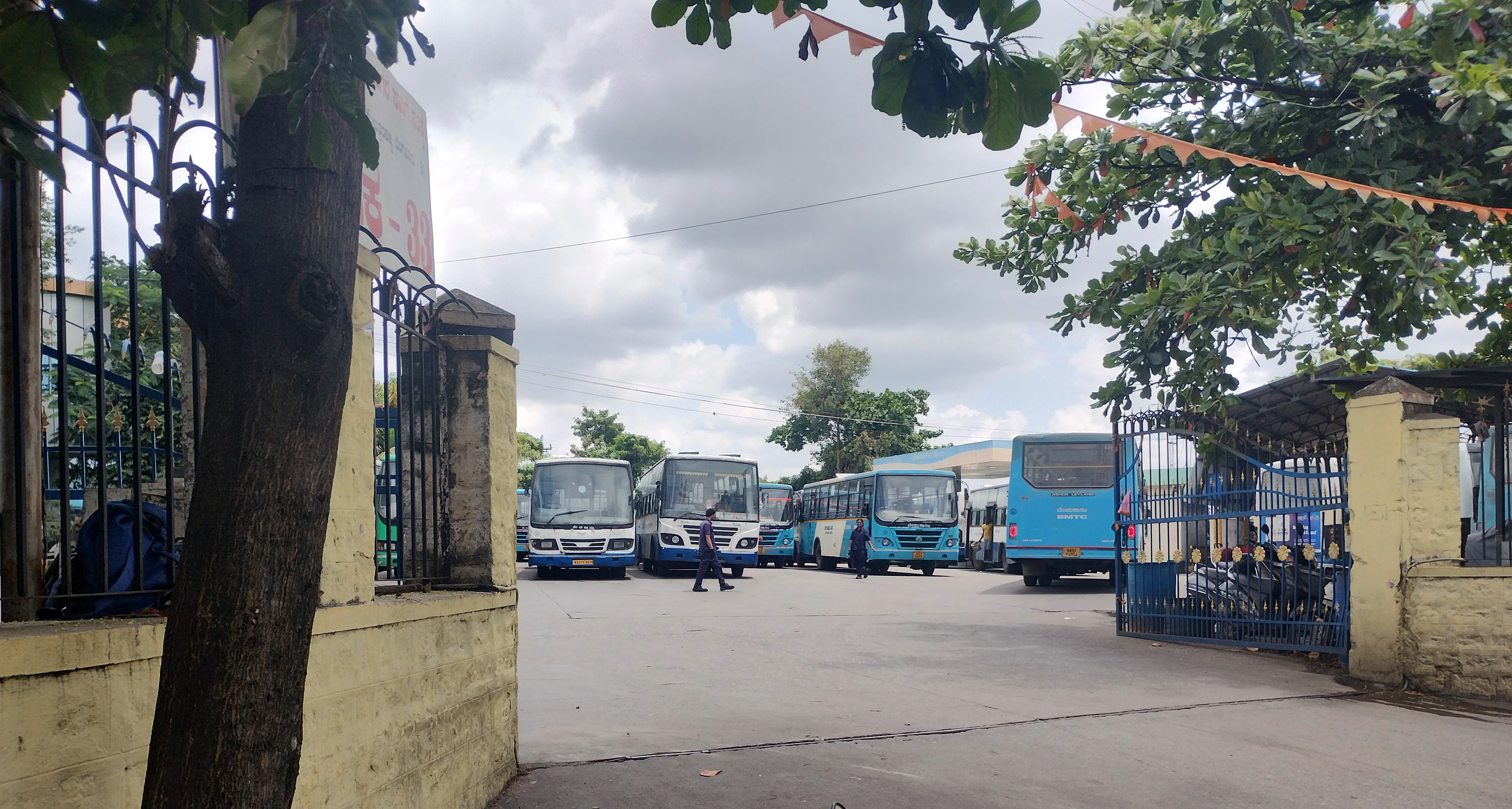
BMTC bus depot, sector 33

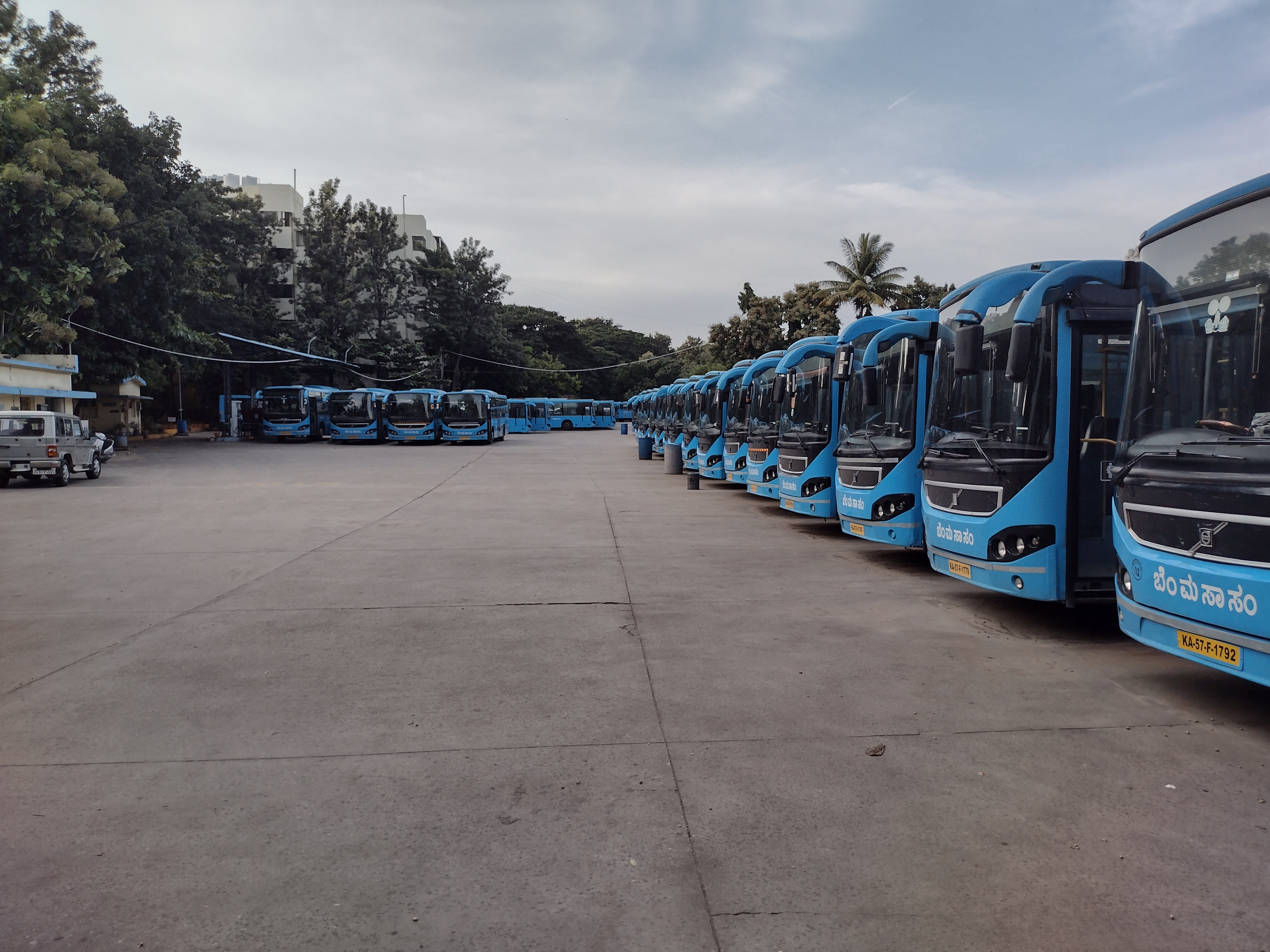
Kamakya Bus Depo, Bengaluru

Sl	Depot Number	Depot Name	Division	District	Ref
1	2	Shanthinagar	South	Bangalore Urban	
2	3	Shanthinagar	South	Bangalore Urban	
3	4	Jayanagara 4th T Block	South	Bangalore Urban	
4	6	Indiranagar	East	Bangalore Urban	
5	7	Subhashnagar	Central	Bangalore Urban	
6	8	Yeshwanthpura	North	Bangalore Urban	
7	9	Peenya	North-West	Bangalore Urban	
8	10	Hennur	North-East	Bangalore Urban	
9	11	Yelahanka	North	Bangalore Urban	
10	12	Kengeri	West	Bangalore Urban	
11	13	Kathriguppe	Central	Bangalore Urban	
12	14	R. T. Nagar	North-East	Bangalore Urban	
13	15	Koramangala	East	Bangalore Urban	
14	16	Deepanjalinagar	West	Bangalore Urban	
15	17	Chandra Layout	West	Bangalore Urban	
16	18	ITPL	Central	Bangalore Urban	
17	19	Electronics city	East	Bangalore Urban	
18	20	Banashankari	South	Bangalore Urban	
19	21	Channasandra	West	Bangalore Urban	
20	22	Peenya	North-West	Bangalore Urban	
21	23	Kalyananagar	North-East	Bangalore Urban	
22	24	K. R. Puram	North-East	Bangalore Urban	
23	25	H. S. R. Layout	Central	Bangalore Urban	
24	26	Yeshwanthpura	North	Bangalore Urban	
25	27	Jigani	South	Bangalore Urban	
26	28	Hebbala	Central	Bangalore Urban	
27	29	K. R. Puram	North-East	Bangalore Urban	
28	30	Yelahanka	North	Bangalore Urban	
29	31	Sumanahalli	North-West	Bangalore Urban	
30	32	Surya city	East	Bangalore Urban	
31	33	Poornapragna Layout	West	Bangalore Urban	
32	34	Kothanur dinne	South	Bangalore Urban	
33	35	Kannalli	North-West	Bangalore Urban	
34	36	Bidadi	West	Bangalore Urban	
35	37	Kengeri	West	Bangalore Urban	
36	38	Chikkanagamangala	East	Bangalore Urban	
37	39	Hosakote	North-East	Bangalore Urban	
38	40	Nelamangala	North-West	Bangalore Urban	
39	41	Gunjur	East	Bangalore Urban	
40	42	Kodathi	East	Bangalore Urban	
41	43	Shivanapura	North-West	Bangalore Urban	
42	44	Anjanapura	South	Bangalore Urban	
43	45	M. S. Palya	North	Bangalore Urban	
44	46	Sadenahalli	North	Bangalore Urban	
45	47	Mandur	North-East	Bangalore Urban	
46	48	Byrathi	North-East	Bangalore Urban	
47	49	Bidadi	West	Ramanagara	
48	50	Devanahalli	North	Bangalore Urban	
49	51	Sadaramangala	East	Bangalore Urban	
50	52	Uttanahalli	North	Bangalore Urban	

=== List of upcoming Bus depots of KSRTC & BMTC ===
Upcoming Depots
Sl	Depot Name	Division	District	Transport corporation	Ref
1	Gudibande	Chikballapur	Chikkaballapura	KSRTC	
2	vijayapura	Chikballapur	Bangalore Rural	KSRTC	
3	Shankaranarayana	Mangalore	Udupi	KSRTC	
4	Jagalur	Davanagere	Davanagere	KSRTC	
5	Sringeri	Chikmagalur	Chikmagalur	KSRTC	
6	Chikkanayakanahalli	Tumkur	Tumkur	KSRTC	
7	Byndoor	Mangaluru	Udupi	KSRTC	
8	Molkalmuru	Chitradurga	Chitradurga	KSRTC	
9	Holalkere	Chitradurga	Chitradurga	KSRTC	
10	Gubbi	Tumkur	Tumkur	KSRTC	
11	Nagadasanahalli		Bangalore Urban	BMTC	
12	Pillaganahalli		Bangalore Urban	BMTC	
13	Sathanur		Bangalore Urban	BMTC	
14	Madapanahalli		Bangalore Urban	BMTC	
15	Tavarekere		Bangalore Urban	BMTC	
16	Attibele		Bangalore Urban	BMTC	
17	Kushalanagar	Puttur	Kodagu	KSRTC	
18	Chikka Bettahalli		Bengaluru Urban	BMTC	

== See also ==
- List of bus stations in Karnataka
- Karnataka State Road Transport Corporation (KSRTC)
- Bangalore Metropolitan Transport Corporation (BMTC)
- North Western Karnataka Road Transport Corporation (NWKRTC)
- Kalyana Karnataka Road Transport Corporation (KKRTC)
- Nrupatunga city bus service
