= Nrupatunga Nagara Sarige =

Public bus service in India

Nrupatunga Nagara Sarige ನೃಪತುಂಗ ನಾಗರ ಸರಿಗೆ
- Parent: Kalyana Karnataka Road Transport Corporation
- Founded: 18 October 2012
- Locale: Kalaburagi
- Service type: Urban
- Operator: Government of Karnataka
- Website: KKRTC Main Website

Nrupatunga Nagara Sarige is a city public transport bus service in Kalaburagi, in Karnataka, India.

It is operated by the Kalyana Karnataka Road Transport Corporation.

== History ==
The service was introduced by the KKRTC on 18 October 2012 with 17 buses and 290 schedules, and covering a distance of 53.4 km.

== Rashtrakuta Sarige ==
KKRTC started the service between Sedam and Kalaburagi, under the name Rashtrakuta service, as Malkhed in Sedam Taluk was the capital of the Rashtrakuta Kingdom.

== See also ==
List of bus depots in Karnataka

List of bus stations in Karnataka

== Gallery ==
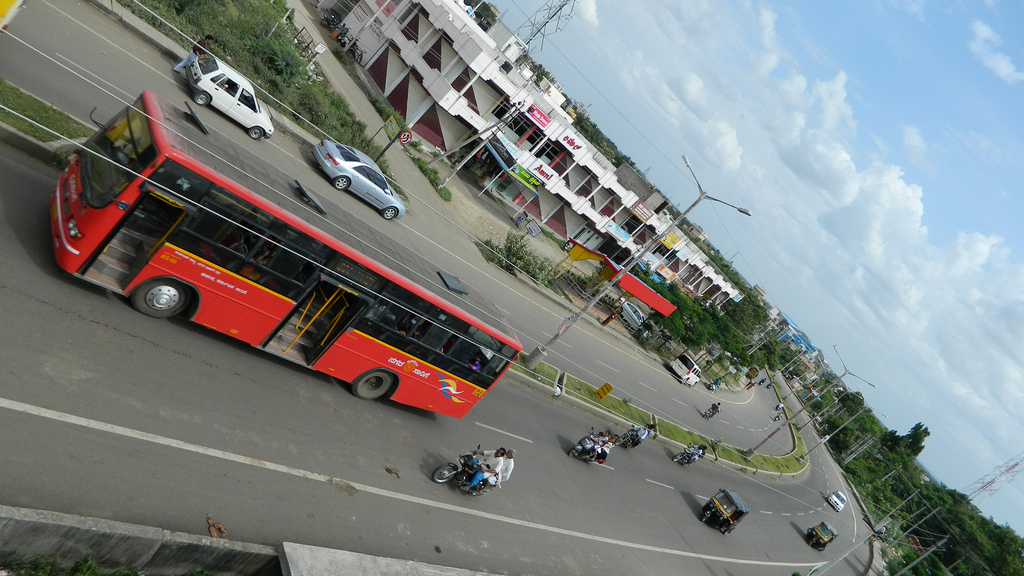
Nrupatunga Nagara Sarige
