= Dodda Basaveshwara Temple =

Hindu temple in India

Coordinates: 15.3446°N 76.8344°E

The Dodda Basaveswara temple is situated in the town of Kurugodu, which is now a taluk/divisional headquarters in the Ballari district of Karnataka, India. The Dodda Basaveswara temple ("temple of the big bull-lord") is the main attraction in town; it attracts many pilgrims who are devotees of Shiva. The idol of the big bull, called Nandi or Nadeeswara, is cut out of a monolithic rock, and is 12 ft (3.7 m) high. The annual Ratha Yatra of the deity is conducted on the Holi Purnima day, which marks the beginning of the spring season, as well as the beginning of the New Year.Every year Ratha Mahothsava of the Swamy Dodda Basaveshwara held on holy Poornima and Kurugodu Doddabasaveshara is exactly opposite to Hampi Virupaksha.
