= Korlagundi =

- village
- Location in Karnataka, India Korlagundi (India)
- Coordinates: 15.29°N 77.04°E
- Country: India
- State: Karnataka
- District: Bellary
- Talukas: Bellary

Government
  - Body: Grama panchayat

Population (2001)
  - Total: 6,240

Languages
  - Official: Kannada
- Time zone: UTC+5:30 (IST)
- Postal code: ೫೮೩೧೦೩
- ISO 3166 code: IN-KA
- Vehicle registration: KA
- Website: karnataka.gov.in

Korlagundi is a village in the southern state of Karnataka, India. It is located in the Bellary taluk of Bellary district in Karnataka.

== Demographics ==
As of 2001 India census, Korlagundi had a population of 6240 with 3142 males and 3098 females.

== See also ==
- Bellary
- Districts of Karnataka
