= Kudatini railway station =

Railway station in Karnataka

Kudatini
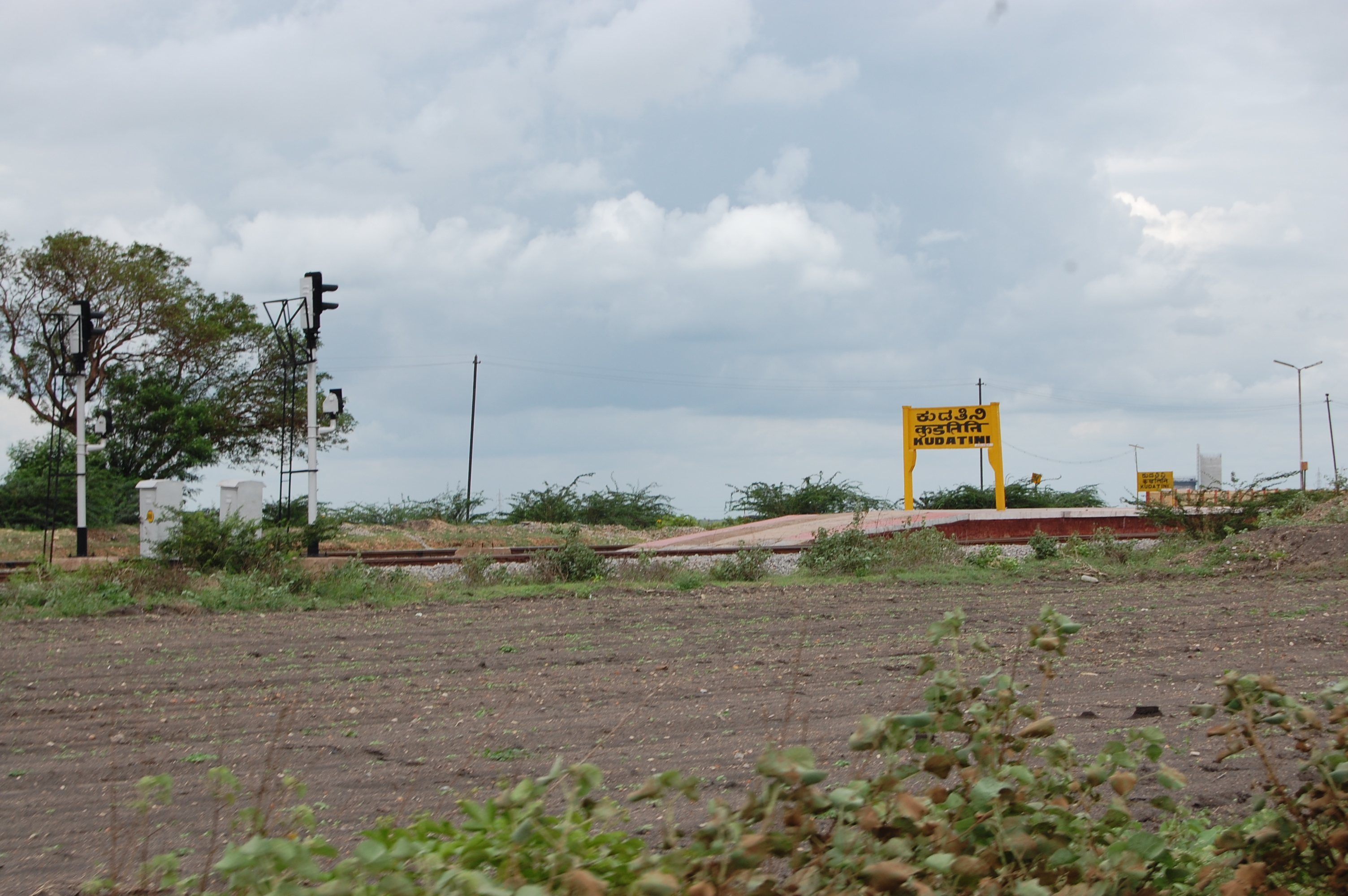

General information
- Location: Kurugodu Road, Kudathini, Ballari district, Karnatak; India
- Coordinates: 15°09′12″N 76°58′45″E
- Elevation: 480 metres (1,570 ft)
- System: Indian Railways station
- Owner: Indian Railways
- Operator: South Western Railway zone
- Line: Guntakal–Vasco da Gama line
- Platforms: 2
- Tracks: Double Electric-Line

Construction
- Structure type: Standard (on ground)

Other information
- Status: Functioning
- Station code: KDN
- Zone(s): South Western Railway zone
- Division(s): Hubballi

Services
Preceding station	Indian Railways	Following station
Ballari Junction towards ?	South Western Railway zone Guntakal–Vasco da Gama section	Daroji towards ?
Location
- Interactive map

Kudatini railway station is a railway station located on the Guntakal–Vasco da Gama line operated by the South Western Railway zone under Hubballi railway division. It is situated beside Kurugodu Road at Kudathini in Ballari district in the Indian state of Karnatak.
