= B. M. Nagaraja =

Indian politician (born 1972)

B. M. Nagaraja (born 1972) is an Indian politician from Karnataka who is an MLA from Siruguppa Assembly constituency which is reserved for ST community in Bellary district. He won the 2023 Karnataka Legislative Assembly election representing Indian National Congress.

== Early life and education ==
Nagaraja is from Siruguppa, Bellary district. His father B. Mareppa is a farmer. He passed Class 8 and discontinued his studies during his Class 10.

== Career ==
Nagaraja won from Siruguppa Assembly constituency representing Indian National Congress in the 2023 Karnataka Legislative Assembly election. He polled 90,862 votes and defeated his nearest rival, M. S. Somalingappa of Bharatiya Janata Party, by a margin of 37,032 votes. Earlier, he first became an MLA winning the 2013 Karnataka Legislative Assembly election. He polled 64,590 votes in 2013 poll, and defeated his nearest rival, M. S. Somalingappa of Bharatiya Janata Party, by a huge margin of 21,814 votes.
