= Daroji =

- Village
- Location in Karnataka, India Daroji (India)
- Coordinates: 15.07°N 76.55°E
- Country: India
- State: Karnataka
- District: Bellary
- Talukas: Sandur

Government
  - Body: Gram panchayat

Population (2011)
  - Total: 5,000

Languages
  - Official: Kannada
- Time zone: UTC+5:30 (IST)
- Postal code: 583129
- ISO 3166 code: IN-KA
- Vehicle registration: KA-34
- Website: karnataka.gov.in

Daroji is a village in the southern state of Karnataka, India. It is located in the Sandur taluk of Bellary district in Karnataka.

It is the location of the Daroji bear sanctuary.

== Demographic ==
As of 2001 India census, Daroji had a population of 8861 with 4450 males and 4411 females.

== See also ==
- Bellary
- Districts of Karnataka
