= Daroji Sloth Bear Sanctuary =

Sloth bear sanctuary in India

- IUCN category IV (habitat/species management area)
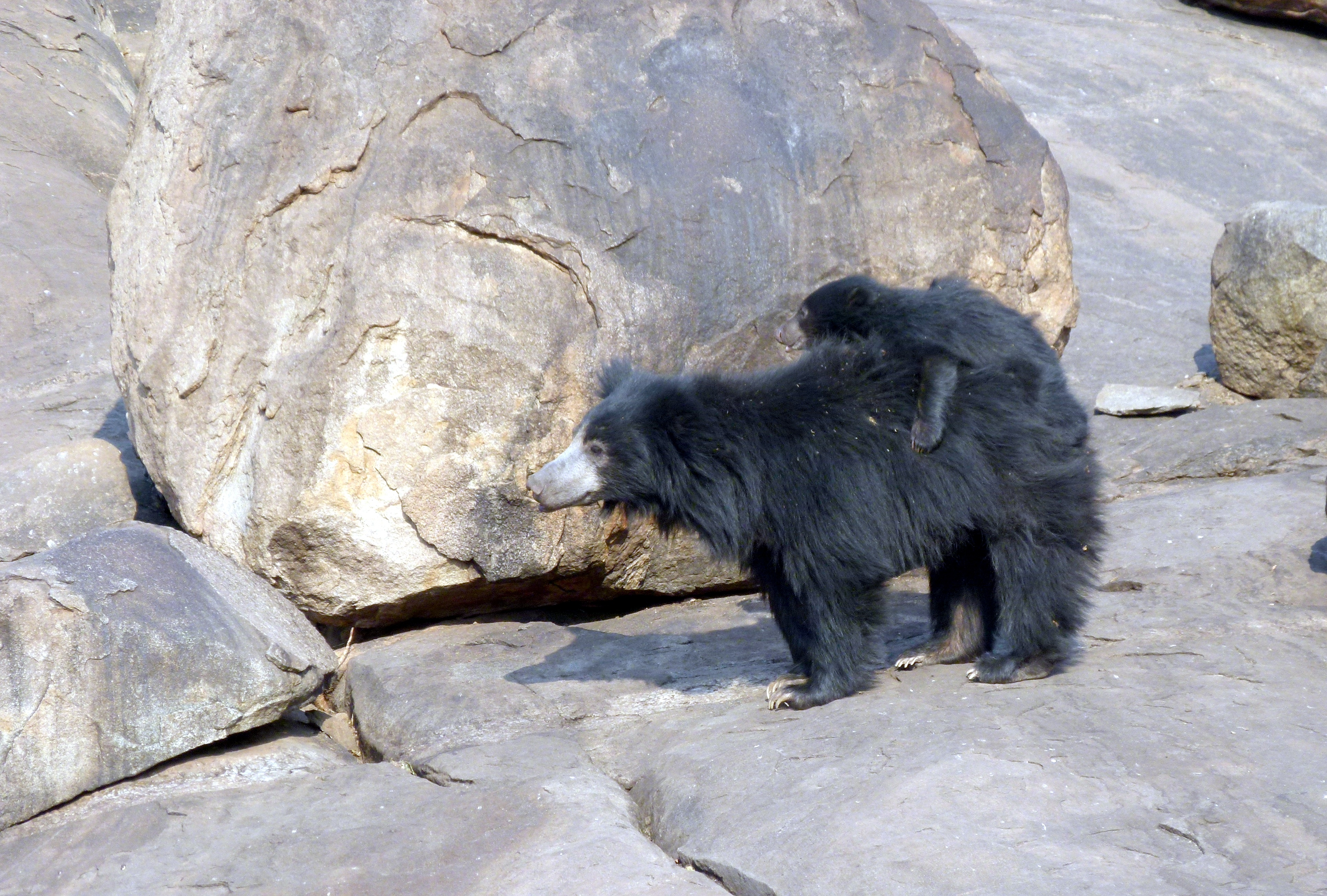
- A female sloth bear with cubs in the sanctuary

- Location within Karnataka Location within India
- Interactive map of Daroji Sloth Bear Sanctuary
- Location: Ballari district, Karnataka, India
- Nearest city: Ballari, Ballari district
- Coordinates: 15°14′N 76°31′E
- Area: 82.72 km^{2} (31.94 sq mi)
- Established: 1994
- Governing body: Kamalapura Wildlife Subdivision, Karnataka Forest Department

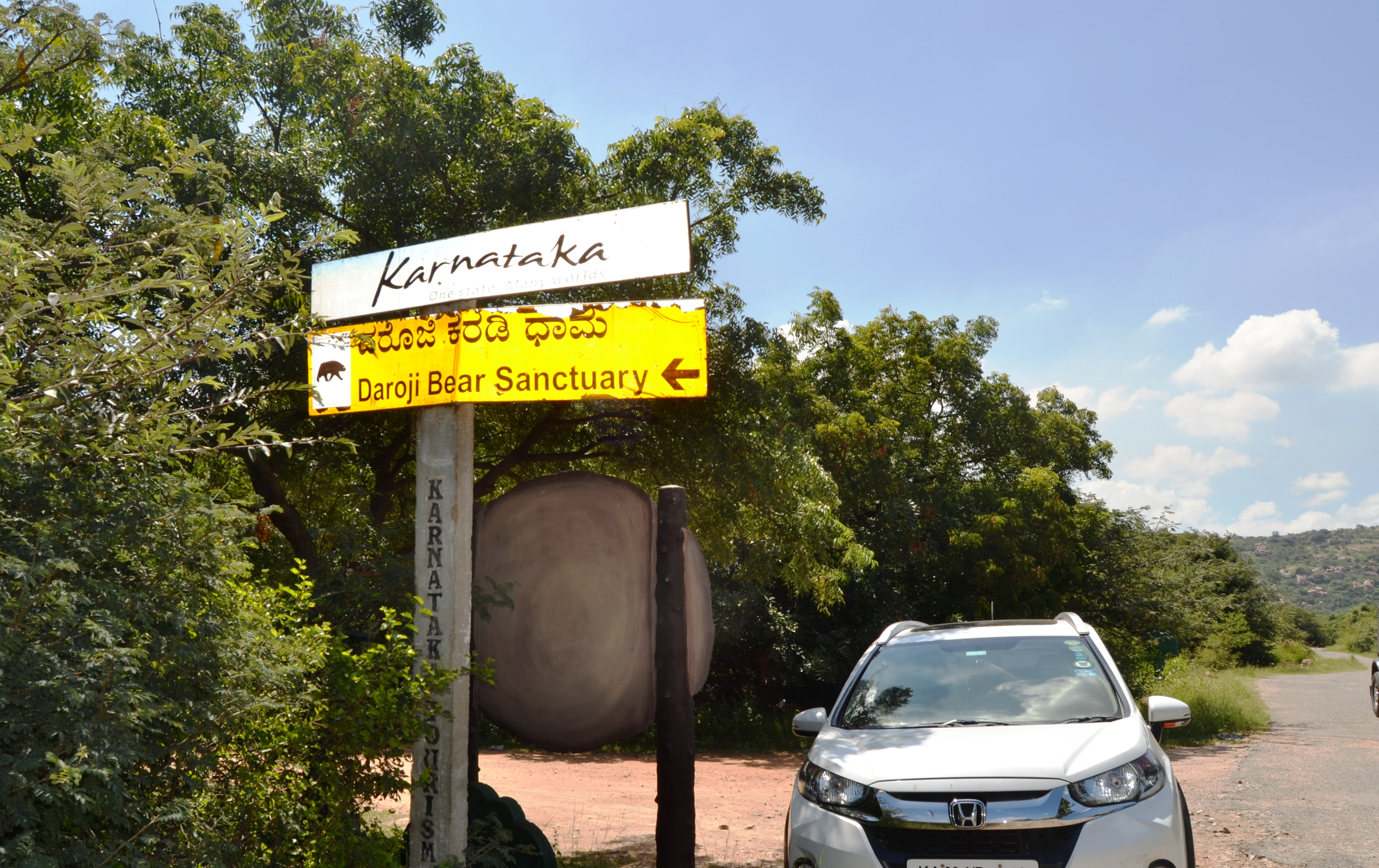
The entrance board of Daroji Sloth Bear Sanctuary

Daroji Sloth Bear Sanctuary is located in Ballari district in Karnataka. This is Asia's first sloth bear sanctuary. It is spread over 82.72 km^{2} (31.94 sq mi). The sanctuary was created exclusively for the conservation of the sloth bear. It is about 50 km from Ballari and about 15 km from the World Heritage Site Hampi. The area between Daroji in Sandur taluka and Ramasagar of Hospet Taluk is host to numerous sloth bears.

In October 1994, the Government of Karnataka, declared 5587.30 hectares of the Bilikallu Forest Reserve as Daroji Bear Sanctuary. 15 years later, in October 2009, the government added 2685.50 hectares of the Bukkasagara Forest Reserve to the sanctuary. This resulted in the overall area to increase from 5587.3 hectares to 8272.8 hectares.

The sanctuary is open between 14:00 and 18:00 every day. There is a watchtower within the sanctuary, opposite Karadikallu Gudda, that provides a vantage point to view the bears descending from the adjacent hillocks during evening hours.

== Mythology ==
Jambhavan, the wise bear from the Ramayana is believed to have come from Daroji

== Flora and fauna ==
The flora of this sanctuary is primarily dry deciduous scrub and Southern thorn forests. At the time of declaration of the sanctuary, it was a large area of barren hillocks, but persistent efforts from Karnataka Forest Department have transformed the area into lush green forest, filled with local flora.

The sanctuary's flagship species is the Indian sloth bear (Melursus ursinus). It has a very stable population of sloth bears and they reside in the numerous caves found in the hillocks within the sanctuary. leopards, monitor lizards, mongoose, pangolins, star tortoises etc. are some of the other animals that abound in the sanctuary.

== Threats ==
The bears are threatened due to illegal mining in fragmented areas of the adjoining forests. The forest department and NGOs have also rescued many domestic bears from Daroji and surrounding areas. The age old practice of capturing a bear cub (claws are pulled out and male cubs are castrated) and domestication by Kalandars has reduced to a great extent, due to laws declaring them illegal. The domesticated bears were taken from home to home across villages and made to dance according to the direction of the Kalandars.
