= List of bus stations in Karnataka =

Karnataka State Road Transport Corporation, abbreviated and better known as KSRTC is a state-owned public road transport company in the Indian state of Karnataka.

== List of existing Government Bus stations in Karnataka by Transport Corporation ==
=== KSRTC ===
| Sl | Name of the Bus station | Division | District | District/ Taluk / Hobli | Ref |
|---|---|---|---|---|---|
| 1 | Chintamani | Chikballapur | Chikkaballapura | Taluk | |
| 2 | Chikballapur | Chikballapur | Chikkaballapura | District | |
| 3 | Bagepalli | Chikballapur | Chikkaballapura | Taluk | |
| 4 | Gauribidanur | Chikballapur | Chikkaballapura | Taluk | |
| 5 | Shidlaghatta | Chikballapur | Chikkaballapura | Taluk | |
| 6 | Gudibande | Chikballapur | Chikkaballapura | Taluk | |
| 7 | Doddaballapur | Chikballapur | Bangalore Rural | Taluk | |
| 8 | Kempegowda Bus Station - 1 | Bangalore Central | Bangalore Urban | State Capital | |
| 9 | Kempegowda Bus Station - 2 | Bangalore Central | Bangalore Urban | State Capital | |
| 10 | Kempegowda Bus Station - 2A | Bangalore Central | Bangalore Urban | State Capital | |
| 12 | Kempegowda Bus Station - 3 | Bangalore Central | Bangalore Urban | State Capital | |
| 13 | Mysuru Road Bus Station | Bangalore Central | Bangalore Urban | State Capital | |
| 14 | Basaveshwara Bus Station | Bangalore Central | Bangalore Urban | State Capital | |
| 15 | Nelamangala | Bangalore Central | Bangalore Urban | State Capital | |
| 16 | Anekal | Ramanagara | Bangalore Urban | Taluk | |
| 17 | Channapatna | Ramanagara | Ramanagara | Taluk | |
| 18 | Harohalli | Ramanagara | Ramanagara | Hobli | |
| 19 | Kanakapura | Ramanagara | Ramanagara | Taluk | |
| 20 | Magadi | Ramanagara | Ramanagara | Taluk | |
| 21 | Ramanagara | Ramanagara | Ramanagara | District | |
| 22 | Sathanuru | Ramanagara | Ramanagara | Hobli | |
| 23 | Chamarajanagar | Chamarajanagar | Chamarajanagar | District | |
| 24 | Gundlupet | Chamarajanagar | Chamarajanagar | Taluk | |
| 25 | Kollegal | Chamarajanagar | Chamarajanagar | Taluk | |
| 26 | Begur | Chamarajanagar | Chamarajanagar | Hobli | |
| 27 | Hanur | Chamarajanagar | Chamarajanagar | Taluk | |
| 28 | MM Hills | Chamarajanagar | Chamarajanagar | Village | |
| 29 | T. Narasipura | Chamarajanagar | Mysore | Taluk | |
| 30 | Nanjangud New | Chamarajanagar | Mysore | Taluk | |
| 31 | Nanjangud Old | Chamarajanagar | Mysore | Taluk | |
| 32 | Mysuru Sub Urban Bus Station | Mysore Rural | Mysore | District | |
| 33 | Saligrama | Mysore Rural | Mysore | Taluk | |
| 34 | Saraguru | Mysore Rural | Mysore | Taluk | |
| 35 | Heggadadevanakote | Mysore Rural | Mysore | Taluk | |
| 36 | Hunsur | Mysore Rural | Mysore | Taluk | |
| 37 | Krishnarajanagara | Mysore Rural | Mysore | Taluk | |
| 38 | Piriyapatna | Mysore Rural | Mysore | Taluk | |
| 39 | Mysore City | Mysore City | Mysore | District | |
| 40 | Kuvempunagar | Mysore City | Mysore | District | |
| 41 | Sathagalli | Mysore City | Mysore | District | |
| 42 | R. S. Naidu Nagar | Mysore City | Mysore | District | |
| 43 | Chamundi Hill | Mysore City | Mysore | District | |
| 44 | Chikmagalur | Chikmagalur | Chikmagalur | District | |
| 45 | Kadur | Chikmagalur | Chikmagalur | Taluk | |
| 46 | Mudigere | Chikmagalur | Chikmagalur | Taluk | |
| 47 | Tarikere | Chikmagalur | Chikmagalur | Taluk | |
| 48 | Birur | Chikmagalur | Chikmagalur | Town | |
| 49 | Kottigehara | Chikmagalur | Chikmagalur | Hobli | |
| 50 | Panchanahalli | Chikmagalur | Chikmagalur | Hobli | |
| 51 | Arsikere | Chikmagalur | Hassan | Taluk | |
| 52 | Belur | Chikmagalur | Hassan | Taluk | |
| 53 | Sakleshpur | Chikmagalur | Hassan | Taluk | |
| 54 | Alur | Chikmagalur | Hassan | Taluk | |
| 55 | Arkalgud | Hassan | Hassan | Taluk | |
| 56 | Channarayapatna | Hassan | Hassan | Taluk | |
| 57 | Shravanabelagola | Hassan | Hassan | Hobli | |
| 58 | Hassan Rural (New) | Hassan | Hassan | District | |
| 59 | Hassan City (Old) | Hassan | Hassan | District | |
| 60 | Holenarasipur | Hassan | Hassan | Taluk | |
| 61 | Ramanathapura | Hassan | Hassan | Hobli | |
| 62 | Konanur | Hassan | Hassan | Hobli | |
| 63 | Gandasi | Hassan | Hassan | Hobli | |
| 64 | Kolar Gold Fields | Kolar | Kolar | Taluk | |
| 65 | Kolar | Kolar | Kolar | District | |
| 66 | Malur | Kolar | Kolar | Taluk | |
| 67 | Bangarpet | Kolar | Kolar | Taluk | |
| 68 | Mulbagal | Kolar | Kolar | Taluk | |
| 69 | Srinivasapura New | Kolar | Kolar | Taluk | |
| 70 | Srinivasapura Old | Kolar | Kolar | Taluk | |
| 71 | Krishnarajapet | Mandya | Mandya | Taluk | |
| 72 | Maddur | Mandya | Mandya | Taluk | |
| 73 | Malavalli | Mandya | Mandya | Taluk | |
| 74 | Mandya | Mandya | Mandya | Taluk | |
| 75 | Nagamangala | Mandya | Mandya | Taluk | |
| 76 | Pandavapura | Mandya | Mandya | Taluk | |
| 77 | Srirangapatna | Mandya | Mandya | Taluk | |
| 78 | Adichunchanagiri | Mandya | Mandya | Hobli | |
| 79 | Chinakurali | Mandya | Mandya | Hobli | |
| 80 | Halaguru | Mandya | Mandya | Hobli | |
| 81 | Kikkeri | Mandya | Mandya | Hobli | |
| 82 | Bannur | Mandya | Mysore | Hobli | |
| 83 | Somwarpet | Puttur | Kodagu | Taluk | |
| 84 | Kushalnagar | Puttur | Kodagu | Taluk | |
| 85 | Virajpet | Puttur | Kodagu | Taluk | |
| 86 | Madikeri | Puttur | Kodagu | District | |
| 87 | BC Road | Puttur | Dakshina Kannada | Village | |
| 88 | Puttur | Puttur | Dakshina Kannada | Taluk | |
| 89 | Sullia | Puttur | Dakshina Kannada | Taluk | |
| 90 | Kukke Subrahmanya | Puttur | Dakshina Kannada | Village | |
| 91 | Bantval | Puttur | Dakshina Kannada | Taluk | |
| 92 | Belthangady | Puttur | Dakshina Kannada | Taluk | |
| 93 | Dharmasthala | Mangalore | Dakshina Kannada | Village | |
| 94 | Mangaluru | Mangalore | Dakshina Kannada | District | |
| 95 | Mudabidri | Mangalore | Dakshina Kannada | Taluk | |
| 96 | Kundapura | Mangalore | Udupi | Taluk | |
| 97 | Udupi | Mangalore | Udupi | Taluk | |
| 98 | Karkal | Mangalore | Udupi | Taluk | |
| 99 | Kunigal | Tumkur | Tumakuru | Taluk | |
| 100 | Sira | Tumkur | Tumakuru | Taluk | |
| 101 | Tiptur | Tumkur | Tumakuru | Taluk | |
| 102 | Tumkur | Tumkur | Tumakuru | District | |
| 103 | Chikkanayakanahalli | Tumkur | Tumakuru | Taluk | |
| 104 | Turuvekere | Tumkur | Tumakuru | Taluk | |
| 105 | Madhugiri | Tumkur | Tumakuru | Taluk | |
| 106 | Gubbi | Tumkur | Tumakuru | Taluk | |
| 107 | Koratagere | Tumkur | Tumakuru | Taluk | |
| 108 | Pavagada | Chitradurga | Tumakuru | Taluk | |
| 109 | Sira | Chitradurga | Tumakuru | Taluk | |
| 110 | Hiriyur | Chitradurga | Chitradurga | Taluk | |
| 111 | Chitradurga | Chitradurga | Chitradurga | District | |
| 112 | Challakere | Chitradurga | Chitradurga | Taluk | |
| 113 | Hosadurga | Chitradurga | Chitradurga | Taluk | |
| 114 | Davanagere | Davanagere | Davanagere | District | |
| 115 | Harihar | Davanagere | Davanagere | Taluk | |
| 116 | Jagalur | Davanagere | Davanagere | Taluk | |
| 117 | Sagar | Shimoga | Shimoga | District | |
| 118 | Shimoga | Shimoga | Shimoga | Taluk | |
| 119 | Bhadravati | Shimoga | Shimoga | Taluk | |
| 120 | Honnali | Shimoga | Shimoga | Taluk | |
| 121 | Shikaripura | Shimoga | Shimoga | Taluk | |
| 122 | Soraba | Shimoga | Shimoga | Taluk | |

=== KKRTC ===
| Sl | Name of the Bus station | Division | District | District/ Taluk / Hobli | Ref |
|---|---|---|---|---|---|
| 1 | Hosapete | Hospet | Vijayanagara | District | |
| 2 | Harapanahalli | Hospet | Vijayanagara | Taluk | |
| 3 | Kudligi | Hospet | Vijayanagara | Taluk | |
| 4 | Hadagali | Hospet | Vijayanagara | Taluk | |
| 5 | Hagaribommanahalli | Hospet | Vijayanagara | Hobli | |
| 6 | Kottur | Hospet | Vijayanagara | Taluk | |
| 7 | Sandur | Bellary | Bellary | Taluk | |
| 8 | Holalu | Hospet | Vijayanagara | Hobli | |
| 9 | Itagi | Hospet | Vijayanagara | Hobli | |
| 10 | Hirehadagali | Hospet | Vijayanagara | Hobli | |
| 11 | Mylar | Hospet | Vijayanagara | Hobli | |
| 12 | Moragere | Hospet | Vijayanagara | Village | |
| 13 | Bennihalli | Hospet | Vijayanagara | Village | |
| 14 | Sogi | Hospet | Vijayanagara | Hobli | |
| 15 | Nelakudri | Hospet | Vijayanagara | Hobli | |
| 16 | Khanahosalli | Hospet | Vijayanagara | Hobli | |
| 17 | Ujani | Hospet | Vijayanagara | Hobli | |
| 18 | Telagi | Hospet | Vijayanagara | Hobli | |
| 19 | Mariyammanhalli | Hospet | Vijayanagara | Village | |
| 20 | Kampli | Bellary | Bellary | Taluk | |
| 21 | Chigatageri | Hospet | Vijayanagara | Village | |
| 22 | Halavagalu | Hospet | Vijayanagara | Village | |
| 23 | Holgundi | Hospet | Vijayanagara | Village | |
| 24 | Ballari Rural Bus Stand | Bellary | Bellary | District | |
| 25 | Sirguppa | Bellary | Bellary | Taluk | |
| 26 | Ballari Central Bus Stand | Bellary | Bellary | District | |
| 27 | Tekkalkote | Bellary | Bellary | Hobli | |
| 28 | Kurugod | Bellary | Bellary | Hobli | |
| 29 | Kuditini | Bellary | Bellary | Hobli | |
| 30 | Moka | Bellary | Bellary | Village | |
| 31 | Bidar Rural | Bidar | Bidar | District | |
| 32 | Manna-E-khelli | Bidar | Bidar | Hobli | |
| 33 | Humanabad | Bidar | Bidar | Taluk | |
| 34 | Chitaguppa | Bidar | Bidar | Hobli | |
| 35 | Basavakalyan | Bidar | Bidar | Taluk | |
| 36 | Bhalki | Bidar | Bidar | Taluk | |
| 37 | Aurad | Bidar | Bidar | Taluk | |
| 38 | Bidar city | Bidar | Bidar | District | |
| 39 | Santpur | Bidar | Bidar | Hobli | |
| 40 | Thanakusnur | Bidar | Bidar | Hobli | |
| 41 | Chintaki | Bidar | Bidar | Hobli | |
| 42 | Mudhol(B) | Bidar | Bidar | Village | |
| 43 | Hulsur | Bidar | Bidar | Taluk | |
| 44 | Hudagi | Bidar | Bidar | Village | |
| 45 | Hallikhed(B) | Bidar | Bidar | Village | |
| 46 | Kamal Nagar | Bidar | Bidar | Taluk | |
| 47 | Mudabi | Bidar | Bidar | Village | |
| 48 | Bagadal | Bidar | Bidar | Village | |
| 49 | Super Market | Gulbarga-1 | Kalaburagi | District | |
| 50 | Chittapur | Gulbarga-1 | Kalaburagi | Taluk | |
| 51 | Chincholi | Gulbarga-1 | Kalaburagi | Taluk | |
| 52 | Sedam | Gulbarga-1 | Kalaburagi | Taluk | |
| 53 | Kalagi | Gulbarga-1 | Kalaburagi | Taluk | |
| 54 | Shahabad | Gulbarga-1 | Kalaburagi | Taluk | |
| 55 | Kalaburagi University | Gulbarga-1 | Kalaburagi | District | |
| 56 | Kalaburagi Railway Station | Gulbarga-1 | Kalaburagi | District | |
| 57 | S.T.B.T. Bus stand | Gulbarga-1 | Kalaburagi | District | |
| 58 | Sulepeth | Gulbarga-1 | Kalaburagi | Hobli | |
| 59 | Kamalapur | Gulbarga-1 | Kalaburagi | Taluk | |
| 60 | Mahagaon | Gulbarga-1 | Kalaburagi | Hobli | |
| 61 | Malakhed | Gulbarga-1 | Kalaburagi | Hobli | |
| 62 | Mudhol | Gulbarga-1 | Kalaburagi | Hobli | |
| 63 | Chimmanchod | Gulbarga-1 | Kalaburagi | Village | |
| 64 | Konchavaram | Gulbarga-1 | Kalaburagi | Village | |
| 65 | Kodla | Gulbarga-1 | Kalaburagi | Village | |
| 66 | Central Bus stand Kalaburagi | Gulbarga-2 | Kalaburagi | District | |
| 67 | Afzalpur | Gulbarga-2 | Kalaburagi | Taluk | |
| 68 | Åland | Gulbarga-2 | Kalaburagi | Taluk | |
| 69 | Jewargi | Gulbarga-2 | Kalaburagi | Taluk | |
| 70 | Chowdapur | Gulbarga-2 | Kalaburagi | Hobli | |
| 71 | Deval Ganagapur | Gulbarga-2 | Kalaburagi | Hobli | |
| 72 | Kadaganchi | Gulbarga-2 | Kalaburagi | Hobli | |
| 73 | Madan Hipparaga | Gulbarga-2 | Kalaburagi | Hobli | |
| 74 | Kadaganchi | Gulbarga-2 | Kalaburagi | Hobli | |
| 75 | Ganagapur Station | Gulbarga-2 | Kalaburagi | Hobli | |
| 76 | Yedrami | Gulbarga-2 | Kalaburagi | Hobli | |
| 77 | Ijeri | Gulbarga-2 | Kalaburagi | Hobli | |
| 78 | Nimbaraga | Gulbarga-2 | Kalaburagi | Hobli | |
| 79 | Koppal | Koppal | Koppal | District | |
| 80 | Kushtagi | Koppal | Koppal | Taluk | |
| 81 | Yelburga | Koppal | Koppal | Taluk | |
| 82 | Gangavati | Koppal | Koppal | Taluk | |
| 83 | Hanumasagar | Koppal | Koppal | Village | |
| 84 | Tawargeri | Koppal | Koppal | Village | |
| 85 | Kanakagiri | Koppal | Koppal | Village | |
| 86 | Alavandi | Koppal | Koppal | Village | |
| 87 | Kuknur | Koppal | Koppal | Village | |
| 88 | Karatagi | Koppal | Koppal | Village | |
| 89 | Navamangalor | Koppal | Koppal | Village | |
| 90 | Talakal | Koppal | Koppal | Village | |
| 91 | Hiresindhogi | Koppal | Koppal | Village | |
| 92 | Hanumnal | Koppal | Koppal | Village | |
| 93 | Bannikoppa | Koppal | Koppal | Hobli | |
| 94 | Bisaralli | Koppal | Koppal | Hobli | |
| 95 | Munirabad | Koppal | Koppal | Hobli | |
| 96 | Siddapur | Koppal | Koppal | Hobli | |
| 97 | Kataraki Gudlanur | Koppal | Koppal | Hobli | |
| 98 | Irakalgada | Koppal | Koppal | Hobli | |
| 99 | Hosalingapur | Koppal | Koppal | Hobli | |
| 100 | Gunnal | Koppal | Koppal | Hobli | |
| 101 | Masab Hanchinal | Koppal | Koppal | Hobli | |
| 102 | Talkeri | Koppal | Koppal | Hobli | |
| 103 | Kavalur | Koppal | Koppal | Hobli | |
| 104 | Hitnal | Koppal | Koppal | Hobli | |
| 105 | Kinnal | Koppal | Koppal | Village | |
| 106 | Raichur | Raichur | Raichur | District | |
| 107 | Sindhanoor | Raichur | Raichur | Taluk | |
| 108 | Manvi | Raichur | Raichur | Taluk | |
| 109 | Devadurga | Raichur | Raichur | Taluk | |
| 110 | Lingasugur | Raichur | Raichur | Taluk | |
| 111 | Arakera | Raichur | Raichur | Hobli | |
| 112 | Mudgal | Raichur | Raichur | Taluk | |
| 113 | Sirwar | Raichur | Raichur | Hobli | |
| 114 | Maski | Raichur | Raichur | Hobli | |
| 115 | Gillesugur | Raichur | Raichur | Hobli | |
| 116 | Gabbur | Raichur | Raichur | Hobli | |
| 117 | Kavital | Raichur | Raichur | Taluk | |
| 118 | Hatti | Raichur | Raichur | Taluk | |
| 119 | Jalahalli | Raichur | Raichur | Hobli | |
| 120 | Yadgiri Rural | Yadgir | Yadgir | District | |
| 121 | Gurumithakal | Yadgir | Yadgir | Taluk | |
| 122 | Shahapur | Yadgir | Yadgir | Taluk | |
| 123 | Surpur | Yadgir | Yadgir | Taluk | |
| 124 | Shahapur New | Yadgir | Yadgir | Taluk | |
| 125 | Yadgir city | Yadgir | Yadgir | District | |
| 126 | Saidapur | Yadgir | Yadgir | Hobli | |
| 127 | Hattigudur | Yadgir | Yadgir | Hobli | |
| 128 | Hunasagi | Yadgir | Yadgir | Hobli | |
| 129 | Narayanpur | Yadgir | Yadgir | Hobli | |
| 130 | Malla b | Yadgir | Yadgir | Hobli | |
| 131 | Wadagera | Yadgir | Yadgir | Hobli | |
| 132 | Mudhol | Yadgir | Yadgir | Hobli | |
| 133 | Kembhavi | Yadgir | Yadgir | Hobli | |
| 134 | Sagar | Yadgir | Yadgir | Hobli | |
| 135 | Vijaypura | Vijayapura | Vijayapura | District | |
| 136 | Sidagi | Vijayapura | Vijayapura | Taluk | |
| 137 | Indi | Vijayapura | Vijayapura | Taluk | |
| 138 | Muddebihal | Vijayapura | Vijayapura | Taluk | |
| 139 | B.Bagewadi | Vijayapura | Vijayapura | Taluk | |
| 140 | Babaleshwar | Vijayapura | Vijayapura | Taluk | |
| 141 | Talikota | Vijayapura | Vijayapura | Taluk | |
| 142 | Devara Hipparagi | Vijayapura | Vijayapura | Taluk | |
| 143 | Almel | Vijayapura | Vijayapura | Taluk | |
| 144 | Zalaki | Vijayapura | Vijayapura | Hobli | |
| 145 | Chadachan | Vijayapura | Vijayapura | Taluk | |
| 146 | Talikoti | Vijayapura | Vijayapura | Hobli | |
| 147 | Huvina Hipparagi | Vijayapura | Vijayapura | Hobli | |
| 148 | Kolhar | Vijayapura | Vijayapura | Taluk | |
| 149 | Nalvatwad | Vijayapura | Vijayapura | Hobli | |
| 150 | Kalakiri | Vijayapura | Vijayapura | Hobli | |
| 151 | Korawar | Vijayapura | Vijayapura | Village | |
| 152 | Shivanagi | Vijayapura | Vijayapura | Village | |
| 153 | Managuli | Vijayapura | Vijayapura | Village | |
| 154 | Nidgundi | Vijayapura | Vijayapura | Village | |

=== NWKRTC ===
| Sl | Name of the Bus station | Division | District | District/ Taluk / Hobli | Ref |
|---|---|---|---|---|---|
| 1 | Badami | Bagalkot | Bagalkote | | |
| 2 | Bagalkot | Bagalkot | Bagalkote | | |
| 3 | Bagalakote Navanagar | Bagalkot | Bagalkote | | |
| 4 | Bilagi | Bagalkot | Bagalkote | | |
| 5 | Guledgudda | Bagalkot | Bagalkote | | |
| 6 | Hungund | Bagalkot | Bagalkote | | |
| 7 | Ilkal | Bagalkot | Bagalkote | | |
| 8 | Jamakhandi | Bagalkot | Bagalkote | | |
| 9 | Mudhol | Bagalkot | Bagalkote | | |
| 10 | Belgaum-1 | Belgaum | Belagavi | | |
| 11 | Belgaum-2 | Belgaum | Belagavi | | |
| 12 | Belagavi CBT | Belgaum | Belagavi | | |
| 13 | Belagavi Bogarves | Belgaum | Belagavi | | |
| 14 | Belagavi DWS Gate | Belgaum | Belagavi | | |
| 15 | Kittur | Belgaum | Belagavi | | |
| 16 | Khanapur | Belgaum | Belagavi | | |
| 17 | Bailhongal | Belgaum | Belagavi | | |
| 18 | Ramadurga | Belgaum | Belagavi | | |
| 19 | Athani | Chikkodi | Belagavi | | |
| 20 | Chikkodi | Chikkodi | Belagavi | | |
| 21 | Gokak | Chikkodi | Belagavi | | |
| 22 | Hukkeri | Chikkodi | Belagavi | | |
| 23 | Nippani | Chikkodi | Belagavi | | |
| 24 | Raibag | Chikkodi | Belagavi | | |
| 25 | Sankeshwar | Chikkodi | Belagavi | | |
| 26 | Kagawad | Chikkodi | Belagavi | | |
| 27 | Savadatti | Dharwad Rural | Belagavi | | |
| 28 | Dharwad Mofussil (New) | Dharwad Rural | Belagavi | | |
| 29 | Dharwad City | Dharwad Rural | Dharwad | | |
| 30 | Uppin Betageri | Dharwad Rural | Dharwad | | |
| 31 | Hebballi | Dharwad Rural | Dharwad | | |
| 32 | Munavalli | Dharwad Rural | Dharwad | | |
| 33 | Yaragatti | Dharwad Rural | Dharwad | | |
| 34 | Alnavar | Dharwad Rural | Dharwad | | |
| 35 | Joida | Dharwad Rural | Dharwad | | |
| 36 | Dandeli | Dharwad Rural | Uttara Kannada | | |
| 37 | Haliyal | Dharwad Rural | Uttara Kannada | | |
| 38 | Ramnagar | Dharwad Rural | Uttara Kannada | | |
| 39 | Hubli BRTS | Hubli Dharwad City | Dharwad | | |
| 40 | Dharwad BRTS | Hubli Dharwad City | Dharwad | | |
| 41 | Hubli New | Hubli Rural | Dharwad | | |
| 42 | Hubli Old | Hubli Rural | Dharwad | | |
| 43 | Kundgol | Hubli Rural | Dharwad | | |
| 44 | Navalgund | Hubli Rural | Dharwad | | |
| 45 | Saunshi | Hubli Rural | Dharwad | | |
| 46 | Tadas | Hubli Rural | Dharwad | | |
| 47 | Kalghatagi | Hubli Rural | Dharwad | | |
| 48 | Betageri | Gadag | Gadag | | |
| 49 | Gadag New | Gadag | Gadag | | |
| 50 | Gadag Old | Gadag | Gadag | | |
| 51 | Gajendragad | Gadag | Gadag | | |
| 52 | Laxmeshwar | Gadag | Gadag | | |
| 53 | Mundargi | Gadag | Gadag | | |
| 54 | Naragund | Gadag | Gadag | | |
| 55 | Ron | Gadag | Gadag | | |
| 56 | Shirahatti | Gadag | Gadag | | |
| 57 | Byadgi | Haveri | Haveri | | |
| 58 | Hanagal | Haveri | Haveri | | |
| 59 | Haveri | Haveri | Haveri | | |
| 60 | Hirekerur | Haveri | Haveri | | |
| 61 | Ranebennur | Haveri | Haveri | | |
| 62 | Savanur | Haveri | Haveri | | |
| 63 | Shiggaon | Haveri | Haveri | | |
| 64 | Bankapura | Haveri | Haveri | | |
| 65 | Guttal | Haveri | Haveri | | |
| 66 | Sirsi New | Uttara Kannada (Sirsi) | Uttara Kannada | | |
| 67 | Sirsi Old | Uttara Kannada (Sirsi) | Uttara Kannada | | |
| 68 | Karwar | Uttara Kannada (Sirsi) | Uttara Kannada | | |
| 69 | Ankola | Uttara Kannada (Sirsi) | Uttara Kannada | | |
| 70 | Bhatkal | Uttara Kannada (Sirsi) | Uttara Kannada | | |
| 71 | Kumta | Uttara Kannada (Sirsi) | Uttara Kannada | | |
| 72 | Yellapur | Uttara Kannada (Sirsi) | Uttara Kannada | | |
| 73 | Siddapur | Uttara Kannada (Sirsi) | Uttara Kannada | | |
| 74 | Banavasi | Uttara Kannada (Sirsi) | Uttara Kannada | | |
| 75 | Honnavar | Uttara Kannada (Sirsi) | Uttara Kannada | | |
| 76 | Gokarna | Uttara Kannada (Sirsi) | Uttara Kannada | | |
| 77 | Murudeshwar | Uttara Kannada (Sirsi) | Uttara Kannada | | |
| 78 | Mundagod | Uttara Kannada (Sirsi) | Uttara Kannada | | |

=== BMTC ===
| Sl | Bus Stand Name | TTMC/Bus Station |
|---|---|---|
| 1 | Kempegowda Bus Station | Major Bus Station |
| 2 | Shivajinagar | Major Bus Station |
| 3 | Atal Bihari Vajpayee TTMC (Shanthinagar) | TTMC |
| 4 | Jayanagar | TTMC |
| 5 | Kengeri | TTMC |
| 6 | Banashankari TTMC | TTMC |
| 7 | Koramangala | TTMC |
| 8 | Yeshawanthapura | TTMC |
| 9 | Vijayanagar | TTMC |
| 10 | Domlur | TTMC |
| 11 | Whitefield | TTMC |
| 12 | Bannerghatta | TTMC |
| 13 | Austin Town | Bus Station |
| 14 | Basaweshwaranagar | Bus Station |
| 15 | Bidadi | Bus Station |
| 16 | Chennammanakere Achukattu | Bus Station |
| 17 | Chandra Layout | Bus Station |
| 18 | Electronic City | Bus Station |
| 19 | ISRO Layout | Bus Station |
| 20 | Hesaraghatta | Bus Station |
| 21 | Hosakerehalli | Bus Station |
| 22 | Jeevanabhimanagar | Bus Station |
| 23 | Jigani | Bus Station |
| 24 | Kadugodi | Bus Station |
| 25 | Kalyanagar | Bus Station |
| 26 | Kavalabyrasandra | Bus Station |
| 27 | Kumaraswamy Layout | Bus Station |
| 28 | Laggere | Bus Station |
| 29 | Malleshwaram | Bus Station |
| 30 | N R Colony | Bus Station |
| 31 | Nagarabhavi | Bus Station |
| 32 | Nandini layout | Bus Station |
| 33 | Rajarajeshwarinagar | Bus Station |
| 34 | RPC Layout | Bus Station |
| 35 | Singapura | Bus Station |
| 36 | Vidyaranyapura | Bus Station |
| 37 | Yelahanka 5th Phase | Bus Station |
| 38 | Yelahanka New Town | Bus Station |
| 39 | Yelahanka Old Town | Bus Station |
| 40 | Mysuru Road Bus Station | Bus Station |

== See also ==
- List of bus depots in Karnataka
- Karnataka State Road Transport Corporation (KSRTC)
- Bengaluru Metropolitan Transport Corporation (BMTC)
- North Western Karnataka Road Transport Corporation (NWKRTC)
- Kalyana Karnataka Road Transport Corporation (KKRTC)
