= Kudathini =

- village
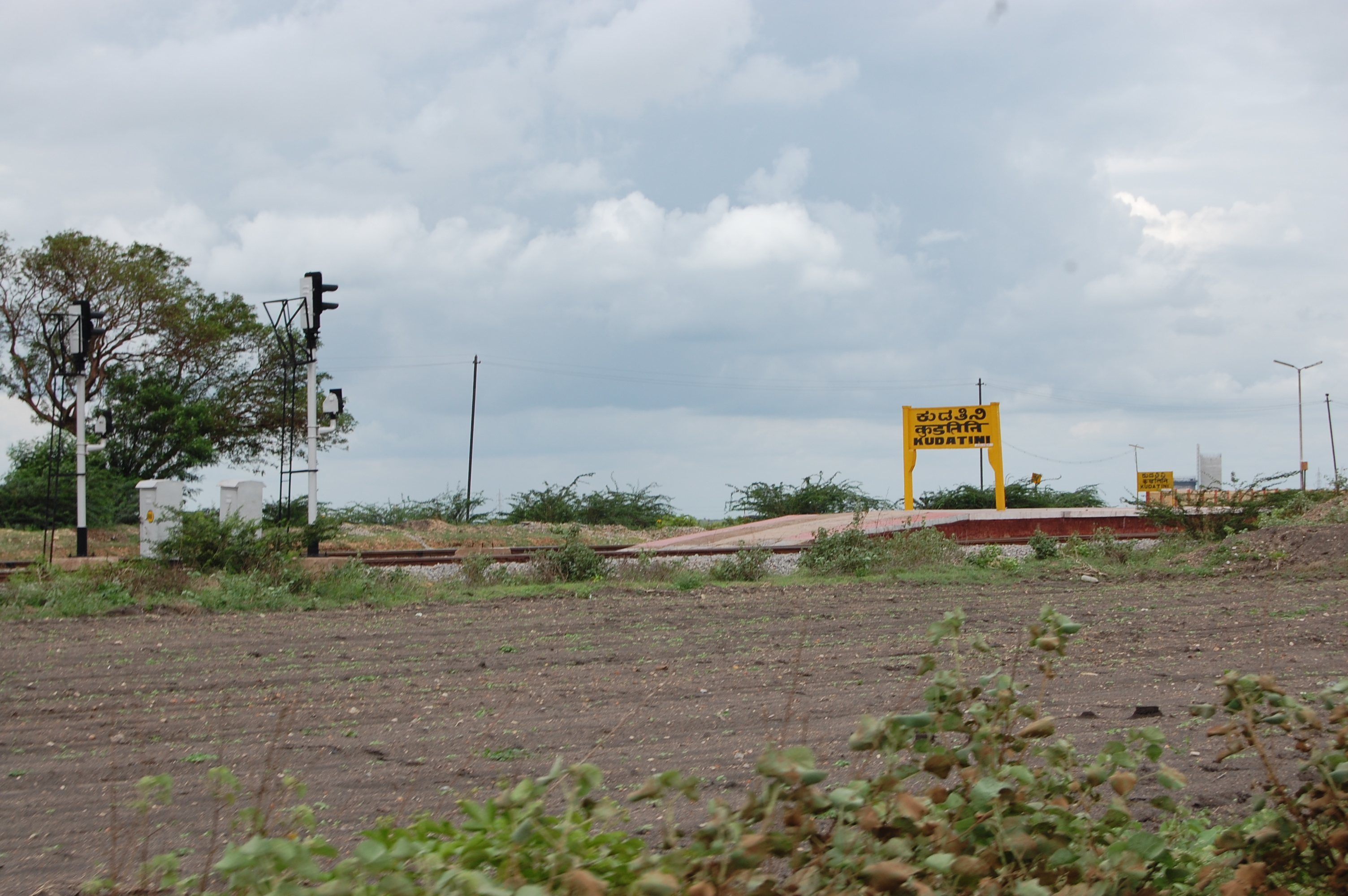
- Kudathini railway station

- Location in Karnataka, India Kudathini (India)
- Coordinates: 15.15°N 76.92°E
- Country: India
- State: Karnataka
- District: Bellary
- Talukas: Bellary

Government
  - Body: Gram panchayat

Population (2001)
  - Total: 18,205

Languages
  - Official: Kannada
- Time zone: UTC+5:30 (IST)
- ISO 3166 code: IN-KA
- Vehicle registration: KA
- Website: karnataka.gov.in

Kudathini is a village in the Bellary taluk of Bellary district in Karnataka.

== Demographics ==
As of 2001 India census, Kudathini had a population of 12247 with 6333 males and 5914 females.

== Transportation ==
Kudatini railway station is the nearest railway connection of the village located on the Guntakal–Vasco da Gama section.

The village is connected to the Ballari-Hubballi road.

== See also ==
- Bellary
- Districts of Karnataka
