= Siruguppa Assembly constituency =

Legislative Assembly constituency in Karnataka State, India

Coordinates: 15.63°N 76.9°E

Siruguppa
- Constituency No. 92 for the Karnataka Legislative Assembly

Constituency details
- Country: India
- Region: South India
- State: Karnataka
- District: Ballari
- Lok Sabha constituency: Koppal
- Established: 1951
- Total electors: 217,209
- Reservation: ST

Member of Legislative Assembly
- 16th Karnataka Legislative Assembly
- Incumbent B. M. Nagaraja
- Party: Indian National Congress
- Elected year: 2023
- Preceded by: M. S. Somalingappa

Siruguppa Assembly constituency is one of the 224 Legislative Assembly constituencies of Karnataka in India.

It is part of Ballari district and is reserved for candidates belonging to the Scheduled Tribes. B. M. Nagaraja is the current MLA from Siruguppa.

== Members of the Legislative Assembly ==
Election	Member	Party
1952	S. Parameswarappa	Indian National Congress
1957	B. E. Ramaiah	Indian National Congress
1962	C. M. Revana Siddaiah	Swatantra Party
1967	M. D. Gowd	Indian National Congress
1972	B. E. Ramaiah	Indian National Congress
1978	B. E. Ramaiah	Indian National Congress
1983	M. Shankar Reddy	Indian National Congress
1985	C. M. Revana Siddaiah	Janata Party
1989	M. Shankar Reddy	Indian National Congress
1994	T. N. Chandrashekaraiah	Janata Dal
1999	M. Shankar Reddy	Indian National Congress
2004	M. S. Somalingappa	Bharatiya Janata Party
2008	M. S. Somalingappa	Bharatiya Janata Party
2013	B. M. Nagaraja	Indian National Congress
2018	M. S. Somalingappa	Bharatiya Janata Party
2023	B. M. Nagaraja	Indian National Congress

== Election results ==
=== Assembly Election 2023 ===
2023 Karnataka Legislative Assembly election : Siruguppa
Party	Candidate	Votes	%	±%
INC	B. M. Nagaraja	90,862	54.05%	▲13.78
BJP	M. S. Somalingappa	53,830	32.02%	▼22.23
KRPP	T. Darappa Naik	18,652	11.10%	New
NOTA	None of the above	1,645	0.98%	▼0.33
Margin of victory		37,032	22.03%	▲8.05
Turnout		168,461	77.56%	▲2.55
Total valid votes		168,106		
Registered electors		217,209		▲6.95
INC gain from BJP		Swing	▼0.20	

=== Assembly Election 2018 ===
2018 Karnataka Legislative Assembly election : Siruguppa
Party	Candidate	Votes	%	±%
BJP	M. S. Somalingappa	82,546	54.25%	▲20.73
INC	B. Murali Krishna	61,275	40.27%	▼9.99
JD(S)	Hosamane. B. Maruthi	2,482	1.63%	▼0.81
NOTA	None of the above	1,997	1.31%	New
Independent	B. M. Venkatesha Nayaka	1,274	0.84%	New
Independent	B. Sreenivas	956	0.63%	New
Margin of victory		21,271	13.98%	▼2.76
Turnout		152,337	75.01%	▲0.45
Total valid votes		152,151		
Registered electors		203,092		▲19.44
BJP gain from INC		Swing	▲3.99	

=== Assembly Election 2013 ===
2013 Karnataka Legislative Assembly election : Siruguppa
Party	Candidate	Votes	%	±%
INC	B. M. Nagaraja	65,490	50.26%	▲16.76
BJP	M. S. Somalingappa	43,676	33.52%	▼4.18
BSRCP	H. M. Mallikarjun	7,272	5.58%	New
JD(S)	B. Eranna	3,183	2.44%	▼20.36
KJP	K. Narasimha Nayaka	2,254	1.73%	New
Independent	B. S. Mallikarjun Nayaka	1,638	1.26%	New
BSP	Nari Mareppa	1,574	1.21%	New
LSP	N. Kalingappa	1,045	0.80%	New
Margin of victory		21,814	16.74%	▲12.55
Turnout		126,788	74.56%	▲0.15
Total valid votes		130,314		
Registered electors		170,039		▲9.98
INC gain from BJP		Swing	▲12.56	

=== Assembly Election 2008 ===
2008 Karnataka Legislative Assembly election : Siruguppa
Party	Candidate	Votes	%	±%
BJP	M. S. Somalingappa	43,359	37.70%	▲2.93
INC	B. M. Nagaraja	38,535	33.50%	▲6.30
JD(S)	Mallikarjuna Balappa. H. M	26,226	22.80%	▼7.50
Independent	Dodda Hanumanthappa Gudivatti	3,409	2.96%	New
Independent	Desai Jadeppa	2,034	1.77%	New
Independent	Dodda Sunkappa. B	1,457	1.27%	New
Margin of victory		4,824	4.19%	▼0.28
Turnout		115,039	74.41%	▲8.54
Total valid votes		115,020		
Registered electors		154,604		▼27.99
BJP hold		Swing	▲2.93	

=== Assembly Election 2004 ===
2004 Karnataka Legislative Assembly election : Siruguppa
Party	Candidate	Votes	%	±%
BJP	M. S. Somalingappa	49,160	34.77%	New
JD(S)	Chedrashekaraiah. T. M	42,844	30.30%	▲22.09
INC	M. Shankar Reddy	38,459	27.20%	▼19.11
JP	Thimmappa. M. K	3,903	2.76%	New
BSP	Harun Sab. B	2,986	2.11%	▲0.99
Independent	Handi Rafiq Sab	2,518	1.78%	New
Kannada Nadu Party	Pampapathi. K	1,515	1.07%	New
Margin of victory		6,316	4.47%	▼16.02
Turnout		141,414	65.87%	▼1.14
Total valid votes		141,385		
Registered electors		214,693		▲17.00
BJP gain from INC		Swing	▼11.54	

=== Assembly Election 1999 ===
1999 Karnataka Legislative Assembly election : Siruguppa
Party	Candidate	Votes	%	±%
INC	M. Shankar Reddy	51,742	46.31%	▲17.82
JD(U)	T. M. Chandrashekhariah	28,843	25.81%	New
Independent	M. S. Somalingappa	19,930	17.84%	New
JD(S)	Pujari Malleshappa	9,169	8.21%	New
BSP	A. Abdul Nabi	1,254	1.12%	New
Independent	Ramadas	803	0.72%	New
Margin of victory		22,899	20.49%	▲11.35
Turnout		122,959	67.01%	▼2.09
Total valid votes		111,741		
Rejected ballots		11,169	9.08%	▲5.18
Registered electors		183,498		▲10.01
INC gain from JD		Swing	▲8.69	

=== Assembly Election 1994 ===
1994 Karnataka Legislative Assembly election : Siruguppa
Party	Candidate	Votes	%	±%
JD	T. N. Chandrashekaraiah	41,673	37.62%	▼3.09
INC	M. Shankar Reddy	31,552	28.49%	▼27.22
INC	H. Ramaiah	14,434	13.03%	New
Independent	B. E. Ramaiah	9,991	9.02%	New
BJP	Ramalingappa	6,894	6.22%	New
KRRS	H. Lakshmikantha Reddy	3,165	2.86%	New
Independent	A. Ramanjinappa	1,176	1.06%	New
Independent	B. Narayana Reddy	918	0.83%	New
Margin of victory		10,121	9.14%	▼5.86
Turnout		115,260	69.10%	▲3.39
Total valid votes		110,766		
Rejected ballots		4,494	3.90%	▼3.13
Registered electors		166,807		▲6.48
JD gain from INC		Swing	▼18.09	

=== Assembly Election 1989 ===
1989 Karnataka Legislative Assembly election : Siruguppa
Party	Candidate	Votes	%	±%
INC	M. Shankar Reddy	53,324	55.71%	▲9.65
JD	T. M. Chandrasekharayya	38,967	40.71%	New
Independent	D. S. Jadeppa	2,132	2.23%	New
Kranti Sabha	Sharanayya	1,287	1.34%	New
Margin of victory		14,357	15.00%	▲11.72
Turnout		102,943	65.71%	▼1.12
Total valid votes		95,710		
Rejected ballots		7,233	7.03%	▲4.07
Registered electors		156,661		▲27.76
INC gain from JP		Swing	▲6.37	

=== Assembly Election 1985 ===
1985 Karnataka Legislative Assembly election : Siruguppa
Party	Candidate	Votes	%	±%
JP	C. M. Revana Siddaiah	39,238	49.34%	New
INC	M. Shankar Reddy	36,626	46.06%	▼22.67
Independent	M. Mareppa	2,704	3.40%	New
Independent	A. Abdul Nabi	957	1.20%	New
Margin of victory		2,612	3.28%	▼35.39
Turnout		81,948	66.83%	▲3.58
Total valid votes		79,525		
Rejected ballots		2,423	2.96%	▼0.81
Registered electors		122,621		▲17.67
JP gain from INC		Swing	▼19.39	

=== Assembly Election 1983 ===
1983 Karnataka Legislative Assembly election : Siruguppa
Party	Candidate	Votes	%	±%
INC	M. Shankar Reddy	43,591	68.73%	▲64.28
Independent	Kenchanaguddada Mallanna Gouda	19,062	30.05%	New
Independent	T. Harishareddy	772	1.22%	New
Margin of victory		24,529	38.67%	▲25.09
Turnout		65,912	63.25%	▼7.60
Total valid votes		63,425		
Rejected ballots		2,487	3.77%	▲0.35
Registered electors		104,208		▲9.15
INC gain from INC(I)		Swing	▲15.97	

=== Assembly Election 1978 ===
1978 Karnataka Legislative Assembly election : Siruguppa
Party	Candidate	Votes	%	±%
INC(I)	B. E. Ramaiah	34,465	52.76%	New
JP	Narayana Swamy. K	25,596	39.18%	New
INC	Rangappa. S. R	2,906	4.45%	▼53.95
Independent	T. Harishareddy	2,360	3.61%	New
Margin of victory		8,869	13.58%	▼3.22
Turnout		67,643	70.85%	▲1.56
Total valid votes		65,327		
Rejected ballots		2,316	3.42%	▲3.42
Registered electors		95,475		▲35.67
INC(I) gain from INC		Swing	▼5.64	

=== Assembly Election 1972 ===
1972 Mysore State Legislative Assembly election : Siruguppa
Party	Candidate	Votes	%	±%
INC	B. E. Ramaiah	27,600	58.40%	▲3.44
INC(O)	M. Doudangowd	19,659	41.60%	New
Margin of victory		7,941	16.80%	▲6.88
Turnout		48,760	69.29%	▼4.40
Total valid votes		47,259		
Registered electors		70,374		▲19.34
INC hold		Swing	▲3.44	

=== Assembly Election 1967 ===
1967 Mysore State Legislative Assembly election : Siruguppa
Party	Candidate	Votes	%	±%
INC	M. D. Gowd	22,563	54.96%	▲19.33
SWA	B. E. Ramaiah	18,489	45.04%	▼16.96
Margin of victory		4,074	9.92%	▼16.45
Turnout		43,451	73.69%	▲5.90
Total valid votes		41,052		
Registered electors		58,968		▲0.69
INC gain from SWA		Swing	▼7.04	

=== Assembly Election 1962 ===
1962 Mysore State Legislative Assembly election : Siruguppa
Party	Candidate	Votes	%	±%
SWA	C. M. Revana Siddaiah	22,517	62.00%	New
INC	H. Linga Reddy	12,940	35.63%	▼24.32
Independent	Basavana Goud	858	2.36%	New
Margin of victory		9,577	26.37%	▲0.43
Turnout		39,702	67.79%	▲11.59
Total valid votes		36,315		
Registered electors		58,566		▲7.46
SWA gain from INC		Swing	▲2.05	

=== Assembly Election 1957 ===
1957 Mysore State Legislative Assembly election : Siruguppa
Party	Candidate	Votes	%	±%
INC	B. E. Ramaiah	18,361	59.95%	▲9.66
PSP	C. M. Revana Siddaiah	10,416	34.01%	New
ABJS	S. Maharudra Gouda	1,850	6.04%	New
Margin of victory		7,945	25.94%	▲16.25
Turnout		30,627	56.20%	▲1.33
Total valid votes		30,627		
Registered electors		54,500		▼15.50
INC hold		Swing	▲9.66	

=== Assembly Election 1952 ===
1952 Madras State Legislative Assembly election : Siruguppa
Party	Candidate	Votes	%	±%
INC	S. Parameswarappa	17,798	50.29%	New
Independent	S. Ranganna Gowd	14,370	40.60%	New
Independent	Hanumantha Gowda	3,224	9.11%	New
Margin of victory		3,428	9.69%	
Turnout		35,392	54.87%	
Total valid votes		35,392		
Registered electors		64,496		
INC win (new seat)				

== See also ==
- List of constituencies of the Karnataka Legislative Assembly
- Ballari district
