= Narsapur, Karnataka =

Narsapura, Karnataka Narsapura
- Village
- Location in Karnataka, India Narsapura, Karnataka (India)
- Coordinates: 15°3′12″N 76°35′56″E
- Country: India
- State: Karnataka
- District: Bellary

Languages
  - Official: Kannada
- Time zone: UTC+5:30 (IST)

Narsapura or Narasingapur is a village, a Gram panchayat in Sandur taluk, Bellary district in the Indian state of Karnataka. It is believed that Ramanamalai and Desai families lived here first. Narsapura was ruled by the Sandur king. A number of iron ore mines surround it. National Mineral Development Corporation(NMDC), is one such Indian public sector undertaking that acquired land from the village farmers to begin Donimalai township in 1969. NMDC allies with Metals and Minerals Trading Corporation of India (MMTC Ltd.) to transport iron from Ranajithpura railway station.
