= Bommghatta =

Bommaghatta
- village
- Location in Karnataka, India Bommaghatta (India)
- Coordinates: 14.933438°N 76.564756°E
- Country: India
- State: Karnataka
- District: Bellary

Government
  - Body: Grama Panchayat

Population (2001)
  - Total: 4,000

Languages
  - Official: Kannada
- Time zone: UTC+5:30 (IST)
- PIN: 583128
- Telephone code: 08395
- Vehicle registration: KA-35, KA-34
- Literacy: 75%%
- Civic agency: Grama Panchayat
- Website: hulikunteraya.org

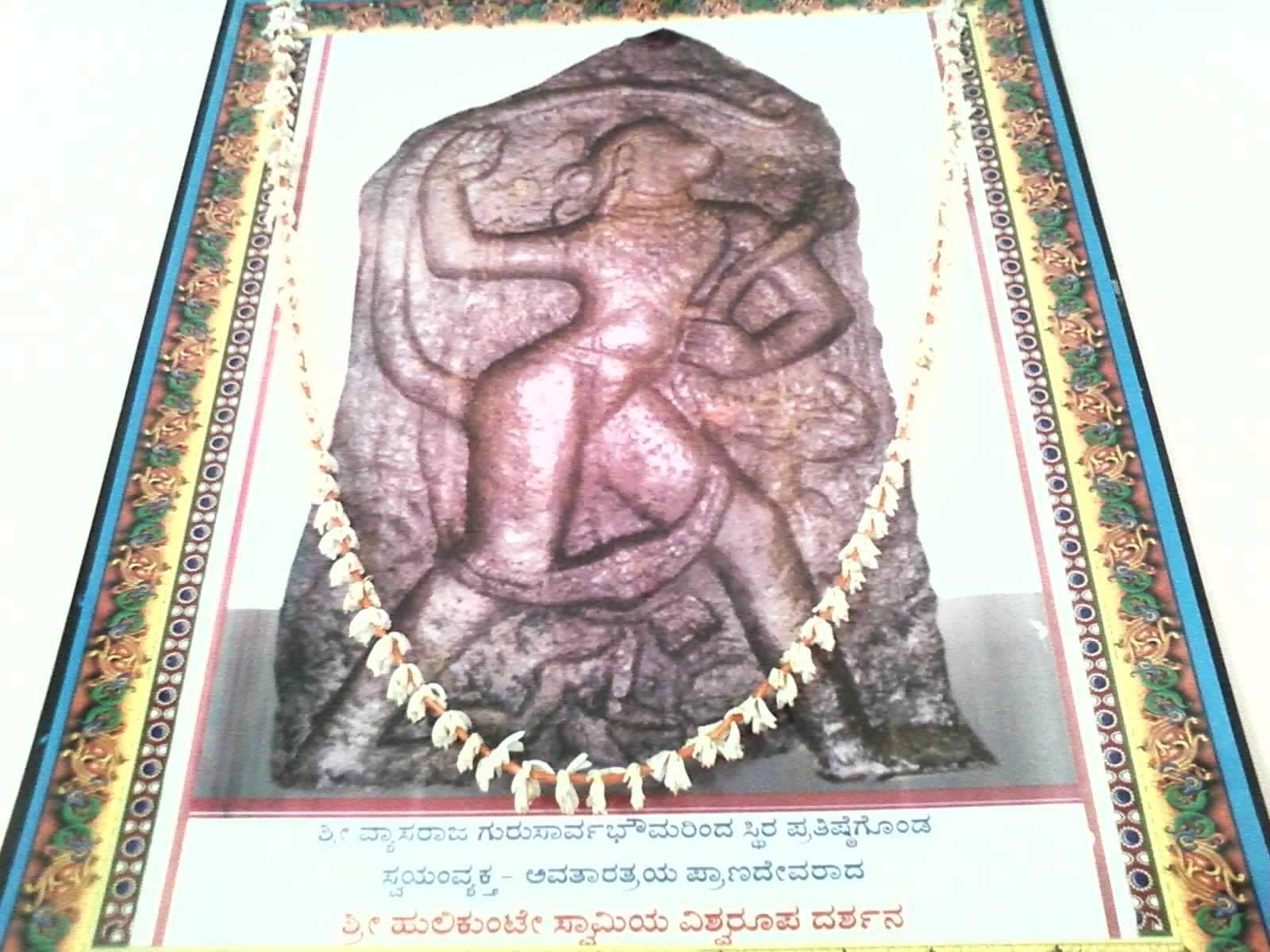
Hulikunteraya

Bommaghatta is a village in the southern state of Karnataka, India. It is located in the Sandur taluk of Bellary district in Karnataka. The place is popular for its Hindu temple which hosts the deity Hanuman as Hulikunteraya. Annually the Rathostava (chariot fest) is scheduled to commence on Phalguna Shukla Dashami (usually in February/March) and thousands of worshippers and tourists from all over India and particularly from the South gather there to witness it.

It is believed that the Hanuman idol is a 'Udbhava' murthi. The cowherd who was taking the cows belonged to Shanbhoge (village incharge) for gazing in the field was tapping this idol stone every day while supervising the cows. The cowherd heard 'Ashareeravani' from stone not to hit it and he carried the message to the Shanbhoge and villagers (named Bommaiah) found this Hanuman idol (pictured) in the field in the grass bush. The villagers decided to bring this idol and instal in the temple specifically built for in Bommaghatta Village. But, while bringing the idol on a cart, the wheel of the cart was broken on the way. Hence, the idol was kept at that place with the help of broken wheel. The same night the Shanbhoge had a dream insisting for installation of the idol at the place where the wheel of the cart was broken. Hence, the villagers decided to instal the idol at this new place. But, there was shortage of money to build the new temple. In the meantime, a trader was carrying salt in bags and his journey was obstructed at this new place during night due to heavy rain. The trader kept salt bags between idol and wheel and prayed lord Hanuman to safeguard the bags from rain. He vowed to help financially to build a shelter to lord Hanuman if his bags were protected from rain. On the next morning to his surprise, the trader found that the bags were protected from rains. The trader informed about the incident to Shanbhoge and informed the villagers that he will build the shelter for lord Hanuman and the present 'Garbhagudi' is the one which was so built. Lord Hanuman also widely known as Mukhya Praana Devaru, thus got a permanent place for worship.

It is believed on one night, the Shanbhoge had a dream to excavate the land near lord Hanuman idol to find gold coins to be spent for building the temple and pond. The next day villagers found markings near idol and decided to have a pond there. While excavating, they found lord Rudra idol and also gold coins. The Rudra idol is also installed in front of the excavated place where there is now the pond known as 'Pushkarani'.

It is believed that the murthi was discovered by a cowherd, named Bommaiah, in a grass bush named Huli-pode and hence the idol got the name Hulikunteraya/Hulikunteswami.

There is also a small Sri Rama temple beside Hulikunteswami temple. The speciality of this temple is that it has an idol of lord Garuda along with Seetha Rama Lakshmana and Hanuman.

Sri Vyasaraja (Sri Krishnadevaraya period) performed the re-installation (punar-pratishtapana) of Hanuman idol.

There has been great expansion of the temple and its surroundings in the last decade due to the generous donations by devotees. The Brahmin association (Sri Hulikunteswami Seva Sangha Regd) (only for Brahmin, nothing to do with temple) is actively involved by carrying out various programmes for a week. The celebration by the seva sangha ends on Phalguna Shukla Dashami on which day the chariot is pulled. The 'mela' for the public commences on this Rathostava day. The 63rd year Adhiveshana was conducted successfully by seva sangha in March 2016. Since three years they are also conducting 'Jnanayagna Shibira' every year during November. It is a three-day programme for the students to learn pooja customs, etc. Talented students (only for Brahmin) are honoured on this occasion.

Arya vysya Sangha which was formed pre-Independence (1942), is actively involved in the development of the temple by donating and raising funds.

Srihulikunteraya first found to cowherd Sri Bommaiah (his family lives near Bommagatta Gollarahatti village ).

== Demographics ==
As of 2001 India census, Bommaghatta had a population of around 4000.

== See also ==
- Bellary
- Districts of Karnataka
