= Chilagodu =

- village
- Location in Karnataka, India Chilagodu (India)
- Coordinates: 15.1275°N 76.1545°E
- Country: India
- State: Karnataka
- District: Vijayanagara

Population
  - Total: 3,500

Languages
  - Official: Kannada
- Time zone: UTC+5:30 (IST)
- Postal code: 583224

Chilagodu is a village in Vijayanagara district in Karnataka.
