= Kurugodu =

Kurugodu Kurugodu
- town
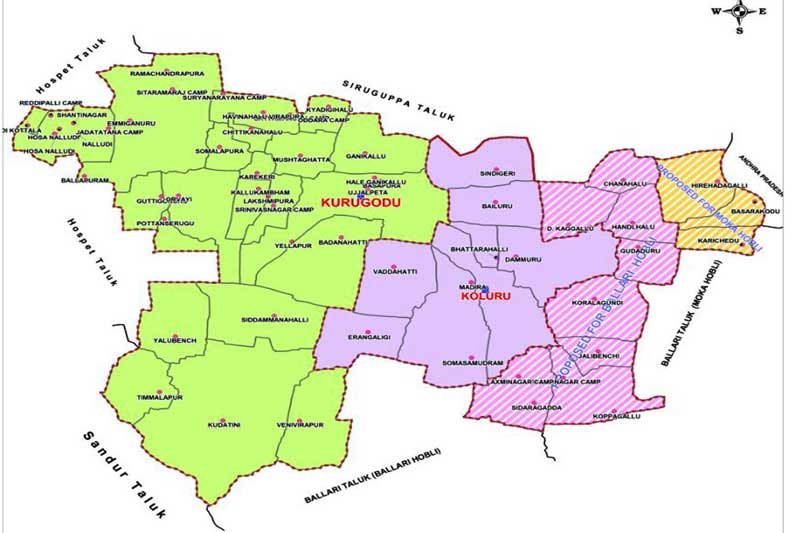
- Kurugodu Taluk Map

- Location in Karnataka, India Kurugodu (India)
- Coordinates: 15.346°N 76.836°E
- Country: India
- State: Karnataka
- District: Bellary
- Talukas: Kurugodu

Population (2001)
  - Total: 17,379

Languages
  - Official: Kannada
- Time zone: UTC+5:30 (IST)
- ISO 3166 code: IN-KA
- Vehicle registration: KA 34
- Website: kurugodutown.mrc.gov.in

Kurugodu is a town in the southern state of Karnataka, India. It is headquarters of Kurugodu taluk in Bellary district of Karnataka. The Sri Dodda Basaveshwara Temple (Big Basava) is located here. Every year Ratha Mahothsava of the Swamy Dodda Basaveshwara held on holy Poornima.

== Name ==
The name Kuṟugōḍu is presumably derived from the Kannada words kuṟu and kōḍu, giving it a meaning "the hill with a small or low top". The name was presumably given in reference to one of the various hills on the north and west sides of the village. The spelling Kuṟugōḍu is attested in several medieval records (see below).

== History ==
In the 1100s, Kurugodu was the site of a prominent hillfort (durga). It is mentioned in lists of fortresses captured by the Hoysala kings Vishnuvardhana and Viraballala II, as well as two separate inscriptions from Kurugodu itself, one on each side of the same stone slab. Inscription A, which unusually starts in Sanskrit before switching into Prakrit and then into Kannada, records four different donations to a temple of Shiva, two of which are dated: one to 6 December 1173 and the other to 24 October 1181. The inscription itself is undated, but according to Lionel Barnett, it was probably made on or shortly after the 1181 date. Inscription B is incomplete and undated, but is dated to the reign of the same ruler as Inscription A: Rachamalla II of the Sinda dynasty. It describes the construction of a temple to Shiva at Kurugodu, and its incomplete part was probably intended to record a donation made to that temple.

The inscriptions identify Kurugodu as part of the contemporary district of Ballakunde (which another inscription identifies as a 300-district within the larger region of Sindavāḍi).

== Demographics ==
Water Map of Kurugodu Taluk

As of 2001 India census, Kurugodu had a population of 17,379 with 8,815 males and 8,564 females.

== Geography ==
- Bellary
- Districts of Karnataka
