= Ballari district =

District of Karnataka State, India

- District
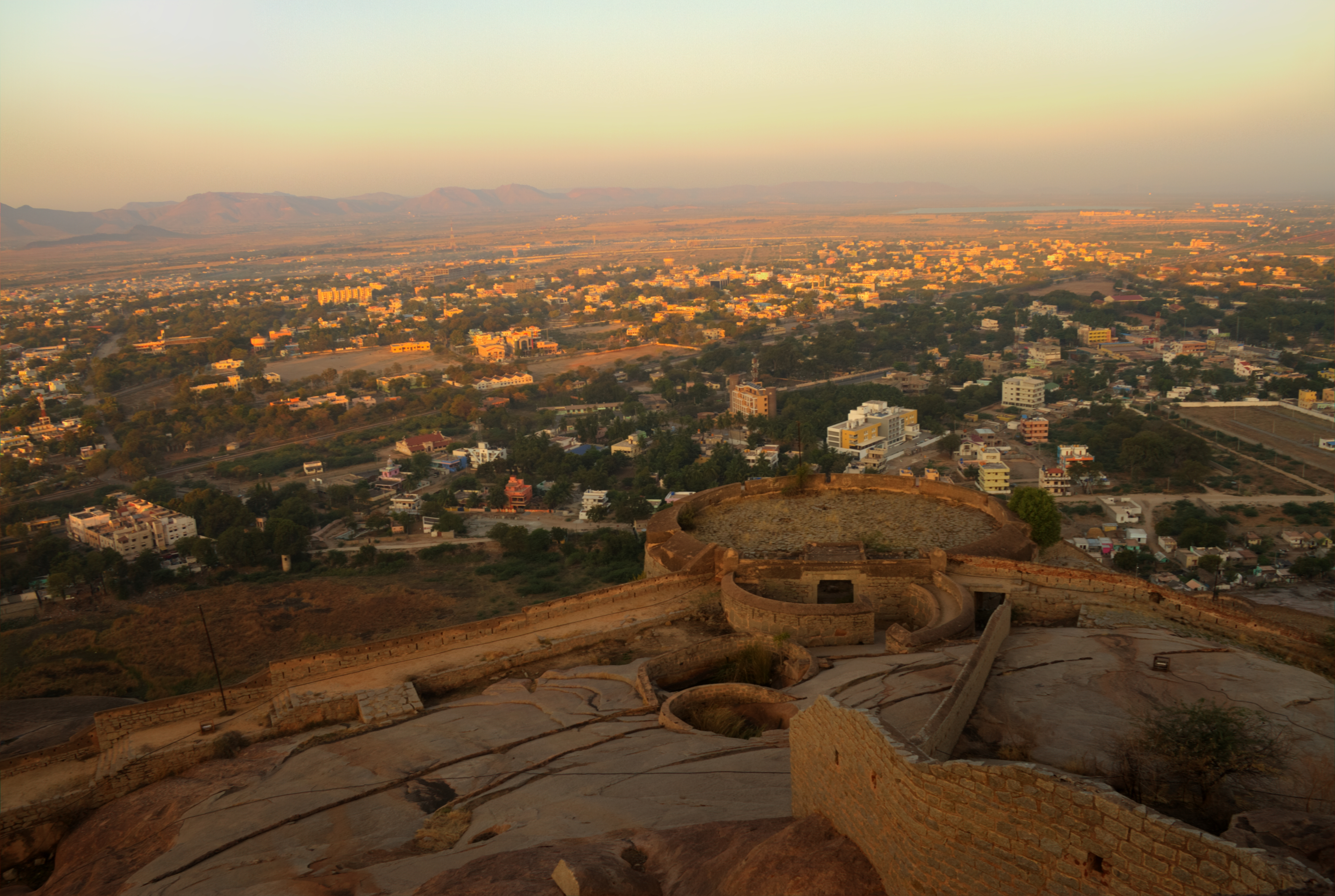
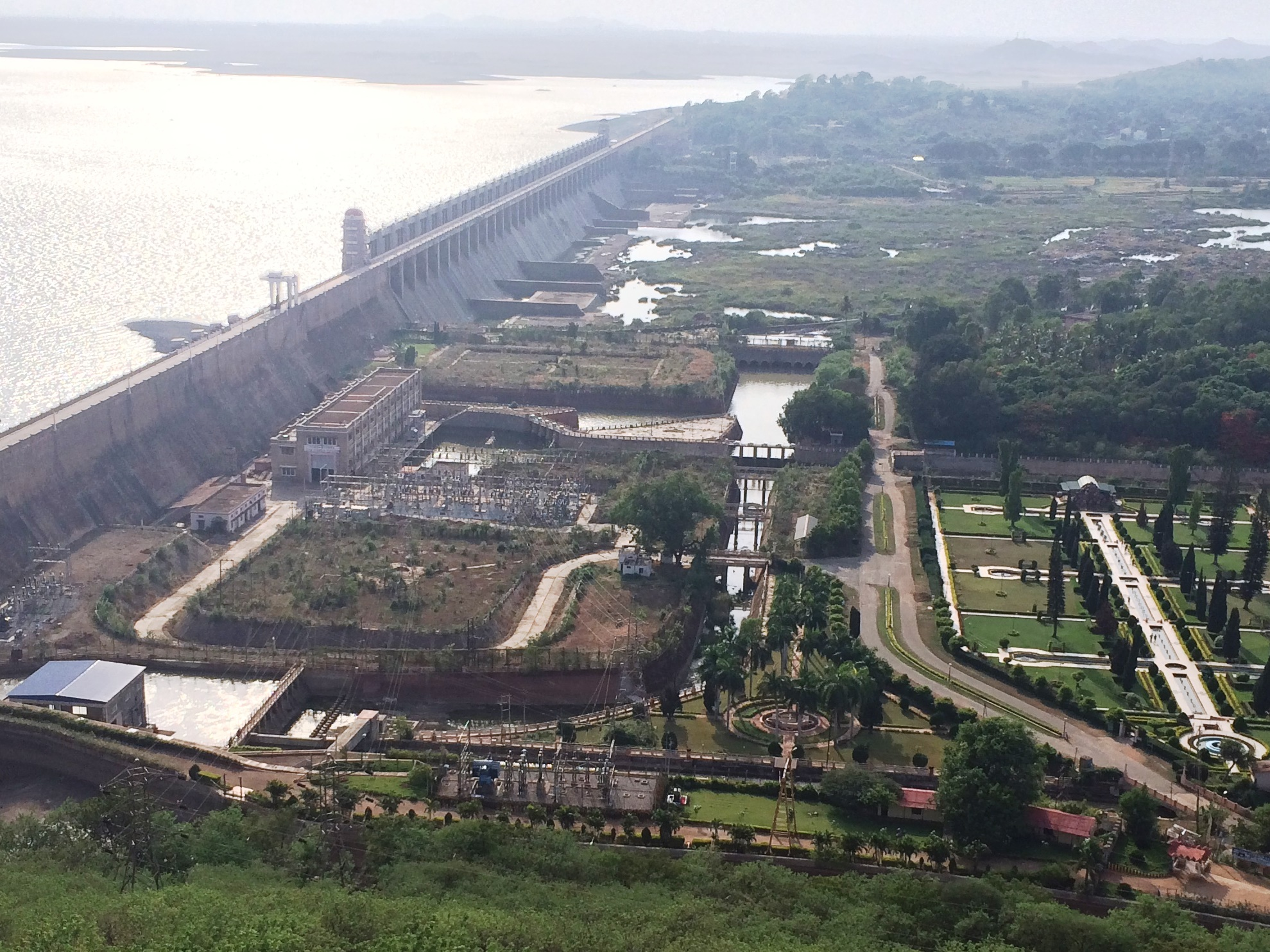
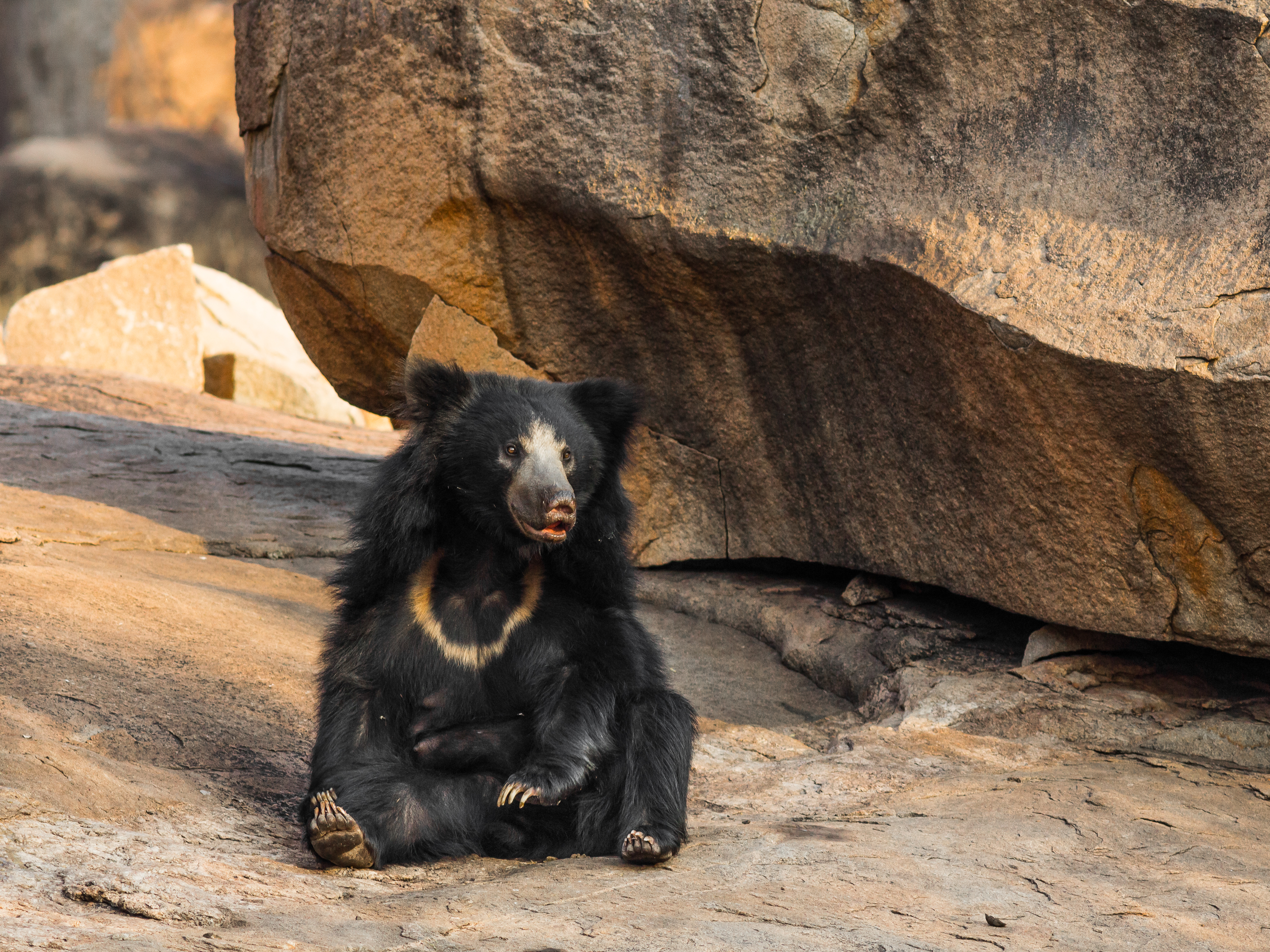
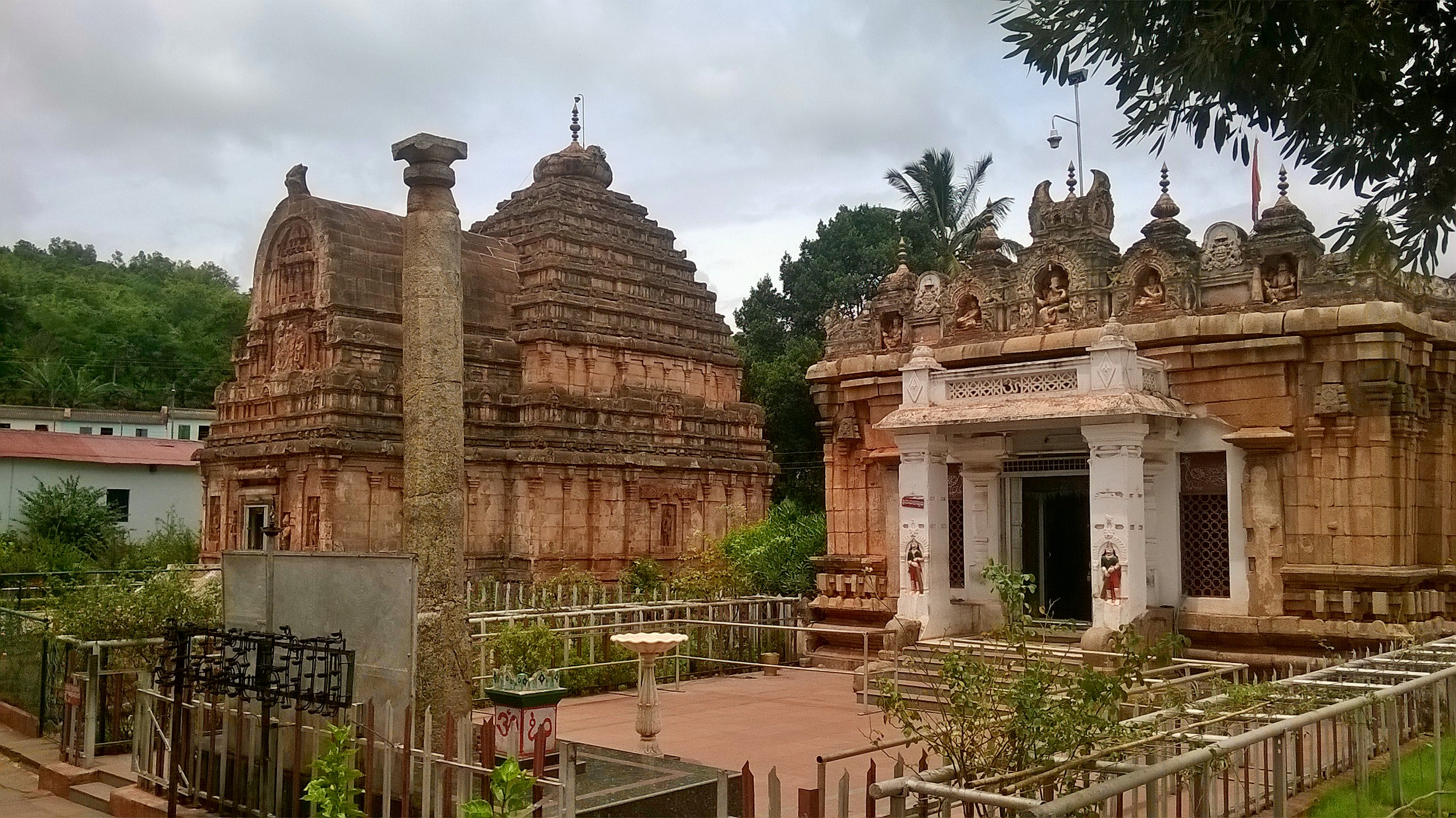
- View of the city from Bellary Fort Tungabhadra Dam Daroji Sloth Bear Sanctuary Kumaraswami Temple
- Interactive map of Ballari district
- Coordinates: 15.1500°N 76.9333°E
- Country: India
- State: Karnataka
- Region: Kalyana-Karnataka
- Headquarters: Ballari
- Talukas: Ballari, Kampli, Sanduru, Siruguppa, Kurugodu

Government
  - Type: District administration
  - Body: Zilla Panchayat
  - District Commissioner & District Magistrate: Nagendra Prasad K. (IAS)
  - CEO: MD Haris Sumair, IAS
  - District in-charge minister: B. Z. Zameer Ahmed Khan

Area
  - Total: 8,461 km^{2} (3,267 sq mi)
- Elevation: 449 m (1,473 ft)

Population
  - Total: 2,452,595
  - Density: 290/km^{2} (750/sq mi)
- Demonym: Ballarian

Language
  - Official: Kannada
- Time zone: UTC+5:30 (IST)
- PIN: 583101
- Telephone code: Bellary:08392
- Vehicle registration: KA 34
- Website: ballari.nic.in/en/

Ballari district, formerly known as Bellary District (Kannada: [bɐɭːaːri]), is a major district in the northeastern part of Karnataka, belonging to the Kalyana-Karnataka region. It was one of the largest districts in Karnataka before the Vijayanagara District split from it in 2021. With historical sites and farmland, Ballari district also has the largest deposits of iron ore in India. Ballari, the district's capital, is known as "Steel City" and "Gani Nadu" (City of Mining) for its prominent mining industry.

== History ==
Ballari district was part of the Madras Presidency and was severely affected by the Great Famine of 1876–78. Following Indian independence and the subsequent reorganization of states along linguistic lines, Ballari became part of Karnataka (initially Mysore State) within the region now known as Kalyana-Karnataka (formerly Hyderabad-Karnataka). In 1882, Anantapur District was formed from splitting the Ballari district, followed by Vijayanagara District in 2021.

=== Demand for a separate district ===
Forest Minister and Ballari in-charge MLA Anand Singh demanded the bifurcation of Ballari district into Vijayanagar and Ballari districts. In November 2020, the cabinet approved the division of the district into Ballari and Vijayanagara district. Officially, the district Vijayanagara announced on 2 October 2021 Ballari district consists of Ballari, Kampli, Sandur, Siruguppa and Kurugodu taluks, while Vijayanagara district consists of Hospet, Harappanahalli, Huvina Hadagali, Kottur, Hagaribommanahalli, and Kudligi. The new district Vijayanagara has 6 taluks, but Bellary District has only 5 taluks. This is questioned by all people of erstwhile Bellary District.

== Geography ==
Ballari district is situated in North eastern Karnataka. The district lies between 15°30' and 15°50' north latitude, and 75°40' and 77°11' east longitude. Its total geographic area is 4,252 km^{2}.

It is bounded by Raichur District to the north; Koppal and Vijayanagara districts to the west; Chitradurga districts to the south; and Anantapur and Kurnool districts of Andhra Pradesh to the east. The region receives an annual rainfall of 639 mm.

== Divisions ==
The district consists of one Lok Sabha constituency (Ballari, reserved for STs) and five Karnataka Legislative Assembly constituencies, which are Kampli (ST), Siruguppa (ST), Ballari (ST), Ballari City, and Sandur (ST). The assembly constituency of Siruguppa is part of the neighbouring Koppalparliamentary constituency.

== Economy ==
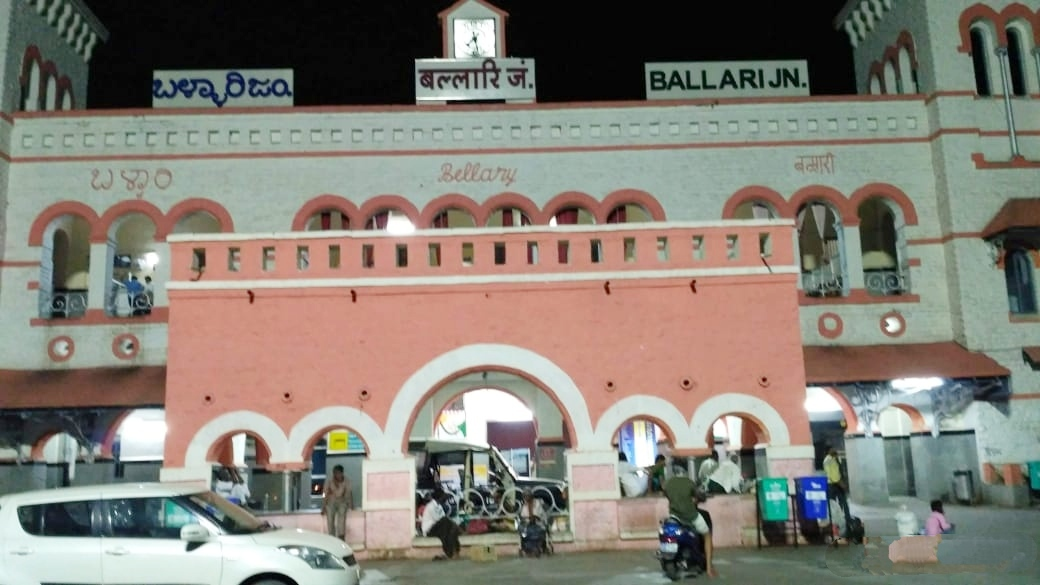
Ballari railway junction

Agriculture is the primary industry in Ballari district, with 75% of its total labour force. Primary crops grown are cotton, jowar, groundnuts, rice, sunflowers, and cereals. The net irrigated area is 37% of the net area sown.

As of 1998, the primary source of irrigation is the Tungabhadra Dam in Vijayanagara District. The canal network accounts for 64% of the district's irrigated area. The major rivers in the district are Tungabhadra, Hagari, and Chikkahagari, but the western taluks of the district have experienced low rainfall over successive years. However, periods of heavy rainfall have periodically caused significant flooding across the district.

== Industries ==
Ballari district possesses extensive natural resources that contribute to its industrial development. This district contains both metallic and non-metallic minerals. Its metallic minerals include iron ore, manganese ore, gold, copper, and lead, while non-metallic minerals include andalusite, asbestos, corundum, clay, dolomite, limestone, limekankan, moulding sand, quartz, soapstone, granite, and red ochre. The metallic minerals are most abundant in Sanduru and Ballari taluks, which lead the district in mining activity. As of 1991, annual production ranged between 2.75 and 4.5 million tonnes for iron ore, and 0.13 million tonnes to 0.30 million tonnes for manganese ore. Industrial expansion in the region has led to a corresponding increase in local property values. The city of Ballari is buuilt around a massive granite monolith, frequently described as one of the world's largest single rock formations.

=== Mining ===
Ballari district has 25% of India's iron ore reserves. Until 1994, mining companies, including the state-owned NMDC, operated there. Later, the government issued mining licences to many private operators, which were based on political nepotism rather than merit. Due to increased demand from China, the mining industry had a surge in iron ore prices.

Flawed mining policy led to widespread illegal mining. Since 2000, money from illegal mining funded the electoral politics of Karnataka State by the Reddy Brothers, who would become King Makers of Karnataka State politics. Ombudsman's report on mining in Karnataka state found that the promoters of privately owned mining companies in the Ballari region paid politicians and then joined politics themselves, rising to positions in the Karnataka state government.

23 units of large and medium scale industries in this district have an investment of Rs.447.76 crore employing around 9,222 persons. At present, it occupies ninth place in the state. Sathavahana Ispat Ltd. is the first Pig Iron plant in the region to utilise the abundant iron ore reserves available, followed by Kirloskar. However, with the commission of Jindal Vijayanagar Steel Limited at Tornagallu, the industry scenario of this district underwent changes. However, the mining industry in Ballari has caused environmental damage and subsequent socioeconomic crises. Some courts in Karnataka have ordered the reclamation of the region.

== Demographics ==
Historical population
Year	Pop.	±% p.a.
1901	512,624	—
1911	507,800	−0.09%
1921	440,660	−1.41%
1931	493,701	+1.14%
1941	544,113	+0.98%
1951	656,079	+1.89%
1961	786,556	+1.83%
1971	976,972	+2.19%
1981	1,305,624	+2.94%
1991	1,656,000	+2.41%
2001	2,027,140	+2.04%
2011	2,452,595	+1.92%

According to the 2011 census, Ballari district has a population of 2,452,595, and is the 168th most populated city in India. The district has a population density of 300 inhabitants per square kilometre (780/sq mi) . Its population growth rate from 2001–2011 was 24.92%. Ballari has a sex ratio of 978 females for every 1000 males and a literacy rate of 67.85%.

The divided district has a population of 1,400,970, of which 607,584 (43.37%) live in urban areas. The divided district has a sex ratio of 984 females per 1000 males. Scheduled Castes and Scheduled Tribes make up 269,096 (19.21%) and 265,990 (18.99%) of the population respectively.

There are 1,174,010 Hindus, 208,014 Muslims, and 10,293 Christians.

Religion in residual Bellary district (2011)
Hinduism	83.80%
Islam	14.85%
Christianity	0.73%
Other or not stated	0.62%

=== Languages ===
Languages of residual Bellary district (2011)
1. Kannada (68.1%)
2. Telugu (13.5%)
3. Urdu (12.7%)
4. Hindi (1.86%)
5. Lambadi (1.29%)
6. Marathi (0.92%)
7. Others (1.69%)

In the 2011 census, 68.09% of the population spoke Kannada, 13.47% Telugu, 12.68% Urdu, 1.86% Hindi, 1.29% Lambadi, and 0.92% Marathi as their first language.

== Tourism ==
In Ballari district, there are historical sites such as Ballari Fort, a nearby village named Bommghatta that hosts the deity Hanuman as Hulikunteraya, Timmalapura, for its temple to Sri Krishna, and Sanduru, known for its historic temple to Kumaraswamy.

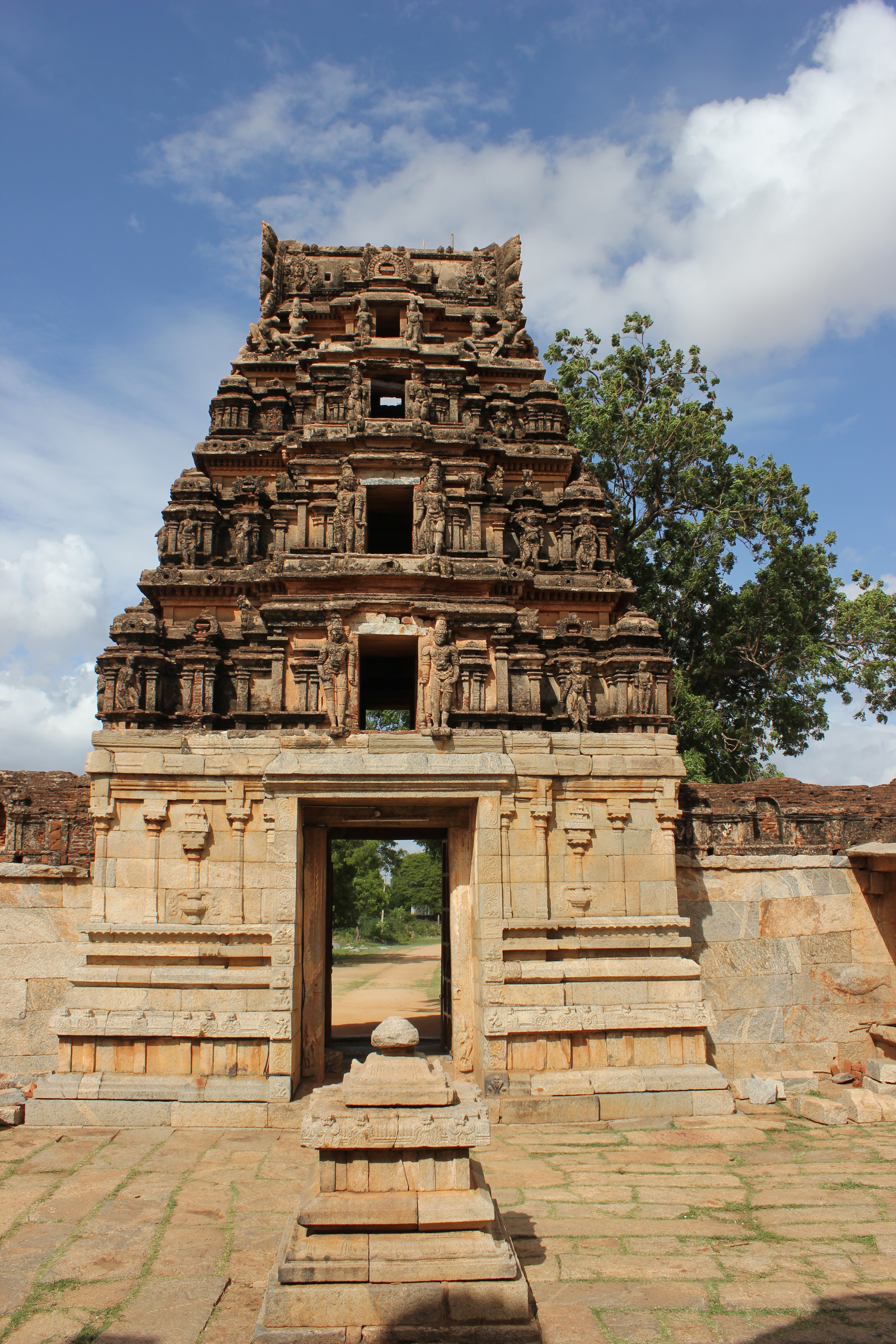
Gopala Krishnaswamy temple

== Politics ==
- E. Tukaram: MP Ballari
- Y. Devendrappa: Former MP
- K. C. Kondaiah: Former MP and MLC
- B Nagendra: Ballari Rural MLA
- G. Janardhana Reddy: mining baron and BJP member. A former minister in the BS Yeddyurappa government, he was sentenced to 3 years in jail for Illegal iron ore mining
- G. Karunakara Reddy: Former Minister and MLA (Harpanahalli)
- G. Somashekara Reddy: MLA, Ballari City
- B. Sriramulu: BJP vice-president of Karnataka and current Health minister
- Allum Veerabhadrappa: MLC and Former KPCC President

== See also ==
- Chilagodu
- Narsapur, Karnataka
- Sridhargadda
