= Advimallanakeri =

Advimallanakeri & Adavimallanakeri Thanda
- Village
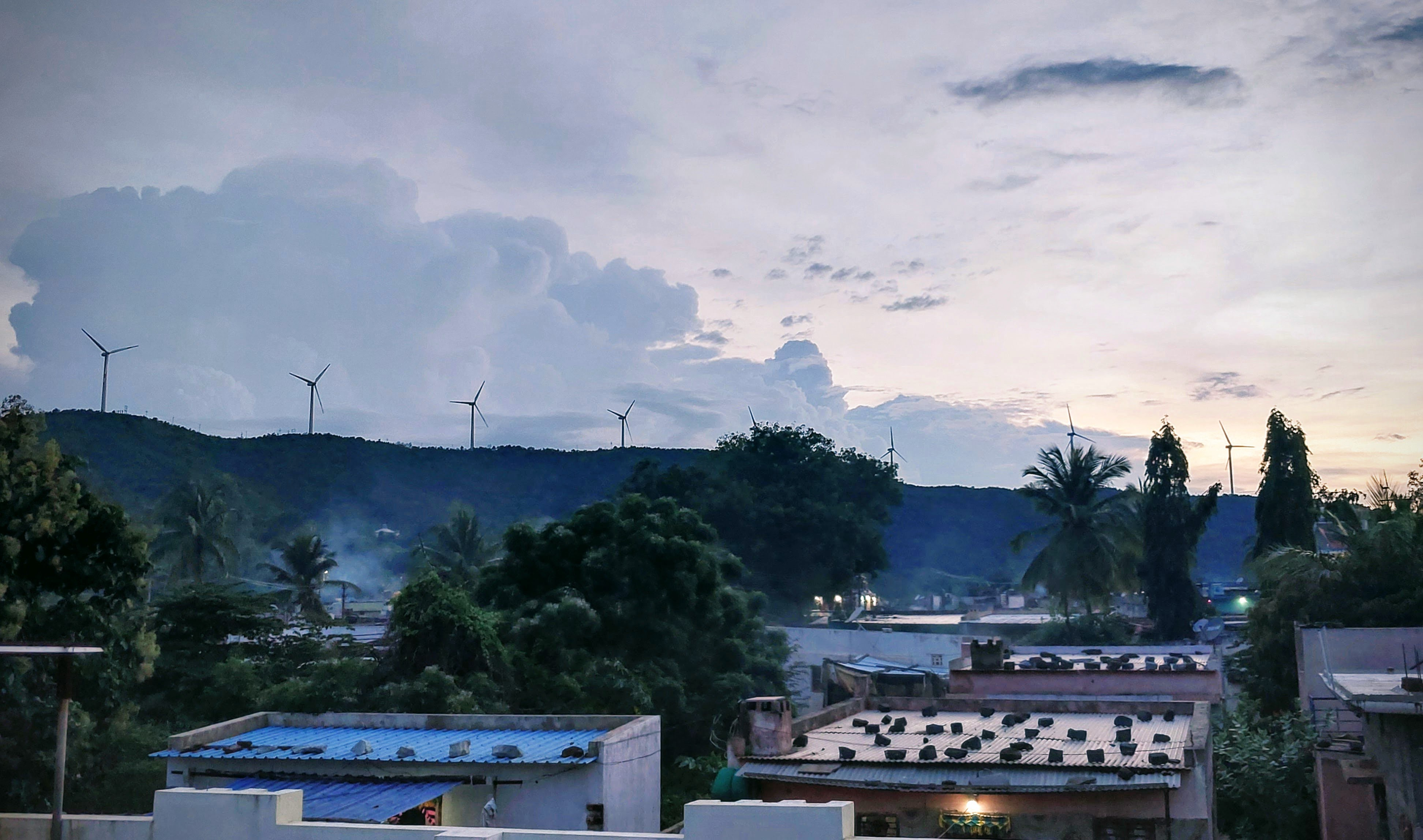
- Adavimallanakeri Thanda view on evening

- Location in Karnataka, India Advimallanakeri & Adavimallanakeri Thanda (India)
- Coordinates: 14.913490°N 76.000734°E
- Country: India
- State: Karnataka
- District: Vijayanagara
- Talukas: Hoovina Hadagalli

Government
  - Body: Village Panchayat

Languages
  - Official: Kannada and Lambani
- Time zone: UTC+5:30 (IST)
- Postal code: 583219
- ISO 3166 code: IN-KA
- Vehicle registration: KA 35
- Nearest city: Hoovina Hadagali
- Civic agency: Village Panchayat
- Website: karnataka.gov.in

Advimallanakeri & Adavimallanakeri Thanda are the neighborhood villages in the southern state of Karnataka, India. these are located in the Hadagalli taluk of Vijayanagara District in Karnataka.

Initially, the Banjara people who lived on Adavimallanakeri, with the intention of building their own village, settled in the forest 1 km away in the western direction, built a village there, and named it as Adavimallanakeri Thanda. Thanda means village in Lambani language.

== Transport ==
Generally people mostly use Government buses to travel here. Its schedule is as follows;

KKRTC BUS SCHEDULE
Sl. No.	Arrival and Departure time (approx)	Arrives from	Departs to
1	6.30 am	Nandihalli	Kottur
2	7.00 am	Uttangi	Davanagere
3	7.00 am	Ittigi	Hadagali
4	7.30 am	Hadagali	Harapanahalli
5	8.00 am	Holagundi	Davangere
6	9.00 am	Hadagali	Ittigi
7	10.30 am	Ittigi	Hadagali
8	3.00 pm	Hadagali	Ittigi
9	5.30 pm	Ittigi	Hadagali
10	6.00 pm	Davanagere	Holagundi
11	8.30 pm	Harapanahalli	Uttangi
12	10.00 pm	Kottur	Nandihalli

Note:

- The above schedule is as per January 2025.
- Approximate time added, because of there is no proper maintenance of time often, sometimes gets delay and sometimes early.
- So there is one suggestion to travellers, reach the Bus stop 10–15 minutes earlier.

=== Nearby other transports ===
Nearby Railway Stations:

- Harihar Railway Station (HRR), located in 57 km away
- Hospet Railway Station (HPT), located in 70 km away

Nearby Airport:

- Jindal Vijayanagar Airport, located in 103 km away

== See also ==
- Vijayanagara
- Districts of Karnataka
