= State Highway 25 (Karnataka) =

Road in Karnataka, India

State Highway 25

Route information
- Maintained by Karnataka Road Development Corporation Limited
- Length: 194.46 km (120.83 mi)

Major junctions
- North end: Hosapete
- South end: Shivamogga

Location
- Country: India
- State: Karnataka
- Districts: Vijayanagara, Davanagere, Shivamogga
- Primary destinations: Harapanahalli, Harihar, Honnali

Highway system
- Roads in India; Expressways; National; State; Asian; State Highways in Karnataka

State Highway 25 also known as Hosapete-Shivamogga Road or SH-25, is a state highway connecting Hosapete of Vijayanagar district and Shivamogga City in Shivamogga district, in the South Indian state of Karnataka. It has a total length of 194.46 kilometres (120.83 mi).

Major towns and villages on SH-25 are: Hosapete, Mariyammanahalli, Varadapura, Varabbihala, Uppanayakanahalli, Pinjara Heggadala, Kadlebala, Hagaribommanahalli, Uluvatthi, Nelakudure, Ittigi, Nandibewooru, Kanavihalli, Bagali, Shrungarathota, Harapanahalli, Mellekatte, Ananthanahalli, Chirasthahalli, Teligi, Gutthuru, Harihara, Byaladahalli, Nandi Thavare, Malebennur, Gollarahalli, Devanayakanahalli, Didagooru, Govinakovi, Dodderi, Akka Tangiyara Katte, Thavarekoppagondanahalli, Holalur, Bullapura, Goravikatte, Holehanasawadi, Gondi Chitnahalli and Shivamogga.
