= Latha Mallikarjun =

Indian politician

Member of the Karnataka Legislative Assembly
- Incumbent
- Assumed office 2023
- Chief Minister: Siddaramaiah
- Preceded by: G. Karunakara Reddy
- Constituency: Harapanahalli

Personal details
- Born: 1966 (58 years) Harapanahalli, Vijayanagara district (then Davangere district), Karnataka, India
- Party: Independent
- Parents: M. P. Prakash (Former Deputy Chief Minister of Karnataka)
- Relatives: M.P. Ravindra (Brother)
- Education: G.B.R. PU College, Hoovina Hadagali (PUC)
- Occupation: Politician
- Profession: Agriculture; Social service

Latha Mallikarjun (born 1966) is an Indian politician from Karnataka. She is a member of the 2023 Karnataka Legislative Assembly representing Harapanahalli assembly constituency in Vijayanagara district. She won on an independent in the 2023 Karnataka Legislative Assembly election but later joined the Indian National Congress.

== Early life and education ==
Mallikarjun is from Harapanahalli, Vijayanagara district, Karnataka. She married HM Mallikarjun, a retired government employee. She is the daughter of veteran Janata parivar and Congress leader and former deputy chief minister late MP Prakash. She studied Class 12 at GBR College, Hoovina Hadagali and passed the examinations in 1984.

== Career ==
Latha Mallikarjun won from Harapanahalli Assembly constituency as an independent, defeating G. Karunakara Reddy of the Bharatiya Janata Party. She polled 70,194 votes and won by a margin of 13,845 votes. After the death of her father, her brother and three sisters also joined politics. Her brother MP Ravindra, who joined Congress also died in 2018. While her two sisters MP Latha and MP Veena are with Congress, her other sister MP Suma joined BJP.

She contested as an independent after she was denied a Congress ticket in 2023. But after winning the seat, she pledged her support to the newly elected Congress government.
