= G. Karunakara Reddy =

Indian politician (born 1962)

Gaali Karunakara Reddy

Minister of Revenue Department of Karnataka
- In office 7 June 2008 – 4 August 2011

Member of Karnataka Legislative Assembly
- In office 2018–2023
- Preceded by: M.P. Ravindra
- Succeeded by: Latha Mallikarjun
- Constituency: Harapanahalli
- In office 2008–2013
- Preceded by: P. T. Parameshwar Naik
- Succeeded by: M.P. Ravindra
- Constituency: Harapanahalli

Member of Parliament Lok Sabha
- In office 2004–2008
- Preceded by: Kolur Basavanagoud
- Succeeded by: J. Shantha
- Constituency: Bellary

Personal details
- Born: 10 April 1962 (age 64) Bellary, Karnataka, India
- Citizenship: India
- Party: Bharatiya Janata Party
- Spouse: G. Vanaja
- Parent(s): G. Chenga Reddy and G. Rukmanamma
- Education: Veerashaiva College
- Occupation: Social Worker, Businessperson

G. Karunakara Reddy (born 10 April 1962) is an Indian politician from the state of Karnataka, who is the member of the Karnataka Legislative Assembly from Harapanahalli assembly constituency. He was made Revenue Minister in B.S Yeddyurappa Cabinet. He was previously a member of the 14th Lok Sabha from the Bellary constituency as a member of the Bharatiya Janata Party.

== Karnataka Politics ==
In the 2008 assembly elections, he contested against Congress leader and former deputy chief minister of Karnataka M.P. Prakash from Harpanahalli constituency in Davanagere District and won by a margin of over 25218 votes. He and his younger brother G. Janardhana Reddy, a MLC from Bellary, were subsequently made ministers in the BJP government led by B. S. Yeddyurappa, when the latter needed the support of a section of MLAs loyal to the Reddy brothers.

After D. V. Sadananda Gowda of the BJP took over as CM from Yeddyurappa following the Lokayukta report on illegal mining in 2011, subsequently, Yeddyurappa broke away from the BJP to form the Karnataka Janata Paksha (KJP) and later rejoined BJP in 2014.
