= Magala =

Magala Magala maangola, mangala, mavina kola etc.
- village
- Location in Karnataka, India Magala (India)
- Coordinates: 15.02°N 75.95°E
- Country: India
- State: Karnataka
- District: Vijayanagara district
- Talukas: Hadagali

Government
  - Body: Gram panchayat

Population (2001)
  - Total: 5,172

Languages
  - Official: Kannada
- Time zone: UTC+5:30 (IST)
- ISO 3166 code: IN-KA
- Vehicle registration: KA
- Website: karnataka.gov.in

Magala is a village in the southern state of Karnataka, India. It is located in the Hadagali taluk of Bellary district in Karnataka.

== See also ==
- Bellary
- Districts of Karnataka
