= Solladahalli =

- village
- Location in Karnataka, India Solladahalli (India)
- Coordinates: 14.91°N 76.40°E
- Country: India
- State: Karnataka
- District: Vijayanagara district
- Talukas: Kudligi

Government
  - Body: Gram panchayat

Population (2001)
  - Total: 5,552

Languages
  - Official: Kannada
- Time zone: UTC+5:30 (IST)
- ISO 3166 code: IN-KA
- Vehicle registration: KA
- Website: karnataka.gov.in

Solladahalli is a village in the southern state of Karnataka, India. It is located in the Kudligi taluk of Bellary district in Karnataka.

== Demographics ==
As of 2001 India census, Solladahalli had a population of 5552 with 2870 males and 2682 females.

== See also ==
- Bellary
- Districts of Karnataka
