= Hudem =

- Village
- Location in Karnataka, India Hudem (India)
- Coordinates: 14.91°N 76.40°E
- Country: India
- State: Karnataka
- District: Vijayanagara
- Talukas: Kudligi

Government
  - Body: Gram panchayat

Population (2001)
  - Total: 6,480

Languages
  - Official: Kannada
- Time zone: UTC+5:30 (IST)
- ISO 3166 code: IN-KA
- Vehicle registration: KA
- Website: karnataka.gov.in

Hudem is a village in the southern state of Karnataka, India. It is located in the Kudligi taluk of Bellary district in Karnataka.

== Demographics ==
As of 2001 India census, Hudem had a population of 6480 with 3339 males and 3141 females.

== See also ==
- Bellary
- Districts of Karnataka
