= Moregeri =

- village
- Location in Karnataka, India Moregeri (India)
- Coordinates: 15.04°N 76.20°E
- Country: India
- State: Karnataka
- District: Vijayanagara district
- Talukas: Hagaribommanahalli

Government
  - Body: Gram panchayat

Population (2001)
  - Total: 5,146

Languages
  - Official: Kannada
- Time zone: UTC+5:30 (IST)
- ISO 3166 code: IN-KA
- Vehicle registration: KA
- Website: karnataka.gov.in

Moregeri is a village in the southern state of Karnataka, India. It is located in the Hagaribommanahalli taluk of Vijayanagara district in Karnataka, Vijayanagara District.

== History ==
Morigeri has a history of nearly 2000 years and it is rules by rastrakutas and Vijayanagara Kingdom, it is mainly ruled by Nayakas Morigeri. It shares its boundary with other villages called sonna gaddikeri ittigi sakri Halla holagundi and uttangi. Morigeri is a heterogeneous village, here you find 5 atmalinga's which are called as Shiva lingas and there were nearly 32 temples situated.

Annually people celebrate five fairs in village

- kalleswara temple jatra
- Maradi duragamma Devi jatraa
- muli kalleswara jatra
- gavisiddeswara jatraa
- boomika devi jaatra

and other festivals as well.

Also the village had one of the bramha Deva temples, according to some notes it is the third bramha temple in Karnataka.

== Demographics ==
As of 2001 India census, Moregeri had a population of 5146 with 2593 males and 2553 females.

== See also ==
- Bellary
- Districts of Karnataka
