= Towdur =

- Village
- Country: India
- State: Karnataka
- District: Vijayanagara district
- Talukas: Harapanahalli

Population (2001)
  - Total: 5,414

Languages
  - Official: Kannada
- Time zone: UTC+5:30 (IST)

Towdur is a village in the southern state of Karnataka, India. It can also be spelt as Thoudur, Tavadur or Thouduru. It is located in the Harapanahalli taluk of Bellary district in Karnataka. It is a Grama Panchayat, consisting of 11 villages. The village has mostly farmers, a few middle-class families, and very few rich people. The village consists of 7 main historical temples. Udisalambika Devi Temple and Veeranjaneya temples are the famous among them. Basavanna Temple is like an assembly for the villagers. Villagers assemble here for Important discussions in the name of Panchayat meet. Thoudur owns 1 Government Higher Primary School and Government High school named Ayyanahalli Matada Kadamma Veerayya High School land donated by AM Ajjaiah & Kotraiah brothers on remembrance of his Parents. (A M Kadamma & Veeraiah)

Udisalambika Devi Jathra/festival will be held every once in 5year next is on 7 March 2017 which is famous and Anjaneya swamy car festival is once in a year usually after 9days of Ugadi festival it happens.

Demographics

As of 2001 India census, Towdur had a population of 5414 with 2814 males and 2600 females.

== See also ==
- Bellary
- Districts of Karnataka
