= Kottige =

- village
- Country: India
- State: Karnataka

Languages
  - Official: Kannada
- Time zone: UTC+5:30 (IST)

Kottige (also known as Megala Kottige) is a small village in the Holalkere town of Chitradurga State in Karnataka, India.

== Regional ==
The total population of Kottige is less than 100. The village is bordered by Kabbala, Kelagina Kottige, Ugane Katte and Vaddara Hatti.

== Tourism ==
The village is known for Huli Katte, a water pool named for its historical association with tigers (huli in Kannada). The surrounding Deccan Karnataka landscape features hills and agricultural areas frequented by local wildlife, including hyenas, sloth bears, and wild boars during the evening and night hours.

Visitors also flock the age old, Maari Gudi (Maari Shrine), which hosts Goddess Maari (of Maari Kanive) and attain the blessings of the Devi. During the village festival (Jaatre) held once in 12 years, Swaamana Kunita (Dance of 'Swama') provide a mindblowing perspective into the traditions and culture of ancient Dravidian Karnataka.

There is no bus route available into the village and the tourists have to get down at Ugane Katte Bus Stop or NG Halli Bus Stop between Hosadurga - Holalkere road and walk 4 miles through a dense irrigated area and coconut farms to reach the village.
