= Neelagunda, Harapanahalli =

Neelagunda
- Village
- Location within Karnataka Location within India
- Coordinates: 14°44′5″N 75°53′45″E
- Country: India
- State: Karnataka
- District: Vijayanagara district
- Taluk: Harapanahalli
- Lok Sabha Constituency: Harapanahalli

Population (2011)
  - Total: 3,059

Languages
  - Official: Kannada
- Time zone: UTC+5:30 (IST)
- Vehicle registration: KA-35

Neelagunda is a historical village 12 km away from Harapanahalli city, and in the Harapanahalli Taluk of Vijayanagara district in Karnataka state, India.

== Importance ==
Neelagunda is famous for the Bheemeshwara Temple of the Western Chalukya era.

== See also ==
- Harihara
- Harapanahalli
- Vijayanagara
- Karnataka
