= Teligi =

Teligi may refer to:

- Teligi (village), a village in Karnataka, India
- Teligi, Russia, a rural locality (a selo) in Megino-Kangalassky District of the Sakha Republic, Russia
