= Chutu dynasty =

Indian dynasty (1st century BCE–3rd century CE)

- 1st century BCE–3rd century CE
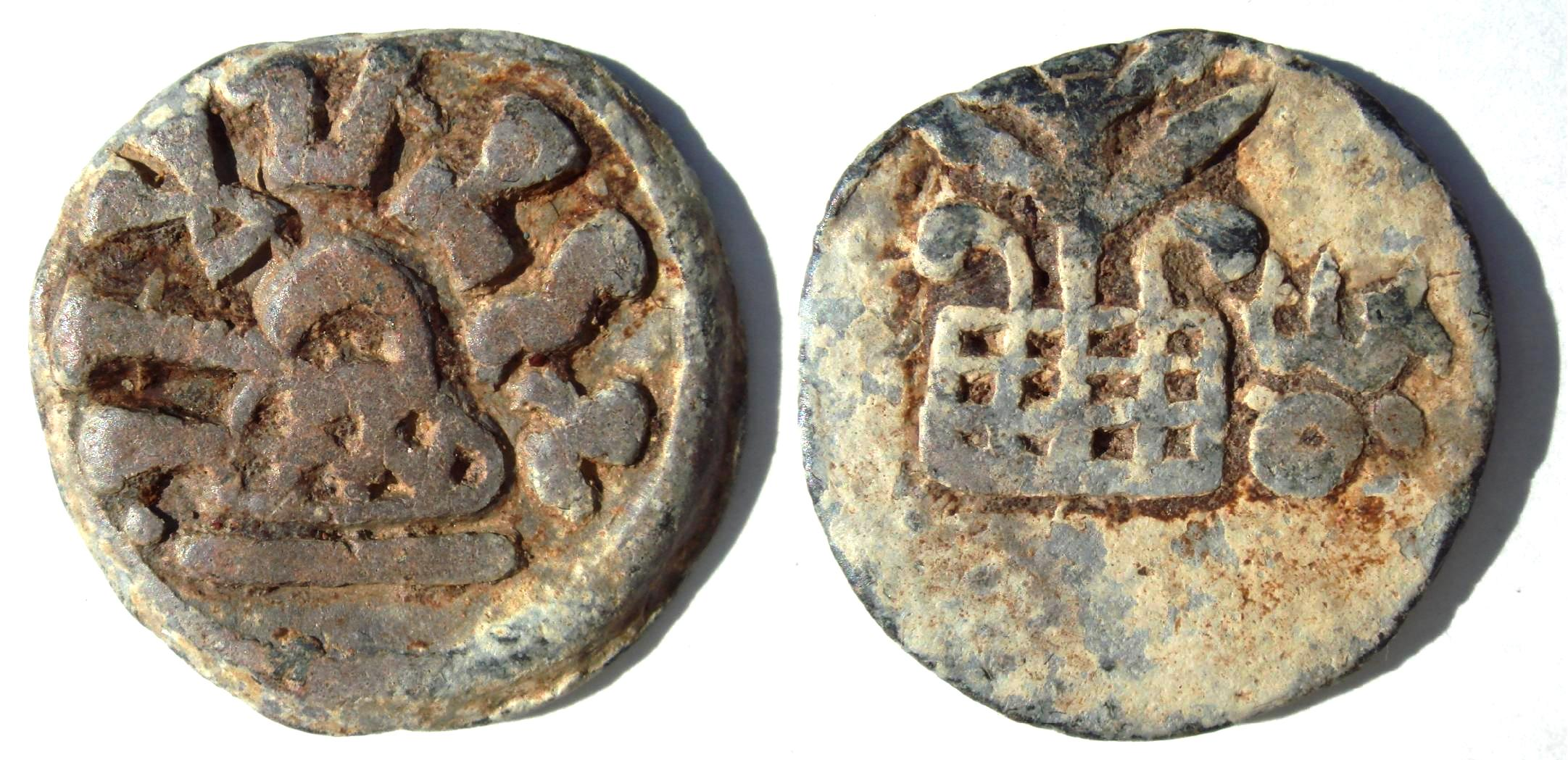
- Coin of the Chutu ruler Mulananda c. 125-345. Lead Karshapana 14.30g. 27 mm. Obv.: Arched hill/stupa with river motif below. Rev.: Tree within railed lattice, triratana to right.

- Location of the Chutus in South India, and neighbouring South Asian polities circa 120 CE.
- Capital: Banavasi
- Common languages: Prakrit; Kannada
- Religion: Buddhism; Jainism
- Government: Monarchy
- History
  - Established: 1st century BCE
  - Disestablished: 3rd century CE
| Preceded by | Succeeded by |
| Satavahana dynasty | Kadamba dynasty |
- Today part of: India

The Chutu dynasty (IAST: Cuṭu) ruled parts of the Deccan region of South India between the first and third centuries CE, with their capital at Banavasi in present-day Karnataka state. The Chutus probably rose to power as feudatories of the Satavahanas, and assumed sovereignty after the decline of Satavahana power. Except for the edicts of Asoka, the inscriptions of the Chutu dynasty are the oldest documents found in the northern part of present-day Karnataka.

== Name ==
The name "Chutu-kula" ("Chutu family") is found in the contemporary inscriptions. The coins attributed to the family bear the legends Raño Cuṭukaḷānaṃdasa ("of king Chutukalananda"), Raño Muḷānaṃdasa, and Raño Sivaḷānaṃdasa. The word "Cuṭukaḷānaṃdasa" was misread as "Cuṭukaḍānaṃdasa" by some earlier scholars, leading to different theories about the names of the kings and their dynasty. For example, numismatist E. J. Rapson (1908) theorized "Chutu-kada-nanda" meant "Joy of the City of the Chutus". Chutu inscriptions contain the emblem of the cobra hood implying Chutu meant the "cobra crest". This connects the Chutus to the Naga tribes as they also associated themselves with the region of the western Deccan called Nagara Khanda around modern Banavasi.

According to numismatist Michael Mitchiner (1983), these names appear to be matronymics. For example, Raño Muḷānaṃdasa means "of king Mulananda", where "Mulananda" is a matronymic meaning "son (nanda) of a queen belonging to the Mula gotra". Similarly, Sivaḷānaṃdasa means "of the son of a queen belonging to the Sivala gotra". Mitchiner theorizes "Chutu-kula-nanda-sa" ("son of a queen belonging to the Chutu family") was a common name borne by multiple kings of the dynasty. This theory is based on the fact that the Banavasi inscription of king Haritiputra Vishnukada Chutukulananda Satakarni was issued shortly before the Kadamba occupation of Banavasi c. 345, while the coins bearing the name Chutukulananda can be dated to two centuries earlier based on the stratification at Chandravalli excavations. Historian M. Rama Rao used the term "Ananda family" to describe the family, because the coin legends mention kings whose names end in "-nanda". Numismatists P. L. Gupta and A. V. Narasimha Murthy also followed this interpretation.

== Origins ==
At least two of the Chutu kings bore the title of "Satakarni", which is associated with the more notable Satavahana dynasty, and which was also borne by ministers and ordinary people in the Satavahana period. The exact relationship between the Chutus and the Satavahanas is uncertain. Modern historians variously believe the Chutu family originated as a branch of the Satavahanas, was descended from the Satavahana princesses, or simply succeeded the Satavahanas in the southern Deccan.

Numismatist Michael Mitchiner speculates the Chutus may have been of Indo-Scythian (Shaka) origin. According to him, some Chutu coins bear designs copied from Indo-Scythian coins. For example, the obverse of two lead coins found at Kondapur features a swastika surrounded by a legend "reminds one of the Kshaharata coins stuck for Ladhanes and Pisayu". The reverse of the same coin bears an arrow and a thunderbolt that seems to be derived from the coins of Bhumaka and Nahapana. According to V. V. Mirashi's interpretation, the issuers of such coins variously call themselves Shakas or members of the Chutu family. Mirashi and Mitchiner read the legend on the coin as Mahasenapatisa Baradajaputasa Saga Mana Chutukulasa, which means "of the Maha-senapati (chief commander) Saka Mana, the son of Baradaja, of the Chutu family". Mitchiner notes that according to a Nashik inscription, the Satavahana king Gautamiputra Satakarni issued an order from his "camp of victory" at Vaijayanti (the ancient name of Banavasi). He theorizes the Chutus were originally Indo-Scythian chiefs, who became Satavahana feudatories when Gautamiputra defeated the Indo-Scythian king Nahapana around 125 CE. Subsequently, they participated in Satavahana military campaigns: one Chutu chief was appointed as the Mahasenapati in the Kondapur region, while another was appointed to govern the newly-captured city of Banavasi.

Historian D. C. Sircar has disputed Mirashi's reading of the coin legend, arguing the expression Saga Mana Chutukulasa cannot be interpreted as "Saka Mana of the Chutu family". Sircar argues if this was the meaning intended, the expression would have been Chutu-kulasa Saga-Manasa or Chutu-kula-Saga-Manasa. Sircar instead reads the term Saga-Mana as Sagamana ("of the Sagamas, that is, belonging to the Sagama family"). The Chutu coins discovered from Anantapur district in Andhra Pradesh and the southern part of Telangana prove the Chutus held sway in and around the Srisailam (Kurnool district, Andhra Pradesh) or Sriparvata area which explained their title of Sriparvatiyas (the masters of the Sriparvata region). In medieval times, the Srisailam region or the Sriparvata area was known as Kannadu and Kannavisaya which is the contracted form of Satakarninadu and Satakarnivisaya. Satakarninadu and Satakarnivisaya seem to be identical with the Satavahanihara of the Myakadoni inscription of Pulumayi, or the Satavahaniratta of the Hirehadagalli grant. The Chutus continued to use the title Satakanni along with their names and regions, but later dropped the Sata part of Satakanni and used only the title of Kanni.

== Political history ==
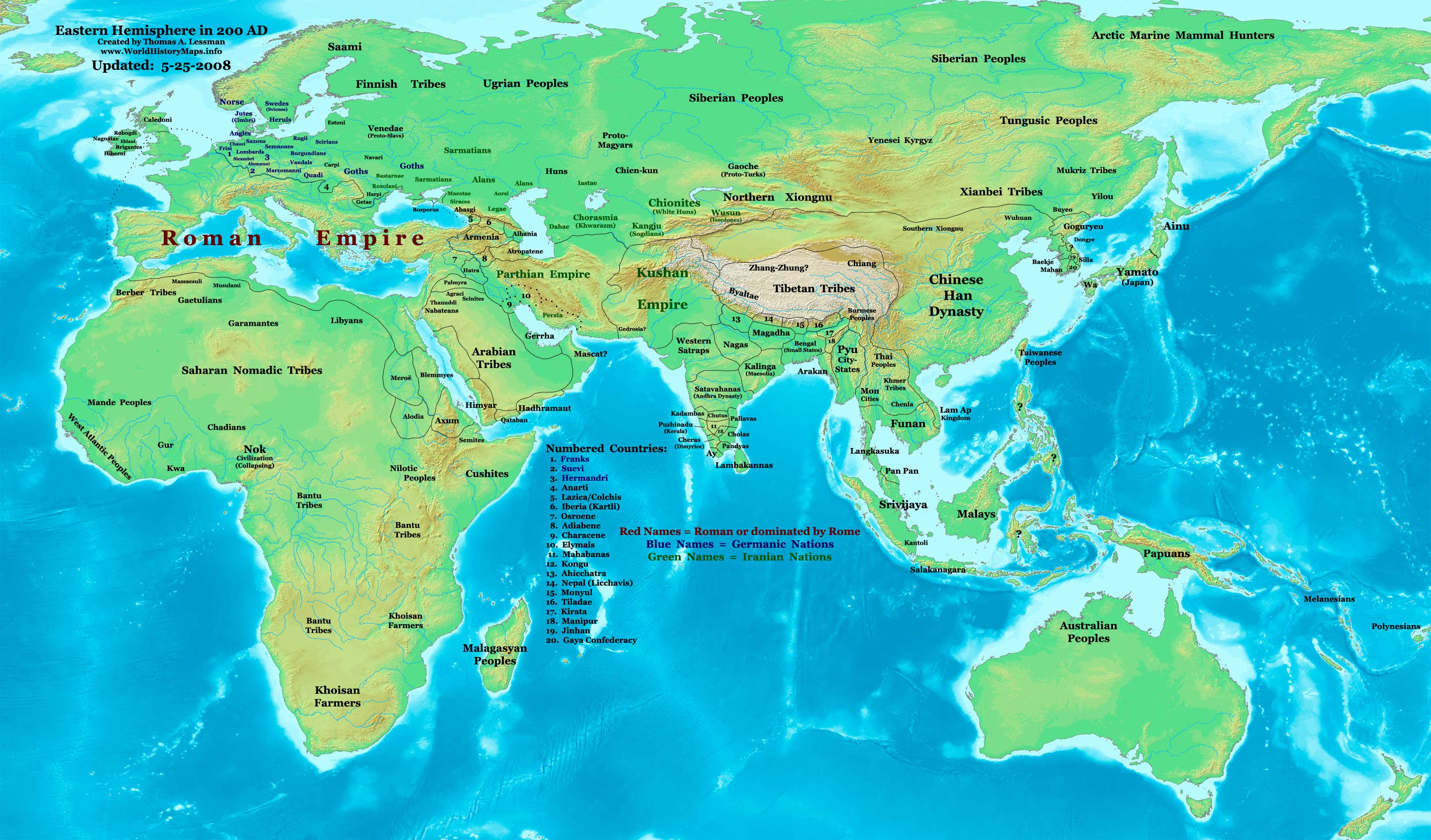
The Eastern Hemisphere c. 2nd century AD.

The Chutus ruled a kingdom centered around the city of Banavasi in present-day Karnataka for over two centuries, from c. 125 CE to c. 345 CE. The Chutus were probably subordinate to the Satavahanas in the beginning, and assumed independence when Satavahana power declined. They were probably one of the several dynasties described collectively as "Andhra-bhritya" ("servants of the Andhras, that is, the Satavahanas) in the Puranas. Numismatic evidence suggests the Chutus were surrounded by other Satavahana feudatories: the Kuras of Kolhapur in the north and the Sadakana Maharathis of Chandravalli. The coins issued by these three families are similar, and most of these coins can be dated to the 2nd century CE. Coins discovered at Chandravalli and Kondapur bear the legend of "Maharathi Sadakana Chutu Krishna", which suggests the Chutus consolidated their power by intermarriage with the other feudatory families.

Numismatic evidence also indicates that by the last quarter of the 2nd century CE, the power of these three feudatory families was eclipsed by the Satavahanas, who appear to have assumed greater control over their territories. This is suggested by the discovery of the coins of the Satavahana ruler Yajna Sri Satakarni at Bramhapuri (Kolhapur) and Chandravalli: the Satavahana coins were found in a more recent strata compared to the coins of the feudatory dynasties. When Satavahana power declined in the first half of the 3rd century CE, the Chutus retained their authority at Banavasi, unlike the Kuras and the Sadakana Maharathis. Their rule is attested by at least four inscriptions dated between the 260s and 340s CE. Historian Sailendra Nath Sen states that after the fall of the Satavahanas post the end of the reign of Pulumayi IV in 225 CE, the Chutus appear to have controlled the far-flung areas of the south-western parts of the erstwhile Satavahana empire. They subsequently extended their power in the north and the east. According to historian Teotónio R. De Souza, following the rule of Shak Satakarni of the Satavahanas, the Chutus ruling from Banavasi, probably also gained control of the Konkan and places in Goa like Kunkalli, Balli, and Kankon, as subordinates of the Bhojas.

Che hutu dynasty came to an end probably in the first or second half of the third century, that is, around 250–275 CE. Two kings of the Chutu dynasty tre known through inscriptions, Hariti-putra Chutu-kadananda Satakarni and his grandson Hariti-putra Siva-skanda-varman, who ruled in Banavasi before its conquest by the Kadamba dynasty. In 222 CE, Prithivi-sena, son of Rudra-sena I, was reigning as the Western Kshatrapa ruler, in succession to the latter - Hariti-putra Siva-skanda-varman. The Chutus appear to have continued the policy of consolidating their power by intermarriage with their neighbours: this is suggested by an Ikshvaku dynasty record which states the "Maharaja of Vanavasa" (presumably the Chutu ruler of Banavasi) married a daughter of the Ikshvaku king Vira-purusha-datta. Mitchiner also believes the occurrence of the name "Satakarni" in the names of the Chutu kings (Vishnurudra Sivalananda Satakarni and Haritiputra Vishnukada Chutukulananda Satakarni) suggests the Chutus also married into the Satavahana family. The Chutu king Sivalananda is attested by a 278 CE inscription of the Abhira ruler Vasushena from Nagarjunakonda.

== Religion ==
According to Mitchiner, the designs on the Chutu coins suggest they may have been Buddhists, although they also patronised Hinduism. According to an inscription in the town of Malavalli in southern Karnataka, one of their rulers, King Haritiputra Satakarni donated the village of Belgame to a group of Hindu priests. Belgame, not to be confused with its namesake in northwestern Karnataka, was located in the Shimoga district in Central Karnataka and is known as Balligavi today. The priests built five mathas, three puras and seven gurukulas there and developed Belgame as an important centre of learning and knowledge. The original grant was revived by another Chutu ruler, King Haritiputra Shiva-skandavarman and the sacred town was later expanded by the succeeding Kadamba rulers.

== Successors ==
The Chalukya dynasty of Badami, which later controlled much of present-day Karnataka, claimed descent from a son of Hariti (a woman of the Harita gotra) and of Manavya gotra. The Chalukyas had appropriated this genealogy from the Kadamba dynasty, who ruled Banavasi before them and after the Chutus. The Kadambas, in turn, had appropriated this genealogy from the Chutus. Historian Sailendra Nath Sen theorizes the Chalukyas were related to the Chutus and the Kadambas "in some way".

== Inscriptions ==
=== Banavasi inscription ===
The stone inscription at Banavasi (Vanavasi or Vaijayanti in Uttara Kannada district, Karnataka) mentions Haritiputra Visnukada Chutukulananda Satakarni, who in the 12th year of his reign made a gift of a Nagashilpa, a tank and a Vihara. The nearby Malavalli inscription refers the same king Manavyasa Gotra Haritiputra Visnukadda Chutukulananda Satakarni, the king of Banavasi, who in the 1st year of his reign made the grant of a village. A stone inscription on the same pillar by a Kadamba king of the 5th century mentions a prior chieftain, Manavyasa Gotra Haritiputra Vaijayantipati Sivaskandavarman who also ruled this area. Based on this inscription and Rapson's opinion on Kanheri and this inscriptions, historian Gabriel Jouveau-Dubreuil states the Chutus succeeded the Satavahanas in both the Karnataka and the Aparanta (Konkan and western Maharashtra) regions. However, Sudhakar Chattopadhyaya states the succession occurred at a later date, when the Chutus had gained control over the northern part of the Kannada and Malayalam speaking regions.

Haritiputra-Satakarni issued an order to the chief revenue commissioner Mahavallabha-Rajjuka to grant the village of Sahalavati to a certain Kondamana as a Brahmin endowment in 175 CE for the enjoyment of the Mattapatti (Malavalli) god with the exemption of the soldier's entry (abhatappavesam). Another record states king Satakami had a daughter named Mahabhoja-Nagasri who made a grant of a tank and a Vihara to the Madhukeswara temple.

== Coinage ==
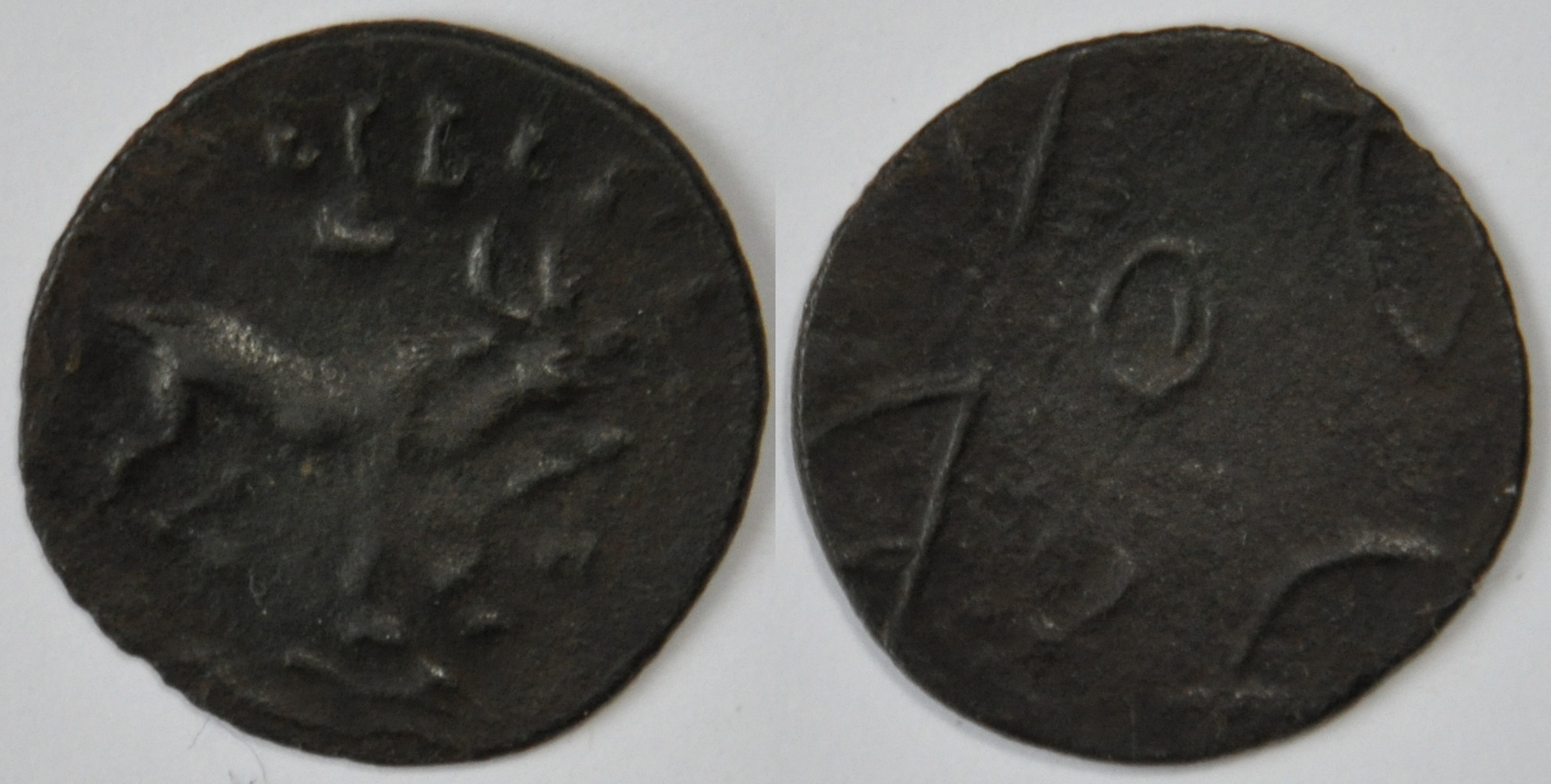
A coin of the post-Chutu period (250–400) in bronze. (Deccan, Central India) A / Cow on the right; Below undulating line, above legend Rajavipurudapa R / 4 arches with arrows and center circle Dimension: 17 mm Weight: 1.21 g. Bronze

Chutu coins have been discovered at Karwar and Chandravalli. Their coins are mostly minted of lead, belonging to Mulananda c. 125–345. One coin shows an arched hill (or stupa?) with a river motif below on the obverse and a tree within a railed lattice; and a Nandipada to the right on the Reverse.
