= Gudekote =

Village in Kudligi, Vijaynagara district, Karnataka, India

Gudekote is a village in Kudligi taluk in Vijayanagara district in the Indian state of Karnataka.

== Geography ==
It is about 270 km from the state capital of Bangalore and 54 km from the city of Ballari. It was part of the Madras State and transferred to Karnataka after the formation of new states.

== Etymology ==
Legend says that Gudekote was ruled by a king called Banasura, who was an ardent devotee of Lord Shiva and Goddess Parvati. Impressed by his devotion, the divine couple assured him that they would guard the village for eternity. The village was then the size of a city, and was known by the name of its ruler.

British geologist and archaeologist Bruce Foote claimed that the boulders here are so huge, that he hadn't seen any of this size, in all of South India. Gude, in Kannada, is literally translated to a heap or a group. Gudekote is surrounded by hills with huge boulders. The fort (kote, in Kannada) is situated on top of one such rocky hill and possibly gave the name Gudekote to this village.

== History ==
The ruins in and around the village date to prehistoric times. Stone age weapons and delicate ruins have been found in caves and by the sides of boulders, in Appayaganahalli, Panchalingeshwara, Doregudda and other places.

Gudekote was once Mauryan rule, indicated by edicts in nearby Brahmagiri and Siddapura. Satavahana edicts have also been found in nearby Kottur, Kudligi, Shivapura, Choranur, Molakalmuru, Ashoka Siddapura and other places.

It was later ruled by Badami and Kalyana Chalukyas, Rashtrakutas, and saw some development under the rule of Hoysalas and the kings of Hosamanedurga.

Under the Vijayanagar empire, Gudekote was an important administrative centre of the palegars, who ruled for nearly 250 years. Gundalanayaka was the first palegar of Gudekote, along with Bommantaraja, Chinnayyaraja, Immadi Rajappanayaka, Jattingaraja and Shivappanayaka. Toward the end of the 18th century, Hyder Ali and Tipu Sultan captured Gudekote, which went back to the palegars after Tipu lost to the British in 1792. It was transferred to the Nizams in 1799, and then to the British in 1800, and joined Mysore State in 1947.

It is believed that one of Karnataka's brave woman warriors, Onake Obavva, daughter of Chalavadi Chinnapa, was born in Gudekote.

== Gallery ==
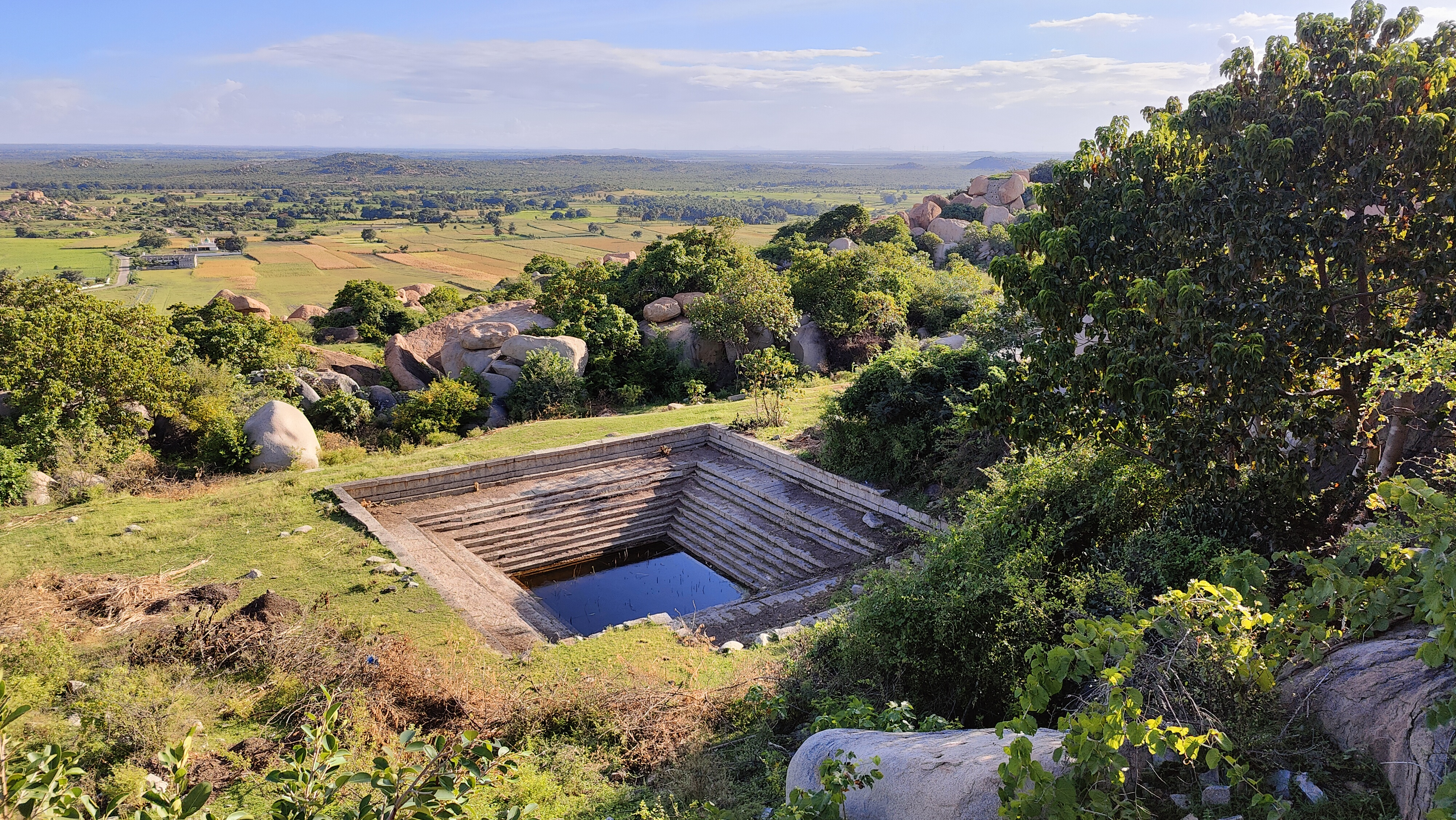
Kalyani at Gudekote fort

== See also ==
- Bellary
- Districts of Karnataka
