= Ittigi, Vijayanagara =

Ittigi
- Village
- Location in Karnataka, India Ittigi (India)
- Coordinates: 14.951661°N 76.094718°E
- Country: India
- State: Karnataka
- District: Vijayanagara
- Taluk: Hoovina Hadagali

Government
  - Body: Grama panchayath

Area
  - Total: 29.43 km^{2} (11.36 sq mi)
- Elevation: 574 m (1,883 ft)

Population (2011)
  - Total: 7,636
  - Density: 259.5/km^{2} (672.0/sq mi)

Languages
  - Official: Kannada
- Time zone: UTC+5:30 (IST)
- PIN: 583220
- Vehicle registration: KA-35

Ittigi is a village in the Hadagali taluk of Vijayanagara district in the state of Karnataka, India. As per census 2011, its location code number is 604639. It is located off Hosapete-Shivamogga Highway, 57 kilometres (35 mi) southwest of Hosapete. It is 22 km from its taluk headquarter, Hoovina Hadagali.
