= Holalu =

- Location in Karnataka, India Holalu (India)
- Coordinates: 15.02°N 75.95°E
- Country: India
- State: Karnataka
- District: Vijayanagara
- Taluk: Hoovinahadagali

Government
  - Body: Gram panchayat

Population (2001)
  - Total: 8,449

Languages
  - Official: Kannada
- Time zone: UTC+5:30 (IST)
- PIN: 583 217
- ISO 3166 code: IN-KA
- Vehicle registration: KA-35
- Civic agency: grama panchayat
- Website: karnataka.gov.in

Holalu is a village in the Hoovinahadagali Taluk of Vijayanagara District of Karnataka, India.

The historical village has been growing up in marketing. The famous Anantashayana temple is also located here.

== Demographics ==
As of 2001 India census, Holalu had a population of 8949 with 4609 males and 4340 females.

== See also ==
- Vijayanagara
- Districts of Karnataka
