= Madalagatti =

Village in Karnataka, India

Coordinates: 15.11037248143468°N 75.88997332136664°E

Madalagatti is a village in Hoovina Hadagali Taluk of Vijayanagara district in Karnataka state, India. There is an old Anjaneya Swami temple, which is a famous temple in this region. Annually, a Jatra takes place during the month of December(15 - 20). Devotees from all over the Gadag district and Bellary district visit the place.

The Madalagatti bridge crosses the Tungabhadra River.
