= Alabur =

- village
- Location in Karnataka, India Alabur (India)
- Coordinates: 14.8980100°N 76.147760°E
- Country: India
- State: Karnataka
- District: Bellary
- Talukas: Hagaribommanahalli

Government
  - Body: Village Panchayat

Languages
  - Official: Kannada
- Time zone: UTC+5:30 (IST)
- ISO 3166 code: IN-KA
- Vehicle registration: KA
- Nearest city: Bellary
- Civic agency: Village Panchayat
- Website: karnataka.gov.in

Alabur is a village in the southern state of Karnataka, India. It is located in the Hagaribommanahalli taluk of Bellary district in Karnataka.

== See also ==
- Bellary
- Districts of Karnataka
