= Uttangi =

- village
- Location in Karnataka, India Uttangi (India)
- Coordinates: 15.02°N 75.95°E
- Country: India
- State: Karnataka
- District: Vijayanagara
- Talukas: Hadagalli

Government
  - Body: Gram panchayat

Population (2001)
  - Total: 5,401

Languages
  - Official: Kannada
- Time zone: UTC+5:30 (IST)
- ISO 3166 code: IN-KA
- Vehicle registration: KA
- Website: karnataka.gov.in

Uttangi is a village in the southern state of Karnataka, India. It is located in the Hadagalli taluk of Vijayanagara district in Karnataka.

== Demographics ==
Uttangi is a large village located in Hadagalli taluka of Vijayanagara district, Karnataka with total 1144 families residing. The Uttangi village has population of 5,666 of which 2,891 are males while 2,775 are females as per the 2011 Census of India.

In Uttangi village population of children with ages of 0-6 is 621 which makes up 10.96 % of total population of the village. Average sex ratio of Uttangi is 960 which is lower than the Karnataka state average of 973. Child sex ratio for the Uttangi as per the 2011 census is 929, lower than Karnataka average of 948.

Uttangi village has higher literacy rate compared to Karnataka. In 2011, literacy rate of Uttangi village was 76.39 % compared to 75.36 % of Karnataka. In Uttangi Male literacy stands at 83.38 % while female literacy rate was 69.14 %.

As per the constitution of India and the Panchyati Raaj Act, Uttangi village is administrated by a sarpanch (head of the village) who is an elected representative of village.

== Notable persons ==
- Channappa Daniel Uttangi, Indian reverend and writer
