= Krishna Nayaka =

Indian politician (born 1983)

Member of the Karnataka Legislative Assembly
- Incumbent
- Assumed office 2023
- Preceded by: P. T. Parameshwar Naik
- Constituency: Hadagali

Personal details
- Born: 1983 (age 42–43) Koilaragatti Thanda, Hoovina Hadagali taluk, Vijayanagara district, Karnataka, India
- Party: Bharatiya Janata Party
- Education: Visvesvaraya Technological University
- Occupation: Politician

Krishna Nayaka or Krishna Naik (born 1983) is an Indian politician from Karnataka. He is an MLA from Hoovina Hadagali Assembly constituency in Vijayanagar district. He won the 2023 Karnataka Legislative Assembly election representing Bharatiya Janata Party.

== Early life and education ==
Nayaka is from Hoovina Hadagali, Vijayanagar district. His father Umla Nayak is a farmer. He completed his graduation degree in engineering at Vishveshvaraya Technological University, Belagavi.

== Career ==
Nayaka won the Hoovina Hadagali Assembly constituency representing Bharatiya Janata Party in the 2023 Karnataka Legislative Assembly election. He polled 73,200 votes and defeated his nearest rival, P. T. Parameshwar Naik of Indian National Congress, by a narrow margin of 1,444 votes.
