= M.P. Ravindra =

Indian politician

Member of Karnataka Legislative Assembly
- In office 2013–2018
- Constituency: Harapanahalli

Personal details
- Born: Hoovina Hadagali, Karnataka, India
- Died: 3 November 2018
- Citizenship: India
- Party: Indian National Congress
- Parents: M. P. Prakash (Former Deputy Chief Minister of Karnataka)
- Relatives: Latha Mallikarjun (Sister)
- Occupation: Politician

M.P. Ravindra (died 3 November 2018) was an Indian politician from the state of Karnataka, who is the Ex - Member of the Karnataka Legislative Assembly from Harapanahalli assembly constituency.

Ravindra is son of former Karnataka Deputy Chief Minister M. P. Prakash.

== Career ==
Ravindra was elected as MLA from Harapanahalli Constituency in 2013 and he lost in May 2018 Assembly Elections.

== Death ==
Ravindra died in Bengaluru on 3 November 2018 due to multiple organ failure.
