= Hulikatte =

Coordinates: 14.462244°N 76.101887°E

- Village
- Location in Karnataka, India
- Country: India
- State: Karnataka
- District: Vijayanagara
- Taluk: Harapanahalli

Languages
  - Official: Kannada
- Time zone: UTC+5:30 (IST)
- Vehicle registration: KA-35

Hulikatte is a village in the Harapanahalli taluk of Vijayanagara district in the Indian state of Karnataka.
