= Chintrapalli =

- village
- Location in Karnataka, India Chintrapalli (India)
- Coordinates: 15.04°N 76.20°E
- Country: India
- State: Karnataka
- District: Bellary
- Talukas: Hagaribommanahalli

Government
  - Body: Gram panchayat

Population (2001)
  - Total: 20,558

Languages
  - Official: Kannada
- Time zone: UTC+5:30 (IST)
- ISO 3166 code: IN-KA
- Vehicle registration: KA
- Website: karnataka.gov.in

Chintrapalli is a village in the southern state of Karnataka, India. It is located in the Hagaribommanahalli taluk of Bellary district in Karnataka.

== Demographics ==
As of 2001 India census, Chintrapalli had a population of 20558 with 10523 males and 10035 females.

== See also ==
- Bellary
- Districts of Karnataka
