= Channappa Uttangi =

Indian author and poet

Channappa Daniel Uttangi (28 October 1881, Uttangi – 1962, Karnataka) was an Indian author and poet.

== Career ==
Channappa Uttangi began his theological studies at the age of twenty at the Basel Seminary. Upon completing his studies Uttangi joined Basel Mission as an Evangelist in 1908. Uttangi's first published work was from a sermon preached at a Hindu gathering in Benares (today Varanasi). Varanasi is known as a symbolic place for Hindu culture and learning.

Uttangi's was awarded by the Kannada Sahitya Sammelana for his groundbreaking work on the Kannada poet Sarvajna. For 25 years Uttangi researched this 16th-century Kannada poet.

The poems of Sarvajna were spread out among the villages. To study these poems Uttangi developed a skill of reading and interpreting the ancient manuscripts preserved on palm leaves. Uttangi would go to the villages stay with the people and collect information on the poems of Sarvajna. In all Uttangi collected 2000 poems and classified them in a systematic manner.

A statue of Channappa Uttangi was unveiled at his native village in Hadagali taluk by the former Chief Minister, N. Dharam Singh in July 2004.

== Works ==
=== Books on Christianity ===
- Bethlehem’s Request to Banares (1921)
- Narayan Waman Tilak (1927)
- The Essence of Sadhu Sundar Singh’s Spiritual Experience: Part I (1939)
- The Essence of Sadhu Sundar Singh’s Spiritual Experience: Part II (1953)
- Mrityunjaya (An account of the Last Days of Jesus Christ) (1963)

=== Books on Lingayatism ===
- Vachanas of Sarvajna (1924)
- Basaveshwara and the Advancement of Karnataka (1923)
- Basaveshwara and the Uplift of Untouchables (1933)
- Vachanas of Miligeya Marayaa and Queen Mahadevi (ed with Prof. S. S. Bhusanurmath, 1950)
- The Historicity of Anubhava Mantapa (1951)
- The collection of Siddharmas's Literary Works (1955)
- Vachana of Adayya (1957)
- Lingayatism and Christianity (1969)
- Anubhava Mantapa: The heart of Virashaivism (1932)

=== Books on Hinduism ===
- Well-Wisher of the Hindu Society (Eradication of Casteisim and National Integration) (1921)
- Yellamma: A Goddess of South India (1995)
- A Complete Concordance to the Bhagvad Gita (Unpublished)

== See also ==
- Lingayat
