= Hiremegalageri =

- village
- Country: India
- State: Karnataka
- District: Vijayanagara
- Talukas: Harapanahalli

Population (2001)
  - Total: 7,675

Languages
  - Official: Kannada
- Time zone: UTC+5:30 (IST)

Hiremegalageri is a village in the southern state of Karnataka, India. It is located in the Harapanahalli taluk of Davanagere district.

== Demographics ==
As of 2001 India census, Hiremegalageri had a population of 7675 with 3897 males and 3778 females.

== See also ==
- Davanagere
- Districts of Karnataka
