= Harapanahalli Assembly constituency =

Legislative Assembly constituency in Karnataka State, India

Coordinates: 14.79°N 75.99°E

Harapanahalli
- Constituency No. 104 for the Karnataka Legislative Assembly

Constituency details
- Country: India
- Region: South India
- State: Karnataka
- District: Vijayanagara
- Lok Sabha constituency: Davanagere
- Established: 1956
- Total electors: 217,175
- Reservation: None

Member of Legislative Assembly
- 16th Karnataka Legislative Assembly
- Incumbent Latha Mallikarjun
- Party: Independent
- Elected year: 2023
- Preceded by: G. Karunakara Reddy

Harapanahalli Assembly constituency is one of the 224 Legislative Assembly constituencies of Karnataka in India.

It is part of Vijayanagara district.Davangere district

== Members of the Legislative Assembly ==
Election	Member	Party
1952	Sirasappa Ijari	Indian National Congress
1957	M. M. J. Sadyojathapaiah	Praja Socialist Party
1957	M. Danappa	Praja Socialist Party
1962	Sirasappa Ijari	Indian National Congress
1967	B. H. Yanka Nayak	Indian National Congress
1972	D. Narayana Das	Indian National Congress
1978	D. Narayana Das	Indian National Congress
1983	B. H. Yanka Naik	Indian National Congress
1985	B. H. Yanka Naik	Indian National Congress
1989	B. H. Yanka Naik	Indian National Congress
1994	D. Narayana Das	Independent politician
1999	P. T. Parameshwar Naik	Indian National Congress
2004	P. T. Parameshwar Naik	Indian National Congress
2008	G. Karunakara Reddy	Bharatiya Janata Party
2013	M.P. Ravindra	Indian National Congress
2018	G. Karunakara Reddy	Bharatiya Janata Party
2023	Latha Mallikarjun	Independent politician

== Election results ==
=== Assembly Election 2023 ===
2023 Karnataka Legislative Assembly election : Harapanahalli
Party	Candidate	Votes	%	±%
Independent	Latha Mallikarjun	70,194	39.56	New
BJP	G. Karunakara Reddy	56,349	31.76	▼8.38
INC	N. Kotreshi	44,988	25.36	▼9.05
NOTA	None of the above	926	0.52	▼0.05
Margin of victory		13,845	7.80	▲2.07
Turnout		177,646	81.80	▼0.87
Total valid votes		177,425		
Registered electors		217,175		▲6.56
Independent gain from BJP		Swing	▼0.58	

=== Assembly Election 2018 ===
2018 Karnataka Legislative Assembly election : Harapanahalli
Party	Candidate	Votes	%	±%
BJP	G. Karunakara Reddy	67,603	40.14	▲7.93
INC	M.P. Ravindra	57,956	34.41	▼3.37
JD(S)	Arasikere N. Kotresh	37,685	22.38	▲20.86
NOTA	None of the above	954	0.57	New
Margin of victory		9,647	5.73	▲0.15
Turnout		168,491	82.67	▲1.38
Total valid votes		168,414		
Registered electors		203,812		▲10.21
BJP gain from INC		Swing	▲2.36	

=== Assembly Election 2013 ===
2013 Karnataka Legislative Assembly election : Harapanahalli
Party	Candidate	Votes	%	±%
INC	M.P. Ravindra	56,954	37.78	▲2.03
BJP	G. Karunakara Reddy	48,548	32.21	▼24.02
KJP	N. Kotreshi	27,997	18.57	New
BSRCP	Siraj Sheikh	9,687	6.43	New
JD(S)	A. G. Viswanath	2,294	1.52	▼2.12
Independent	Rudresha. K. H	1,279	0.85	New
BSP	Kenchappa	933	0.62	▼0.31
Margin of victory		8,406	5.58	▼14.90
Turnout		150,329	81.29	▲0.56
Total valid votes		150,743		
Registered electors		184,938		▲21.18
INC gain from BJP		Swing	▼18.45	

=== Assembly Election 2008 ===
2008 Karnataka Legislative Assembly election : Harapanahalli
Party	Candidate	Votes	%	±%
BJP	G. Karunakara Reddy	69,235	56.23	New
INC	M. P. Prakash	44,017	35.75	▼0.59
JD(S)	P. Ramanagouda	4,479	3.64	▼16.11
Independent	B. Hanumanthappa	1,690	1.37	New
BSP	H. M. Maheshwara Swamy	1,147	0.93	New
CPI	Hosalli Mallesh	1,086	0.88	New
Margin of victory		25,218	20.48	▲12.87
Turnout		123,201	80.73	▲12.79
Total valid votes		123,133		
Registered electors		152,613		▼1.26
BJP gain from INC		Swing	▲19.89	

=== Assembly Election 2004 ===
2004 Karnataka Legislative Assembly election : Harapanahalli
Party	Candidate	Votes	%	±%
INC	P. T. Parameshwar Naik	38,158	36.34	▲2.38
Independent	D. Narayana Das	30,164	28.73	New
JD(S)	Naik. M. P	20,734	19.75	New
JD(U)	Srikrishna S. Alias T. Nallappa	6,157	5.86	▼8.27
JP	Bhavanimatha Mukunda Rao	4,332	4.13	New
Independent	Lokamma. K	2,962	2.82	New
Kannada Nadu Party	Rukminamma. P. T	2,496	2.38	New
Margin of victory		7,994	7.61	▼4.19
Turnout		105,010	67.94	▼4.90
Total valid votes		105,003		
Registered electors		154,558		▲15.86
INC hold		Swing	▲2.38	

=== Assembly Election 1999 ===
1999 Karnataka Legislative Assembly election : Harapanahalli
Party	Candidate	Votes	%	±%
INC	P. T. Parameshwar Naik	30,316	33.96	▲13.21
Independent	B. H. Yanka Naik	19,779	22.16	New
Independent	V. Thimmappa	13,578	15.21	New
JD(U)	D. Narayana Das	12,616	14.13	New
Independent	S. Sreekrishna (Nallappa)	12,011	13.45	New
Independent	Haleshi. A. K	970	1.09	New
Margin of victory		10,537	11.80	▲6.72
Turnout		97,173	72.84	▲3.03
Total valid votes		89,270		
Rejected ballots		7,784	8.01	▲5.46
Registered electors		133,401		▲7.51
INC gain from Independent		Swing	▲8.14	

=== Assembly Election 1994 ===
1994 Karnataka Legislative Assembly election : Harapanahalli
Party	Candidate	Votes	%	±%
Independent	D. Narayana Das	21,798	25.82	New
INC	B. H. Yanka Naik	17,514	20.75	▼29.38
Independent	V. Thimmappa	15,752	18.66	New
JD	R. Chandra Naik	13,784	16.33	▼27.91
BJP	V. N. Jayaram	10,217	12.10	New
INC	K. Yanka Naik	4,784	5.67	New
Margin of victory		4,284	5.08	▼0.81
Turnout		86,618	69.81	▲1.16
Total valid votes		84,412		
Rejected ballots		2,206	2.55	▼4.76
Registered electors		124,084		▲7.51
Independent gain from INC		Swing	▼24.31	

=== Assembly Election 1989 ===
1989 Karnataka Legislative Assembly election : Harapanahalli
Party	Candidate	Votes	%	±%
INC	B. H. Yanka Naik	36,818	50.13	▲2.08
JD	R. Chandra Naik	32,492	44.24	New
JP	B. H. Durugappa	3,653	4.97	New
Independent	K. Uchangeppa	476	0.65	New
Margin of victory		4,326	5.89	▼3.23
Turnout		79,227	68.65	▼1.40
Total valid votes		73,439		
Rejected ballots		5,788	7.31	▲5.17
Registered electors		115,411		▲30.16
INC hold		Swing	▲2.08	

=== Assembly Election 1985 ===
1985 Karnataka Legislative Assembly election : Harapanahalli
Party	Candidate	Votes	%	±%
INC	B. H. Yanka Naik	29,206	48.05	▼8.58
JP	D. Narayana Das	23,662	38.93	▲8.86
Independent	B. Y. Nemya Naik	7,153	11.77	New
Independent	Sangeeta Vidwan Sanna Hanumanthappa Ittigudi	498	0.82	New
Margin of victory		5,544	9.12	▼17.44
Turnout		62,114	70.05	▲2.10
Total valid votes		60,782		
Rejected ballots		1,332	2.14	▼0.74
Registered electors		88,669		▲13.29
INC hold		Swing	▼8.58	

=== Assembly Election 1983 ===
1983 Karnataka Legislative Assembly election : Harapanahalli
Party	Candidate	Votes	%	±%
INC	B. H. Yanka Naik	29,249	56.63	▲48.42
JP	D. Seelya Naik	15,532	30.07	▼9.80
Independent	D. Narayana Das	6,871	13.30	New
Margin of victory		13,717	26.56	▲14.50
Turnout		53,182	67.95	▼4.06
Total valid votes		51,652		
Rejected ballots		1,530	2.88	▼0.49
Registered electors		78,268		▲7.76
INC gain from INC(I)		Swing	▲4.70	

=== Assembly Election 1978 ===
1978 Karnataka Legislative Assembly election : Harapanahalli
Party	Candidate	Votes	%	±%
INC(I)	D. Narayana Das	26,244	51.93	New
JP	B. Y. Nemya Naik	20,151	39.87	New
INC	B. H. Yanka Naik	4,147	8.21	▼52.12
Margin of victory		6,093	12.06	▼11.81
Turnout		52,303	72.01	▲12.54
Total valid votes		50,542		
Rejected ballots		1,761	3.37	▲3.37
Registered electors		72,632		▼10.21
INC(I) gain from INC		Swing	▼8.40	

=== Assembly Election 1972 ===
1972 Mysore State Legislative Assembly election : Harapanahalli
Party	Candidate	Votes	%	±%
INC	Dinarayanada	28,033	60.33	▲0.19
INC(O)	B. Y. Nemya Naik	16,939	36.45	New
Independent	T. Naliappa	1,496	3.22	New
Margin of victory		11,094	23.87	▲3.59
Turnout		48,107	59.47	▲2.81
Total valid votes		46,468		
Registered electors		80,893		▲15.61
INC hold		Swing	▲0.19	

=== Assembly Election 1967 ===
1967 Mysore State Legislative Assembly election : Harapanahalli
Party	Candidate	Votes	%	±%
INC	Y. Nayak	22,201	60.14	▲3.33
Independent	V. Shivanna	14,716	39.86	New
Margin of victory		7,485	20.28	▲6.66
Turnout		39,645	56.66	▼23.33
Total valid votes		36,917		
Registered electors		69,971		▲5.76
INC hold		Swing	▲3.33	

=== Assembly Election 1962 ===
1962 Mysore State Legislative Assembly election : Harapanahalli
Party	Candidate	Votes	%	±%
INC	Sirasappa Ijari	28,440	56.81	▲9.59
PSP	Sanganna Mudenur	21,620	43.19	▼9.59
Margin of victory		6,820	13.62	▲10.40
Turnout		52,924	79.99	▲13.70
Total valid votes		50,060		
Registered electors		66,160		▼38.04
INC gain from PSP		Swing	▲29.58	

=== Assembly Election 1957 ===
1957 Mysore State Legislative Assembly election : Harapanahalli
Party	Candidate	Votes	%	±%
PSP	M. M. J. Sadyojathapaiah	38,550	27.23	New
PSP	M. Danappa	36,162	25.55	New
INC	Sirasappa Ijari	33,988	24.01	▼27.12
INC	M. Muniya Naik	32,860	23.21	▼27.92
Margin of victory		4,562	3.22	▲0.97
Turnout		141,560	66.29	▼0.21
Total valid votes		141,560		
Registered electors		106,777		▲37.39
PSP gain from INC		Swing	▼23.90	

=== Assembly Election 1952 ===
1952 Madras State Legislative Assembly election : Harapanahalli
Party	Candidate	Votes	%	±%
INC	Sirasappa Ijari	26,425	51.13	New
Independent	K. B. R. Kotra Goud	25,261	48.87	New
Margin of victory		1,164	2.25	
Turnout		51,686	66.50	
Total valid votes		51,686		
Registered electors		77,721		
INC win (new seat)				

== See also ==
- List of constituencies of the Karnataka Legislative Assembly
- Vijayanagara district
