= Hadagali Assembly constituency =

Legislative Assembly constituency in Karnataka State, India

Coordinates: 15.02°N 75.93°E

Hadagalli
- Constituency No. 88 for the Karnataka Legislative Assembly

Constituency details
- Country: India
- Region: South India
- State: Karnataka
- District: Vijayanagara
- Lok Sabha constituency: Bellary
- Established: 1956
- Total electors: 191,338
- Reservation: SC

Member of Legislative Assembly
- 16th Karnataka Legislative Assembly
- Incumbent Krishna Nayaka
- Party: Bharatiya Janata Party
- Elected year: 2023
- Preceded by: P. T. Parameshwar Naik

Hadagali Assembly constituency formerly Hoovina Hadagali is one of the 224 Legislative Assembly constituencies of Karnataka in India.

It is part of Vijayanagara district and is reserved for candidates belonging to the Scheduled Castes. Krishna Nayaka is the current MLA of Hoovina Hadagali constituency.

== Members of the Legislative Assembly ==
Election	Member	Party
1957	M. P. Mariswamiah	Indian National Congress
1962	Angadi Channabasappa	Praja Socialist Party
1967	N. M. K. Sogi	Indian National Congress
1972	Andaneppa. C	Indian National Congress
1978	Karibasavanagoud Kogali	Indian National Congress
1983	M. P. Prakash	Janata Party
1985	M. P. Prakash	Janata Party
1989	E. T. Shambunatha	Indian National Congress
1994	M. P. Prakash	Janata Dal
1999	Halappa. V. B	Indian National Congress
2004	M. P. Prakash	Janata Dal
2008	Chandranaik. B	Bharatiya Janata Party
2013	P. T. Parameshwar Naik	Indian National Congress
2018	P. T. Parameshwar Naik	Indian National Congress
2023	Krishna Nayaka	Bharatiya Janata Party

== Election results ==
=== Assembly Election 2023 ===
2023 Karnataka Legislative Assembly election : Hadagali
Party	Candidate	Votes	%	±%
BJP	Krishna Nayaka	73,200	48.81%	▲28.63
INC	P. T. Parameshwar Naik	71,756	47.85%	▲9.20
JD(S)	Puthresh Kayannanavar	1,847	1.23%	▼4.72
NOTA	None of the above	823	0.55%	▼0.90
Margin of victory		1,444	0.96%	▼5.60
Turnout		150,172	78.49%	▲1.68
Total valid votes		149,956		
Registered electors		191,338		▲4.58
BJP gain from INC		Swing	▲10.16	

=== Assembly Election 2018 ===
2018 Karnataka Legislative Assembly election : Hadagali
Party	Candidate	Votes	%	±%
INC	P. T. Parameshwar Naik	54,097	38.65%	▼2.32
Independent	Odo Gangappa	44,919	32.09%	New
BJP	Chandranaik. B	28,255	20.18%	▲7.39
JD(S)	Kayannanavara Putrappa	8,327	5.95%	▲3.28
AIMEP	Krishna Naik. L	1,534	1.10%	New
NOTA	None of the above	2,025	1.45%	New
Margin of victory		9,178	6.56%	▼21.62
Turnout		140,522	76.81%	▲2.92
Total valid votes		139,981		
Registered electors		182,959		▲16.32
INC hold		Swing	▼2.32	

=== Assembly Election 2013 ===
2013 Karnataka Legislative Assembly election : Hadagali
Party	Candidate	Votes	%	±%
INC	P. T. Parameshwar Naik	59,336	40.97%	▼0.15
BJP	Chandranaik. B	18,526	12.79%	▼35.48
KJP	Madhunaik. L	18,178	12.55%	New
BSRCP	Hemanhtkumar Bharati	10,300	7.11%	New
JD(S)	Dr. L. P. Naik Katari	3,861	2.67%	▼0.77
Independent	Harish Kumar. V	2,098	1.45%	New
BSP	K. Uchhengappa	1,113	0.77%	▼1.26
CPI(ML)L	B. J. Raghavendranaik	927	0.64%	New
ANC	A. K. Honnurappa	885	0.61%	New
Margin of victory		40,810	28.18%	▲21.03
Turnout		116,218	73.89%	▲8.66
Total valid votes		144,826		
Registered electors		157,287		▲12.54
INC gain from BJP		Swing	▼7.30	

=== Assembly Election 2008 ===
2008 Karnataka Legislative Assembly election : Hadagali
Party	Candidate	Votes	%	±%
BJP	Chandranaik. B	43,992	48.27%	New
INC	P. T. Parameshwar Naik	37,474	41.12%	▲16.13
JD(S)	M. P. Naik	3,132	3.44%	▼51.62
Independent	Harish Kumar. V	2,302	2.53%	New
BSP	H. M. Mahesh	1,853	2.03%	New
Independent	K. Uchangappa	1,067	1.17%	New
Independent	V. Dyamappa	763	0.84%	New
JD(U)	S. Moti Naik	549	0.60%	▼14.25
Margin of victory		6,518	7.15%	▼22.92
Turnout		91,167	65.23%	▼5.88
Total valid votes		91,132		
Registered electors		139,757		▼11.63
BJP gain from JD(S)		Swing	▼6.79	

=== Assembly Election 2004 ===
2004 Karnataka Legislative Assembly election : Hadagali
Party	Candidate	Votes	%	±%
JD(S)	M. P. Prakash	61,863	55.06%	New
INC	Halappa. V. B	28,077	24.99%	▼25.57
JD(U)	Kotraiah Guruvina	16,688	14.85%	▼32.68
Urs Samyuktha Paksha	Mrutyunjaya Jyothi	1,963	1.75%	New
Kannada Nadu Party	Shridhara Naik. N	1,478	1.32%	New
Independent	Lakkannanavara Mallappa	1,371	1.22%	New
Independent	Nagaraja. T	916	0.82%	New
Margin of victory		33,786	30.07%	▲27.03
Turnout		112,461	71.11%	▼3.26
Total valid votes		112,356		
Registered electors		158,155		▲10.70
JD(S) gain from INC		Swing	▲4.50	

=== Assembly Election 1999 ===
1999 Karnataka Legislative Assembly election : Hadagali
Party	Candidate	Votes	%	±%
INC	Halappa. V. B	51,434	50.56%	▲17.37
JD(U)	M. P. Prakash	48,344	47.53%	New
Independent	Dr Ab Mallappa Chigateri	1,943	1.91%	New
Margin of victory		3,090	3.04%	▼24.37
Turnout		106,252	74.37%	▼0.46
Total valid votes		101,721		
Rejected ballots		4,445	4.18%	▲1.92
Registered electors		142,871		▲7.23
INC gain from JD		Swing	▼10.05	

=== Assembly Election 1994 ===
1994 Karnataka Legislative Assembly election : Hadagali
Party	Candidate	Votes	%	±%
JD	M. P. Prakash	59,056	60.61%	▲14.26
INC	Kotraiah Guruvina	32,345	33.19%	▼16.09
INC	E. T. Shambunatha	2,652	2.72%	New
BJP	C. G. M. Channaveeraiah	2,290	2.35%	New
KRRS	Muddannawara Bheemanagouda	794	0.81%	New
Margin of victory		26,711	27.41%	▲24.48
Turnout		99,703	74.83%	▲0.16
Total valid votes		97,441		
Rejected ballots		2,257	2.26%	▼3.06
Registered electors		133,242		▲9.18
JD gain from INC		Swing	▲11.33	

=== Assembly Election 1989 ===
1989 Karnataka Legislative Assembly election : Hadagali
Party	Candidate	Votes	%	±%
INC	E. T. Shambunatha	42,518	49.28%	▲10.57
JD	M. P. Prakash	39,989	46.35%	New
JP	K. Veeranagoud	3,009	3.49%	New
Margin of victory		2,529	2.93%	▼17.70
Turnout		91,129	74.67%	▼1.32
Total valid votes		86,277		
Rejected ballots		4,852	5.32%	▲3.52
Registered electors		122,038		▲20.44
INC gain from JP		Swing	▼10.06	

=== Assembly Election 1985 ===
1985 Karnataka Legislative Assembly election : Hadagali
Party	Candidate	Votes	%	±%
JP	M. P. Prakash	44,870	59.34%	▼0.49
INC	G. Andanappa	29,268	38.71%	▲3.34
Independent	R. Shankar Naik	1,044	1.38%	New
Margin of victory		15,602	20.63%	▼3.83
Turnout		76,997	75.99%	▲5.08
Total valid votes		75,612		
Rejected ballots		1,385	1.80%	▼1.60
Registered electors		101,331		▲13.02
JP hold		Swing	▼0.49	

=== Assembly Election 1983 ===
1983 Karnataka Legislative Assembly election : Hadagali
Party	Candidate	Votes	%	±%
JP	M. P. Prakash	36,740	59.83%	▲19.65
INC	B. Lankeppa	21,719	35.37%	▲24.02
Independent	Mrutyunjaya Jyothi	1,949	3.17%	New
Independent	D. M. Yunus	1,004	1.63%	New
Margin of victory		15,021	24.46%	▲17.44
Turnout		63,575	70.91%	▼0.62
Total valid votes		61,412		
Rejected ballots		2,163	3.40%	▼0.21
Registered electors		89,655		▲8.23
JP gain from INC(I)		Swing	▲12.63	

=== Assembly Election 1978 ===
1978 Karnataka Legislative Assembly election : Hadagali
Party	Candidate	Votes	%	±%
INC(I)	Karibasavanagoud Kogali	26,962	47.20%	New
JP	M. P. Prakash	22,952	40.18%	New
INC	P. Ravanagound	6,483	11.35%	▼48.97
Independent	C. B. Siddappa	721	1.26%	New
Margin of victory		4,010	7.02%	▼13.62
Turnout		59,258	71.53%	▼1.56
Total valid votes		57,118		
Rejected ballots		2,140	3.61%	▲3.61
Registered electors		82,840		▲10.94
INC(I) gain from INC		Swing	▼13.12	

=== Assembly Election 1972 ===
1972 Mysore State Legislative Assembly election : Hadagali
Party	Candidate	Votes	%	±%
INC	Andaneppa. C	31,859	60.32%	▼0.67
INC(O)	N. M. Kotrabasavaiah Sogi	20,956	39.68%	New
Margin of victory		10,903	20.64%	▼1.35
Turnout		54,576	73.09%	▲0.36
Total valid votes		52,815		
Registered electors		74,672		▲12.19
INC hold		Swing	▼0.67	

=== Assembly Election 1967 ===
1967 Mysore State Legislative Assembly election : Hadagali
Party	Candidate	Votes	%	±%
INC	N. M. K. Sogi	27,462	60.99%	▲18.94
PSP	Andaneppa. C	17,563	39.01%	▼18.94
Margin of victory		9,899	21.99%	▲6.09
Turnout		48,406	72.73%	▲8.23
Total valid votes		45,025		
Registered electors		66,557		▲2.99
INC gain from PSP		Swing	▲3.04	

=== Assembly Election 1962 ===
1962 Mysore State Legislative Assembly election : Hadagali
Party	Candidate	Votes	%	±%
PSP	Angadi Channabasappa	22,694	57.95%	▲9.19
INC	Bhavi Lingappa	16,469	42.05%	▼9.19
Margin of victory		6,225	15.90%	▲13.42
Turnout		41,682	64.50%	▼5.56
Total valid votes		39,163		
Registered electors		64,622		▲12.23
PSP gain from INC		Swing	▲6.71	

=== Assembly Election 1957 ===
1957 Mysore State Legislative Assembly election : Hadagali
Party	Candidate	Votes	%	±%
INC	M. P. Mariswamiah	20,673	51.24%	New
PSP	Angadi Channabasappa	19,671	48.76%	New
Margin of victory		1,002	2.48%	
Turnout		40,344	70.06%	
Total valid votes		40,344		
Registered electors		57,581		
INC win (new seat)				

== See also ==
- List of constituencies of the Karnataka Legislative Assembly
- Vijayanagara district
