= Malebennur =

- Town
- Location in Karnataka, India
- Coordinates: 14.35°N 75.733°E
- Country: India
- State: Karnataka
- District: Davanagere district

Government
  - Type: Town Municipal Council
  - Body: Town Municipal Council
- Elevation: 606.9 m (1,991 ft)

Population (2020)
  - Total: 50−52 thousand

Languages
  - Official: Kannada
- Time zone: UTC+5:30 (IST)
- PIN: 577 530
- Telephone code: (91) 08192
- ISO 3166 code: IN-KA
- Vehicle registration: KA-17
- Website: karnataka.gov.in

Malebennur is a town in the Davanagere district of the state of Karnataka, India. It is known for Rice Mills, good quality rice been produced here and exports to other states too. Commercial township for several Villages around it. Malebennuru is also the entrance of Malenadu.
