= Teligi, India =

Teligi
- Village
- Location in Karnataka, India
- Coordinates: 14°40′N 75°54′E
- Country: India
- State: Karnataka
- District: Vijayanagara
- Taluk: Harapanahalli

Government
  - Body: Grama Panchayath

Area
  - Total: 23.62 km^{2} (9.12 sq mi)

Population (2011)
  - Total: 6,304
  - Density: 266.9/km^{2} (691.2/sq mi)

Languages
  - Official: Kannada
- Time zone: UTC+05:30 (IST)
- PIN: 583 137
- Vehicle registration: KA-17
- Website: https://www.instagram.com/pureacres_organic/

Teligi is a village in the Kalyana Karnataka region of northeastern part of state Karnataka, which connects kalyana karnataka with middle karnataka away from 20 km both Harapanahalli and Harihara in India. It is located in the Harapanahalli taluk of Vijayanagara District.

== Demographics ==
As of 2001 India census, Teligi had a population of 6080 with 3054 males and 3026 females.

== See also ==
- Vijayanagara
- Districts of Karnataka
- Harapanahalli
- Taluks of Karnataka
