= M. P. Prakash =

Politician of Karnataka, Lawyer, Writer and Actor

Deputy Chief Minister of Karnataka
- In office 8 August 2005 – 28 January 2006
- Preceded by: Siddaramaiah
- Succeeded by: B. S. Yeddyurappa
- Constituency: Hoovina Hadagali, Bellary district

Member of the Karnataka Legislative Assembly for Hadagali
- In office 1983–1989
- Preceded by: Karibasavanagoud Kogali
- Succeeded by: E. T. Shambunatha
- In office 1994–1999
- Preceded by: E. T. Shambunatha
- Succeeded by: V. B. Halappa
- In office 2004–2008
- Preceded by: V. B. Halappa
- Succeeded by: B. Chandra Naik

Personal details
- Born: 11 July 1940 Vallabhapura.hagaribommanahalli, Hyderabad State (now in Karnataka), British India
- Died: 9 February 2011 (aged 70) Bangalore, Karnataka, India
- Party: Indian National Congress (2008–2011)
- Other political affiliations: Janata Party (1983–1988); Janata Dal (1988–1999); Janata Dal (United) (1999–2004); Janata Dal (Secular) (2004–2008)
- Spouse: Rudrambha
- Children: 4; including Latha Mallikarjun (daughter) M.P. Ravindra

Matada Patil Prakash (11 July 1940 – 9 February 2011), was an Indian politician, film actor, director who was the Deputy Chief Minister of Karnataka from 2005 to 2006. Prakash was also a theatre enthusiast. He directed and acted in Kannada plays. He died on 9 February 2011 in Bangalore at the age of 71.

== Career ==
Born on 11 July 1940 at Vallabhapura in Hagari Bommanahalli taluk, Bellary District, Prakash was an advocate by profession. He was elected to the Legislative Assembly four times. He first entered the Assembly from Hoovina Hadagali in 1983 on the Janata Party ticket and was re-elected thrice. He served as a minister handling various portfolios in all the Janata governments under various Chief ministers such as Ramakrishna Hegde, S.R.Bommai, H. D. Deve Gowda, J.H.Patel, Dharam Singh and H.D.Kumaraswamy. He was the deputy chief minister in the Congress-Janata Dal-Secular coalition for a brief while during 2005–06.

== Death ==
He died on 9 February 2011 due to cancer in a private hospital at Bangalore. His funeral took place at Hadagali, his home town in Bellary and was attended by thousands of people.

Political offices
Preceded by Siddaramaiah	Deputy Chief Minister of Karnataka; 8 August 2005 – 28 January 2006	Succeeded by B.S. Yeddyurappa
