= P. T. Parameshwar Naik =

Indian politician

Minister of Labour Department of Karnataka
- In office 2013–N/A
- Preceded by: B. N. Bache Gowda
- Succeeded by: Santosh Lad

Member of the Karnataka Legislative Assembly
- In office 2013–2023
- Preceded by: B. Chandra Naik
- Succeeded by: Krishna Nayaka
- Constituency: Hadagali
- In office 1999–2008
- Preceded by: D. Narayanadas
- Succeeded by: G. Karunakara Reddy
- Constituency: Harapanahalli

Personal details
- Born: 11 May 1964 (age 62)
- Party: Indian National Congress
- Occupation: Politician

P. T. Parameshwar Naik is an Indian politician from the state of Karnataka. He is a former member of the Karnataka Legislative Assembly representing the Hoovina Hadagali constituency.

== Political career ==
Naik is from the Indian National Congress. He was the Minister for Labour in the K. Siddaramaiah led Karnataka Government.

== Controversy ==
It was alleged that he abruptly transferred a senior police official Anupama Shenoy for not attending his phone call.
