= Kudligi =

- Town
- Nickname: Junior City of India
- Location in Karnataka, India
- Coordinates: 14.9°N 76.38°E
- Country: India
- State: Karnataka
- District: Vijayanagara
- Named for: Tamarind Plants

Government
  - Body: Panchayat town

Area
  - Total: 18 km^{2} (6.9 sq mi)
- Elevation: 596 m (1,955 ft)

Population (2011)
  - Total: 21,855

Languages
  - Official: Kannada
- Time zone: UTC+5:30 (IST)
- Postal code: 583 135
- Vehicle registration: KA 35
- Website: www.wikipedia.com/Kudligikarnataka.gov.in

Kudligi is a panchayat town in Vijayanagara district in the India state of Karnataka. Kudligi is famous for its local Tamarind. Once upon a time Kudligi was called as "The Land of rich spices" for foreign tourists who came to Hampi. Now it is called as "The Tamarind land". Here Kotthala Anjaneya festival is popular during Ugadhi Festival. Kudligi was ruled by few kings from Jarmali and Madakari kingdom. Gandhiji Chithabasma was carried by Bindu Madava and his friend Guddada Karnam Venkoba Rao.

Jawahar Navodaya Vidyalaya of Vijayanagara District is in the village of Chikkajogihalli where Indira Gandhi arrived once during a campaign.

Makanadaku is a village famous for Kanchobaleshwara Temple.

== Geography ==
Kudligi is located at 14.9°N 76.38°E. It has an average elevation of 596 metres (1955 feet). The oldest temple, Shri Hulikunteraya Temple, Bommaghatta (Brahmaghatta), is 23 km away. The three main attractions of Kudligi Town are Mahatma Gandhiji Chithabasma located at Mahadeva Mylara play ground and second highest Big Banyan tree in Karnataka (it also called as Maliyammana aaladamara) located Choornur road, Kudligi, and National Highway 50 connecting Nanded to Chitradurga with four lanes. Gudekote Sloth Bear Sanctuary it is spread over 38.48 km (14.86sq mi) sanctuary was created exclusively for the preservation of the Sloth Bear. Jarmali Forest and Shivapura Forest are the main forest areas, people mainly depends upon largely grown tamarind and its parts. The biggest Banyan tree troops nearby town is most attractive. Literacy is low due to unemployment, the main occupations are agriculture and mining.

== Demographics ==
As of 2001 India census, Kudligi had a population of 21,855. Males constitute 51% of the population and females 49%. Kudligi has an average literacy rate of 54%, lower than the national average of 59.5%: male literacy is 62%, and female literacy is 46%. In Kudligi, 15% of the population is under 6 years of age. Major temples include Sollamma temple, Ooramma temple, and Kottala Anjaneya temple.
