= Hagaribommanahalli =

- Town
- Nickname: HB.Halli
- Location in Karnataka, India Hagaribommanahalli (India)
- Coordinates: 15.04°N 76.20°E
- Country: India
- State: Karnataka
- District: Vijayanagara district
- Boroughs: Hagaribommanahalli

Population (2011)
  - Total: 47,042

Languages
  - Official: Kannada
- Time zone: UTC+5:30 (IST)
- PIN: 583 212
- Vehicle registration: KA-35

Hagaribommanahalli is a town and a taluk in Vijayanagara District in the Indian state of Karnataka. It is the administrative headquarters of the Hagaribommanahalli Taluk.

== Demographics ==
As of 2001 India census, Hagari Bommanahalli had a population of 24000.

== Food ==
Jowar Rotti is the staple food here, along with Yennegai Palya (Brinjal/Eggplant Curry). and Peanut powder.

== Transport ==
=== Road ===
1.Bengaluru-Chitradurga-Davanagere-Harihara-Harapanahalli- Hagaribommanahalli.

2.Bengaluru-Chitradurga-Jagalur-Kotturu-Hagaribommanahalli.

3.Bengaluru-Chitradurga-Kudligi-Hagaribommanahalli.

4.Mangaluru-Manipal-Kundapura-Shivamogga-Harihara-Harapanahalli-Hagaribommanahalli.

5.Bellary-Hosapete-Hagaribommanahalli.

6.Hyderabad-Raichur-Sindhanur-Gangavathi-Hosapete-Hagaribommanahalli.

7.Hyderabad-Hosapete-Hagaribommanahalli.

8.Mumbai-Pune-Belagavi-Hubballi-Gadag-Hosapete-Hagaribommanahalli.

=== Railways ===
Hagaribommanahalli railway station (HBI) was one of the railway stations on the Hosapete-Kotturu railway meter gauge line. In 1995 this line was closed for gauge conversion and also for extending the railway line from Kotturu to Davangere to join Hubballi-Bengaluru Railway line at Amaravathi colony. After numerous delays this railway line was opened and now Hagaribommanahalli is well connected with Hosapete, Ballari, Davanagere and Bangaluru.

== See also ==
- Vijayanagara
- Districts of Karnataka
