= Hoovina Hadagali =

HuvinaHadagali
- Town
- Coordinates: 15°1′2″N 75°56′10″E
- Country: India
- State: Karnataka
- District: Vijayanagara
- Subdivision: Huvina Hadagali

Government
  - Body: Town Municipal Council

Area
  - Town: 19.84 km^{2} (7.66 sq mi)
  - Rural: 928.12 km^{2} (358.35 sq mi)
- Elevation: 532 m (1,745 ft)

Population (2011)
  - Town: 27,967
  - Density: 1,410/km^{2} (3,651/sq mi)
  - Rural: 167,252

Languages
  - Official: Kannada
- Time zone: UTC+5:30 (IST)
- PIN: 583 219
- Telephone code: 08399
- Vehicle registration: KA 35

Hoovina Hadagali or Huvina Hadagali is a town and a taluk in the Vijayanagara district of Karnataka, India. It is the administrative headquarters of the Huvina-Hadagali Taluk.

== Historical names of Huvina Hadagali ==
- Puvina-Posavadangile

An inscription found on a slab set up at the western entrance into the Keshavaswami temple at Huvina Hadagali, records that "Rebbaladevi, wife of the brave Brahman general Ravideva or Raviga caused the construction of the temple of Kesavadeva in Puvina-Posavadangile, which was her birthplace and having set up the god in the temple, made grants of many plots of land for the service of the god and for maintaining a feeding house for Brahmans, a flower garden and a house for the satra, in the presence of the Brahman Mahajanas of the place".

- Puvina-Padangile

An inscription found on a slab set in the front of the Anjaneya temple at Yenigi, Hadagali Taluk, records that "while the king (the Sevuna Yadava king Kandharadeva or Kannara (1247-1261)) was camping at the nelevidu of Devagiri, the 120 Brahman Mahajanas of Puvina-Padangile, who are described as very learned in the Vedas and the Shastras, performing Aupasana and Agnihotra and as ripukula-kadali-vana-kunjarar (as destructive to enemies as elephants to a forest of plantain-trees) and saranagata-vajra-panjarar (mail-armour to those who seek shelter under them), made a gift of various plots of land of specified boundary, for the service of the god Kusmanatha at the village." Puvina-Padangile is stated to have been "situated in the Kogali-nadu, which was the eye of the Nolambavadi-nadu which again was, as it were, the nose of Kuntala-desa".

== Demographics ==
As of 2001 India census, Huvina Hadagali had a population of 23,404. Males constitute 51% of the population and females 49%. Huvina Hadagali has an average literacy rate of 60%, higher than the national average of 59.5%: male literacy is 67%, and female literacy is 53%. In Huvina Hadagali, 14% of the population is under 6 years of age.

== Notable peoples ==
- C. R. Rao (1920–2023), mathematician and statistician, was born in Hoovina Hadagali.
- M. P. Prakash, lawyer and ex-Home Minister, was born in Hoovina Hadagali.
- Krishna Nayaka, MLA of Hadagali Constituency
- P. T. Parameshwar Naik, Ex MLA of Hadagali Constituency
- B.Chandra Naik, Former MLA of Hadagali Constituency

== Tourist places ==
1. Kalleshwara Temple (Sogi - 10 km.)
2. Panduranga Temple
3. Kalleshwara Temple, Hire Hadagali (20 km.)
4. Bettadamalleshwara Temple (20 km.)
5. Anjaneya Temple, Madalagatta
6. Suryanarayan Temple (Hoysala period), Magala
7. Huligudda
8. Singataluru Dam
9. Gavimata
10. Tungabhadra river

== Places to visit ==
1. Singataluru Dam (15 km.)
2. Madalagatta Temple Hanuman and river crossing
3. Navali on the banks of Tungabhadra River
4. Magala on the banks of Tungabhadra River
5. Hire Hadagali Kalleshwara Temple and Mutt (14 km.)
6. Mailaralingeshwara Temple and Mailara Bridge (36 km.)
7. Kuruvatti Basaveshwara Temple of Kuruvatti, built by Jakanacharya (41 km.)
8. Sri Channaveereshwara Matha of Sri Ma Ni Pra Channaveerashivayogigalu of Jangamakshetra, Linganayakanahalli (51 km.)
