= Harapanahalli =

- City
- Harapanahalli in Karnataka
- Coordinates: 14.78833°N 75.98639°E
- Country: India
- State: Karnataka
- District: Vijayanagara

Government
  - Body: Harapanahalli City Municipal Council (CMC)

Area
  - City: 41 km^{2} (16 sq mi)
  - Rural: 1,396 km^{2} (539 sq mi)
- Elevation: 646.19 m (2,120.0 ft)

Population (2011)
  - City: 57,431
  - Density: 1,400/km^{2} (3,600/sq mi)
  - Rural: 254,964

Languages
  - Official: Kannada
- Time zone: UTC+5:30 (IST)
- PIN: 583 131
- Telephone code: +918398
- Vehicle registration: KA-35
- Distance from Hosapete: 78 kilometres (48 mi)
- Distance from Bengaluru: 292 kilometres (181 mi)
- Website: http://www.harapanahallicity.mrc.gov.in

Harapanahalli is a small city, taluk and sub-divisional headquarter in Vijayanagara District in the Indian state of Karnataka.

In 1947, the 30th Kannada Sahithya Sammelana was organised in Harapanahalli under the presidency of C.K.Venkataramaiah.

== Geography ==
It has an average elevation of 633 metres (2,077 ft) above the Mean sea level. Harapanahalli is surrounded by several districts like Davanagere in the South, Chithradurga in the Southeast, Haveri in the West.

Previously, Harapanahalli was under Ballari district, Davanagere district and then transferred back to Ballari, until the Vijayanagara district was carved out in the year 2021.

Harapanahalli has a sub divisional headquarter considering Harapanahalli, Huvinahadagali and Kotturu taluks with Assistant Commissioner office. It had 144 villages in its taluk boundary, and it is one of the oldest and highest revenue generating center with high trading and educational outposts since from Madras Presidency.

== Demographics ==
As of 2001 India census, Harapanahalli had a population of 41,889. Males constituted 52% of the population and females 48%. Harapanahalli had an average literacy rate of 55%, lower than the national average of 59.5%: male literacy was 60%, and female literacy was 48%. 14% of the population was under 6 years of age.

== Transportation ==
=== Road ===
Harapanahalli is well connected by road, with several state highways passing through the city, including State Highway 2 (SH-2), State Highway 25 (SH-25), State Highway 47 (SH-47), and State Highway 150 (SH-150). State Highway 25 has been proposed for upgradation to a National Highway. The city is served by a Kalyana Karnataka Road Transport Corporation (KKRTC) bus depot, which operates under the Vijayanagara Division.

=== Rail ===
Harapanahalli railway station (station code: HPHI) is a railway station in Vijayanagara district, Karnataka, India. It is operated by the Mysuru railway division of the South Western Railway (SWR) zone. The station is located on the Harihar–Hosapete single-track broad-gauge railway line. Passenger and freight trains serve the station. A Final Location Survey (FLS) has been completed for the proposed Gadag Junction–Harapanahalli railway line via Mundargi and Huvina Hadagali. The Harihar–Hosapete railway line is undergoing electrification in phases.

=== Air ===
The nearest airport to Harapanahalli is Jindal Vijayanagara Airport (IATA: VDY), located at Toranagallu, approximately 95 km from the city. The airport operates scheduled commercial flights to destinations including Bengaluru and Hyderabad. Rashtrakavi Kuvempu Airport (IATA: RQY), located at Shivamogga, is approximately 126 km away and provides scheduled flights to Bengaluru, Chennai, Hyderabad, Goa (Mopa), and Tirupati. Hubballi Airport (IATA: HBX), situated about 152 km from Harapanahalli, offers flights to Bengaluru, Delhi, Hyderabad, Mumbai, and Pune. Kempegowda International Airport (IATA: BLR), located in Bengaluru approximately 302 km away, is the nearest international airport and provides extensive domestic and international air connectivity.

== Education ==
There are several private and government primary and high schools including (CBSE) syllabus with Pharmacy, PU, ITI and UG colleges.

== See also ==
- Neelagunda, Harapanahalli
- Chigateri
- Arasikere
- Teligi
- Hulikatti
