= Vijayanagara district =

District in Karnataka, India

- District of Karnataka
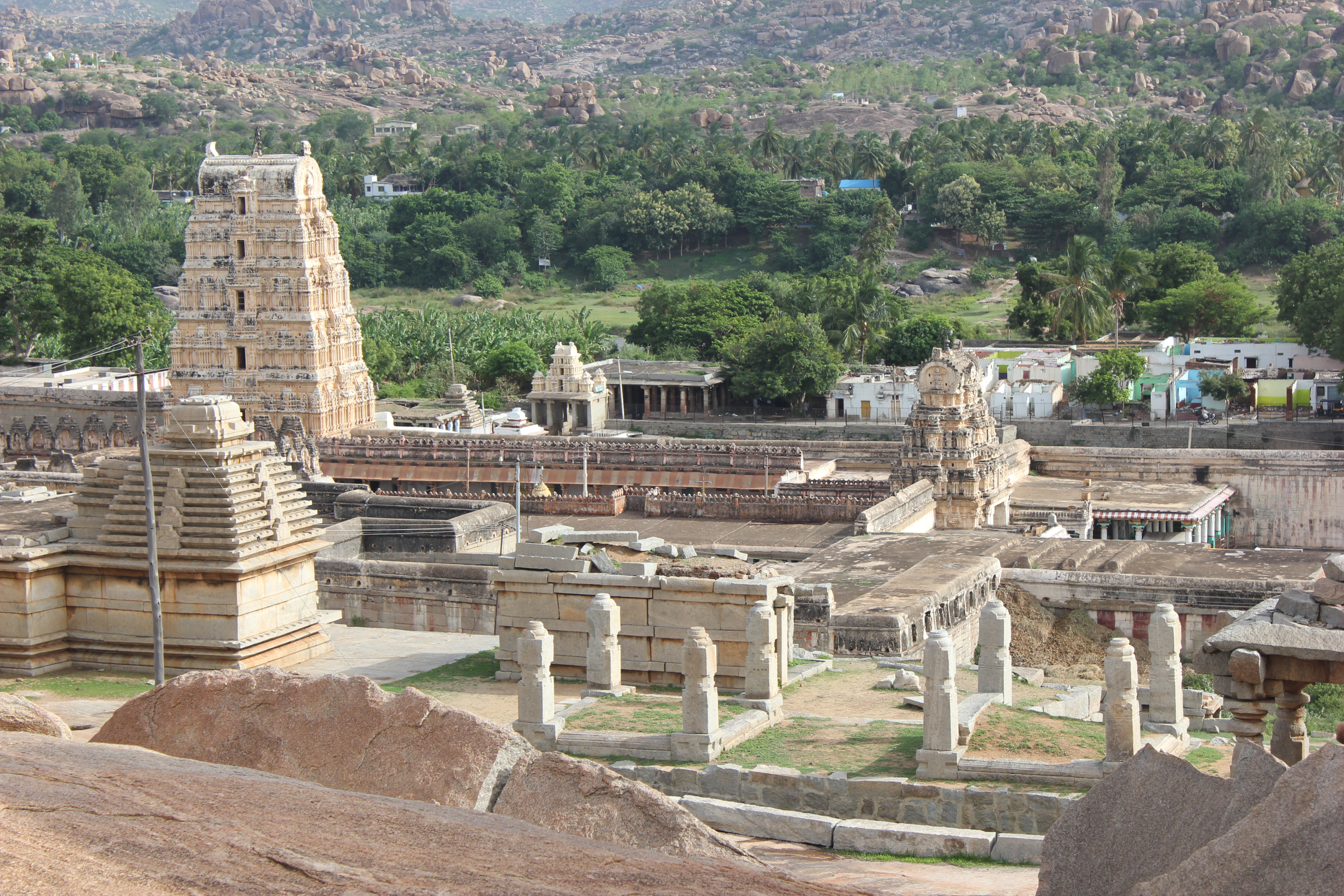
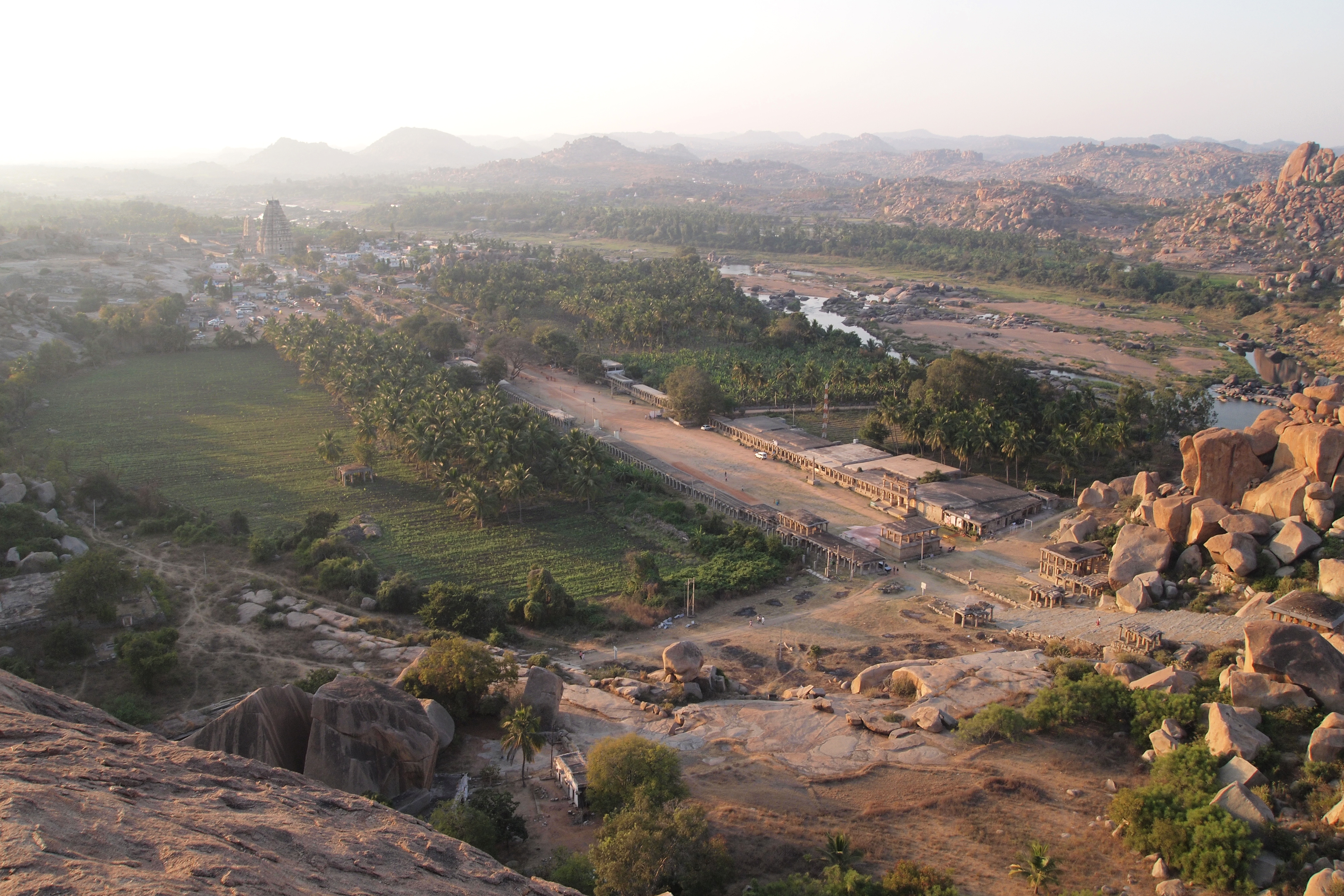
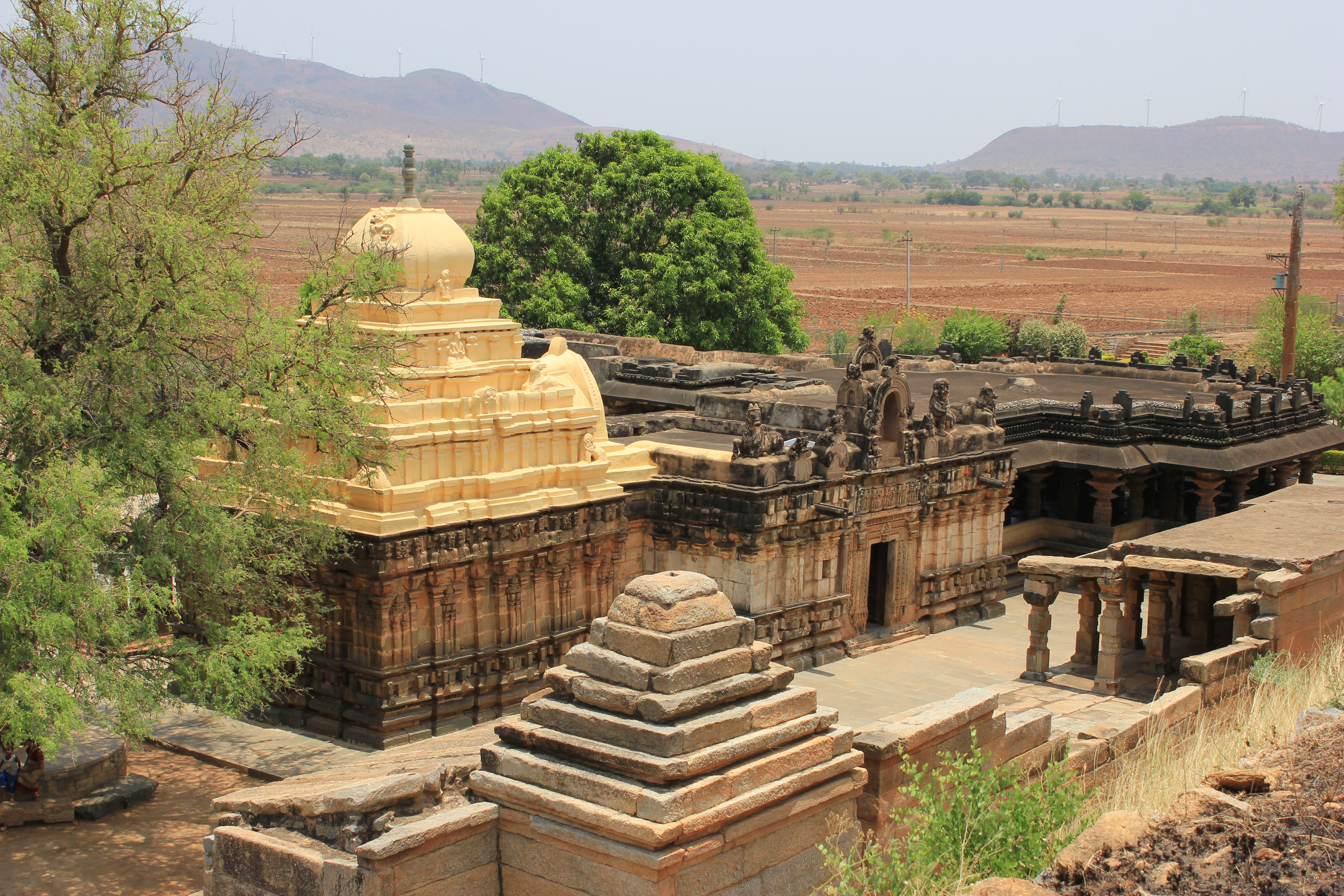
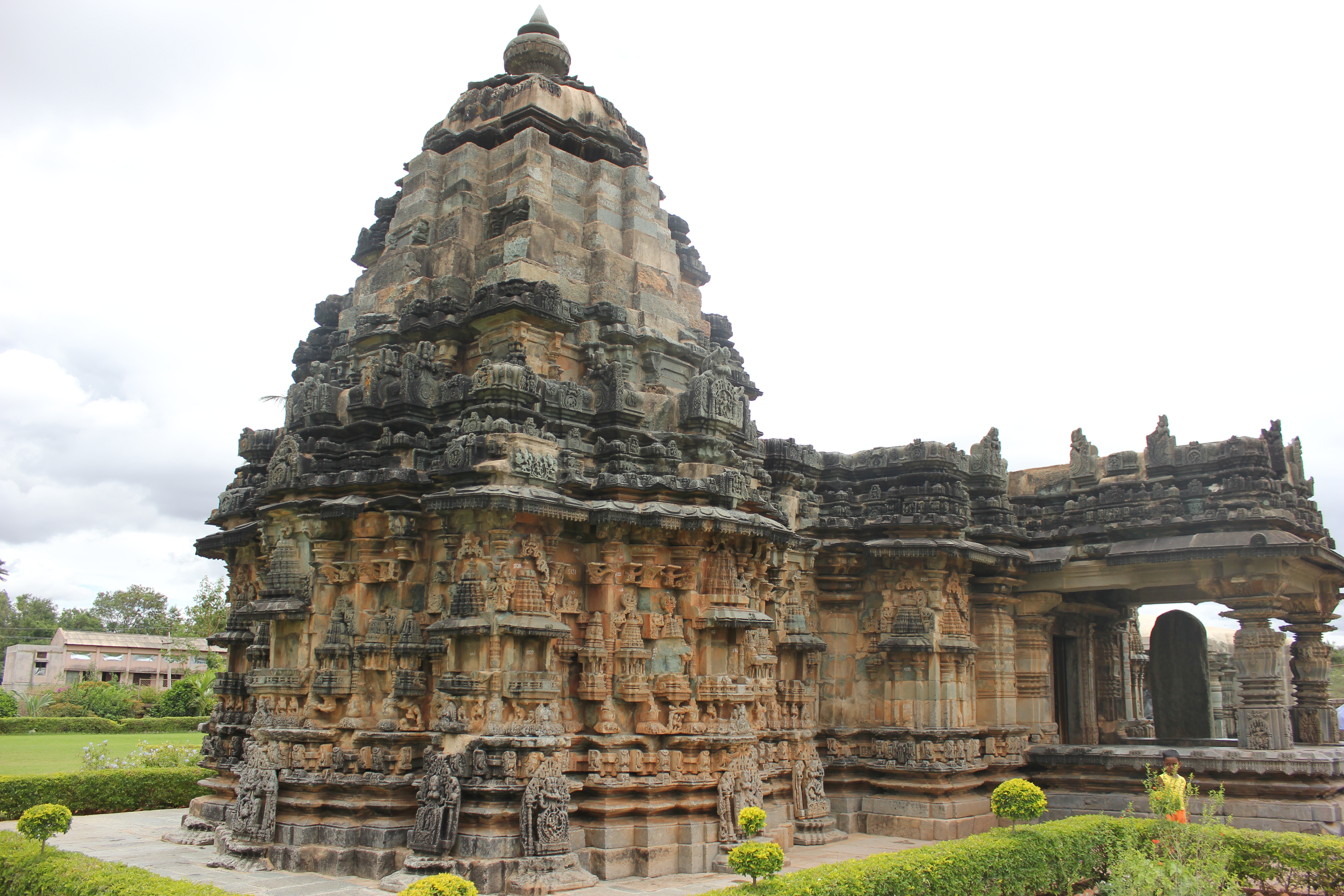
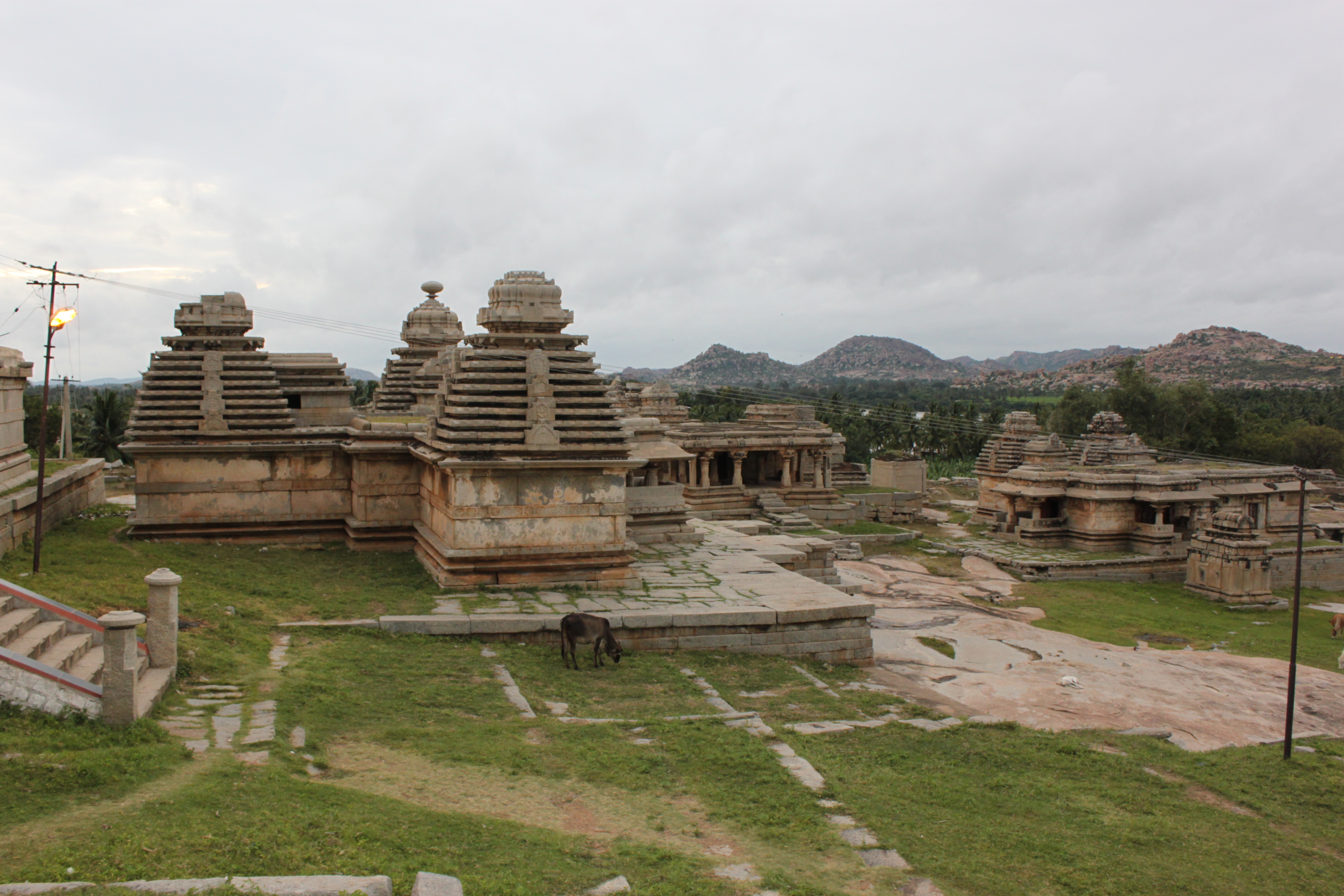
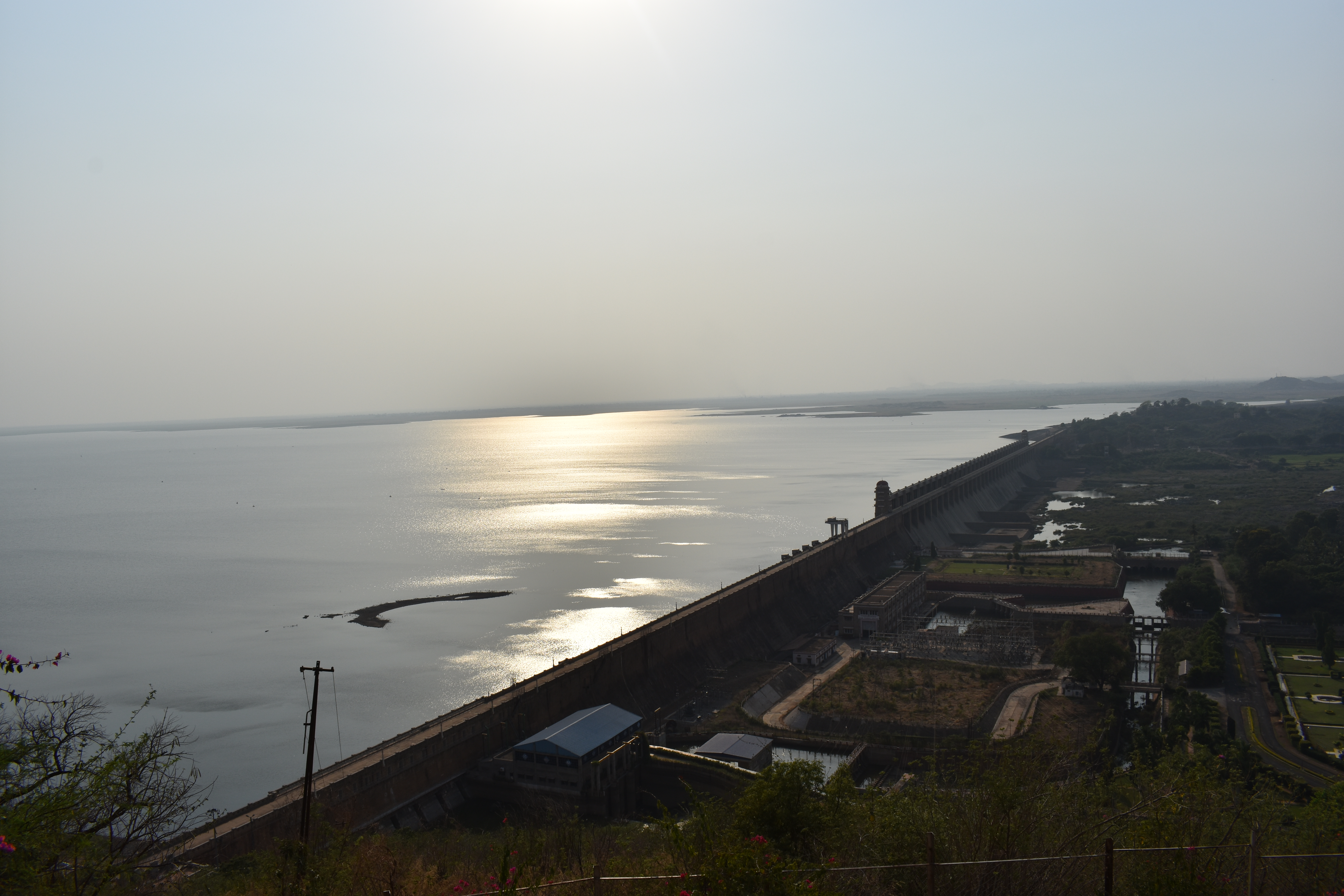
- Virupaksha Temple, Hampi Bazaar from Matanga Hill, Kalleshwara Temple Temple at Bagali, Temples on Hemakuta Hill, Tungabhadra Dam, Kalleshwara Temple at Hirehadagalli

- Location in Karnataka
- Country: India
- State: Karnataka
- Division: Kalaburagi
- Formation: 17 November 2021 (4 years ago)
- Named for: Vijayanagara Empire
- Headquarters: Hospet
- Taluks: Hospet; Harapanahalli; Kudligi; Hoovina Hadagali; Hagaribommanahalli; Kotturu

Government
  - Body: Vijayanagara Zilla Panchayat
  - Deputy Commissioner and District Magistrate: Kavitha S Mannikeri, IAS
  - Superintendent of Police: S Jahnavi, IPS
  - Chief Executive Officer: Sadashiva Prabhu B

Area
  - Total: 4,252 km^{2} (1,642 sq mi)
- Elevation: 449 m (1,473 ft)

Population (2011)
  - Total: 1,353,628
  - Density: 318.4/km^{2} (824.5/sq mi)

Language
  - Official: Kannada
- Time zone: UTC+5:30 (IST)
- Telephone code: Hospet 08394
- Vehicle registration: KA-35
- Website: vijayanagara.nic.in

Vijayanagara District is a district in the southern Indian state of Karnataka, located in the Kalyana-Karnataka region.

Vijayanagara was officially carved out of Ballari on 17 November 2021 to become the 31st district of the state with Hospet as the district headquarters. It is home to Hampi, the former capital of the famous Vijayanagara Empire and a UNESCO World Heritage site, and several historical places are located in the district.

== History ==
During late-medieval India, the region comprising present-day Vijayanagara District was the seat of the Vijayanagara Empire. During British Rule, it was part of Madras presidency. After India's independence, during the organisation of Indian states in the Republic of India, with the formation Andhra Pradesh in 1953, the Vijayanagara region was part of Bellary district of the newly formed Mysore state. In 2020, six divisions were planned to be split up from Bellary and form out of them a new district. During the 2020 premiership of B. S. Yediyurappa, the government of Karnataka approved the plan and notified the formation of Vijayanagara District on 18 November 2020, thus making it the 31st district of Karnataka in 2021.

At present, Vijayanagara District is part of the Kalyana Karnataka region.

== Demographics ==
According to the 2011 census, the area that is now Vijayangara District has a population of 1,353,628, of which 359,694 (26.57%) live in urban areas. Vijayanagara District has a sex ratio of 976 females per 1000 males. Scheduled Castes and Scheduled Tribes make up 322,603 (23.83%) and 235,724 (17.41%) of the population respectively.

Religion in Vijayanagara district (2011)
Hinduism	88.75%
Islam	10.41%
Other or not stated	0.56%

Languages of Vijayanagara district (2011)
1. Kannada (78.1%)
2. Urdu (9.37%)
3. Lambadi (5.82%)
4. Telugu (3.97%)
5. Tamil (1.07%)
6. Others (1.68%)

At the time of the 2011 census, 78.09% of the population spoke Kannada, 9.37% Urdu, 5.82% Lambadi, 3.97% Telugu and 1.07% Tamil as their first language.

== Government and politics ==
=== Administration ===
Vijayanagara District comprises six divisions, two subdivisions, and 18 village clusters. Hospet is the administrative headquarters of the district.

Zameer Ahmad Khan, MLA from Chamarajpete, was appointed as the district's minister in charge for the state government. Krishna Nayaka is the current MLA of Hoovina Hadagali, P. T. Parameshwar Naik, a former minister and MLA from Hoovina Hadagali and M. P. Prakash, former Deputy Chief Minister of Karnataka.

=== Parliament and assembly seats ===
In the national legislature's lower house, Vijayanagara District is part of Bellary Constituency (reserved for scheduled tribes), except for Harapanahalli, which is part of Davanagere Constituency.

In state legislature's lower house, Vijayanagara District has five assembly seats: Harapanahalli; Hagaribommanahalli (scheduled castes); Vijayanagara; Kudligi (scheduled tribes); and Hoovina Hadagali (scheduled castes).

== Tourism ==
- Tungabhadra Dam, in Hospet, over Tungabhadra River
- Hampi: known for the ruins of Vijayanagara. A world heritage site, which attracts hundreds of thousands of people from across the world every year, is situated in this district. It is home to several ruined structures.
- Mylara: Mylara Lingeshwara Temple is a Hindu temple dedicated to God Mylara, who is believed to be a form of Lord Krishna. Located at the centre of Karnataka, it is in the extreme south-western corner of Hoovina Hadagali, of Vijayanagara District.
- Tungabhadra River, viewing Point.
- Makanadaku A remote village located in the Kudligi taluk hosts for Kanchobaleshwara Temple a unique Ugra Narasimha who was presiding deity for various palegar during Vijayanagar empire It's Magnificent temple attracts everyone by Vijayanagara temple style Gopurams
- Kotturu: Sri Guru Kotturubasaveshwara Temple is a Hindu temple dedicated to God Sri Guru Basaveshwara. Located at the town of Kotturu, of Vijayanagara District.
- Bagali, Harapanahalli: Bagali Basaveshwara is a Hindu temple from ancient times. It is a very attractive place. Located near SH-25, Hospet Main Road, 8 km away from Harapanahalli City of Vijayanagara District.
- Koolahalli, Harapanahalli: Koolahalli Basaveshwara
- Neelagunda, Harapanahall

== Education ==
Kannada University, a research-oriented public university, is situated in Hampi. The university was founded by the government of Karnataka during the premiership of S. Bangarappa with the aim to develop the Kannada language and to promote its literature and traditions.
