= Honnihal =

Honnihal or Honnihalli may refer to:

- Honnihal, Bagankot, a village in Bilagi Talaku, Bagalkot District, Karnataka, India
- Honnihal, Belgaum, a village in Belgaum Talaku, Belgaum District, Karnataka, India
- Honnihalli, a village in Hukeri Talaku, Belgaum District, Karnataka, India

== See also ==
- Hire Honnihalli, Hirehonnihalli, a village in Kalghatgi Taluka, Dharwad District, Karnataka, India
- Madki Honnihalli, Madkihonnihalli, a village in Kalghatgi Taluka, Dharwad District, Karnataka, India
- Tabakad Honnihalli, Tabakadhonnihalli, a village in Kalghatgi Taluka, Dharwad District, Karnataka, India
