= Mukkall =

- Village
- Location in Karnataka, India
- Coordinates: 15.21°N 74.94°E
- Country: India
- State: Karnataka
- District: Dharwad
- Elevation: 536 m (1,759 ft)

Population (2011)
  - Total: 2,764

Languages
  - Official: Kannada
- Time zone: UTC+5:30 (IST)
- PIN: 581204
- Vehicle registration: KA-25

Mukkall village is located in Kalghatgi Tehsil of Dharwad district in Karnataka, India. It is situated at a distance of 10 km from sub-district headquarter Kalghatgi, 43 km away from district headquarter Dharwad and 428 km from state capital Bangalore. Mukkal is the gram panchayat of Mukkall village. The post office closest to Mukkall is at Kalghatgi. It falls under Kalghatgi assembly constituency and as per Lok Sabha it falls under Dharwad constituency.

The total geographical area of village is 1220.51 hectares with a total population of 2,674 and the village has 579 houses. Kalghatgi is the nearest town to Mukkall which is approximately 10 km away.

Nearby villages of Mukkall are enlisted below along with approximate distances between them:

1. Beeravalli (5 km)
2. Tavargeri (5 km)
3. Bammigatti (7 km)
4. Madakihonnahalli (9 km)
5. Kalghatgi (10 km)

== Demographics ==
As of the 2011 Census of India there were 579 households in Mukkall and a total population of 2,674 consisting of 1,383 males and 1,291 females. There were 300 children ages 0-6.
