= Gundolli =

- Village
- Country: India
- State: Karnataka
- District: Belgaum
- Talukas: Khanapur

Languages
  - Official: Kannada
- Time zone: UTC+5:30 (IST)

Gundolli is a village in Belgaum district in the southern state of Karnataka, India. As of 2012, the town was financially and logistically dependent on the town of Alnavar, which was a severe problem for residents of the village as the only connection between them and Alnavar was a poorly maintained mud road. The village lies on the border between Belgaum district and neighbouring Dharwad district, a location which has been blamed for the poor services in the village as neither of the district governments are interested in providing services to the village.
