= Morab, India =

Morab
- Village
- Location in Karnataka, India Morab (India)
- Coordinates: 15°35′N 75°10′E
- Country: India
- State: Karnataka
- District: Dharwad
- Talukas: Navalgund

Government
  - Type: Panchayati raj (India)
  - Body: Gram panchayat

Languages
  - Official: Kannada
- Time zone: UTC+5:30 (IST)
- Postal code: 580112

Morab, India is a village in Dharwad district of Karnataka, India. It is the biggest village in Navalgund taluk. Village is well connected to Hubli, Dharwad and Navalgund.
