= Kondikoppa =

- village
- Location in Karnataka, India Kondikoppa (India)
- Coordinates: 15.44751°N 75.44436°E
- Country: India
- State: Karnataka
- District: Dharwad
- Talukas: Navalgund

Government
  - Type: Panchayat raj
  - Body: Gram panchayat

Population (2011)
  - Total: 1,588

Languages
  - Official: Kannada
- Time zone: UTC+5:30 (IST)
- PIN: 582201
- ISO 3166 code: IN-KA
- Vehicle registration: KA
- Nearest city: Dharwad
- Website: karnataka.gov.in

Kondikoppa is a village in the southern state of Karnataka, India. It is located in the Navalgund taluk of Dharwad district.

== Demographics ==
As of the 2011 Census of India, there were 368 households in Kondikoppa and a total population of 1,588 consisting of 788 males and 800 females. There were 170 children ages 0-6.

== See also ==
- Dharwad
- Districts of Karnataka
