= Ahetti =

- Village
- Location in Karnataka, India Ahetti (India)
- Coordinates: 15°35′48″N 75°06′12″E
- Country: India
- State: Karnataka
- District: Dharwad
- Talukas: Navalgund

Government
  - Type: Panchayat raj
  - Body: Gram panchayat

Population (2011)
  - Total: 2,439

Languages
  - Official: Kannada
- Time zone: UTC+5:30 (IST)
- ISO 3166 code: IN-KA
- Vehicle registration: KA
- Nearest city: Dharwad
- Civic agency: Village Panchayat
- Website: karnataka.gov.in

Ahetti is a village in the southern state of Karnataka, India. It is located in the Navalgund taluk of Dharwad district in Karnataka.

== Demographics ==
As of the 2011 Census of India there were 446 households in Ahetti and a total population of 2,439 consisting of 1,249 males and 1,190 females. There were 285 children ages 0-6.

== See also ==
- Dharwad
- Districts of Karnataka
