= Tirlapur =

- Village
- Country: India
- State: Karnataka
- District: Dharwad
- Talukas: Navalgund

Government
  - Type: Panchayat raj
  - Body: Gram panchayat

Population (2011)
  - Total: 5,585

Languages
  - Official: Kannada
- Time zone: UTC+5:30 (IST)
- ISO 3166 code: IN-KA
- Vehicle registration: KA
- Website: karnataka.gov.in

Tirlapur is a village in the southern state of Karnataka, India. It is located in the Navalgund taluk of Dharwad district in Karnataka.

== Demographics ==
As of the 2011 Census of India there were 1,125 households in Tirlapur and a total population of 5,585 consisting of 2,873 males and 2,712 females. There were 679 children ages 0-6.

== See also ==
- Dharwad
- Districts of Karnataka
