= Mishrikoti =

- village
- Location in Karnataka, India Mishrikoti (India)
- Coordinates: 15.2465°N 75.0567°E
- Country: India
- State: Karnataka
- District: Dharwad
- Talukas: Kalghatgi

Government
  - Type: Panchayat raj
  - Body: Gram panchayat

Population (2011)
  - Total: 9,006

Languages
  - Official: Kannada
- Time zone: UTC+5:30 (IST)
- PIN: 581 204
- ISO 3166 code: IN-KA
- Vehicle registration: KA
- Nearest city: hubli
- Climate: hot (Köppen)
- Website: karnataka.gov.in

Mishrikoti is a village in the southern state of Karnataka, India. It is located in the Kalghatgi taluk of Dharwad district in Karnataka.

== Demographics ==
As of the 2011 Census of India there were 1,932 households in Mishrikoti and a total population of 9,006 consisting of 4,646 males and 4,360 females. There were 1,113 children ages 0-6.

== See also ==
- Dharwad
- Districts of Karnataka
