= Sangameshwara, Kalaghatagi =

Village in Karnataka, India

Sangameshwara
- Village
- Location within Karnataka Location within India
- Coordinates: 15°11′19″N 74°59′7″E
- Country: India
- State: Karnataka
- District: Dharwad district
- Taluk: Kalaghatagi
- First settled: Prior to 11th century

Population (2001)
  - Total: 1,953

Languages
  - Official: Kannada
- Time zone: UTC+5:30 (IST)
- PIN: 581 204
- Telephone code: 08370
- Vehicle registration: KA 25

Sangameshwara is a village in the Kalaghatagi taluk of Dharwad district in the Indian state of Karnataka. Sangameshwara is located 10 km west to Kalaghatagi town.

== Demographics ==
As of 2001 India census, Sangameshwara had a population of 1,953 with 1,011 males and 942 females and 321 Households.

== Importance ==
Sangemeshwara is famous for the 11th century Kalmeshara Temple.

== See also ==
- Kalaghatagi
- Dharwad
