= Tamboor =

Town in Kalghatgi, Karnataka, India

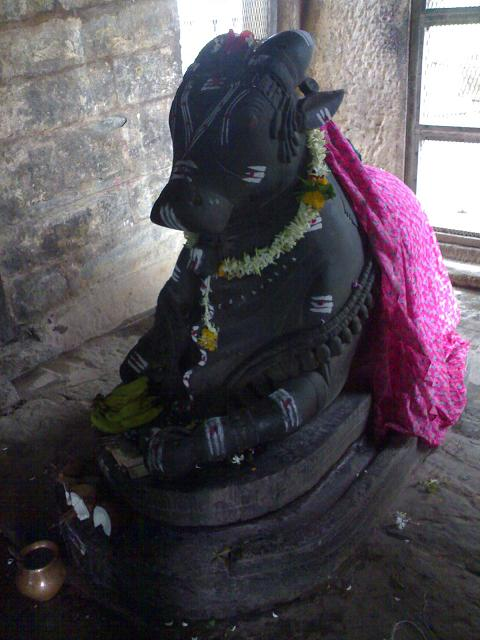
Tamboor Basavanna temple, 11 km from Kalghatgi, Karnataka

Tamboor is a town in Kalghatgi Taluk, Dharwad District in Karnataka, India. It is about 8 km from Kalghatagi and about 11 km from Kalghatgi (via Devikoppa) NH 63, 3 km from main road in Karnataka state, India.

== Name ==
Tamboor name came to village due to the huge availability of copper in earlier years. "Tamra nagar" converted to tamroor and tamboor.

== Geography ==
Tamboor is located at Western Ghats. Thick forests here hold tigers, chital, elephant, sarang, cobra, and other wildlife.

Other local areas of interest include Tamboor Lake, Satoo Shahid Durga, Kali River, Anashi Reserve Forest, Supa Dam.

== Transport ==
It is better to travel in one's own vehicle. Three daily buses and tempose traveling via Devikoppa from Kalghatgi, Hubli, Dharwad and Yellapur. Nearest places: Kalghatgi, Dharwad, Hubli and Yellapur.

== Basavanna temple ==
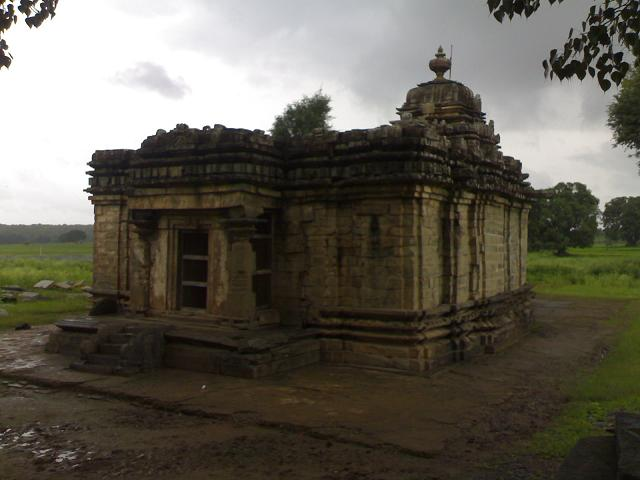
Tamboor Basavanna temple, 11 km from Kalghatgi, Karnataka

Tamboor is an important center of pilgrimage for people of the Lingayat faith. The Temple of Basavanna, one of the most revered saints of the Lingayat faith lies here. In the 12th century, the Chalukya and Ganga dynasties ruled there. The Tamboor jathre or congregations attracts pilgrims from all over Karnataka as one of the major community or `panchamsali lingayaths' are large number devoted here visiting regularly.

Tamboor (Tambur) Basavanna temple is situated 11 km from Kalghatgi, at the end of Devikoppa Forest.

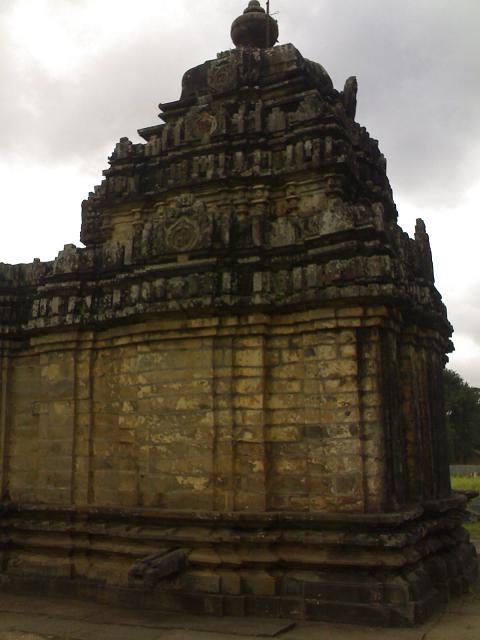
Tamboor Basavanna temple, 11 km from Kalghatagi, Karnataka

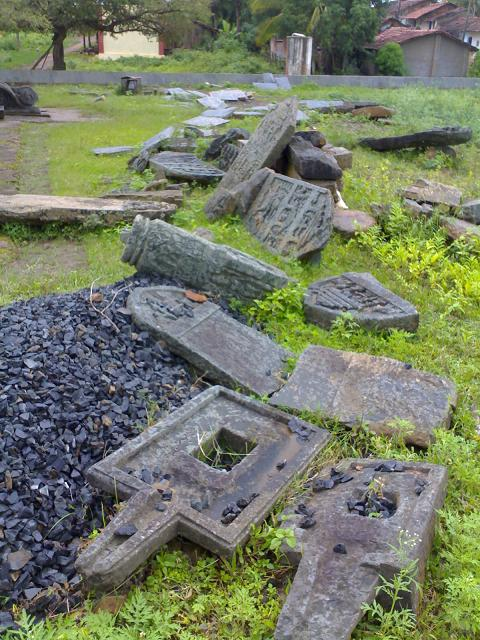
Inscriptions and her stones at Tamboor Basavanna temple, 11 km from Kalghatagi, Karnataka

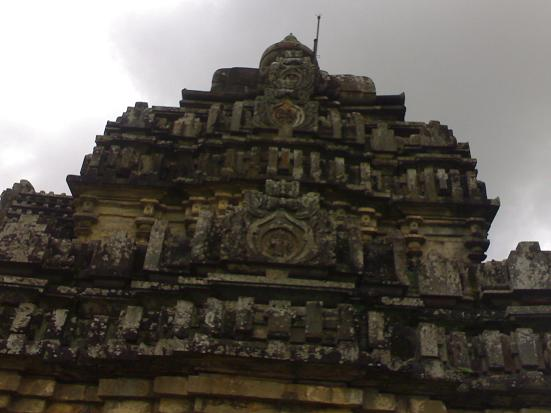
Tamboor Basavanna temple, 11 km from Kalghatgi, Karnataka
