= Alnavar =

- Town
- Location in Karnataka, India
- Coordinates: 15.43°N 74.73°E
- Country: India
- State: Karnataka
- District: Dharwad
- Elevation: 563 m (1,847 ft)

Population (2023)
  - Total: 23,498
- Time zone: UTC+5:30 (IST)
- Postal code: 581103
- Vehicle registration: KA25

Alnavar is a panchayat town and taluk in the Dharwad district in Karnataka, India.

== Geography ==
Alnavar is located at 15.43°N 74.73°E. It has an average elevation of 563 metres (1847 feet).

== Demographics ==
As of 2001 India census, Alnavar had a population of 16,286. Males constitute 51% of the population and females constitute 49%. Alnavar has an average literacy rate of 67%, higher than the national average of 59.5%, with 56% of the males and 44% of females literate. 13% of the population is under 6 years of age.
