= Honnihalli =

Village in Belagavi, Karnataka

Coordinates: 15°14′N 75°00′E

- Village
- Honnihalli Water Barrier
- Interactive map of Honnihalli
- Country: India
- State: Karnataka
- District: Belagavi
- Talukas: Hukeri

Languages
  - Official: Kannada
- Time zone: UTC+5:30 (IST)
- PIN: 591225
- Telephone code: +91 8333
- Nearest city: Sankeshwar

Honnihalli is a village in Belagavi district in the southern state of Karnataka, India.

According to Census 2011 information the location code or village code of Honnihalli village is 591225. Honnihalli village is located in Hukkeri Tehsil of Belagavi district in Karnataka, India. It is situated 24km away from sub-district headquarter Hukkeri and 60km away from district headquarter Belagavi. Kannada is the common language of Honnihalli.

== Population ==
Honnihalli has a total population of 1,695 people with 843 male and 852 female population respectively. There are about 355 houses in Honnihalli village. Sankeshwar is nearest town to Honnihalli which is approximately 07km away.

The total geographical area of the village is 395.86 hectares.

=== Distance ===
50 km from Belgaum
45 km from Kolhapur
130 km from Goa Velha
290 km from Pune

== Places to visit ==
Amboli is the nearest Hill station from Honnihalli, 70 km away. Ramlinga Teerthkshetra is a famous historical Place, 10 km away.

Hidkal dam is also known as Raja Lakhamgouda dam. This dam is constructed across the Ghataprabha River, with the Basin of the Krishna River. The dam is about 40 km from Honnihalli and is near to the Pune-Bangalore national highway No 4.

Gokak falls is located in Gokak town, 6 km away from the town centre and 45 km away from Honnihalli.
