= Honnihal, Belgaum =

Honnihal
- Village
- Country: India
- State: Karnataka
- District: Belgaum
- Talukas: Belgaum

Languages
  - Official: Kannada
- Time zone: UTC+5:30 (IST)

Honnihal is a village in Belgaum district in the southern state of Karnataka, India.
