= Panchamsali Lingayats =

Panchamasali Lingayats
ಪಂಚಮಸಾಲಿ ಲಿಂಗಾಯತರು

Total population
- 90 Lakhs

Regions with significant populations
- Karnataka, Maharashtra, Andhra Pradesh

Languages
- Kannada, Marathi, Telugu

Religion
- Hinduism

Related ethnic groups
- Lingayats

Panchamasali Lingayats (Kannada: ಪಂಚಮಸಾಲಿ ಲಿಂಗಾಯತರು) are a prominent agricultural community in Karnataka, traditionally associated with farming. one of the largest sub-sects of the Lingayat community in southern India. They form a significant part of the Lingayat tradition that emerged in the 12th century under the social reformer Basavanna. Traditionally, the Panchamasali Lingayats are the largest sub-sect of the Lingayat community, making up around 60–70% of its population.

They are predominantly concentrated in northern and central Karnataka and have historically played a significant role in the social and political landscape of the state.

== History ==
The Panchamasalis were historically an agrarian community earlier known as kodagai/kudu Vokaligas (due to their major contribution in charity and philanthropy) and are associated with Shri Sonalagi Siddheshwar in deccan pennensular region, primarily engaged in cultivation and major land holding. Before the rise of Lingayatism in the 12th century, they are recorded as being an important agricultural backbone of the Jain kingdoms of Karnataka serving as key providers of food and agricultural produce to rulers, kingdoms, and institutions, as well as to the wider population. Several historians note that the Panchamsali community historically served as farmers and also as warrior-farmers under Jain-ruled kingdoms. Before the 12th century, much of North Karnataka, Andhra, and Maharashtra was ruled by the Rashtrakutas who were themselves followers and patrons of Jainism. Similarly, the Bunts in coastal Karnataka are described as warrior groups who served under the Hoysalas.

Before the 12th century, the Panchamsalis were primarily an agricultural community. There are no clear historical records that show which religion the Panchamsali's followed before the 12th century, But With the growth of the Bhakti movement and the reformist teachings of Basavanna, they gradually embraced Lingayatism, and They are regarded as the first community to have embraced Lingayatism along with Jangama's, in the 12th century. Later around 17th century, the Banajigas Community who were originally Jain's engaged in trade and historically recorded as Jain Merchants, gradually converted to Lingayatism around the 16th-17th centuries. This was followed by the Sadar Lingayats, a landlord Community, who were also Originally Jains and converted in the 19th century they were still recorded as Jains in the 1901 Census. These two wealthy sub-sects joined the Panchamsalis and Jangamas in supporting Lingayatism. and Traditionally, these newer Banajiga and Sadar lingayats sub-sects contributed significantly to the building of Lingayat mathas, monasteries, Temples and educational institutions for the Lingayat community. panchamsalis while continuing their agrarian role in society. Over time, they consolidated as one of the largest Lingayat sub-sects, contributing to the spread of Lingayatism in the Deccan region.

== Demographics ==
Panchamasalis are one of the most populous Lingayat subgroups, especially concentrated in Northern Karnataka districts such as Belagavi, Bagalkot, Dharwad, Gadag, and Haveri. They are also found in parts of Maharashtra and Andhra Pradesh.

== Religious practices ==
Like other Lingayat groups, Panchamasalis follow the teachings of Basavanna and the Virashaiva saints. They worship Ishtalinga and participate in Lingayat rituals, often guided by Jangam priests.

== Contemporary issues ==
In modern Karnataka, Panchamasalis are active in political and social movements, often seeking greater representation in government and access to educational benefits. The community has also contributed to the development of Lingayat religious and educational institutions.

== See also ==
• Jangam

• Banajiga

• Sadar Lingayats

== Bibliography ==
- Ishwaran, Karigoudar (1983). Religion and Society among the Lingayats of South India. Leiden: Brill. ISBN 978-90-04-06919-0.
- Patil, S. H. (2002). Community Dominance and Political Modernisation: The Lingayats. New Delhi: Mittal Publications. ISBN 978-81-7099-867-9.
