= Kalaghatagi =

- Town/Taluka
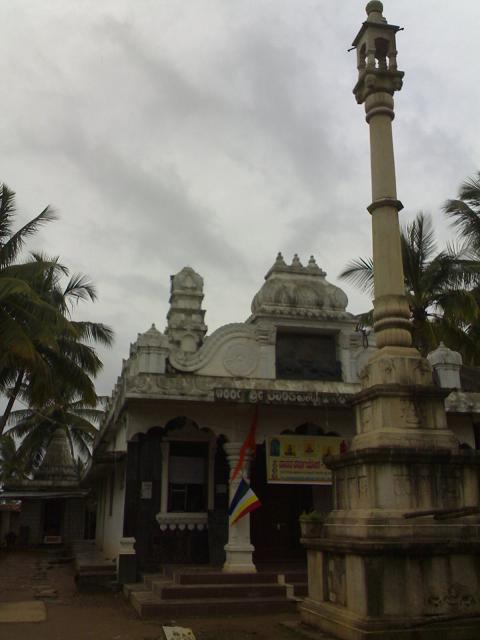
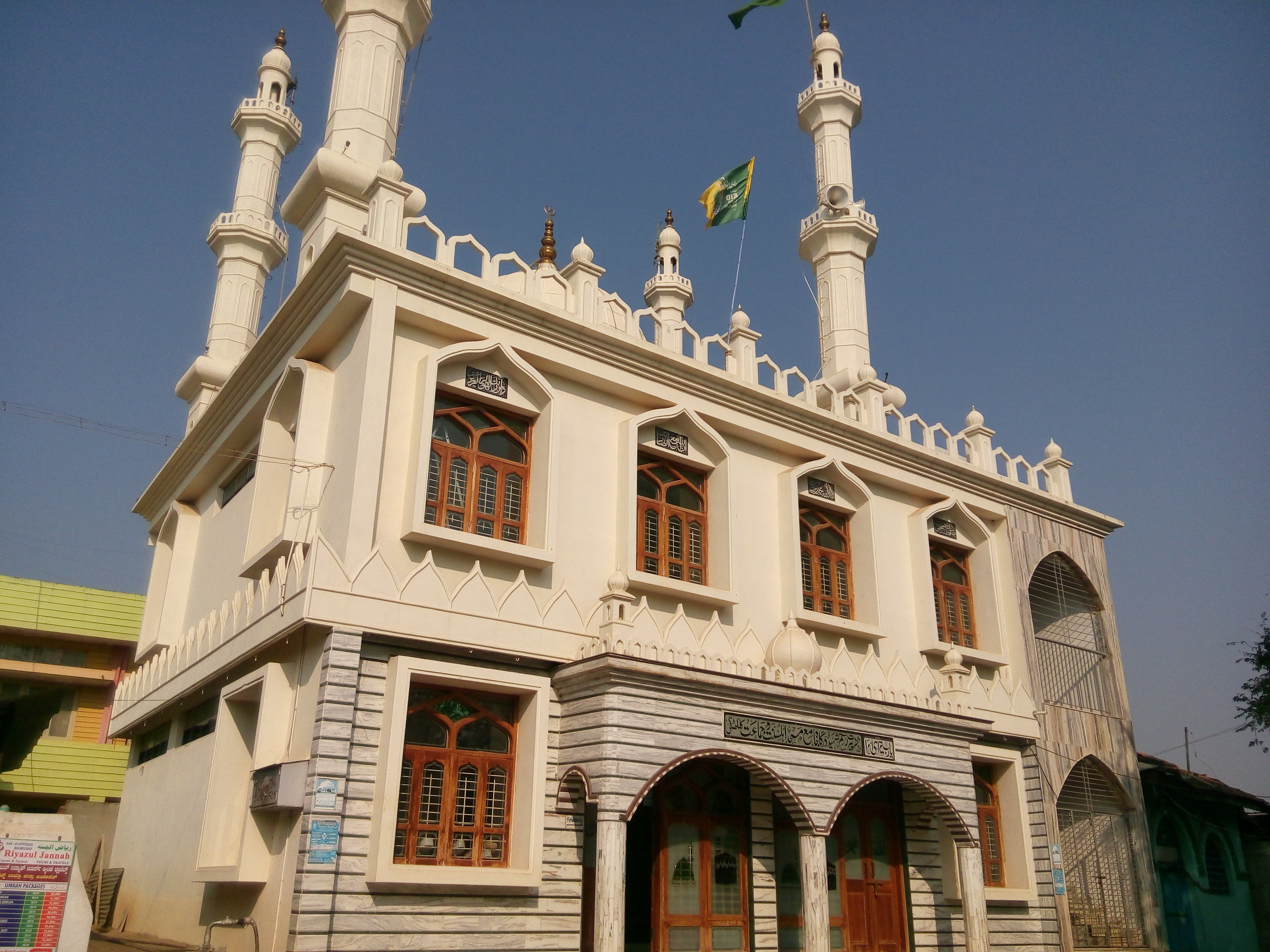
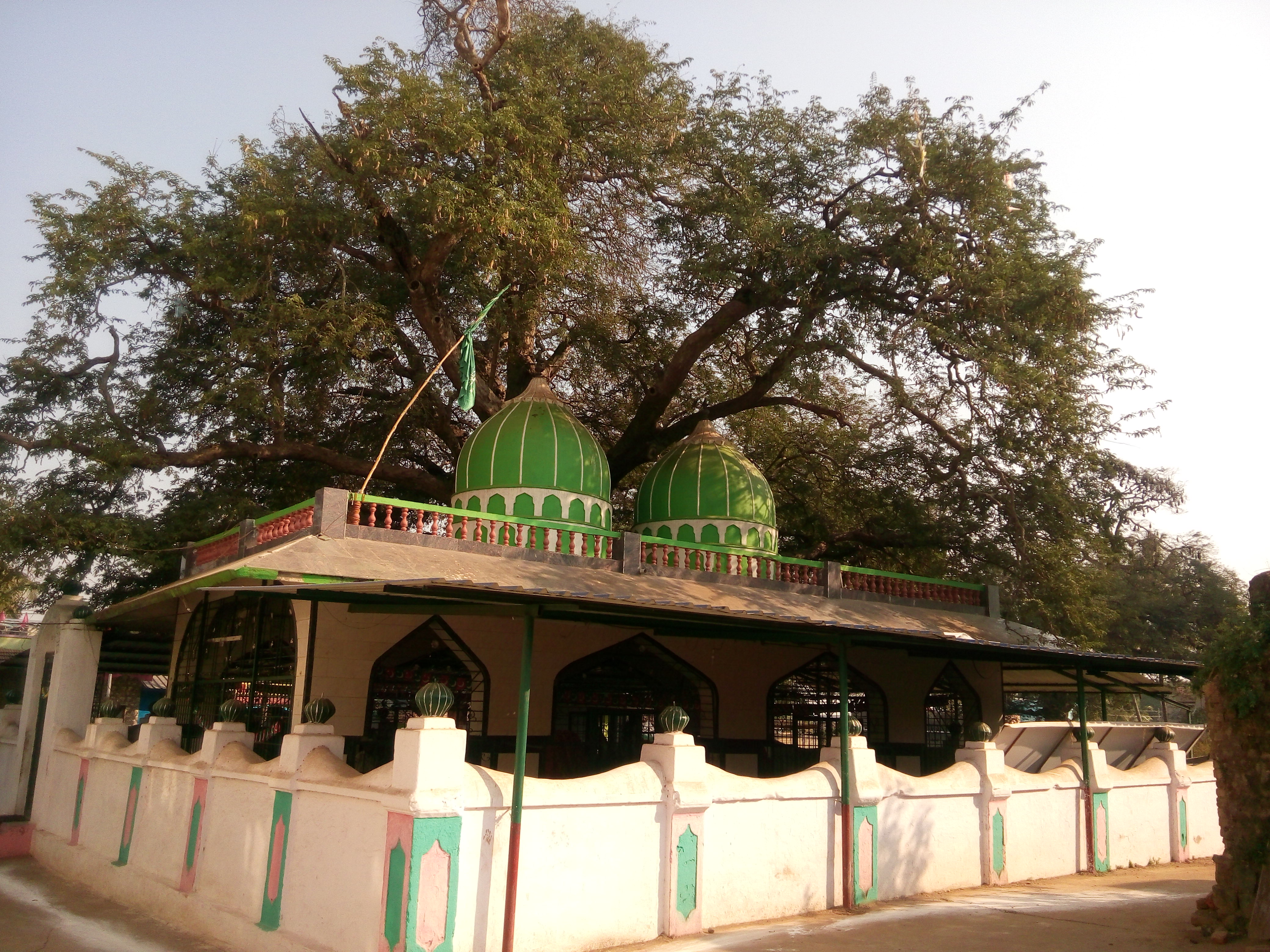
- Nickname: Kalagh
- Location in Karnataka, India
- Coordinates: 15.18°N 74.97°E
- Country: India
- State: Karnataka
- District: Dharwad
- Region: Malenadu/Bayaluseeme
- Elevation: 536 m (1,759 ft)

Population (2001)
  - Total: 14,676

Languages
  - Official: Kannada
- Time zone: UTC+5:30 (IST)
- PIN: 581204
- Vehicle registration: KA-25, KA-63
- Website: http://www.kalaghatagitown.gov.in/

Kalaghatagi (also known as Kalghatgi) is an administrative division, or Taluka, in the Dharwad district of the Indian state of Karnataka.

== Tourism ==
=== Kalaghatagi ===
Gram Devi Jatra, an ancient Taluk in the Dharwad District, is a village in Kalaghatagi. Rustoom Sab Keri, Rustoom Shaheed Darga, and Benachi Keri supplied drinking water for Kalaghatagi.

Other sizeable villages in Kalaghatagi are Misrikoti and Galagi, both well known for their large ponds.

=== Surashettikoppa ===
Surashettikoppa is a village in Kalaghataghi where Shree Brahmalingeshwar God jatra is held. This is well known in the Karnataka region.

=== Kalghatagi Mahalakshmi Temple & Durgas ===
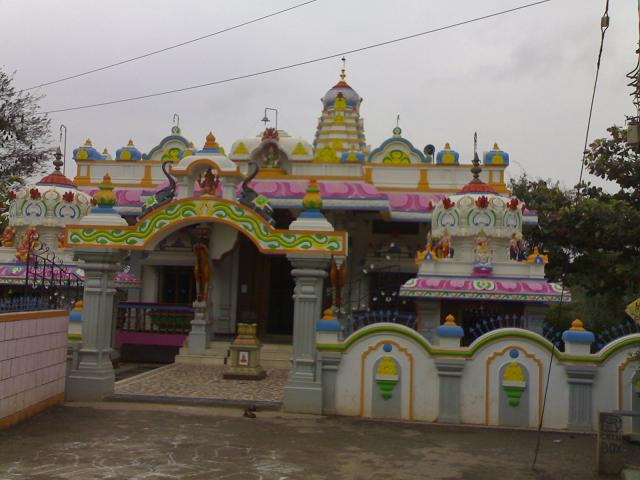

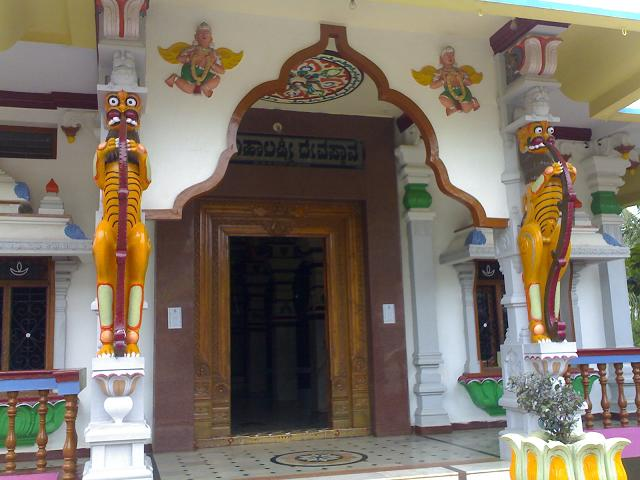

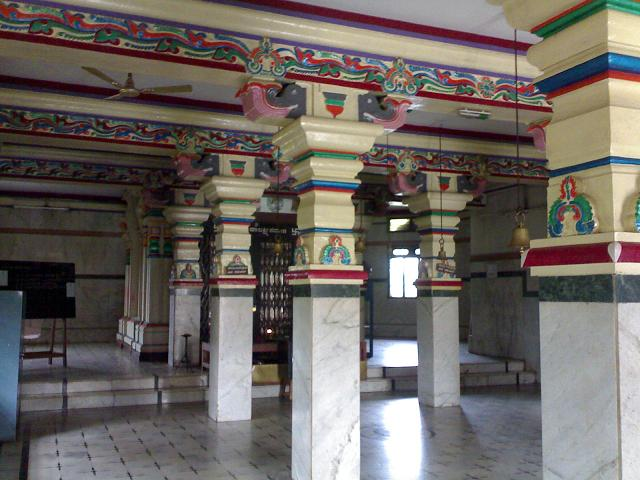

=== Shantinatha Basadi ===
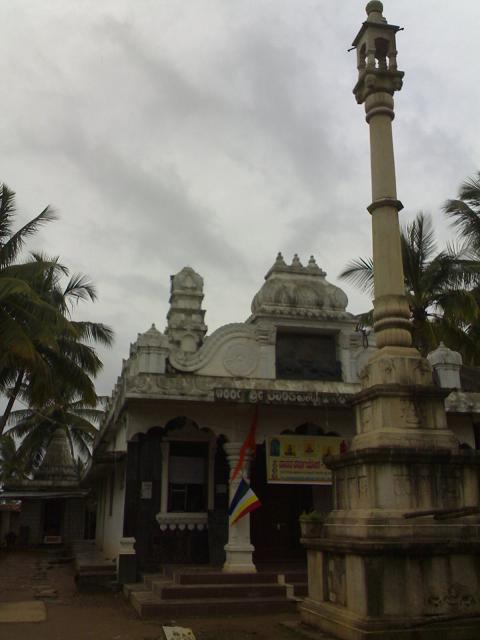
Shantinatha Basadi Jain temple

Beeravalli is an old village in Kalaghatagi. Kalameshwar Jatre is another famous place in Kalaghatagi.

=== Tamboor ===
Tamboor Basavanna Temple lies 11 km from Kalghatagi.

Tamboor is in Kalghatgi Taluk, Dharwad District in North Karnataka, India. It is about 8 km from Kalghatagi. Tamboor is a town about 11 km from Kalghatgi (via Devikoppa) NH 63, 3 km away from the main road in Karnataka state, India. The village received its name from the availability there of large amounts of copper in earlier years. "Tamra nagar" converted to tamroor and tamboor. Tamboor is located at Western Ghats, whose foliage density makes it a habitat for a few wild species like Tigers, Cheetahs, Elephants, Sarangs, Cobras, and many other wildlife. Transport: better to travel in one's own vehicle. Three daily buses and tempose traveling via Devikoppa from Kalghatgi, Hubli, Dharwad and Yellapur. Nearest places: Kalghatgi, Dharwad, Hubli and Yellapur. Other local areas of interest include Tamboor Lake, Satoo Shahid Durga, Kali River, Anashi Reserve Forest, and Supa Dam.

Tamboor is an important center of pilgrimage for people of the Lingayat faith. The Temple of Basavanna, who is one of the most revered saints of the Lingayat faith, lies here. In the 12th century, the Chalukyas and Gangas ruled there. The Tamboor jathre or congregations attracts pilgrims from all over Karnataka. As one of the major community or panchamsali lingayaths there are a large number of devotees visiting here regularly. Basavanna temple is situated 11 km from Kalghatgi, at the end of Devikoppa Forest.

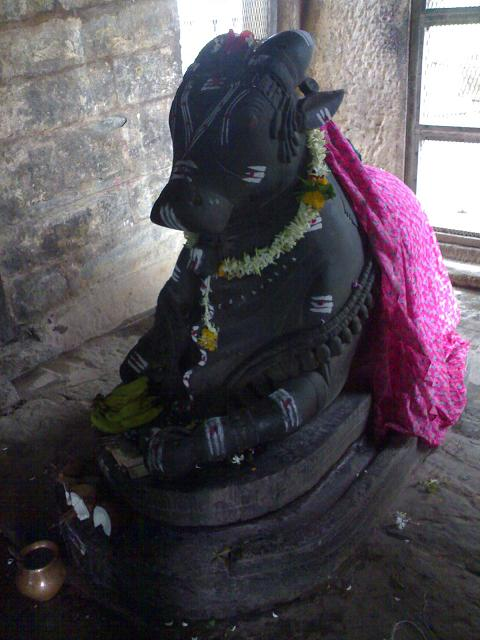

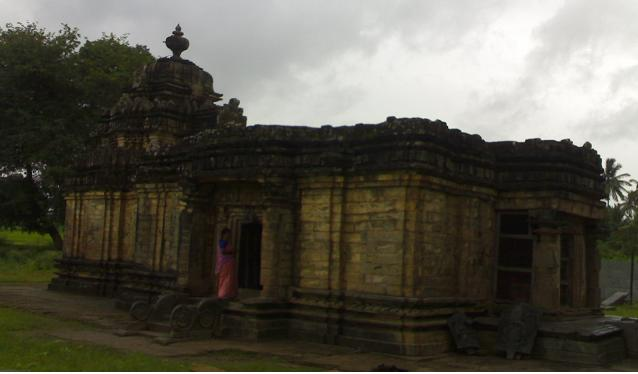

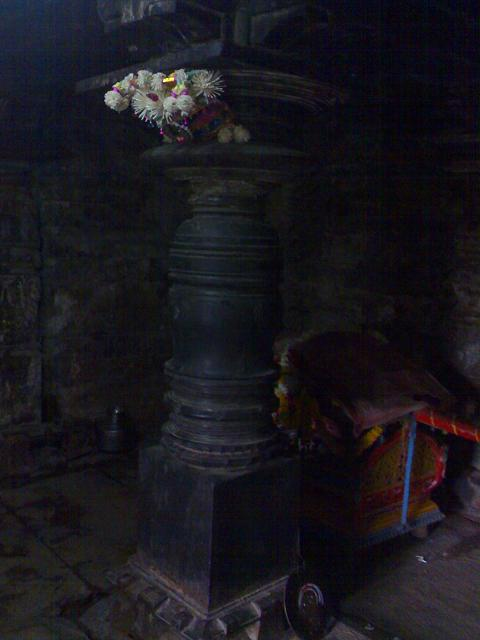

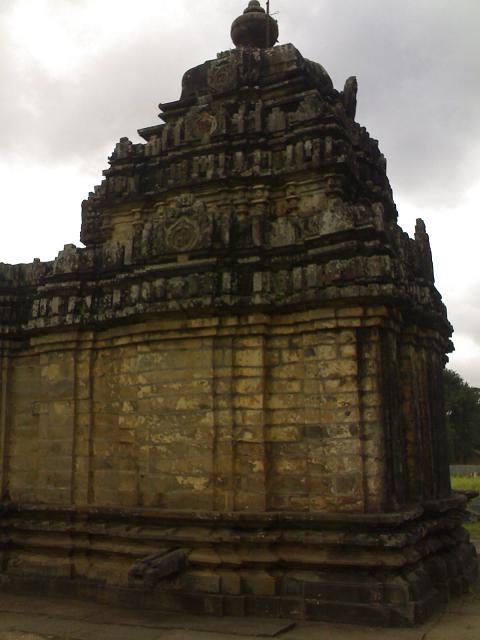

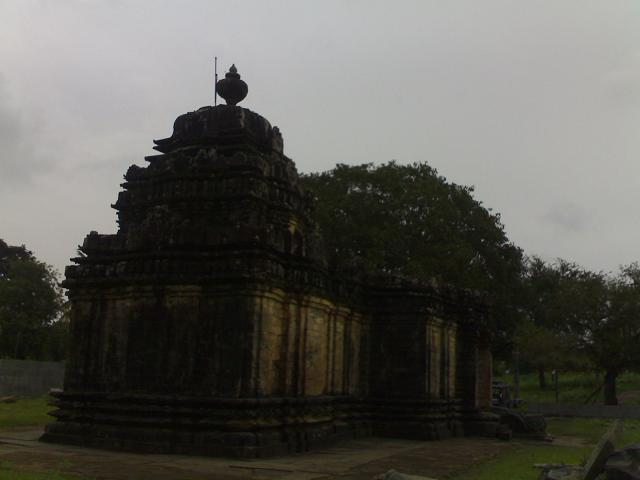

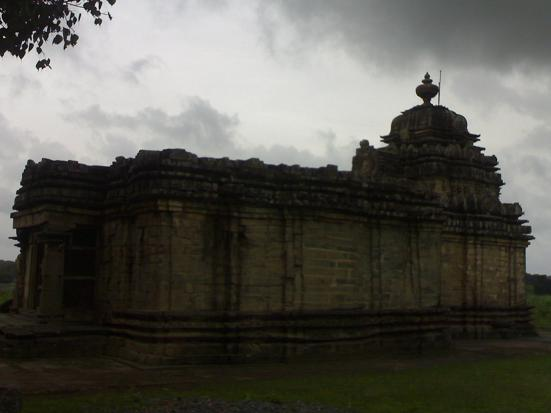

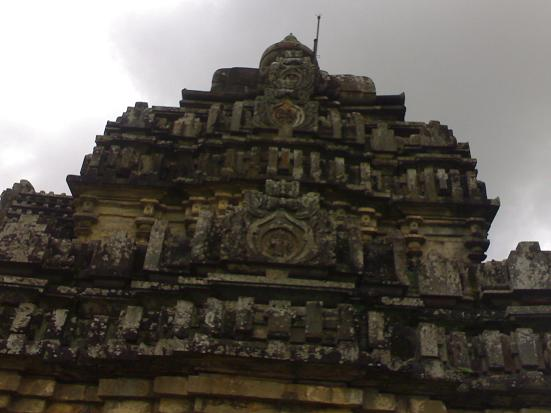

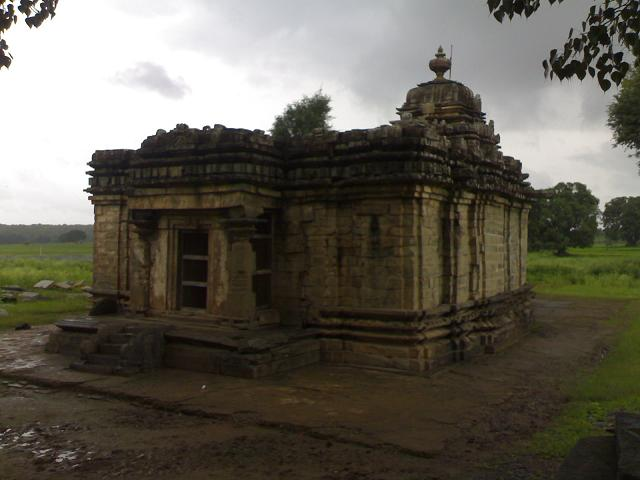

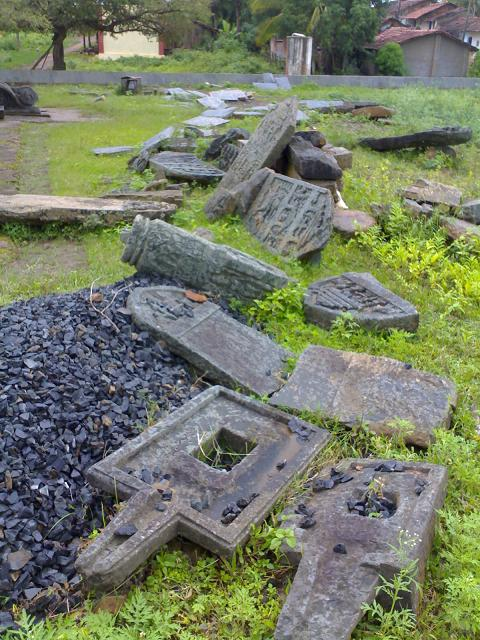

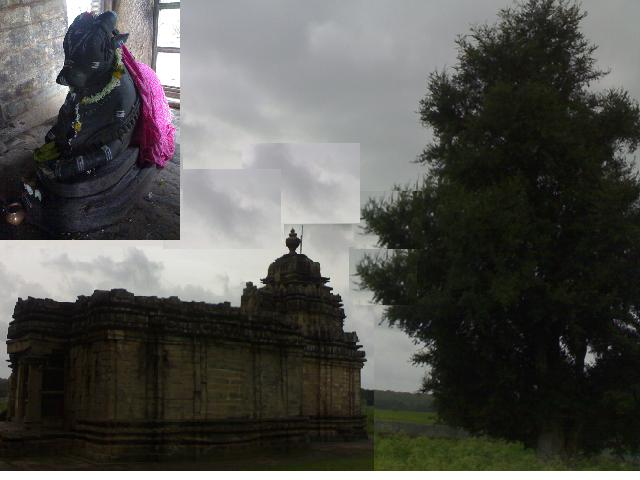

== Geography ==
Kalghatgi is located at 15.18°N 74.97°E. It has an average elevation of 536 metres (1758 feet). Kalghatgi is located 28 km from Hubli and 30 km from Dharwad.The Kalghatgi town is located on National Highway 63 (India) en route from Hubli to Ankola.

== Demographics ==
As of the 2001 India census, Kalghatgi had a population of 14,676. Males constitute 51% of the population and females 49%. Kalghatgi has an average literacy rate of 62%, higher than the national average of 59.5%. The male literacy rate is 69%, and female literacy rate is 55%. In Kalghatgi, 15% of the population is under 6 years of age.
