= Navalgund =

Navalgunda Navilagunda
- Town
- Nickname: NVL
- Location in Karnataka, India
- Coordinates: 15.57°N 75.37°E
- Country: India
- State: Karnataka
- District: Dharwad
- Elevation: 578 m (1,896 ft)

Population (2011)
  - Total: 24,613
- Time zone: UTC+5:30 (IST)
- Postal code: 582208
- Telephone code: 08380
- Vehicle registration: KA-25,KA-63
- Website: navalgundtown.mrc.gov.in

Navalgund or Navalagunda is a panchayat town in Dharwad district in the Indian state of Karnataka. Navalagunda or Navilagunda means hill of peacocks. Navalgund is famous for Navalagunda durries. Navalagunda durries has been accorded Geographical Indication (GI) tag. Its GI tag number is 51.

== Geography ==
Navalgund is located at 15.57°N 75.37°E. It has an average elevation of 578 metres (1896 feet). It is situated 35 km from Hubli and is famous as the birth place of 'Jamkhanas', the floor covering woven using cotton ropes, a kind of flat & thin carpet. Locally known as a twin town with Naragund and together they are known as Bhandayad Nadu (Land of Rebels). It is famous for the Holi festival, and Ramling Kamanna, to which people visit from various places during Holi Purnima. The Ajath Naglinga Swamy temple is in Navalgundas and well as the Nilamma Tank .

Hebsur, Alagavadi, Morab and Shalavadi are the main villages.

Bennihalla is the main stream that flows through Navalgund. A holy place near Navalagund is Yemanur. Its other neighbouring cities are Gadag, Hubli, Dharwad, Savadatti, Annigeri.

== History ==
Navalgund also has a Sufi Shrine of Mahlang Shah-Wali and it is one of few cities which have a Aasar (a revering place with Prophet Muhammad's relics). Following the Lingayat and Matha traditions of North Karnataka region, Navalgund also has Gavi Math, Panchgruha Hiremath and Hurakadli Ajjana Matha.

Navalgund has been a town ruled by many different kingdoms and dynasties. Among which Pulkeshi II, Vidyanagar Dynasty, Deccan Sultanate (especially Ali Adil Shah) are prominent. We can still find relics in Navileshwar Temple behind town's hill. Ganapati Gudi (Lord Ganesh Temple) is said to be carved by famous sculpture, Jakanachari. The care of town in later periods was done by Sardesai heritage. Lingaraj Sardesai is the most prominent and last Local ruler. They have also built Waade (High Leveled Fort) and water reservoirs to aid and protect people. Nelammana Kere and Chennammana Kere are lakes that are extensively used as water reserves of the town.

== Education ==
- Shri Shankar Arts, Commerce & Science College, Navalgund
- Shri Gurashantheshwar High School & P U College, Shalawadi
- R.G.M.C English High School, Navalgund
- Gurukul English Medium School, Navalgund
- Government Urdu Medium School, Navalgund
- Government First Grade College, Navalgund
- Sri Krishna Primary School, Navalgund
- Government ITI College, Navalgund
- Model High School, Navalgund
- Govt. School 04, Navalgund
- Rotary School, Navalgund
- NO 1 Govt. School 04, Navalgund
- Kittur rani chennamma residential school Navalagund

== Demographics ==
As of 2001 India census, Navalgund had a population of 22,200. Males constitute 51% of the population and females 49%. Navalgund has an average literacy rate of 59%, lower than the national average of 59.5%: male literacy is 68%, and female literacy is 50%. In Navalgund, 14% of the population is under 6 years of age.

=== Navalgund Religion Data 2011 ===
Population, 24,613

Hindu, 72.14%

Muslim, 26.51%

Christian, 0.16%

www.census2011.co.in
