= Dharwad district =

- District of Karnataka
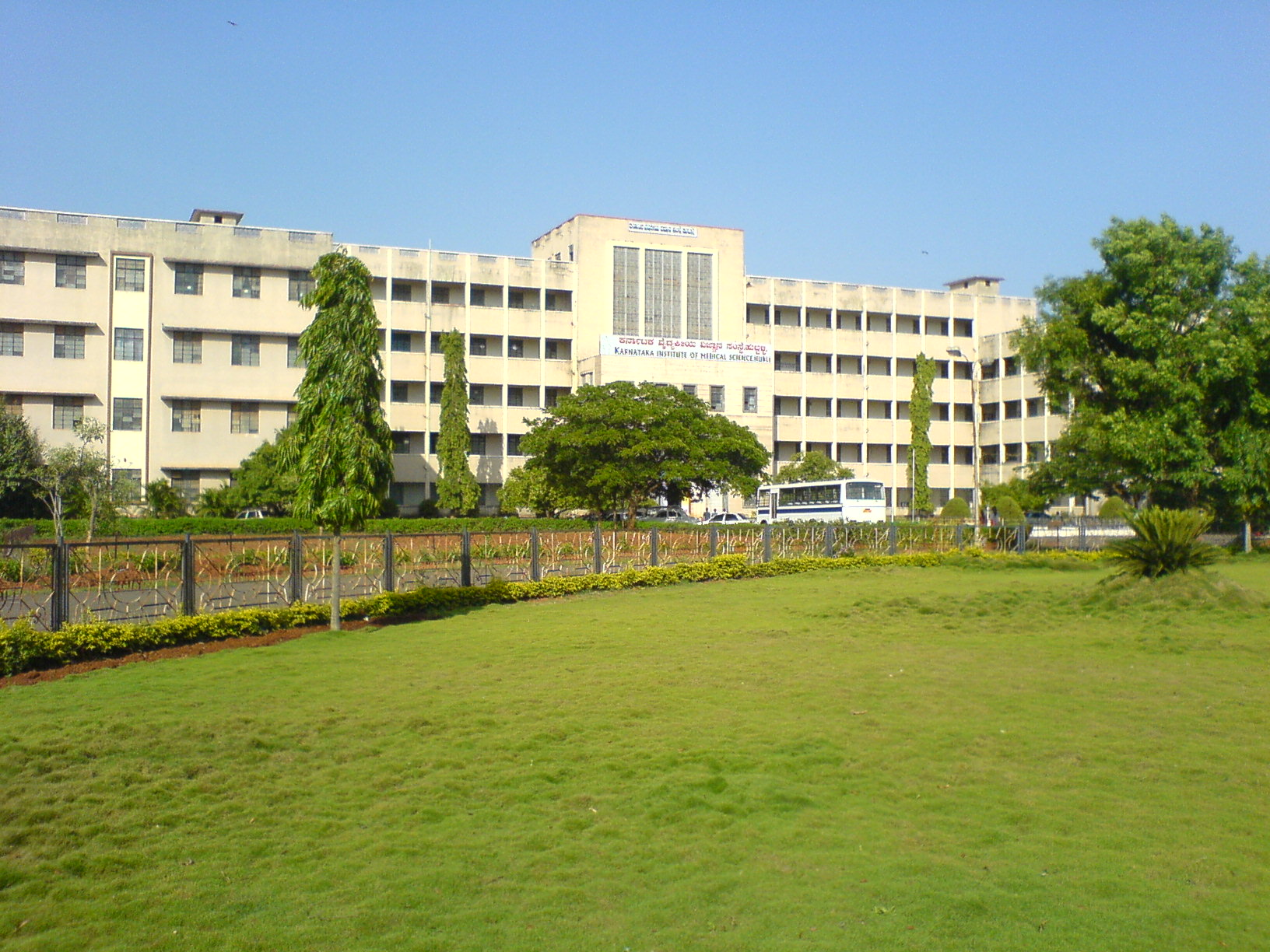
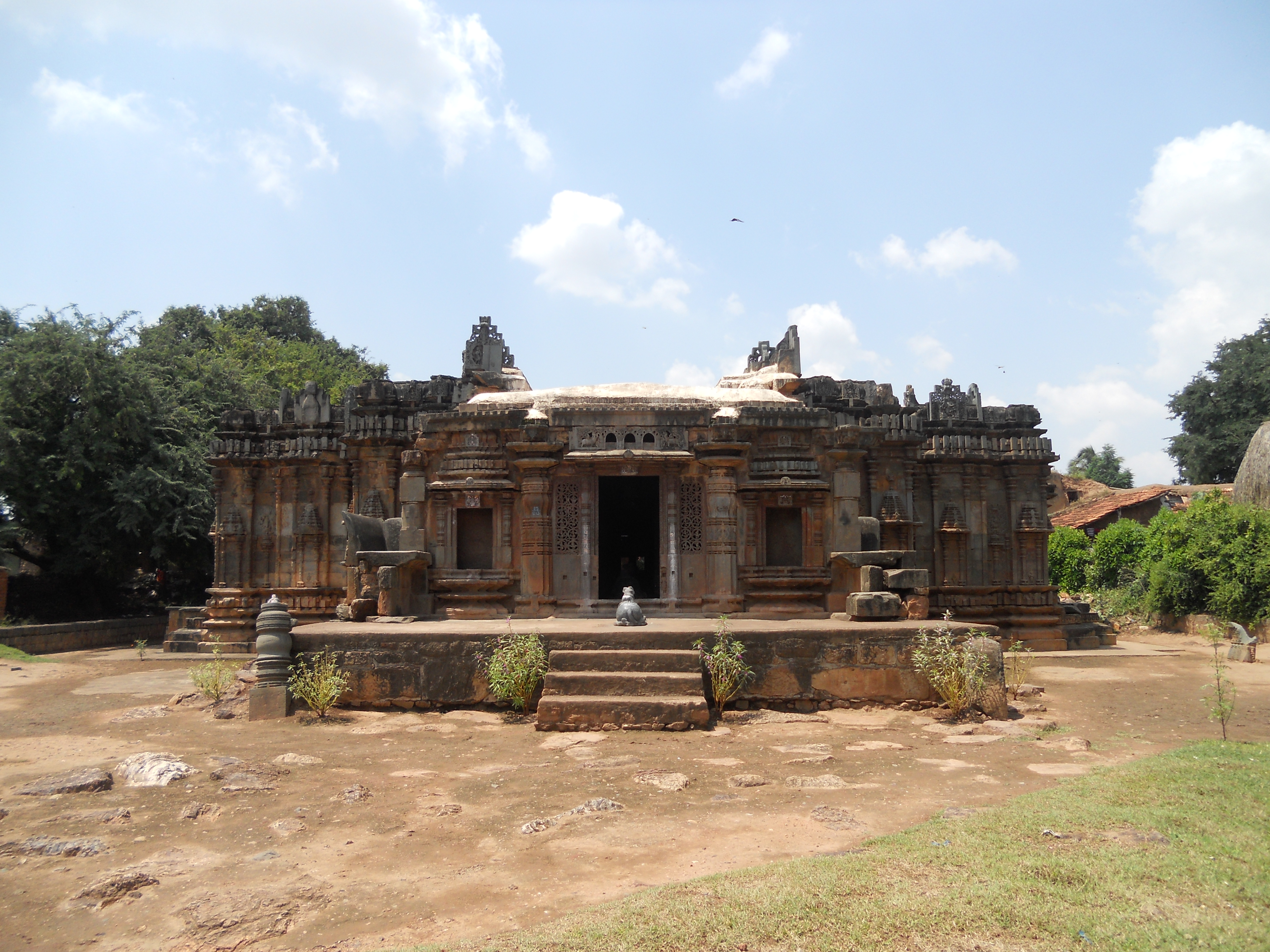
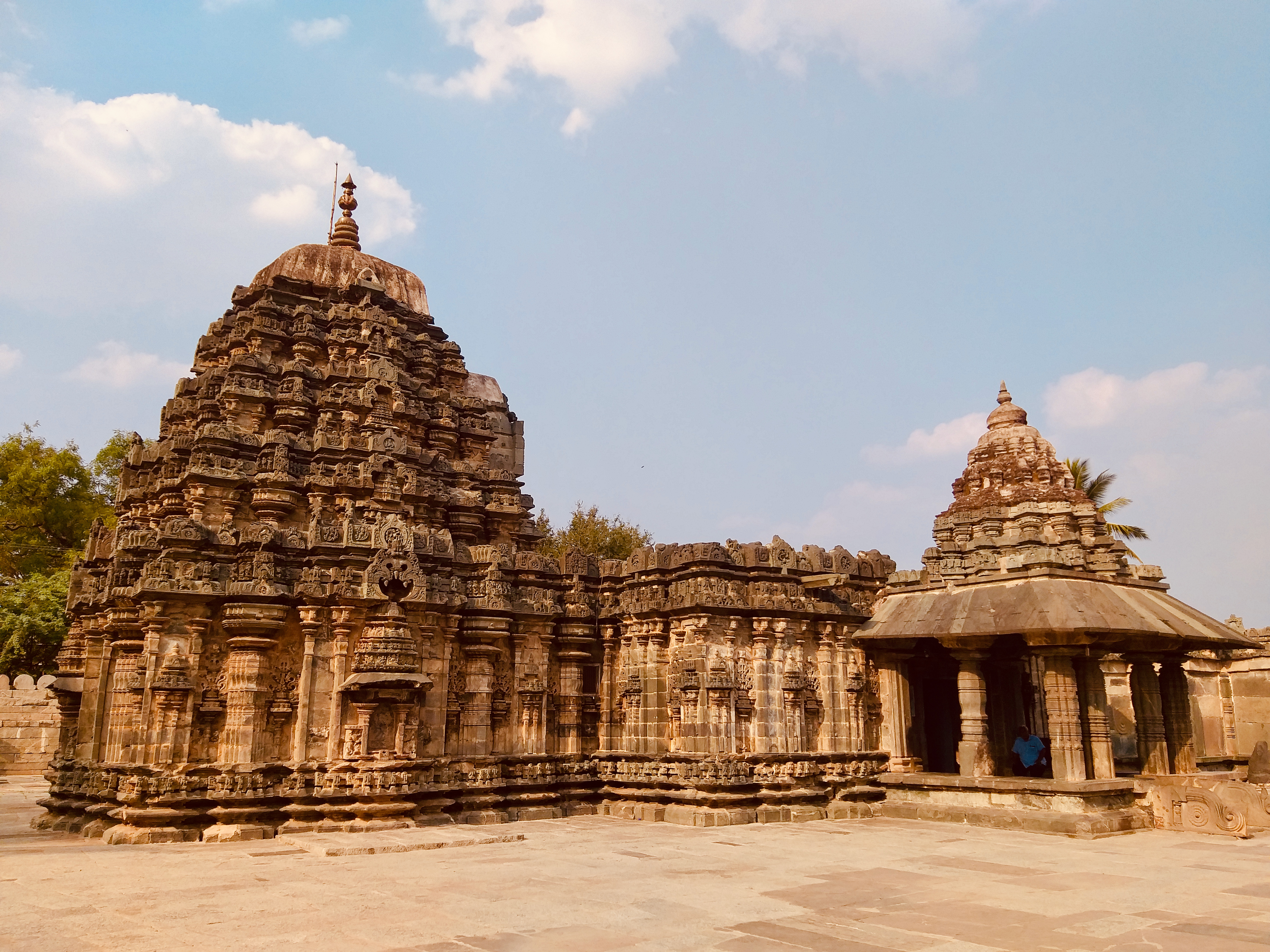
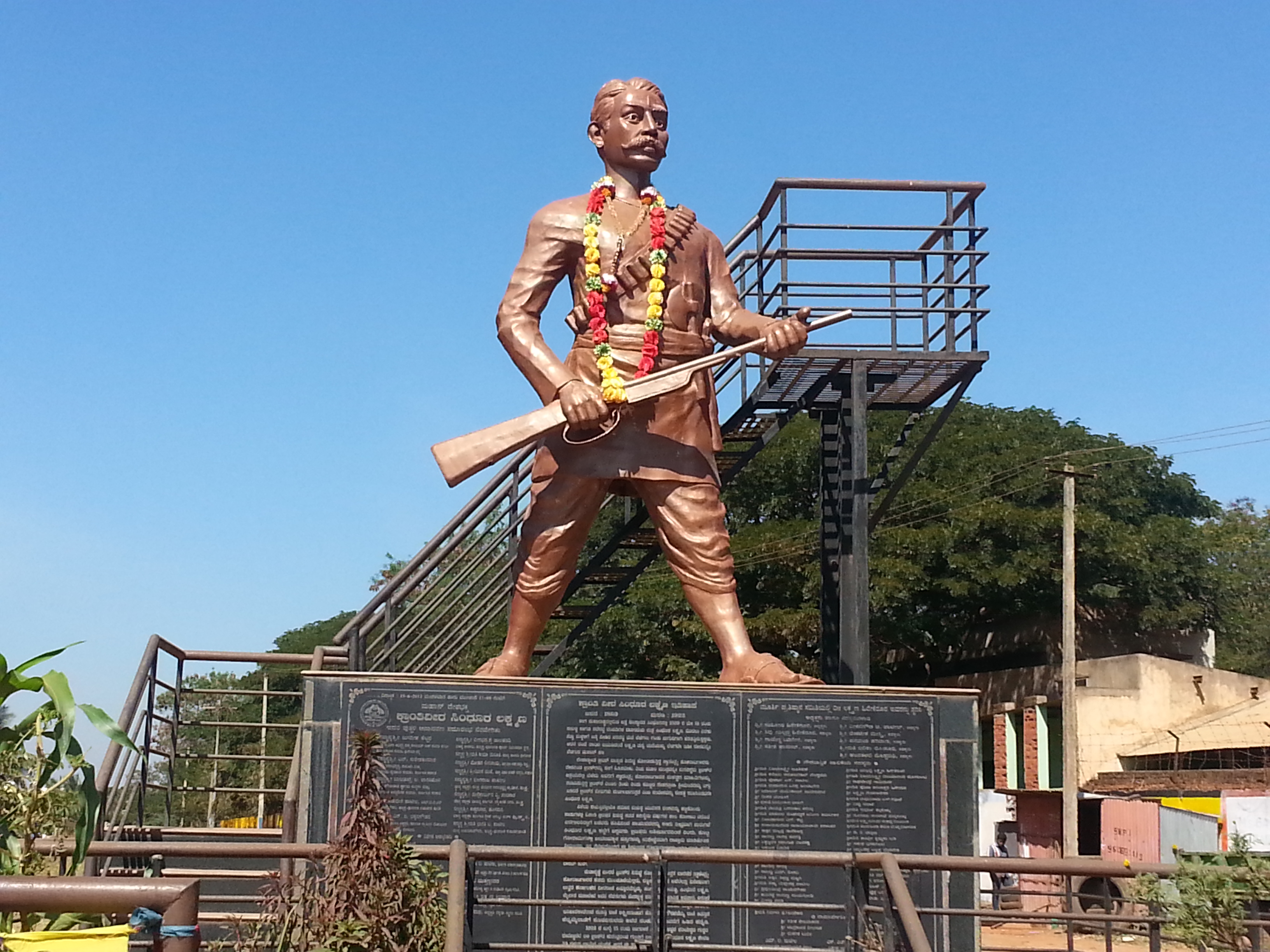
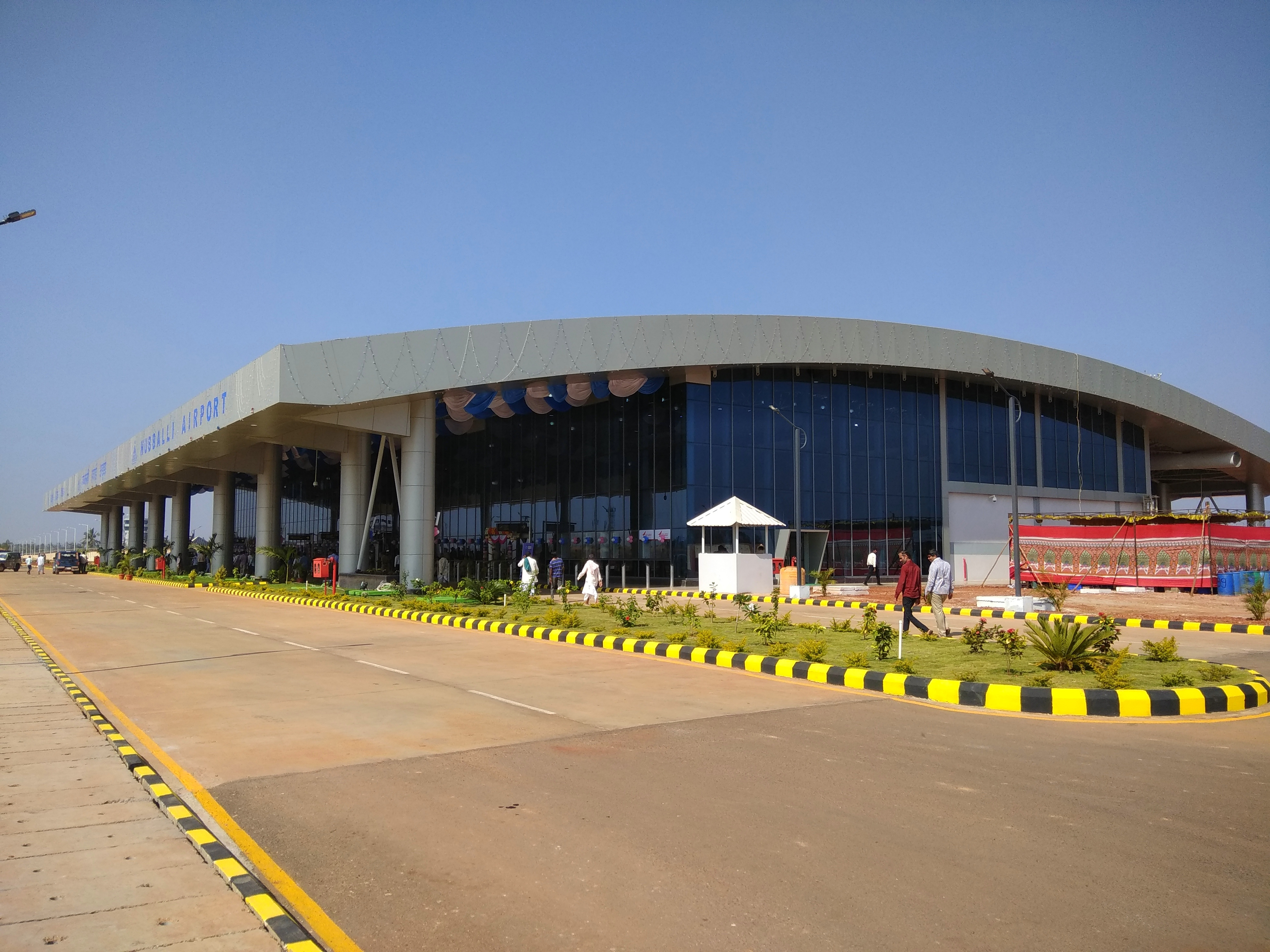
- Clockwise from top-left: Karnataka Institute of Medical Sciences, Chandramouleshwar Temple, statue of Sindhura Lakshmana, Unkal Lake, Amruteshwara Temple in Annigeri

- Location in Karnataka
- Coordinates: 15.39°N 75.12°E
- Country: India
- State: Karnataka
- Division: Belgaum division
- Headquarters: Dharwad
- Talukas: Dharwad, Hubli, Navalgund, Kundgol, Kalghatgi, Alnavar, Annigeri

Government
  - Deputy Commissioner & District Magistrate: Divya Prabhu G R J (IAS)
  - Police Commissioner, Hubballi-Dharwad City: N. Shashikumar, IPS
  - Superintendent of Police, Dharwad district: Gunjan Arya, IPS

Area
  - Total: 4,265 km^{2} (1,647 sq mi)

Population (2011)
  - Total: 1,847,023
  - Density: 433.1/km^{2} (1,122/sq mi)

Languages
  - Official: Kannada
- Time zone: UTC+5:30 (IST)
- Telephone code: + 91 (0)836
- Vehicle registration: KA-25, KA-63
- Website: dharwad.nic.in

Dharwad district or Dhārawāda district is an administrative district of the state of Karnataka in southern India. The administrative headquarters of the district is the city of Dharwad, also known as Dharwar. Dharwad is located 425 km northwest of Bangalore and 421 km southeast of Pune, on the main highway between Chennai and Pune, the National Highway 4 (NH4).

Before 1997 the district had an area of 13738 km^{2}. In 1997, the new districts of Gadag and Haveri were carved out of Dharwad's former territory, and a portion of Dharwad district was combined with lands formerly part of three other districts to create the new district of Davanagere.

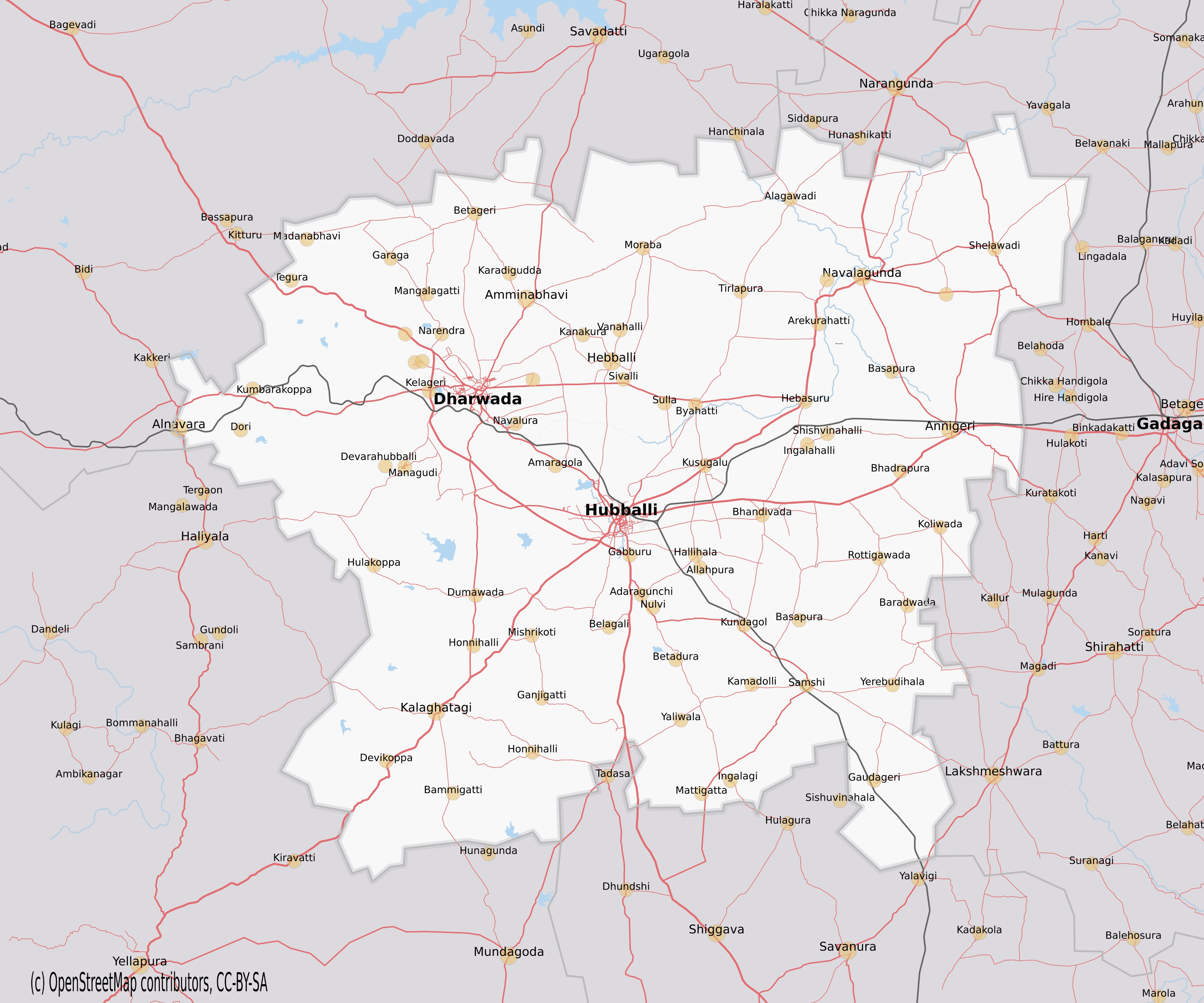
District map

== History ==
Historical studies show that people from early Paleolithic age inhabited Dharwad district. The district was ruled by various dynasties from the 5th century onwards, important among them are Badami and Kalyan Chalukyas, Rastrakutas, Vijayanagar, Adilshahi, Mysore kingdom and Peshawas of Pune. Due to the rule of Peshwas, influence of Marathi is seen in the early decades of the 19th century. During the British rule, Dharwad became the divisional headquarter of educational administration and Kannada the vernacular language of the people gained prominence

After India's independence in 1947, the Bombay Presidency was reconstituted as India's Bombay State. In 1956 the southern, Kannada-speaking districts of Bombay State, including Dharwad, were added as part of the state of Mysore. Following activist pressure, Mysore was officially renamed Karnataka in October 31, 1973. Dharwad is home to the Karnataka University and the University of Agricultural Sciences (UAS), IIT Dharwad as well as numerous other colleges.

In 1962 the towns of Dharwad and Hubli were amalgamated to constitute the Hubli-Dharwad Municipal Corporation.

== Geographical features ==
Dharwad district is situated in the western sector of the northern half of Karnataka State. The District encompasses an area of 4263 km^{2} lying between the latitudinal parallels of 15°02' and 15°51' North and longitudes of 73°43' and 75°35' East. The district is bounded on the north by the district of Belgaum, on the east by the district of Gadag, on the south by the district of Haveri and on the west by the district of Uttara Kannada. All these districts, which surround Dharwad district, belong to the state of Karnataka.

Sub Divisions of Dharwad district (Talukas):

- Alnavar
- Annigeri
- Dharwad
- Kalghatgi
- Kundgol
- Hubli
- Hubli Nagara
- Navalgund

The sistrict lies approximately 800 m above the sea level, which is why it enjoys a moderate and healthy climate. The district may be divided into 3 natural regions, the Malnad, the Semi-Malnad and the Maidan. These regions on an average receive moderate to heavy rainfall and have dense vegetation. The localities of Kalghatagi and Alnavar of Dharwad taluka in particular receive more rainfall than other talukas of the district.

On the agricultural front, the presence of black soil helps in raising crops such as cotton, wheat, ragi, jowar and oil seeds and that of red soil is more suitable for paddy.

== Industrial sector ==
Hubali is a notable industrial centre, with more than 1,000 small and medium scale industries established. They include machine tool industries, such as cotton, electrical, steel furniture, food processing, rubber, leather, and leather tanning industries.

== Transportation ==
=== Road ===
NWKRTC (North West Karnataka Road Transport Corporation) is a state run corporation headquartered at Hubballi. There is a good transportation between Hubli, Dharwad, Kalghatgi, Navalgund and Kundgol as NWKRTC and Bendre Nagara Sarige (a consortium of private bus-owners) compete to cater to the large number of commuters between these places daily. Bus services from the twin-cities exist to every part of Karnataka and neighbouring states and other destinations. There are many private bus operators who render travel services between Hubli and Bangalore, Mangalore, Pune, Mumbai, Goa and Hyderabad.

=== Railway ===
Hubli is the headquarters of South Western Railways zone of Indian Railways. There is modest intra-district Railway connectivity. Hubli has a railway junction with daily trains to Bangalore, Mumbai, Pune, Miraj, Delhi, Hyderabad, Ahmedabad, Vijayawada, Mysore. There are also weekly services to Chennai, Howrah and Thiruvananthapuram.

=== Air ===
Hubli Airport (IATA: HBX, ICAO: VOHB) serves the Dharwad district and one of the more major operational airports serving northern Karnataka. Currently, SpiceJet Airlines has started its operation from Hubli to Bangalore, Mumbai, Hyderabad, Jabalpur, Mangalore, Chennai. IndiGo Airlines has started its operation from Hubli to Ahmedabad, Chennai, Bangalore, Cochin, Goa. Meanwhile, Alliance Air operates one daily flight to the state capital of Bangalore. Air India has also started its operation from Hubli to Mumbai and Bangalore on Tuesday, Wednesday and Saturday. Lastly, Star Air will start its operations of Hubli to Bangalore, Delhi (Hindon), Pune, and Tirupati on 15 September. The airport is currently being upgraded to an international airport.

== Demographics ==
Historical population
Year	Pop.	±% p.a.
1901	421,619	—
1911	388,289	−0.82%
1921	397,902	+0.24%
1931	430,554	+0.79%
1941	466,207	+0.80%
1951	551,466	+1.69%
1961	690,668	+2.28%
1971	875,465	+2.40%
1981	1,149,153	+2.76%
1991	1,374,895	+1.81%
2001	1,604,253	+1.55%
2011	1,847,023	+1.42%

Religions in Dharwad district (2011)
Religion	Percent
Hinduism	75.26%
Islam	20.94%
Jainism	1.57%
Christianity	1.56%
Other or not stated	0.67%

According to the 2011 census, Dharwad district has a population of 1,847,023. This gives it a ranking of 256th in India, out of a total of 640 districts. The district has a population density of 434 inhabitants per square kilometre (1,120/sq mi). Its population growth rate during the decade of 2001 to 2011 was 15.13%. Dharwad has a sex ratio of 967 females for every 1000 males, and a literacy rate of 80.3%. 56.82% of the population lives in urban areas. Scheduled Castes and Scheduled Tribes make up 9.63% and 4.74% of the population respectively.

Languages in Dharwad district (2011)
1. Kannada (70.1%)
2. Urdu (18.4%)
3. Marathi (3.16%)
4. Telugu (2.36%)
5. Gujarati (1.46%)
6. Hindi (1.24%)
7. Others (3.30%)

At the time of the 2011 census, 70.08% of the population spoke Kannada, 18.40% Urdu, 3.16% Marathi, 2.36% Telugu, 1.46% Gujarati and 1.24% Hindi as their first language.

== Culture ==
According to the modern scholar Hampa Nagarajaiah ("Hampana"), ancient Kannada poet Pampa who is also called Ādikavi ("First Poet") was born in Annigeri, a town in Dharwad district.

The Dharwad district has contributed to some of the greatest exponents of Hindustani music including Sawai Gandharva, Mallikarjun Mansur, Bhimsen Joshi, Basavaraj Rajaguru, Kumar Gandharva and Gangubai Hangal.

Jnanpith Awardees D. R. Bendre, V. K. Gokak and Girish Karnad trace their origins to Dharwad. Kannada writers and critics Kirtinath Kurtakoti and C. P. Siddhashrama are also from Dharwad. Notable Marathi writer G. A. Kulkarni also lived in the district for most of his life. Actresses Shanta Hublikar and Leena Chandavarkar were born here.

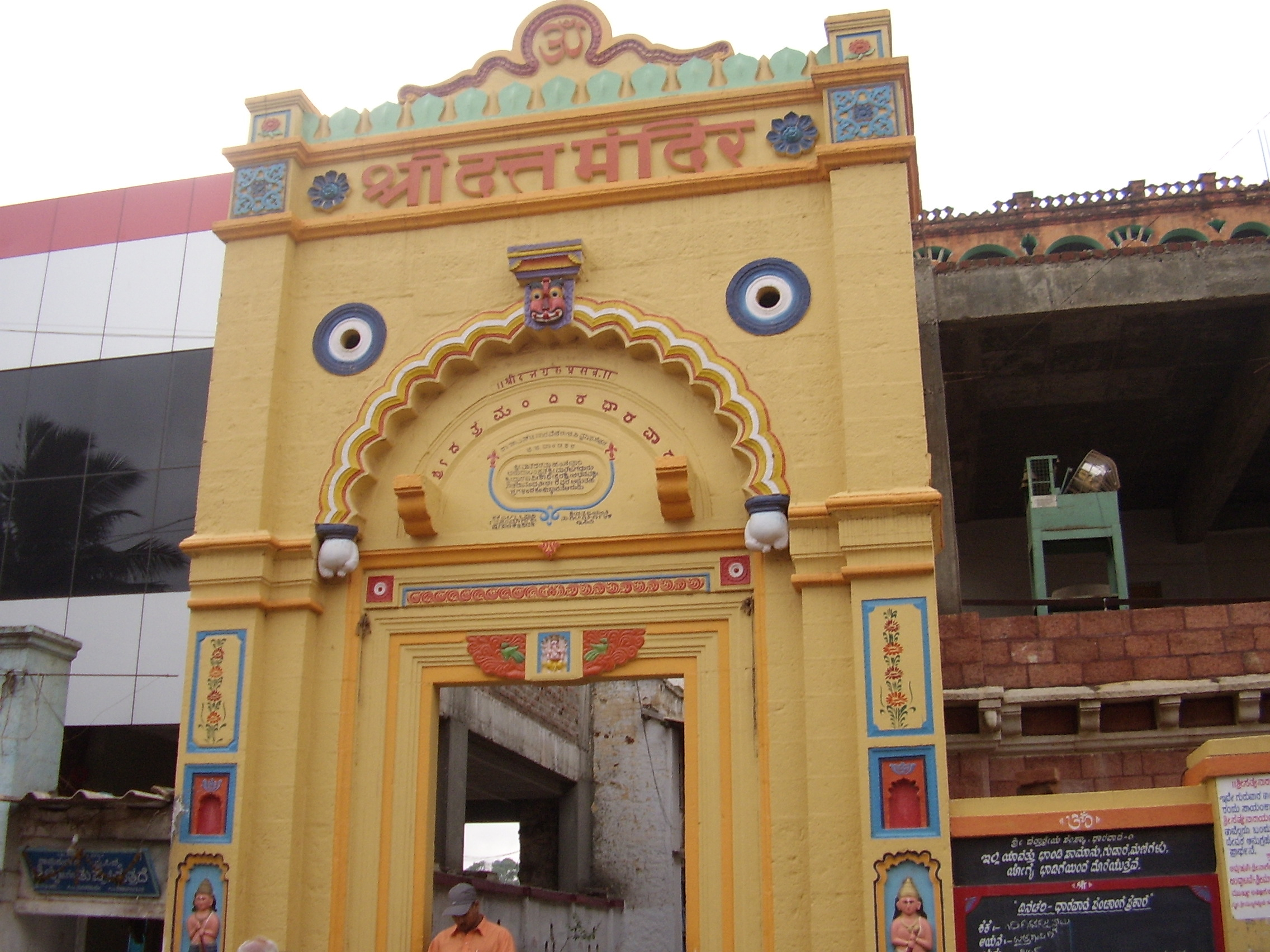
Dattatreya Temple

Nandan Nilekani, the co-chairman of Infosys moved in with his uncle's family in Dharwad for his education and was a student of St. Joseph's High School.

Sucheta Dalal, a Mumbai-based financial journalist is notable for exposing the Harshad Mehta scandal, studied in Dharwad. Supercentenarian Lucy d'Abreu was also born in Dharwad.

Dharwad is also the birthplace of Palwankar Baloo, the first member of the Dalit community to distinguish himself at cricket, and later to become a political activist for Dalit rights. Sunil Joshi, the Indian bowler, also came from Dharwad.

=== Dances ===
- Dollu Kunitha

It is a popular drum dance. The large drums are decorated with coloured cloth, and are slung around the necks of men. The dances are at times accompanied with songs relating to religious praise or wars.

- Veeragase

Veeragase is popular folk dance. It is a symbolic presentation of the heroism and valour of God Veerabahadhra. Its exponents are called Lingadevaru and they perform the dance with religious fervour at festival time especially during the months of Shravana and Kartika.

- Nandikolu kunitha

This art form is the domain of male devotees of Lord Siva. The Nandi pole is about 18 cubits in length, each cubit representing a 'dharma'. The length of the pole is fitted with brass pots and plates, and ornate silver or brass umbrella at the top with a silk tassel, which is the flag. The performer on a sling balances the pole; this requires skill as well as strength. The sight of the devotee's inspired dance, to the background beat and the resulting symphony of sounds, from the pots and plates on the pole, is truly breathtaking.

- Jodu halige

Halige meaning two percussion instruments used by two artists to produce rhythmic notes of astounding energy and power. Their movements along the stage expressive of their physical energy harmonizes with the notes produced by the instrument. The Haligi (wood) circular in shape is made of buffalo hide. A short stick is used on it. The notes combined with the bodily movement pervade the stage and overflow to the audience.

- Lambani nruthya

Lambani women dressed colourfully and move circularly with clapping and singing. This dance is out of the common. In dress, mode of living and dwelling, they dance on important festivities in a free manner.

- Veerabhadra kunitha

The dance form depicts the story of Veerabhadra, the legendary minor god created by Lord Siva to teach a lesson to his father-in-law Daksha. Veerabhadra to go to the place of the yaga and destroy the ceremony.

== Tourism ==
Places of interest in Dharwad district comprise many tourist attractions including temples and historical monuments.

- Dharwad
  - Hire Matha: Aminbhavi, about 6 km from Dharwad, is the location of 24 Tirthankara Basadi, Hire Matha and a cave temple. Hire Matha has paintings on a wooden plank. The plank is brought in from Kittur.
  - Dharwad Fort: The remains (only two main gates) of, once a great fort, now lie in the center of Dharwad and was built by Dhar Rao in the year 1403.

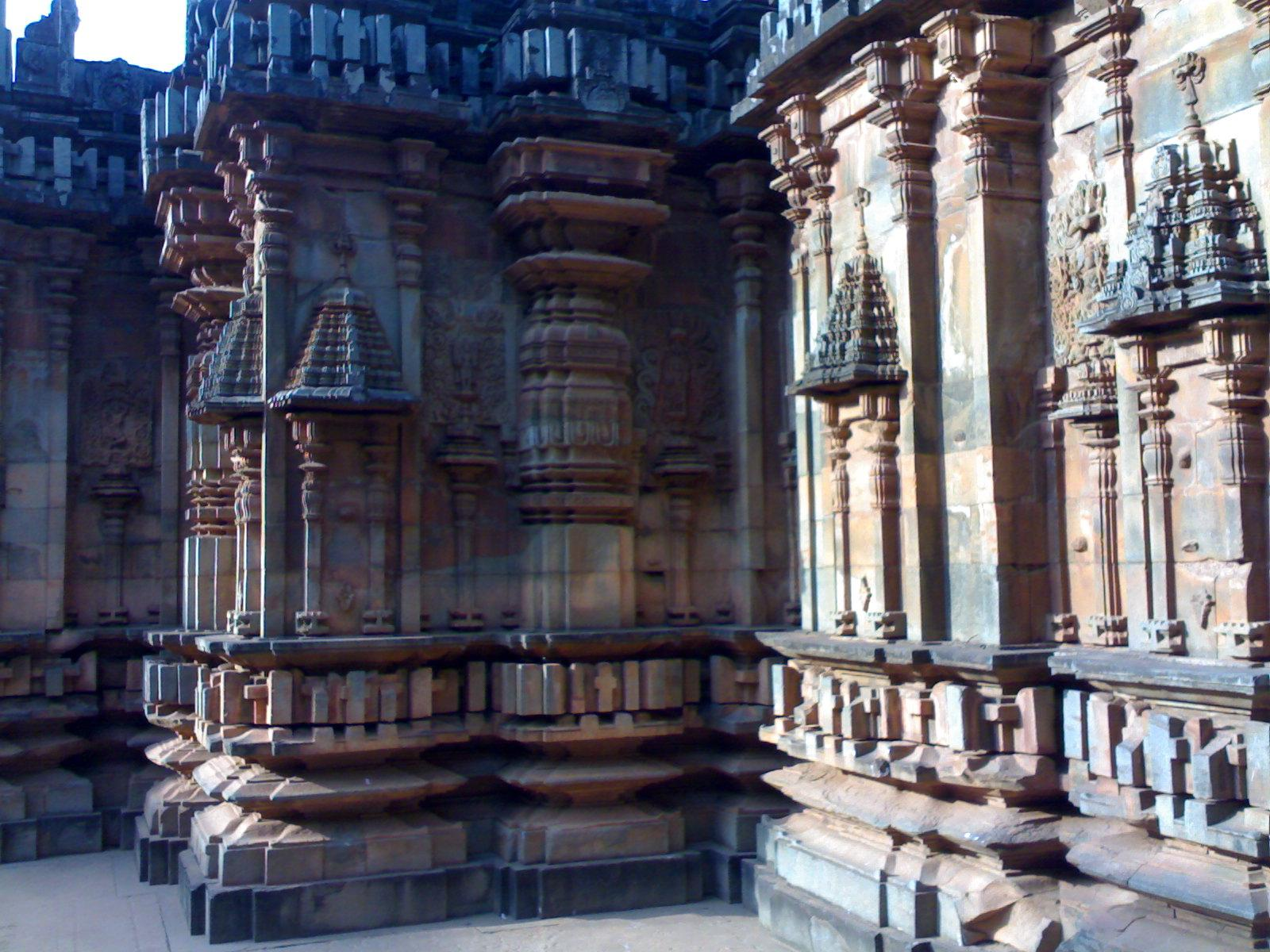
Chandramouleshwara temple at Unkal, Hubli

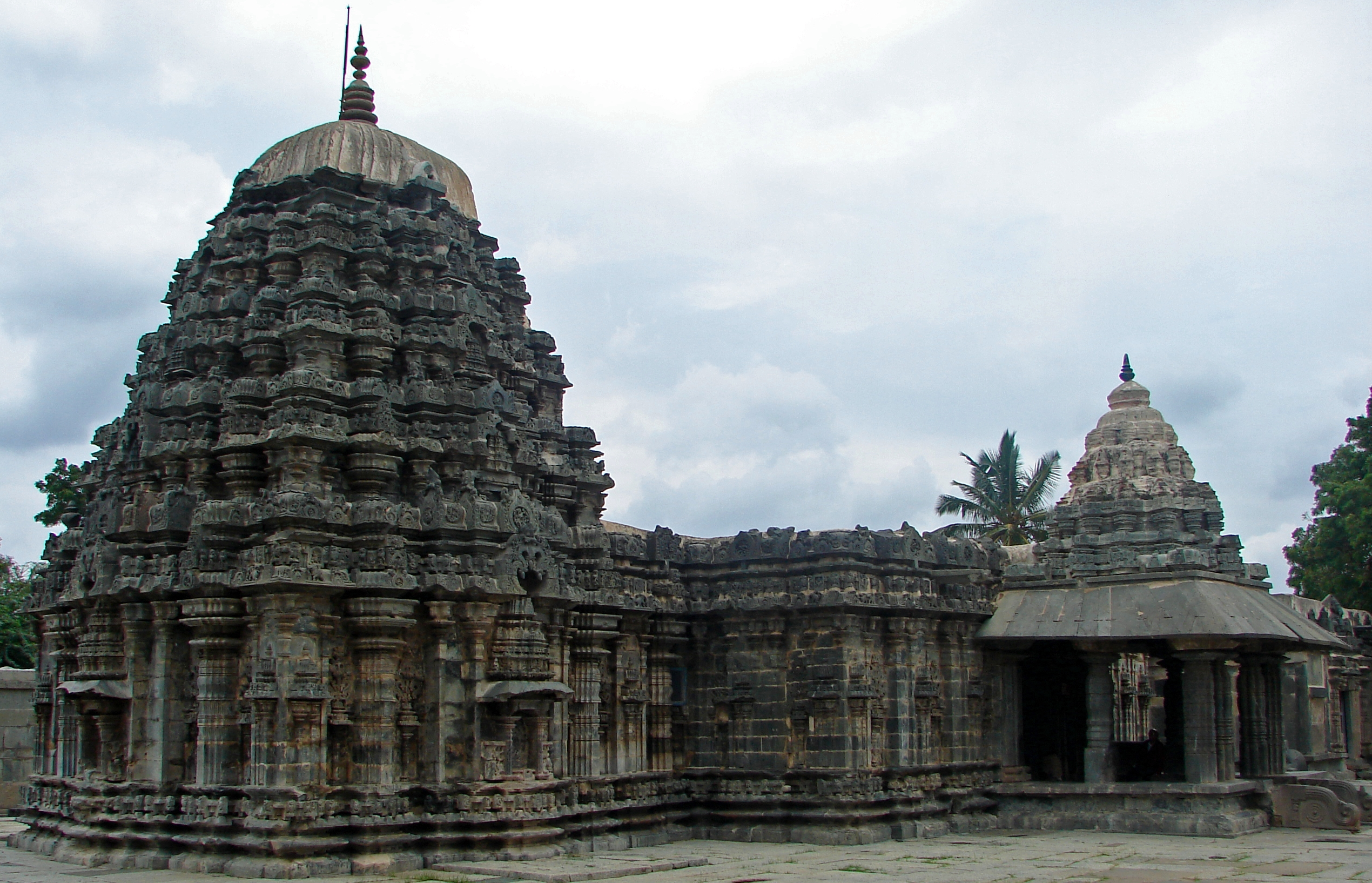
Amruteshwara Temple at Annigeri

Hubballi

- Chandramouleshwara Temple at Unkal is of the Western Chalukya period Chandramouleshwara Shiva temple and Unkal lake.
- Unkal Lake is used as a perfect picnic and has a garden, recreational facilities for children, and boating. The lake is 3 km away from Hubli.

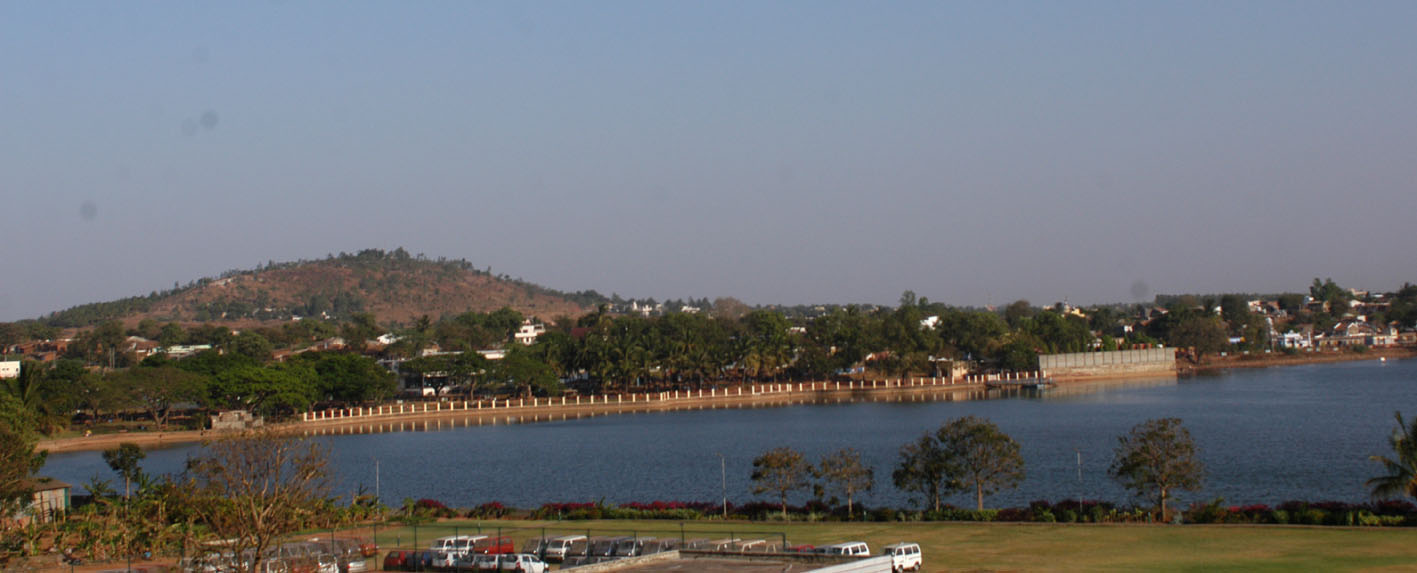
Unkal Lake

- Bhavanishankar Temple This Chalukyan temple with the image of Sri Narayana is flanked by the ten incarnations of God.
- Asar It was built by Mohammed Ali Shah in about 1646 to serve as a hall of justice. The building was also used to house two hairs from the Prophet's beard. Women are not allowed inside.
- Nrupatunga Hill is a hillock located on the North-Eastern fringe of Hubballi. The top of the hillock has views of Hubli city. The span of the view extends from Amargol in the North to the Airport in the West all the way to the Southern parts of Hubli.

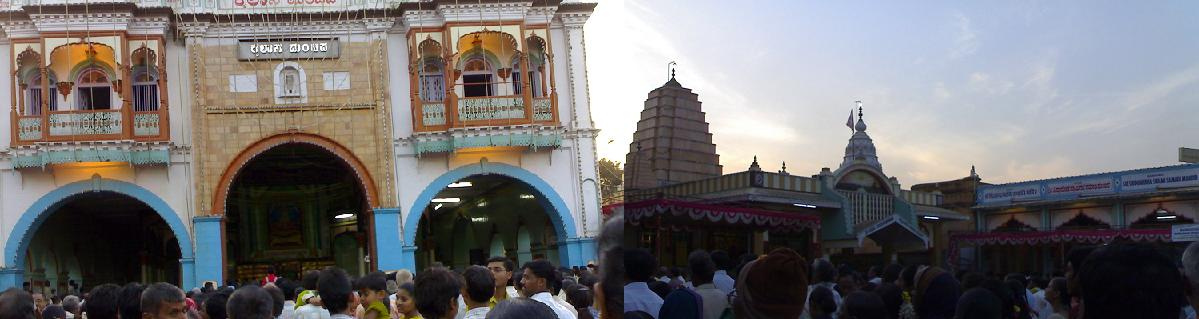
Sidharudha Math, Hubli

- Siddharoodha Math is a religious institution, a centre of Advaita philosophy as preached by Swami Siddharoodha, is located on the outskirts of Hubli.
- Glass House As the name suggests, this is a palace of glass, inaugurated by the former Indian Prime Minister, Smt. Indira Gandhi.
- Banashankari Temple Amargol is known for the Shankarlinga and Banashankari Temple. It is in between Hubli and Dharwad, and near to Navanagar.
- Annigeri has many historical temples including Kalyani Chalukya period Amriteshwara temple. It is about 30 km from Hubli, between Hubli and Gadag.
- Kundgol is about 15 km from Hubli-Dharwad. It is home to the Shambhulinga temple. It is known for its place in the history of Hindustani Music in Karnataka. Birthplace of Sawai Gandharva. Bharat Ratna Pandit Bhimsen Joshi and Gangubai Hangal learnt Hindustani music here and Sawai Gandharva was their Guru.
- Kalghatgi:
  - Tamboor about 8 km from Kalghatgi. It home to the Basavanna temple and Devikoppa Forest.
  - Shri Basaveshwar Temple is located in Bhogenagarakoppa at a distance of approximately 14 km from Kalghatagi.
  - Mahalakshmi temple
  - Shantinatha Basadi Jain temple

== People, language, customs ==
Kannada is most spoken language in this district. The Kannada spoken here is known as Dharwad Kannada. This slightly varies from Kannada spoken in southern Karnataka. Men in rural areas wear headgear called a turban or Pheta. Also many wear white cap on their head.

== Agriculture and commerce ==
Jowar, maize, wheat, cotton, onions and rice are grown. The district also grows mangoes, papaya, and bananas as horticultural produce. There are many subsidiary agricultural industries such as the production of puffed rice, beaten rice, and edible oils.

== Notable people ==
- G. S. Amur
- K. S. Amur
- D. R. Bendre
- Kumar Gandharva
- Sawai Gandharva
- Gangubai Hangal
- Shanta Hublikar
- Suresh Heblikar
- R. C. Hiremath
- Bhimsen Joshi
- Girish Karnad
- G. A. Kulkarni
- Sarojini Mahishi
- Mallikarjun Mansur
- Sudha Murthy
- D. C. Pavate
- Basavaraj Rajguru
- C. P. Siddhashrama

== See also ==
- Western Chalukya temples
- Western Chalukya architecture
- Western Chalukya Empire
- North Karnataka
- Tourism in Karnataka
- Shalavadi
