= Medleri =

Coordinates: 14°40′N 75°44′E

- village
- Interactive map of Medleri
- Country: India
- State: Karnataka
- District: Haveri
- Talukas: Ranibennur

Population (2001)
  - Total: 9,426

Languages
  - Official: Kannada
- Time zone: UTC+5:30 (IST)

Medleri is a village in the southern state of Karnataka, India. It is located in the Ranibennur taluk of Haveri district in Karnataka.

== Demographics ==
As of 2001 India census, Medleri had a population of 9426 with 4838 males and 4588 females.

== See also ==
- Ranebennur
- Haveri
- Districts of Karnataka
