= Chaudayyadanapura =

Chaudayyadanapur Chaudadanapur
- town
- Location in Karnataka, India
- Coordinates: 14.767°N 75.626°E
- Country: India
- State: Karnataka
- District: Haveri

Languages
  - Official: Kannada
- Time zone: UTC+5:30 (IST)
- ISO 3166 code: IN-KA
- Vehicle registration: KA-27
- Nearest city: Ranebennur
- Website: karnataka.gov.in

Chaudayyadanapur is a small village in Ranebennur taluk of Haveri District in Karnataka state of India. All facets of Indian civilisation (religion, art, and poetry) are exemplified in an exquisite Mukteshwara temple, located within the village.

== Introduction ==
Shivapur, the old name of Chaudadanapur (Chaudayyadanapur) comes from a 12th-century saint and social reformer Basaveshwar, who donated this village to Ambigara Chaudayya (a boatman). The current name is therefore Chaudayyadanapur or Chaudadanapur.

The temple of Mukteshwar at Chaudayyadanapur in Ranebennur Taluk is a representative of the style and the culture of that time.

== The Mukteshwar Temple ==
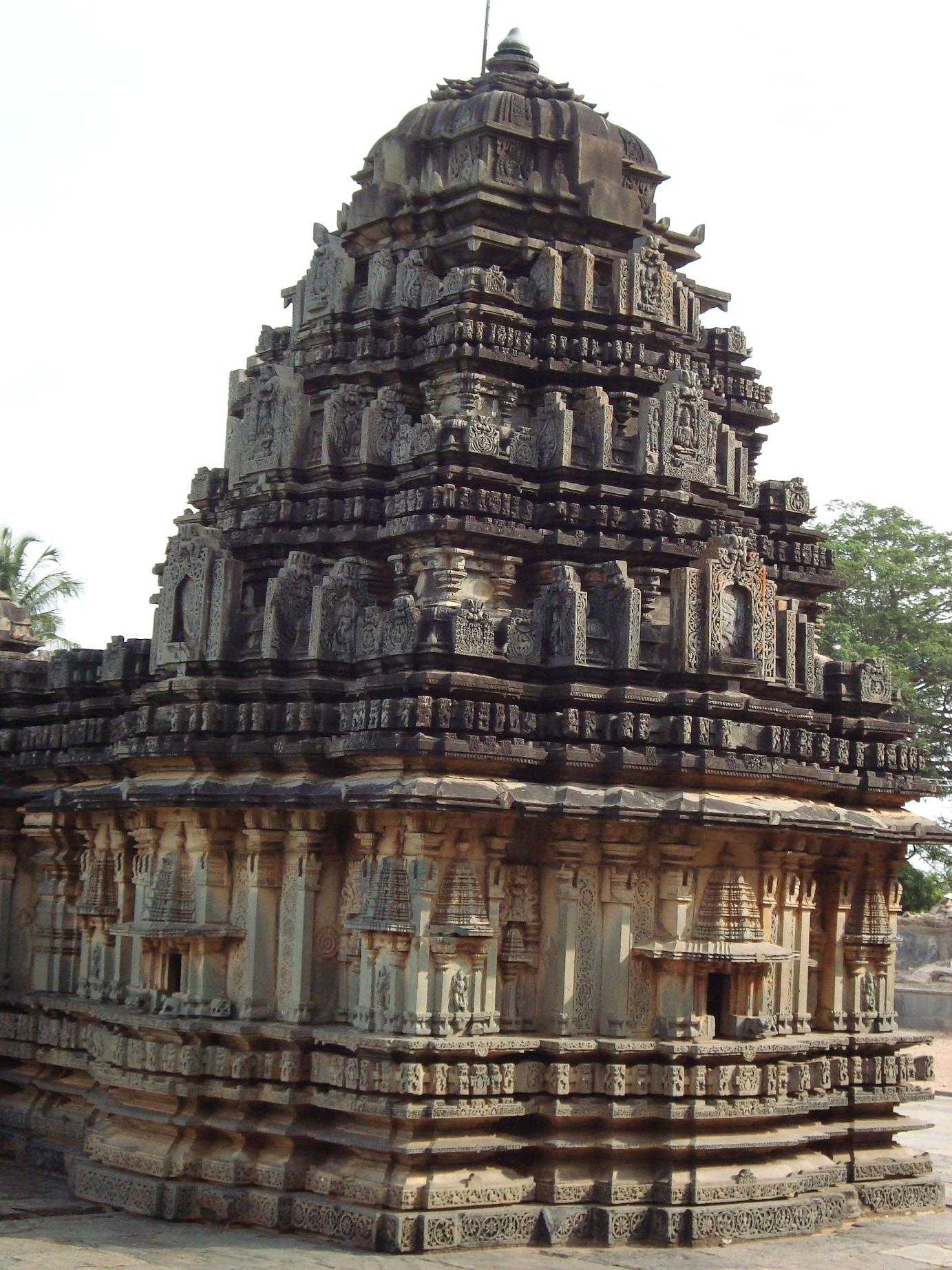
Chaudayyadanapur Mukteshwar temple, Haveri District, Karnataka

The Mukteshwar Temple is a single cella temple in Jakkanachari style. Similar temples were built under the patronage of Kalachuris of Kalyani or Seuna dynasties. This temple is a jewel of architecture of the 11th–12th centuries. It was built during the heyday of the kingdom ruled by the Kalyani Chalukyas and the Seunas of Devagiri. It is dedicated to an Udbhava (spontaneously born) Lingam named Mukteshwar.

The dome of the temple is hollow and is closed by the slabs of the stupi. Shikhara of the Mukteshwara temple is 2.2 m in its axis at the base. The stupi is made of three beautiful lotiform mouldings diminishing in size and a lotus bud with its base.

== Kannada inscriptions ==
=== History ===
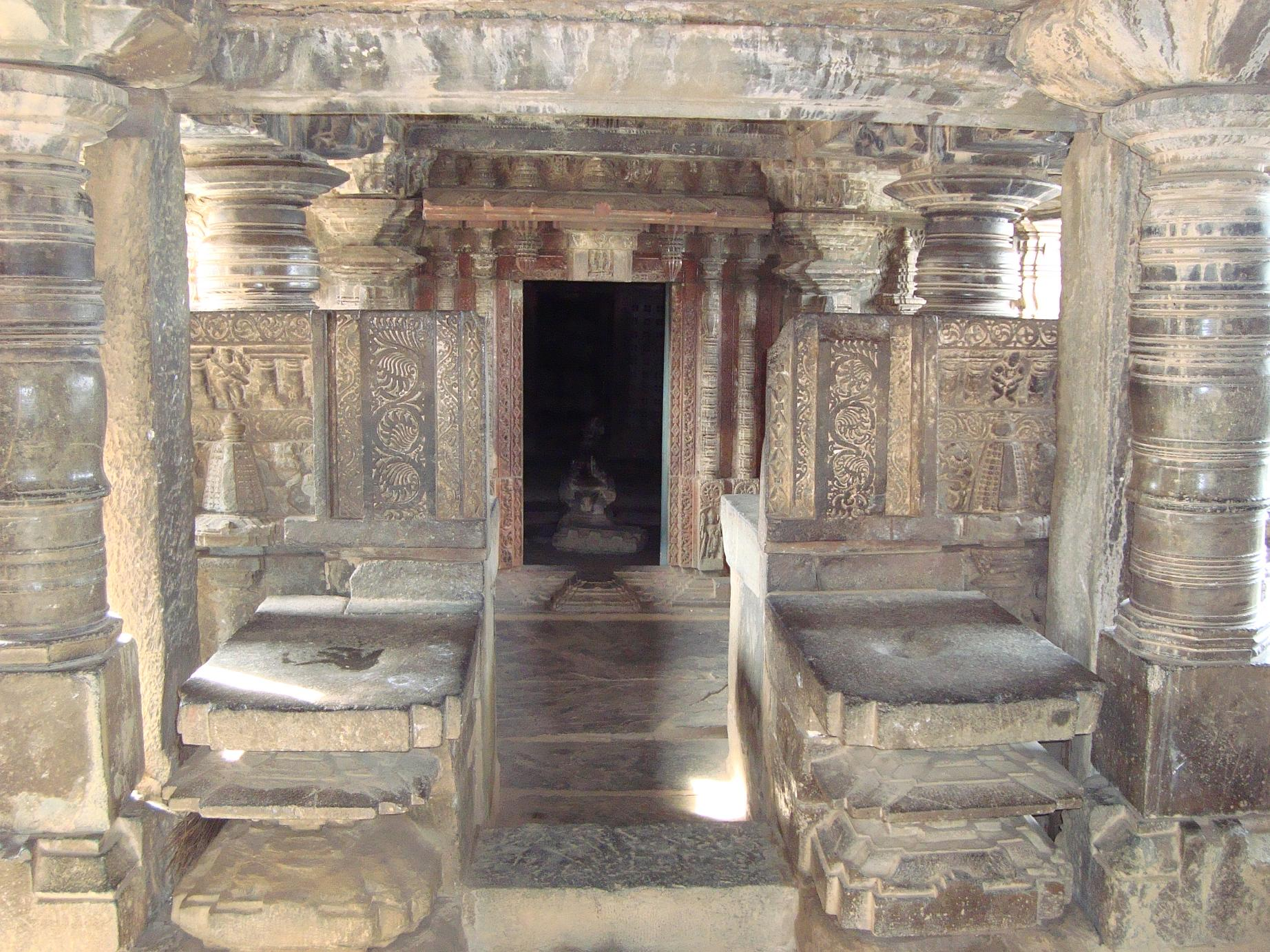
Chaudayyadanapur Mukteshwar temple, Haveri District, Karnataka

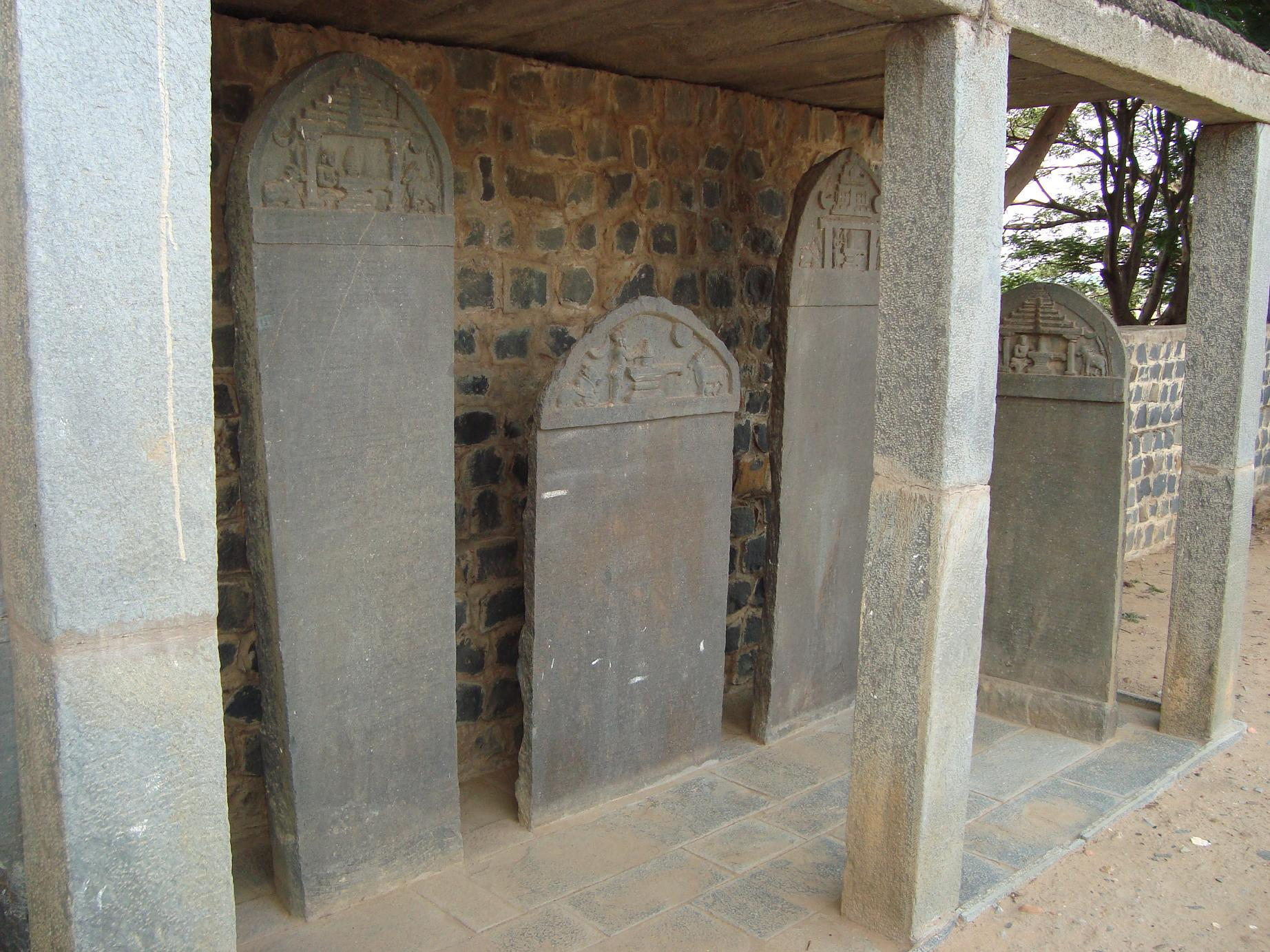
Seven inscriptions at Chaudayyadanapur Mukteshwar temple, Haveri District, Karnataka

The history of Mukteshwar Temple at Chaudayyadanapur is known through seven inscriptions in medieval Kannada, engraved on large steles. They provide information on the local rulers, kings of Guttala (Gupta ascendancy), on some constructions in the temple complex, on diverse donations to the deity.

They provide the details on a prominent religious leaders. Inscriptions introduce Muktajiyar, a Lakulasaiva saint, and Shivadeva, a Virashaiva saint, who entered the place on 19 August 1225 and led there a long life of renunciation, asceticism and spiritual elevation. The legacy of this age of intense Shaivism is a jewel of architecture and sculpture.

== Conservation and restoration ==
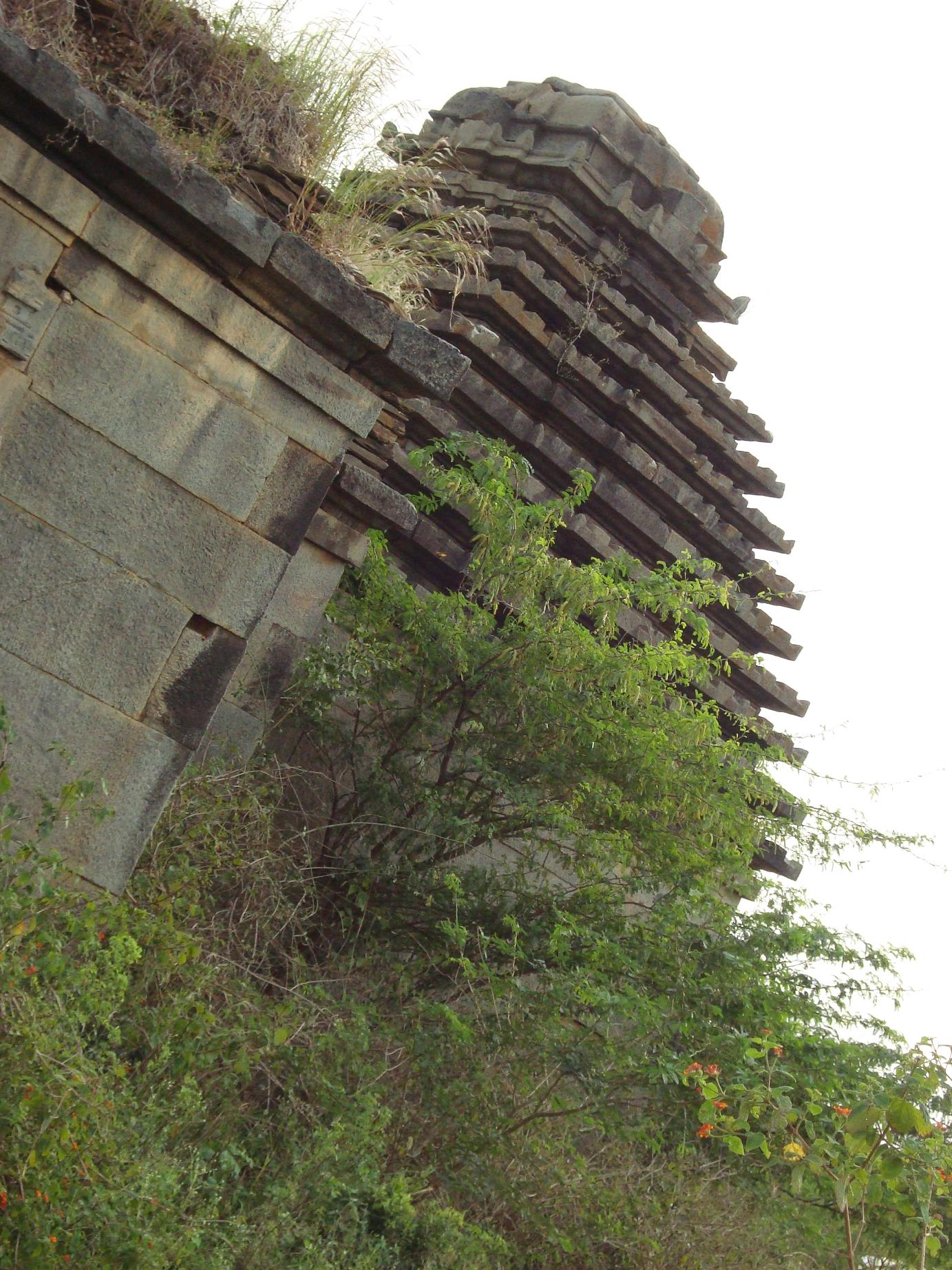
Narasimha temple Narasapur near Chaudayyadanapur, en route to Guttal, Haveri District, Karnataka

There is a need of immediate conservation and restoration for the Narasimha temple Narasapur.

== See also ==
- North Karnataka
- Tourism in North Karnataka
- Ranebennur
- Haveri
- Galaganatha
- Mylara Lingeshwara Temple at Mylara
- Hangal
- Bankapur
- Kaginele
