= Kawalettu =

- village
- Country: India
- State: Karnataka
- District: Haveri
- Talukas: Ranibennur

Population (2001)
  - Total: 5,594

Languages
  - Official: Kannada
- Time zone: UTC+5:30 (IST)

Kawalettu is a village in the southern state of Karnataka, India. It is located in the Ranibennur taluk of Haveri district in Karnataka.

== Demographics ==
As of 2001 India census, Kawalettu had a population of 5594 with 2899 males and 2695 females.

== See also ==
- Haveri
- Districts of Karnataka
