= Haligeri =

- village
- Country: India
- State: Karnataka
- District: Haveri
- Talukas: bagalkote

Government
  - Body: Gram panchayat

Population (2001)
  - Total: 6,938

Languages
  - Official: Kannada
- Time zone: UTC+5:30 (IST)
- ISO 3166 code: IN-KA
- Vehicle registration: KA
- Website: karnataka.gov.in

Haligeri is a village in the southern state of Karnataka, India. It is located in the Ranibennur taluk of Haveri district in Karnataka.

== Demographics ==
As of 2001 India census, Haligeri had a population of 6938 with 3558 males and 3380 females.

== See also ==
- Haveri
- Districts of Karnataka
