= Rattihalli =

- Town
- Location in Karnataka, India Rattihalli (India)
- Coordinates: 14.4167°N 75.5000°E
- Country: India
- State: Karnataka
- District: Haveri
- Talukas: Hirekerur

Population (2001)
  - Total: 11,702

Languages
  - Official: Kannada
- Time zone: UTC+5:30 (IST)

Rattihalli is a new taluk in the southern state of Karnataka, India. It is located in the Haveri district in Karnataka. It is around 26 km from Ranebennur and around 16 km from Hirekerur. The Veerabhadreshwara Car festival is very famous in Rattihalli.

== History ==
Rattihalli was popular during the rule of Kadambas of Banavasi and Rashtrakuta. Earlier Rattihalli was called as Rashtrapalli by Rashtrakuta.

In the 18th century, Haidar Ali (Mysore) captured Rattihalli with the help of Fazallula. The town was later captured for the Maratha Confederacy by Peshwa Madhav Rao during the Maratha-Mysore wars.

== Demographics ==
As of the India 2001 census, Rattihalli had a population of 11702 with 6056 males and 5646 females.

== See also ==
- Ranebennur
- Haveri
- Districts of Karnataka
