= Kodiyal =

Kodiyal Kumara patnamma
- city
- Location in Karnataka, India
- Coordinates: 14.56°N 75.73°E
- Country: India
- State: Karnataka
- District: Haveri

Population (2001)
  - Total: 7,832

Languages
  - Official: Kannada
- Time zone: UTC+5:30 (IST)

Kodiyal is a census town in Haveri district in the Indian state of Karnataka.

== Demographics ==
As of 2001 India census, Kodiyal had a population of 6726. Males constitute 52% of the population and females 48%. Kodiyal has an average literacy rate of 72%, higher than the national average of 59.5%: male literacy is 79%, and female literacy is 66%. In Kodiyal, 12% of the population is under 6 years of age.
