= Hanamanakoppa =

- Village
- Country: India
- State: Karnataka
- District: Dharwad

Government
  - Type: Panchayat raj
  - Body: Gram panchayat

kannada
  - Official: Kannada
- Time zone: UTC+5:30 (IST)
- ISO 3166 code: IN-KA
- Vehicle registration: KA 27
- Website: karnataka.gov.in

Hanamanakoppa is a small village in Haveri district, Hanagal taluk, Karnataka, India.
