= Ganjigatti =

Ganjigatti homble village
- Village
- Ganjigatti
- Nickname: ganjigudda
- Country: India
- State: Karnataka
- District: Haveri
- Founder: Manjunath Maridyamannanavar

Government
  - Type: Panchayat raj
  - Body: Gram panchayat

Population (2011)
  - Total: 4,406

Languages
  - Official: Kannada
- Time zone: UTC+5:30 (IST)
- Postal code: 581205
- ISO 3166 code: IN-KA
- Vehicle registration: KA27
- Website: karnataka.gov.in

Ganjigatti is a village in Haveri district of Karnataka, India.

== Demographics ==
As of the 2011 Census of India there were 848 households in Ganjigatti and a total population of 4,406 consisting of 2,198 males and 2,208 females. There were 570 children ages 0-6.
