= Handiganur =

Village in Karnataka, India

Handiganur Desalli
- Village
- Country: India
- State: Karnataka
- District: Haveri
- Talukas: Haveri

Languages
  - Official: Kannada
- Time zone: UTC+5:30 (IST)

Handiganur is a village in Haveri district in the northern state of Karnataka, India.
