= Siddhesvara Temple =

Temple in Karnataka, India

Coordinates: 14°47′26″N 75°24′39″E

Siddhesvara Temple

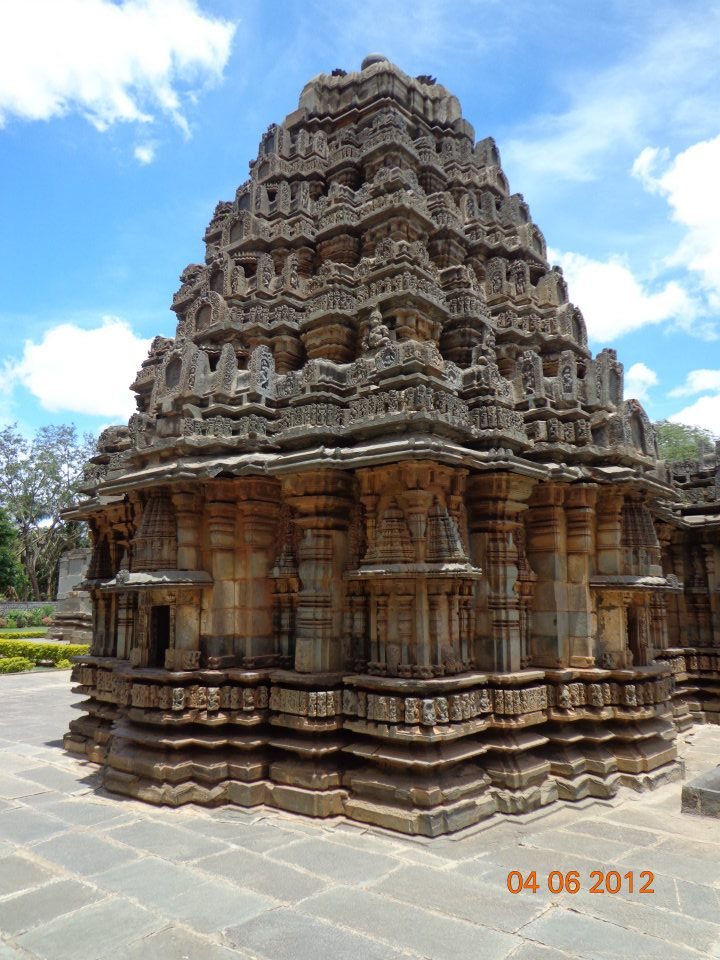
Vimana (Shrine and superstructure) at the Siddhesvara temple, Haveri.

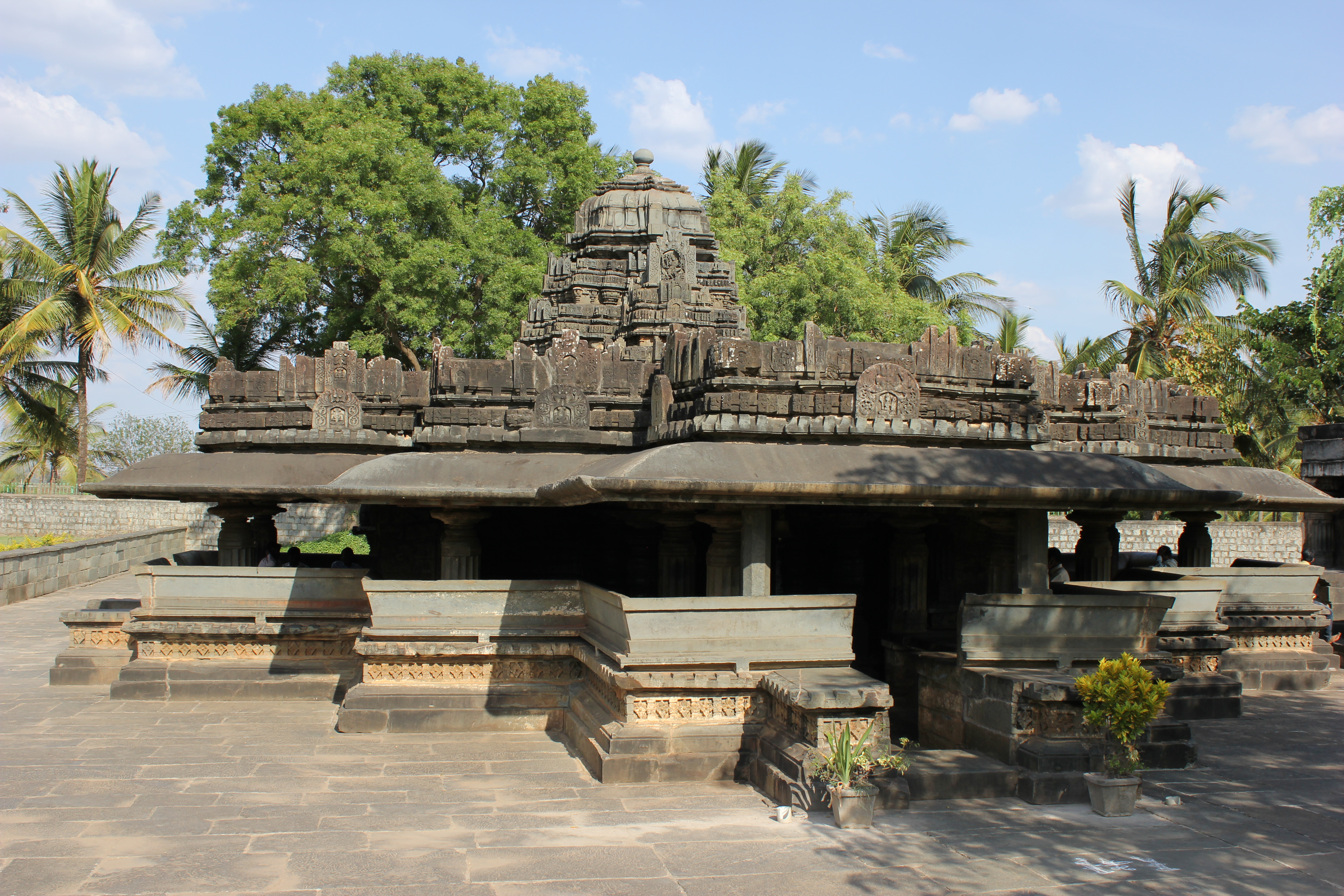
Siddheshvara Temple at Haveri, a staggered square plan with dravida articulation and superstructure, late 11th century CE.

The Siddhesvara Temple (also spelt Siddheshvara or Siddheshwara and locally called Purada Siddeshwara ) is located in Haveri in Haveri district, Karnataka state, India. It is considered an ornate example of 12th-century Western Chalukyan art and is well known for the many loose sculptures of Hindu deities that exist in it. However, inscriptional evidence would suggest that the initial consecration of the temple was in the late 11th century. An exciting aspect of the temple is that it faces west instead of facing the rising sun in the east–a standard in Chalukyan constructions. Though it is currently used as a Shaiva temple dedicated to God Shiva, historians are unsure by which faith or sect the temple was consecrated initially and to which deity. Many people visit the temple for their spiritual beliefs, while evidence about temple visits can be found in Gita chapter 17, verse 23, which says otherwise. Most of the Lord Shiva sculptures are observed to be of him meditating. There are claims that he meditates on himself, whereas some proof can be found in Devi-Bhagavata Purana that Lord Shiva meditates for some other God. This uncertainty perhaps stems from the many loose sculptures of deities and the degradation of primary wall images.

== Temple plan ==
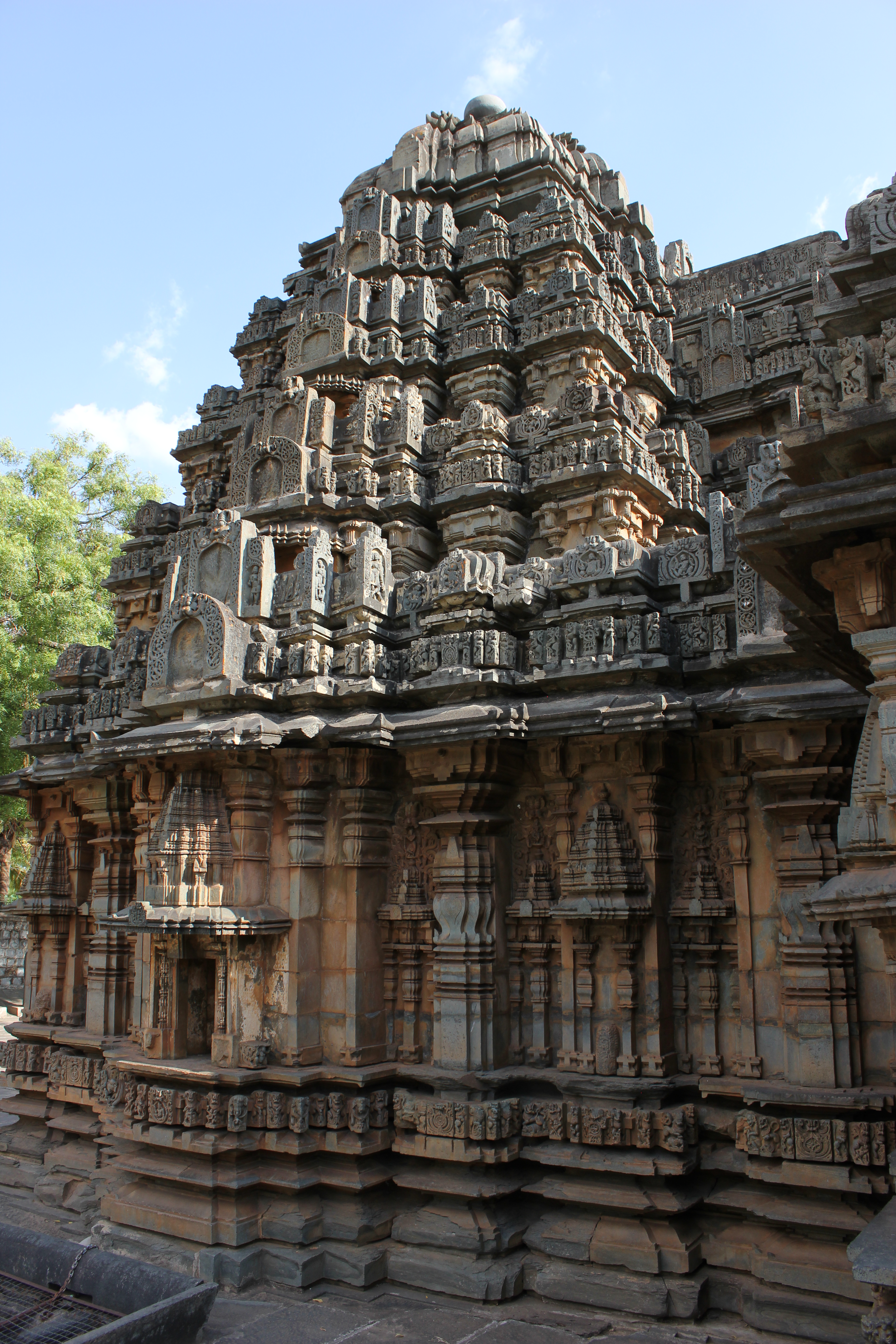
Profile of shrine outer wall and dravida style superstructure (shikhara) at Siddhesvara temple

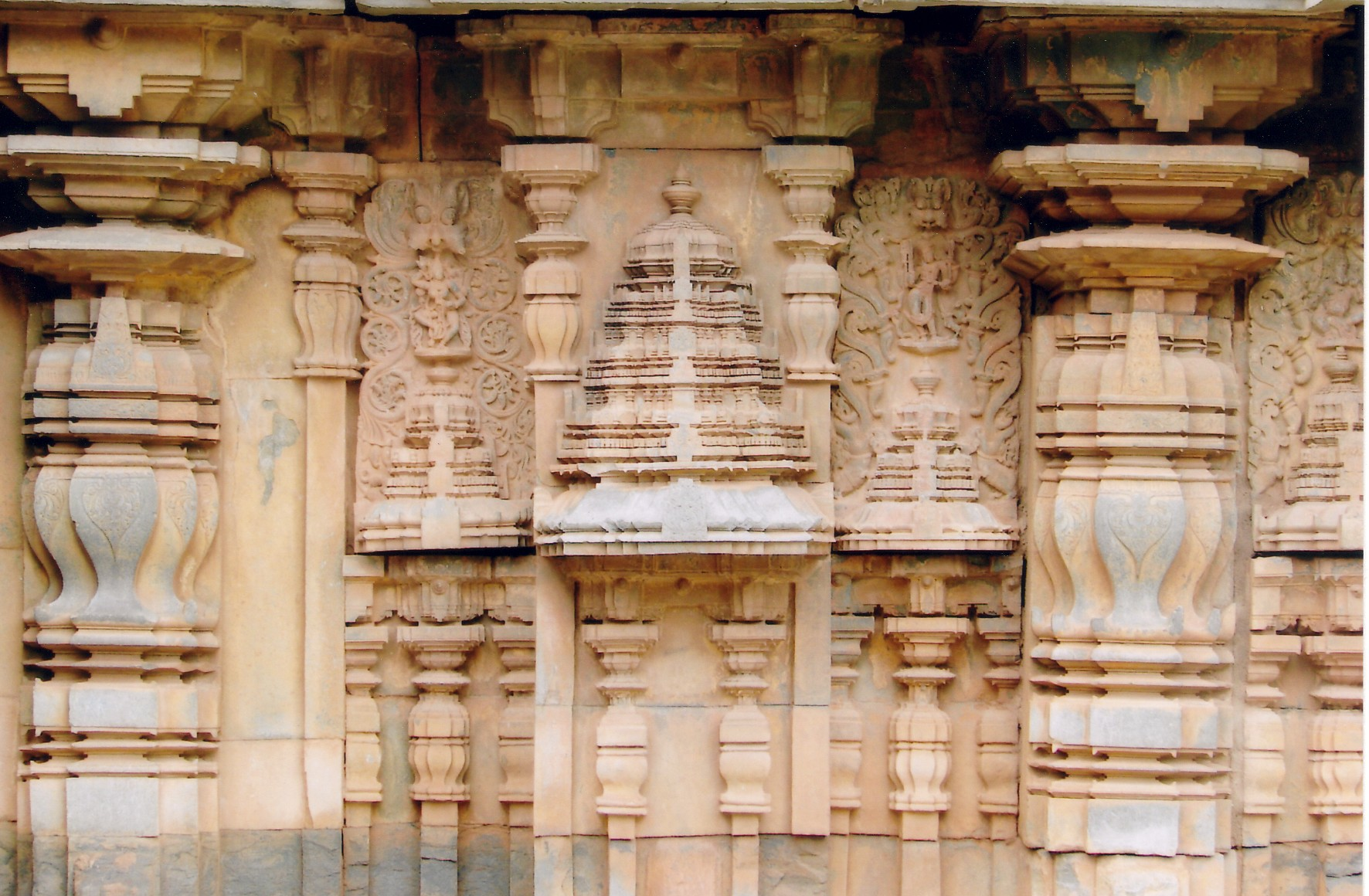
Wall sculpture in relief includes aedicules on pilasters and Kirtimukhas

The Siddheshvara temple, built of soapstone, is located at the east end of the town. From inscriptions, Haveri was originally called Nalapuri and was one of the oldest agraharas (a place of learning) in modern Karnataka. A memorandum dated 1067 CE in the town mentions the village's grant to 400 Brahmins. The temple closely resembles a few other Chalukyan temples in the vicinity of Haveri; the Mukteshvara temple at Chavudayyadanapura, the Someshwar temple at Haralahalli and the Siddharameshvara temple at Niralgi. The entire basement of this temple has sunk by a few feet, making it necessary to descend into the open mantapa (hall).

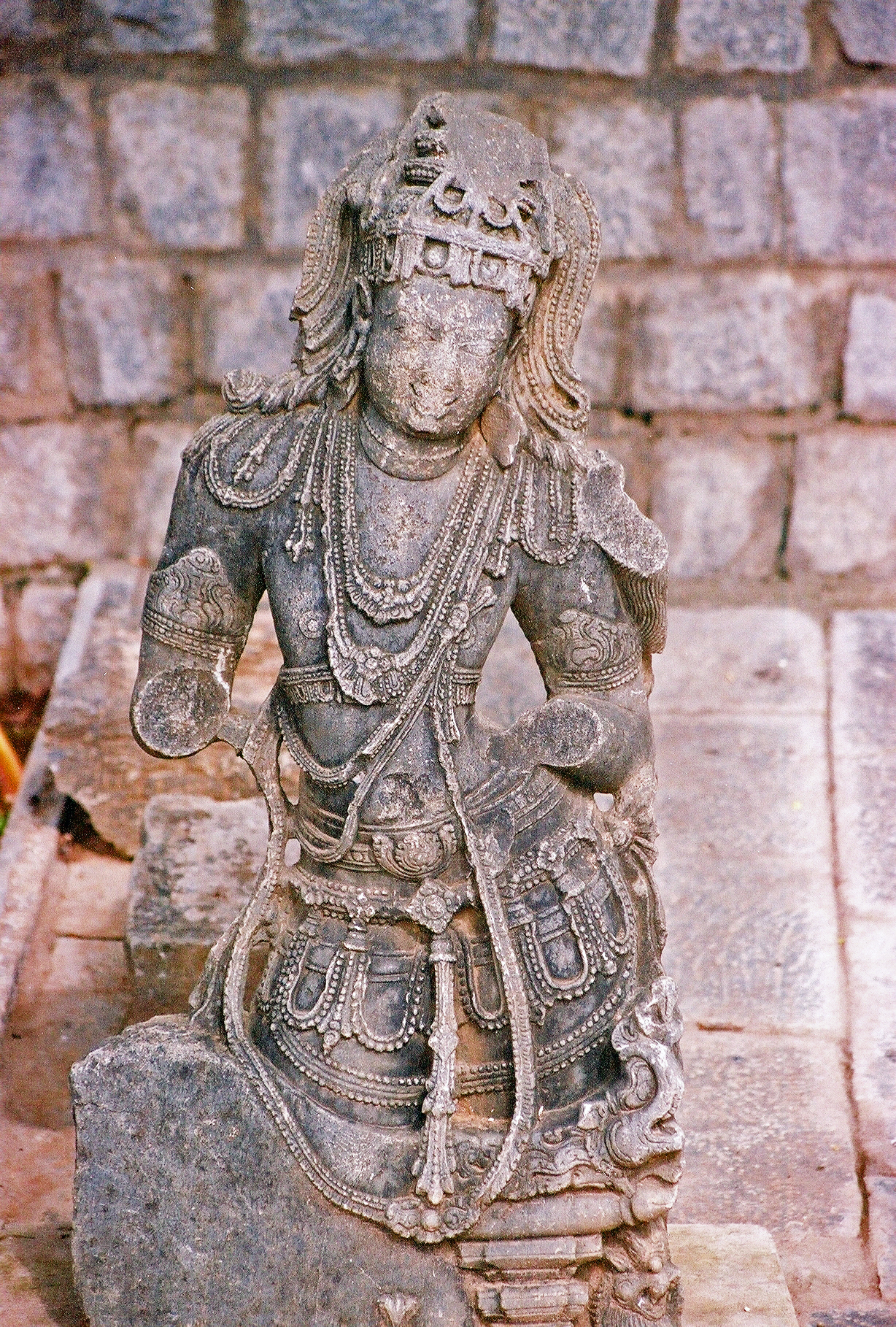
A medieval figure sculpture at the Siddheshvara Temple

The temple may have been consecrated initially as a Vaishnava temple (to the God Vishnu), later taken over by Jains who may have removed some images from the temple and eventually became a Shaiva temple after coming under the procession of the worshippers of God Shiva. This conclusion is drawn because the image of the Sun God Surya exists below the little Kirtimukhas (gargoyle faces) on the temple's eastern wall (back wall). However, a picture of Shiva, sculpted out of an independent slab of stone and mounted in front of the Shikhara (superstructure) above the mantapa roof, would suggest otherwise. Overall, the temple plan bears all the hallmarks of a standard 11th-century Chalukyan construction with Dravida architectural articulation to which some innovative 12th-century elements, such as aedicules, and miniature decorative towers on pilasters, were added.

== Sculptures ==
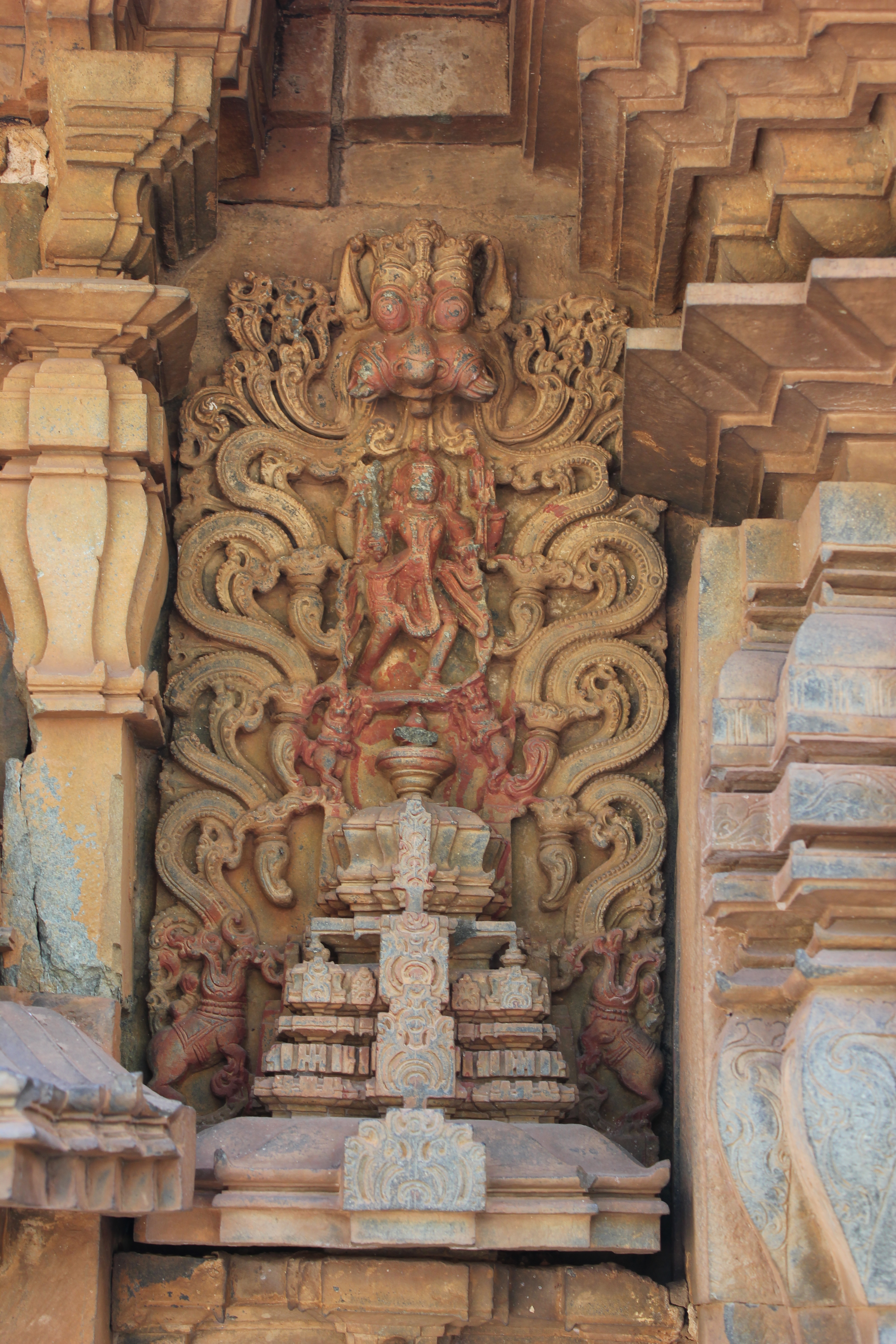
Kirtimukha at the Siddheshvara temple

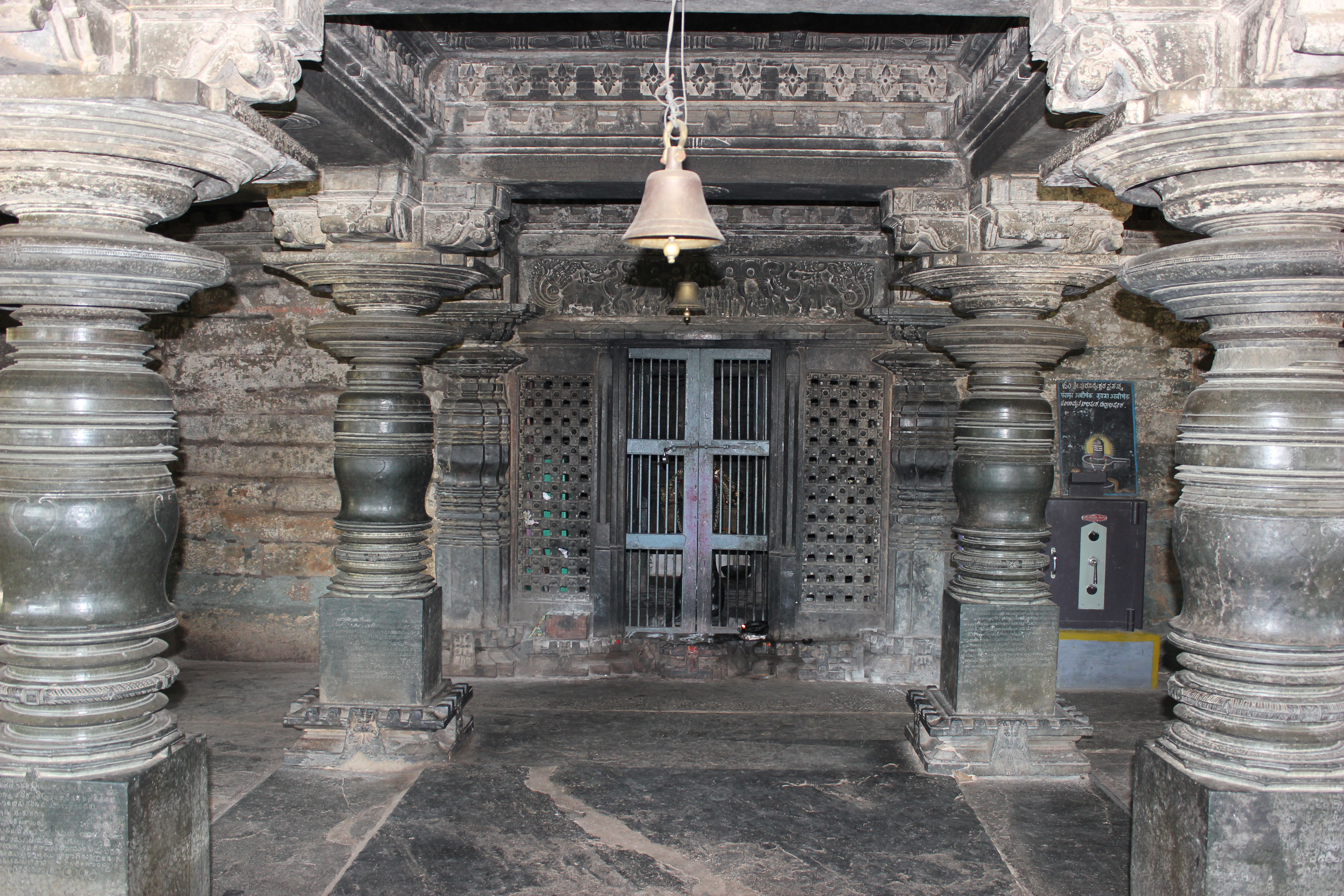
Open mantapa with bay ceiling supported by lathe turned pillars made of soap stone facing the sanctum in the Siddheshvara temple at Haveri

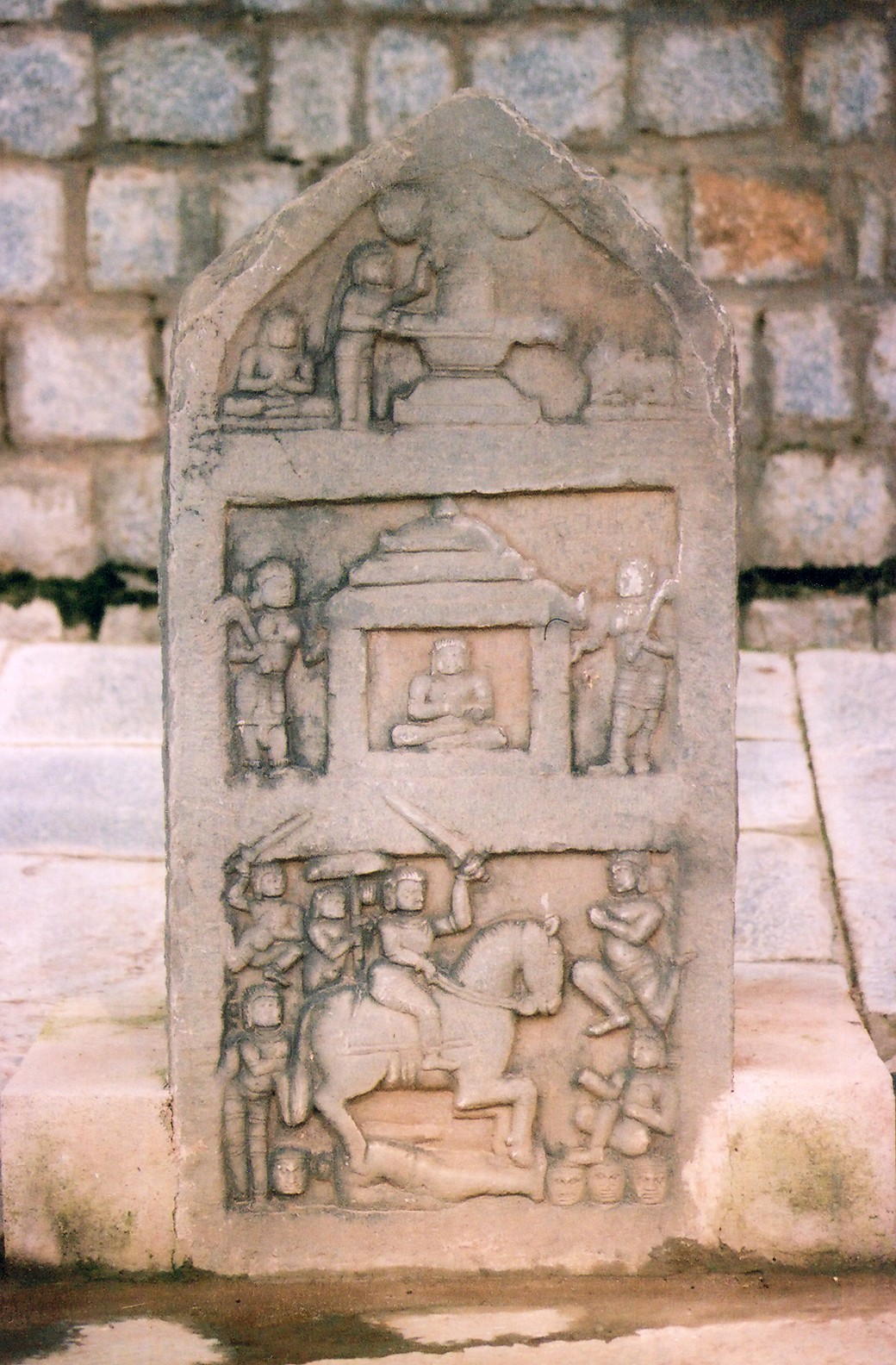
A Hero stone from the Chalukya period

The mantapa (hall) in the temple contains sculptures of Uma Maheshvara (Shiva with his consort Uma), Vishnu and his consort Lakshmi, the Sun God Surya, Nāga-Nagini (the male and female snake goddess), Ganapati and Kartikeya, the sons of Shiva. Shiva is depicted with four arms, holding his attributes: the damaru (drum), the aksamala (chain of beads) and the Trishul (trident) in three arms. His lower left arm rests on Uma, who is seated on Shiva's lap, embracing him with her right arm while gazing into his face. The sculpture of Uma is well decorated with garlands, large earrings and curly hair. With their tails intertwined, the Naga and Nagini appear on the side of the door to the vestibule (antechamber), along with an image of Parvati. A niche depicts a curious male figure with six hands. The two lower hands hold a linga (the symbol of Shiva), and the middle left has a chakra (wheel).

The architrave above the vestibule entrance bears images of Brahma, Shiva and Vishnu, with Shiva in the centre. Ganapati and Kartikeya flank Brahma and Vishnu. On either side of the doorway is a perforated stone worked window, and the main shrine (garbhagriha or cella) has a plain linga (the symbol of Shiva). Some ceiling panels contain images of the saptamatrika ("seven mothers"), while a square column includes photos of the ashtadikpalas ("eight guardians") along with the Hindu trimurthy ("three forms") and Surya. The saptamatrikas are also carved into the wall of a step well outside. The saptamatrika sculptures on friezes have female deities, generally, each with a child on the lap to denote motherhood and are identified by the vahana (vehicle) of their male counterpart found under them. At one end of the frieze is Shiva, and at the other is Ganapati. Next to Shiva are the Matrika ("mother") goddesses: Brahmi (or Brahmani), Brahma's consort, with a goose; Maheshvari, the consort of Shiva, has a Nandi (bull); Vaishnavi, the consort of Vishnu has a Garuda (eagle); Kaumari, the consort of Kartikeya has a peacock; Varahi, the consort of Varaha, has a buffalo (instead of a boar); Indrani, the consort of Indra, has an elephant; and the last "mother" could be a skeletal image of Chamunda with a dog or could be a dead body. Other loose sculptures in niches worthy of mention are those of Surya, canopied by a seven-hooded snake, and the Mahishasuramardini (a form of Durga). Within the temple premises are several old-Kannada inscriptions recording grants, the earliest inscribed on a beam inside the temple and dated to 1087 CE, while another stone inscription (shilashasana) dated to 1108 CE stands outside.

== Gallery ==
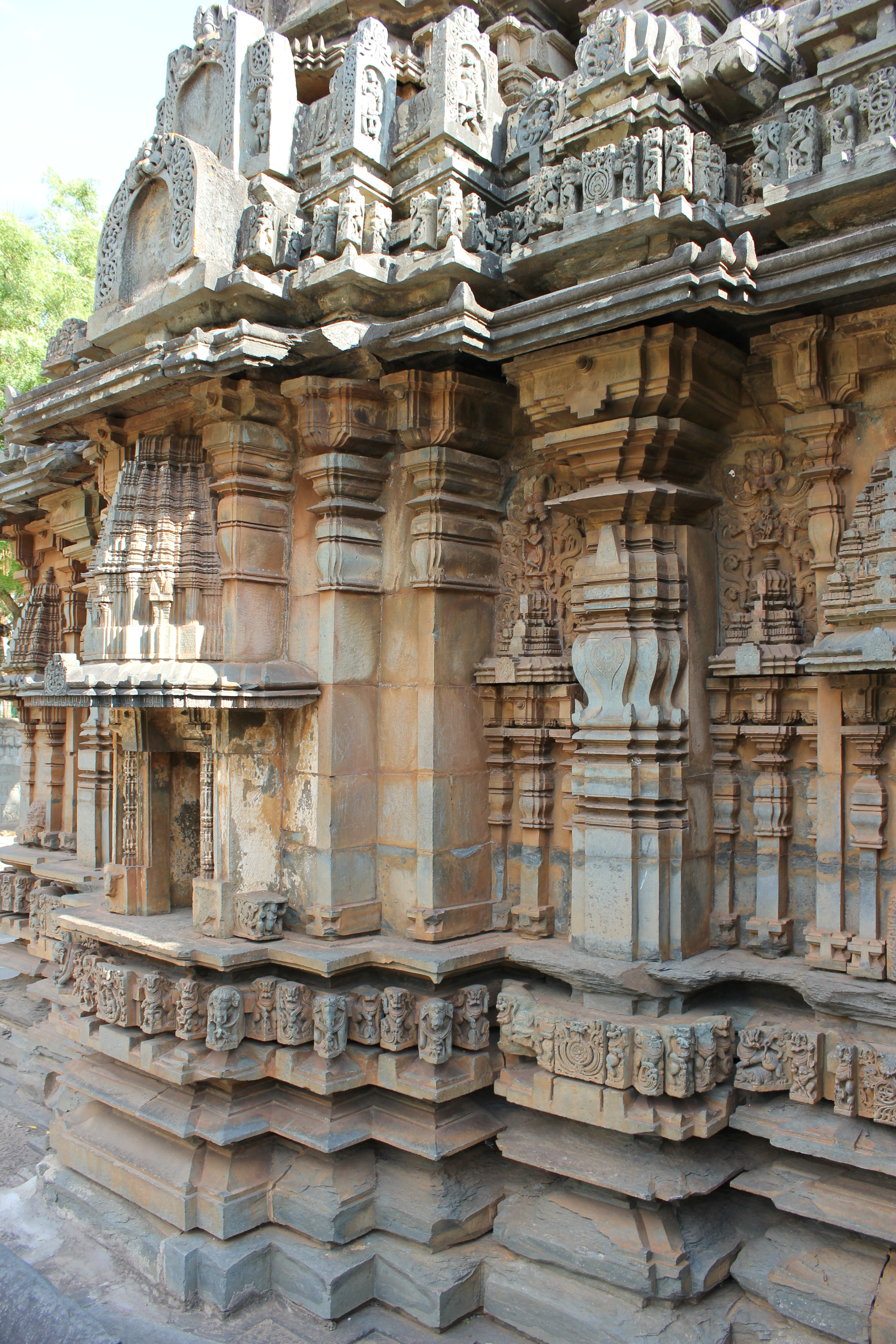
Outerwall decorative relief in the Siddheshvara temple at Haveri

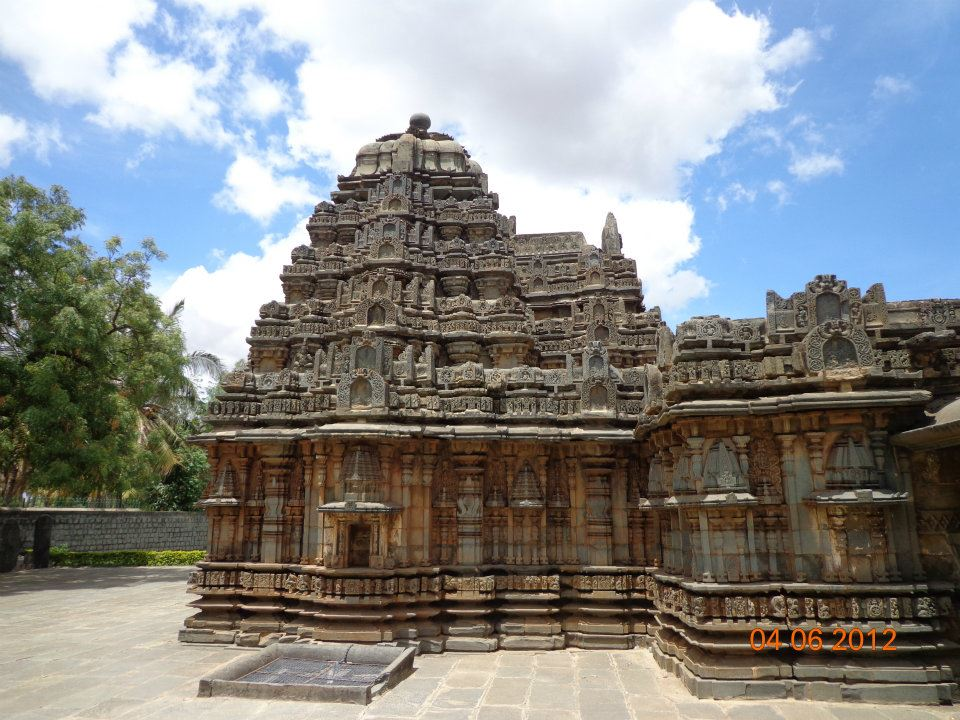
Lateral view of the Siddheshvara temple at Haveri

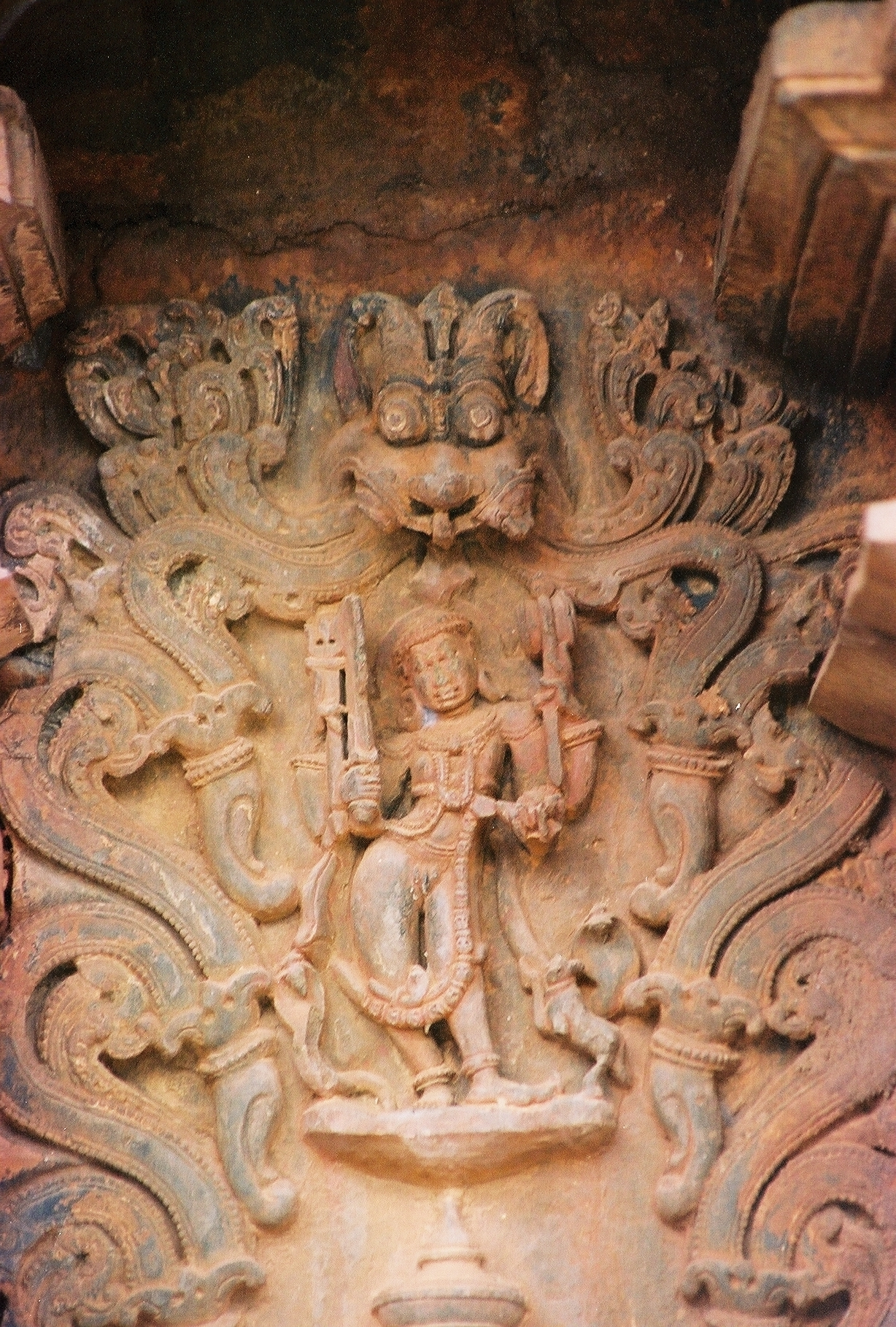
Kirthimukha sculpture in Siddheshvara Temple at Haveri

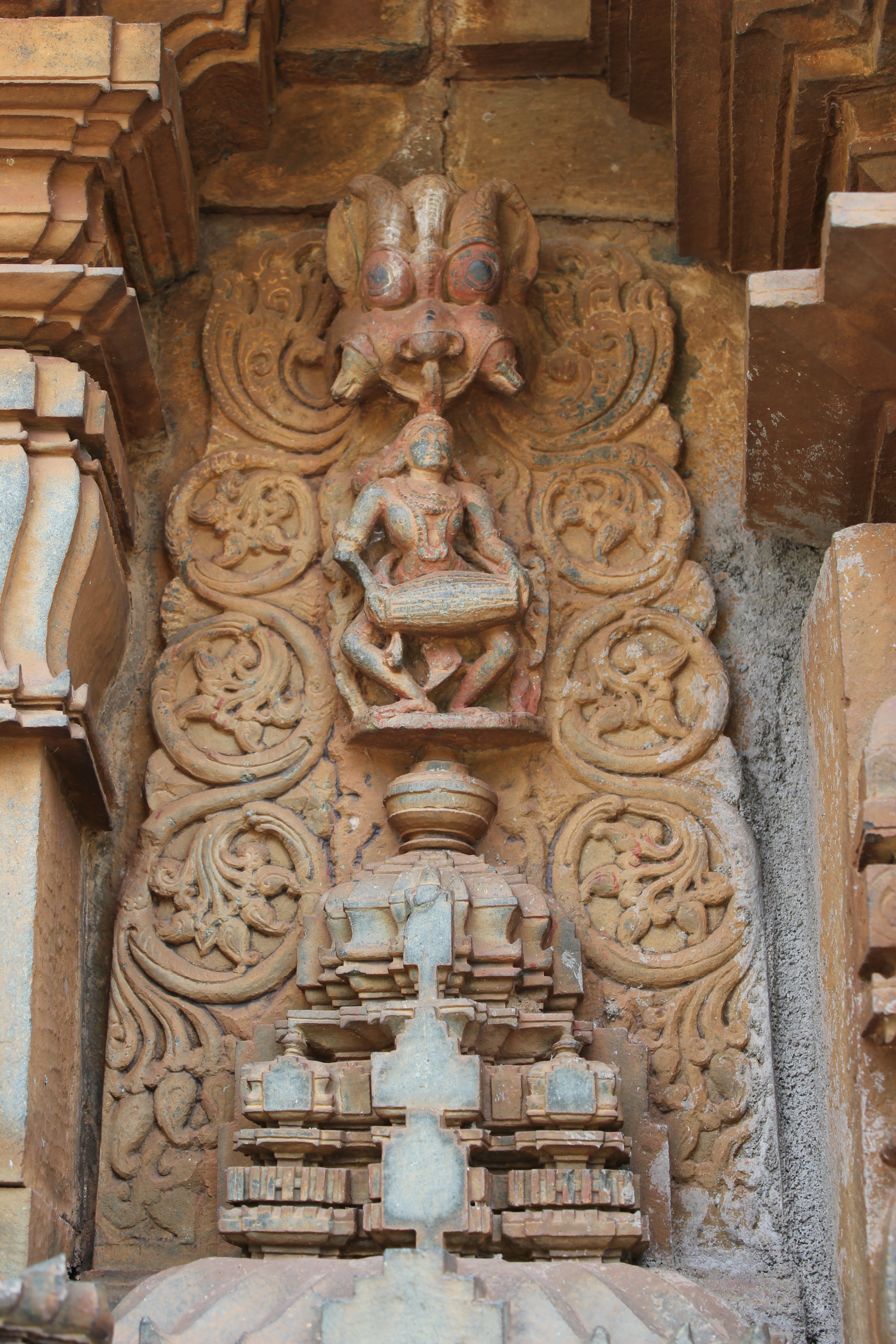
Kirtimukha relief on outerwall of Siddheshvara temple at Haveri

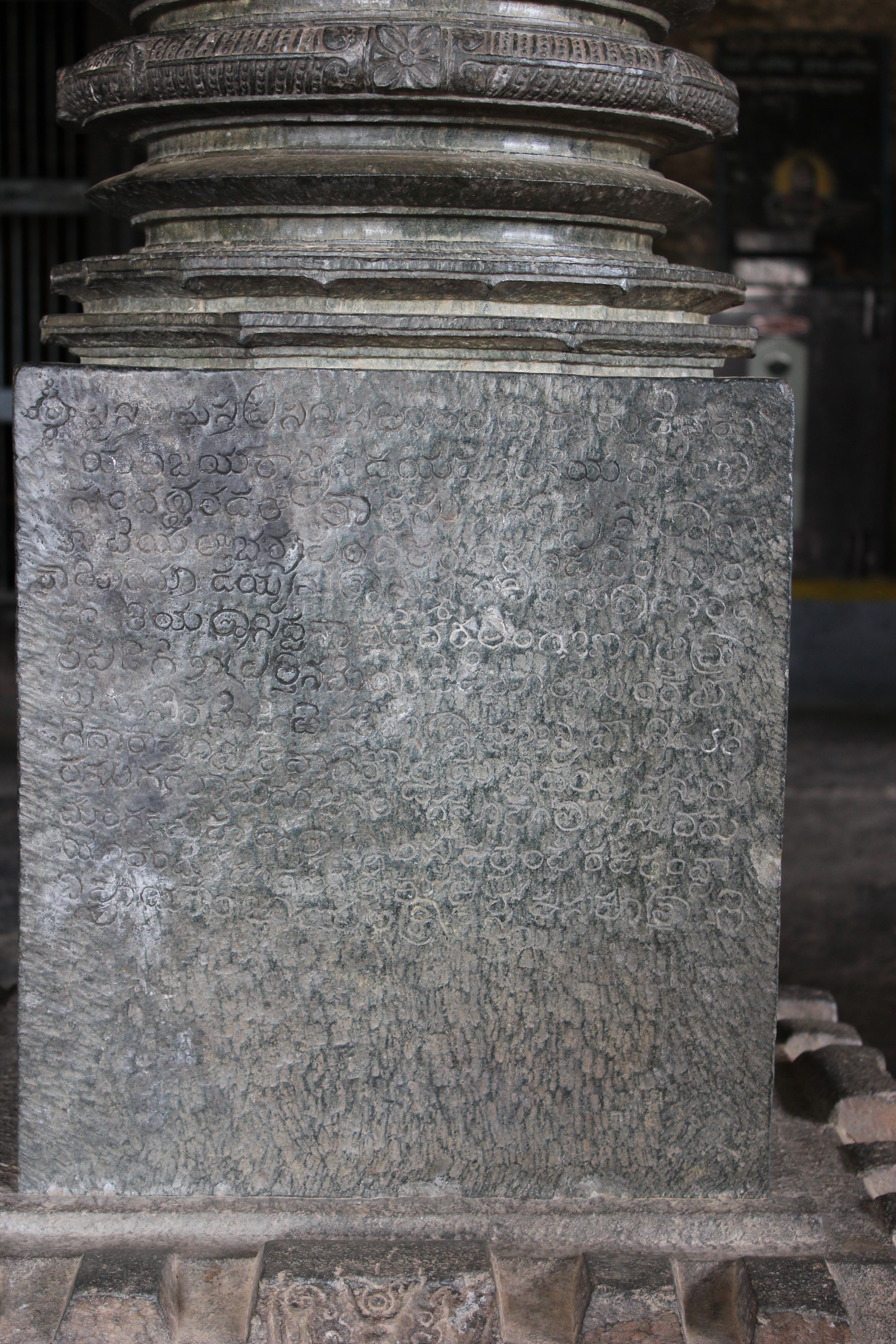
Old Kannada inscription (13th century) of the Seuna Yadava kingdom on pillar base in the Siddheshvara temple at Haveri

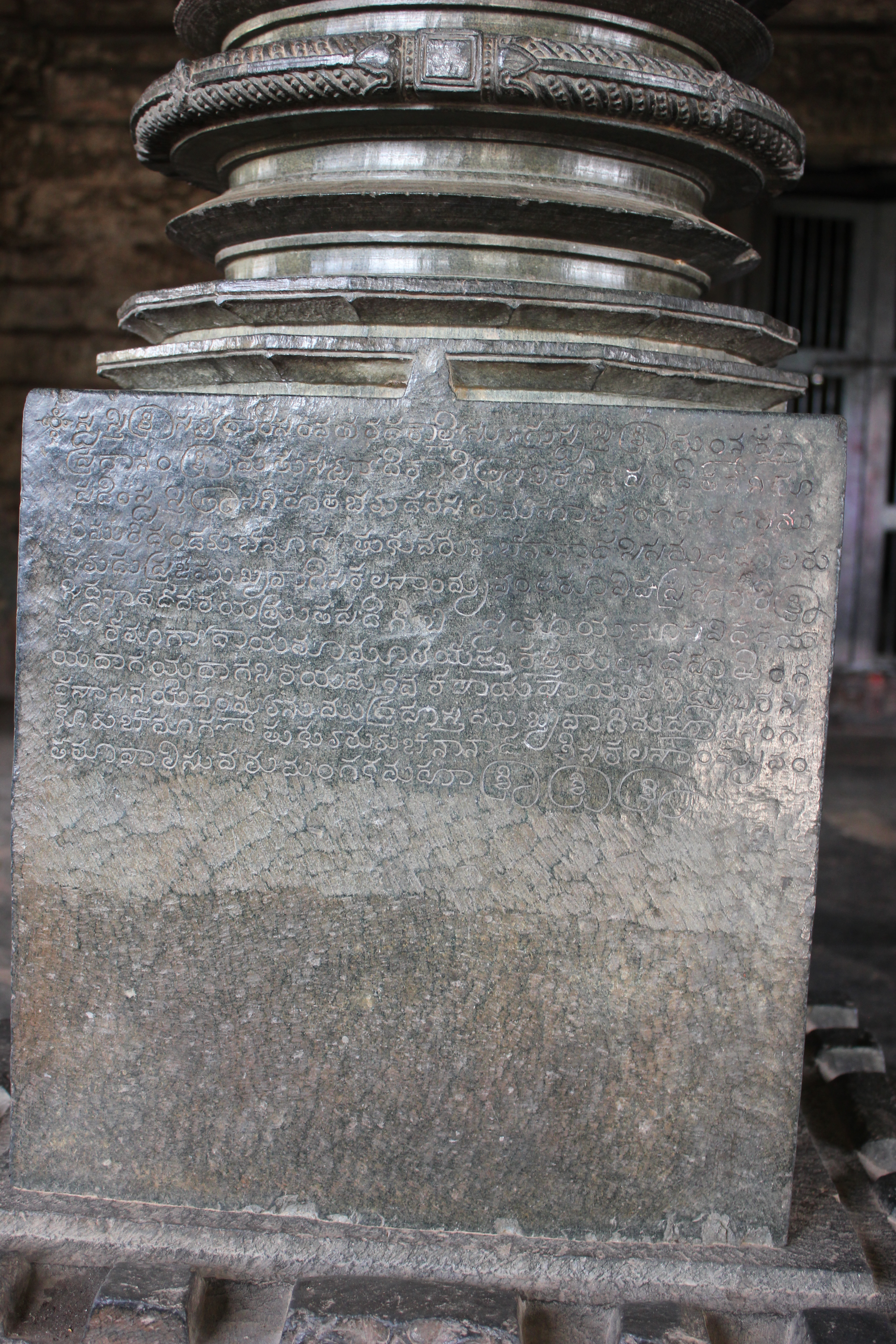
Old Kannada inscription (13th century) of the Seuna Yadava kingdom on pillar base in the Siddheshvara temple at Haveri

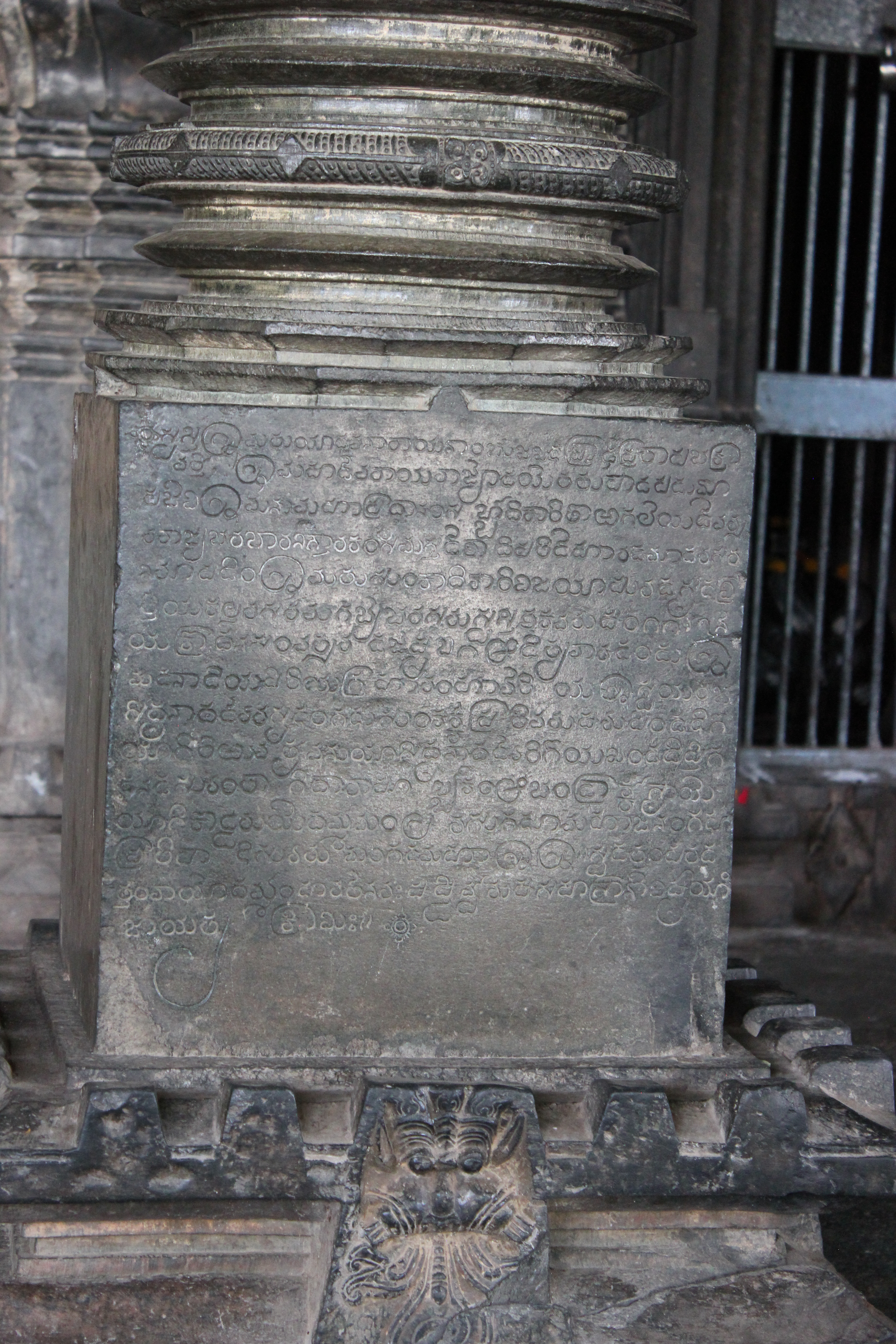
Old Kannada inscription (13th century) of the Seuna Yadava kingdom on pillar base in the Siddheshvara temple at Haveri
