= Galaganatha =

Galaganath
- village
- Karnataka, India Galaganath (India)
- Coordinates: 14°55′10″N 75°40′52″E
- Country: India
- State: Karnataka
- District: Haveri
- Taluk: Haveri
- Lok Sabha Constituency: Haveri

Languages
  - Official: Kannada
- Time zone: UTC+5:30 (IST)
- ISO 3166 code: IN-KA
- Vehicle registration: KA-27
- Nearest city: Ranebennur
- Website: karnataka.gov.in

Galaganath is a small village located near Haveri, in the Haveri District, Karnataka. Located here is the famous Galageshwar Shiva Temple built during the rule of the Western Chalukyas. This large temple faces east and is situated along the Tungabhadra River. The rivers Tunga and Varada join at Galaganath.

== History ==
Galaganath was formerly known as Palluni. The Galageshwar temple, an example of the Chalukya style of architecture, was built here around the 11th century. Sri Venkatesh Galaganath (Kadambari Pitamaha) worshiped at the Galageshwar temple, and he wrote his novels on the temple premises.

== Galageshwar temple ==
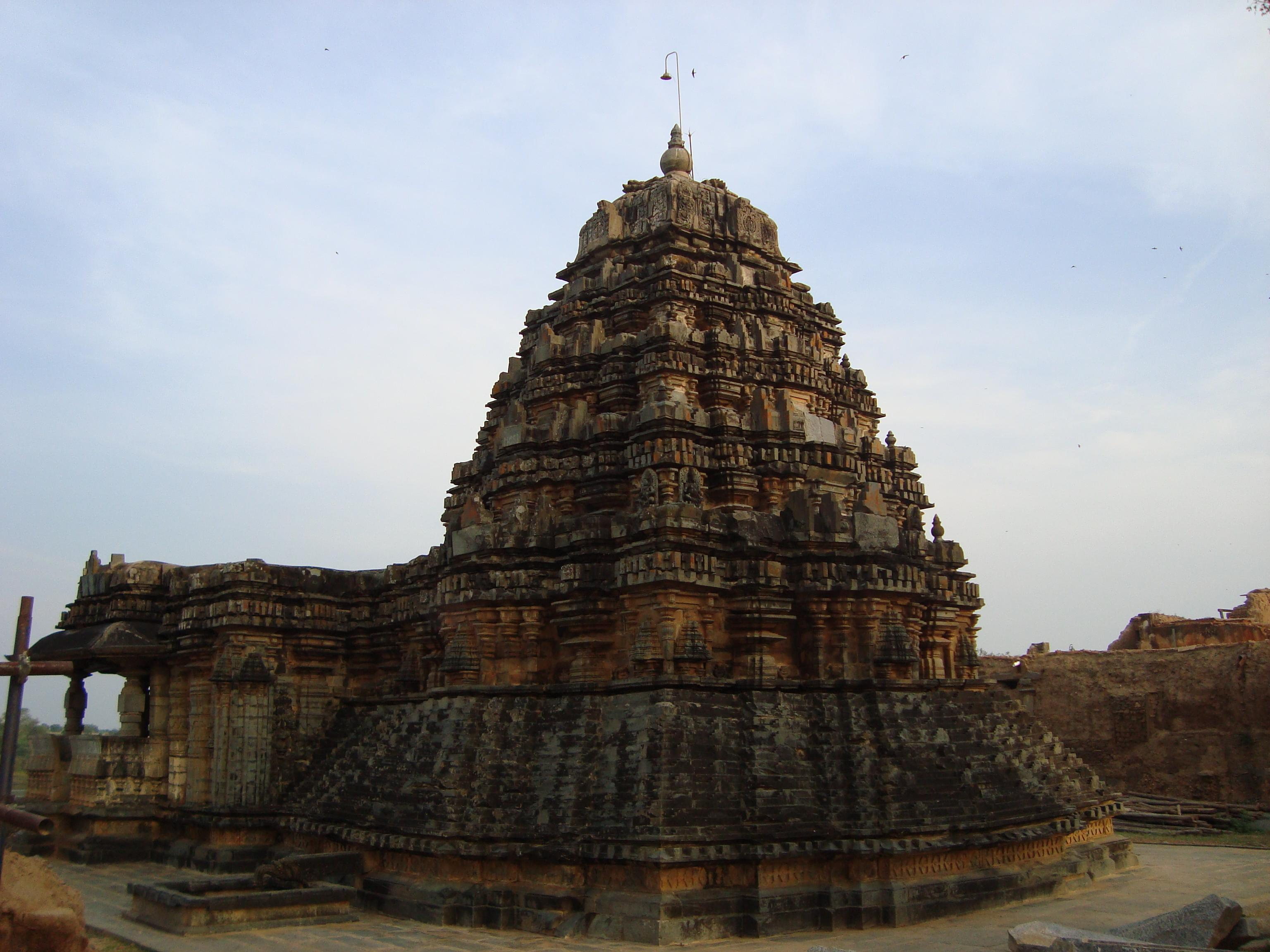
Galageshwar Temple at Galaganath

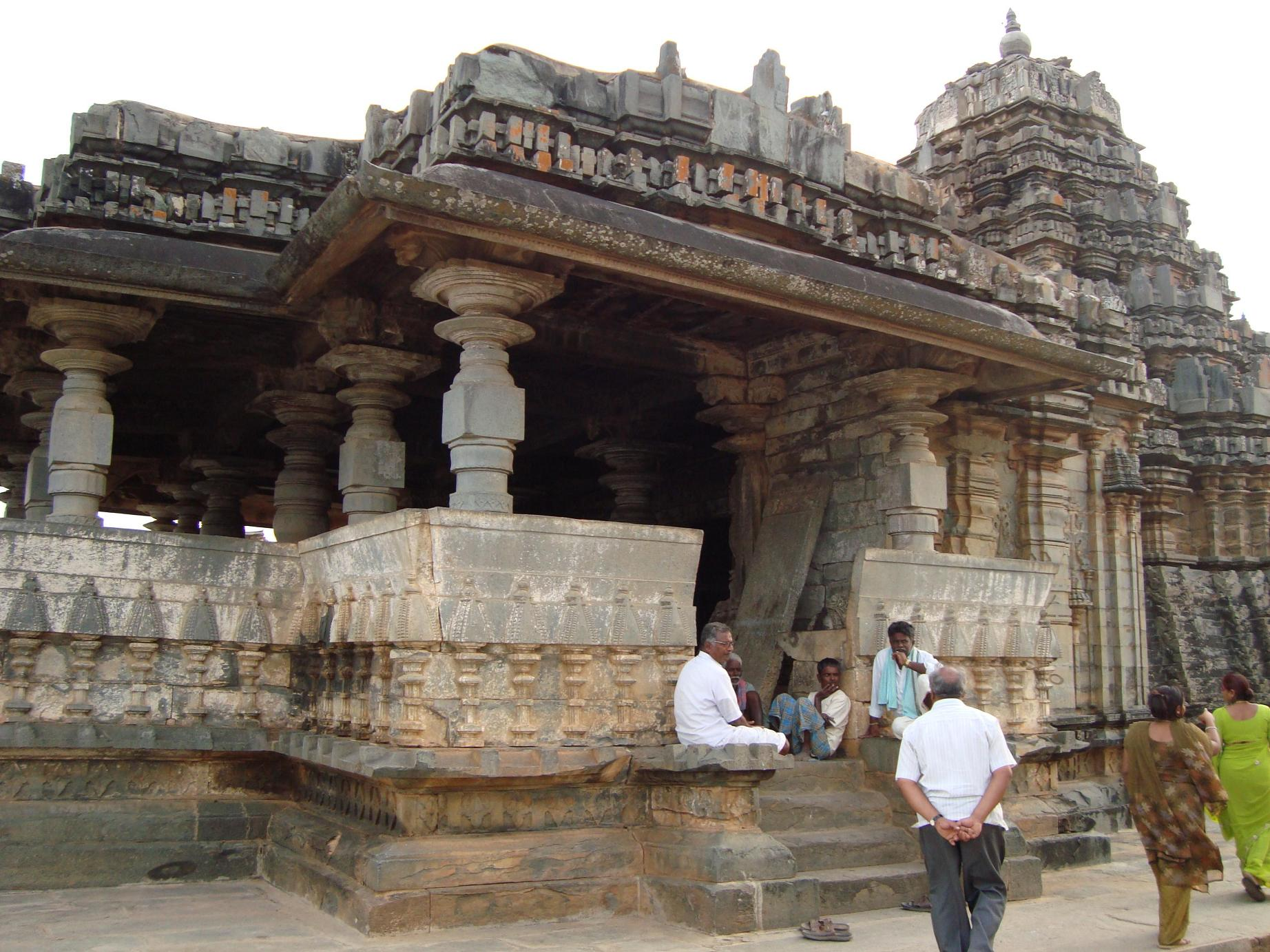
Galageshwar Temple at Galaganath

The temple faces to east and it is situated along the Tungabhadra river. the temple consists of a huge Shiva Linga in a closed hall; it is called Sparsha linga. The temple has an unusual pyramidal basement and a large open hall. The Gopura (tower) is decorated with plain architectural elements while the wall panels of the back of the hall have some fine decorations. The interior has numerous niches containing figural sculpture including Ganesha.

== Inscriptions ==
A large inscription slab in the open hall of Galageshwar temple dates from 1080 AD and records a grant to the God Galageshwar. The date gives an indication of the era when the temple was built.

The inscription here informs about the prevalence of the tradition of dance and music. The high state of development which the art of music had reached in the 11th century A.D. can be gathered from an inscription of Chalukya king Vikramaditya from Galaganath, Haveri Taluk and Haveri District, North Karnataka, which mentions a certain Mokhari Barmmayya, a musician of high order, titled Battisaraga-bahu-kala-Brahma meaning skilled in 32 ragas.

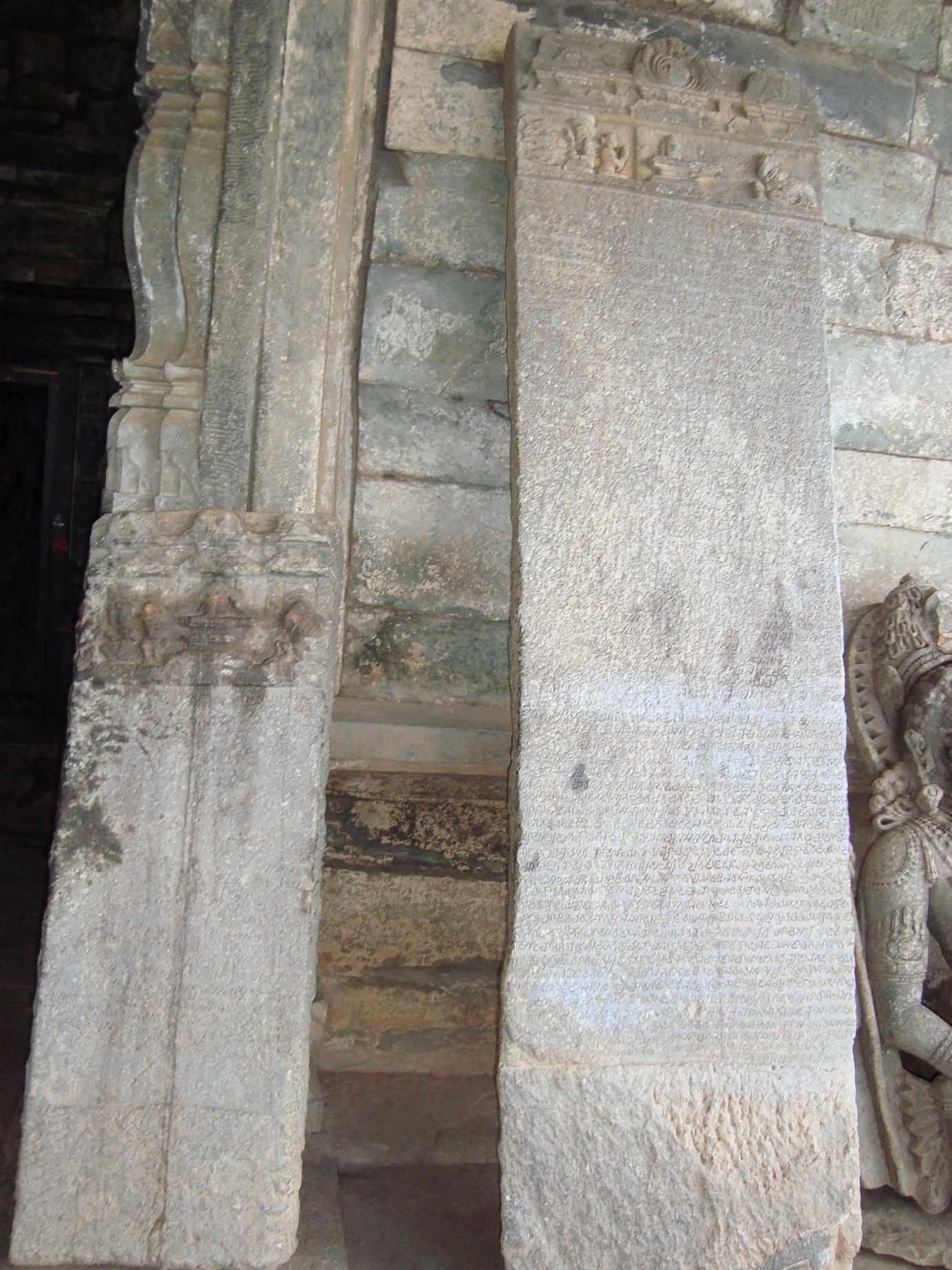
Inscription in Kannada, Galageshwara Temple

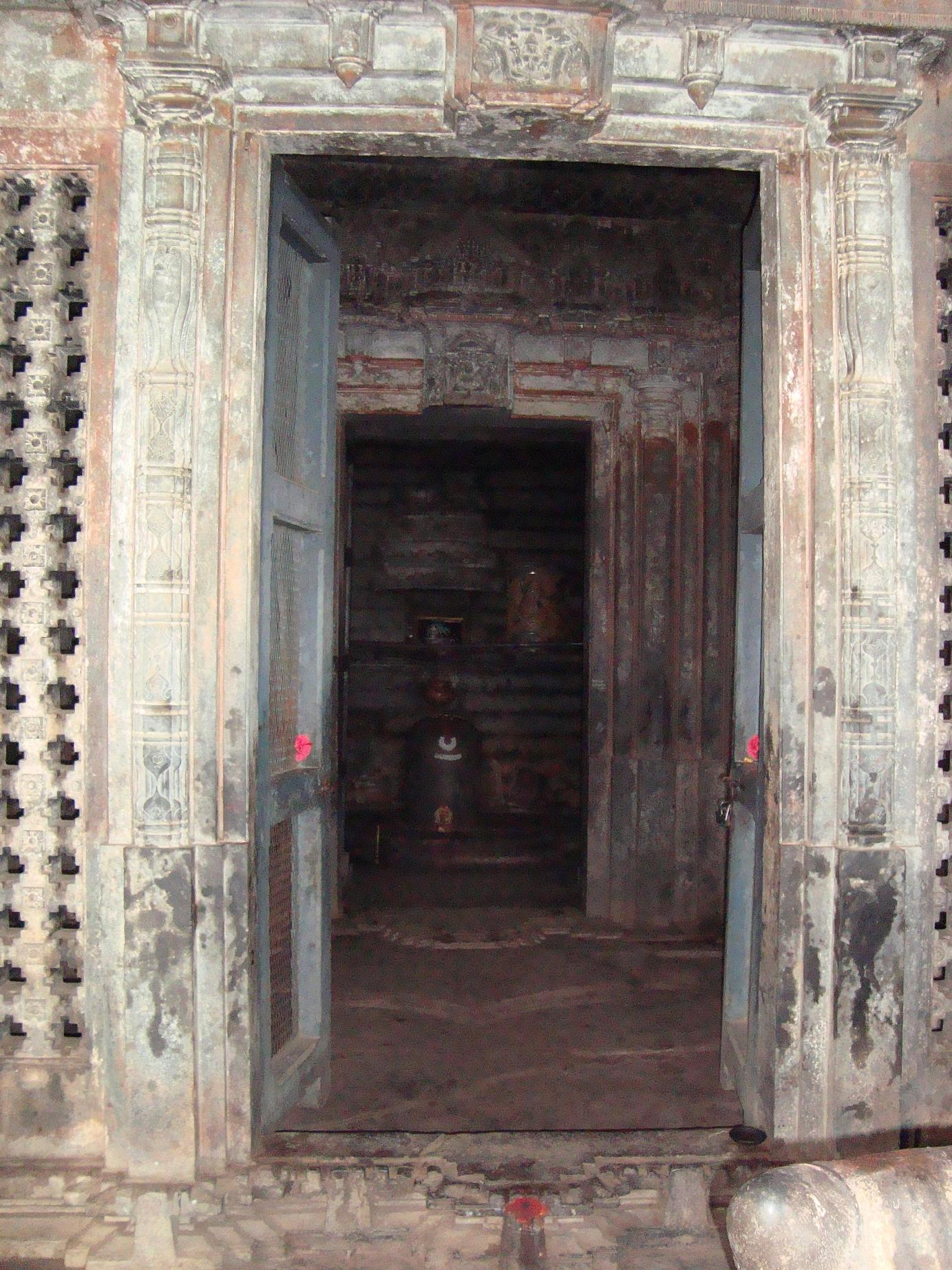
Shivalinga, Galageshwar Temple

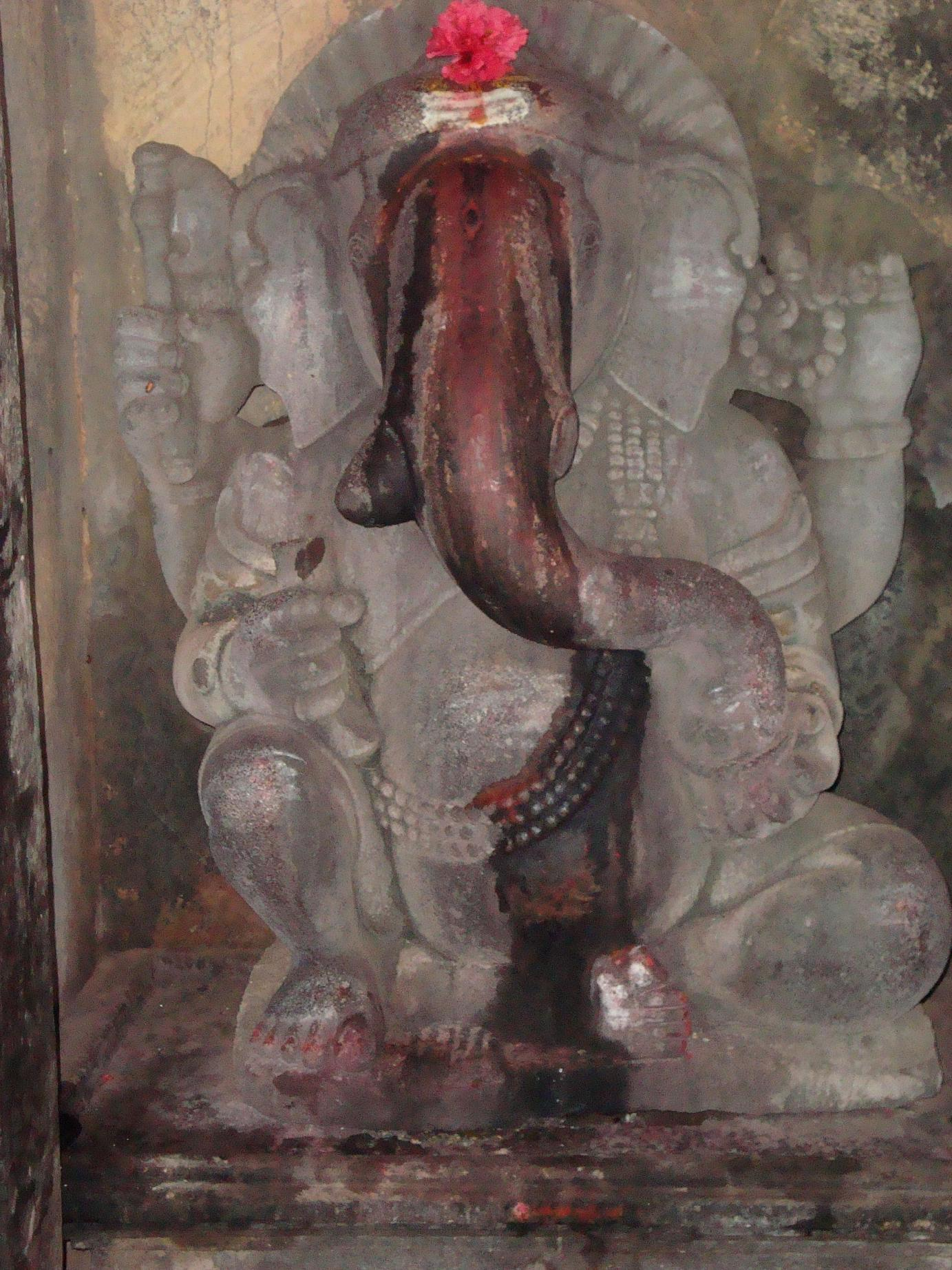
Ganesh, Galageshwara Temple

== Also visit ==
- North Karnataka
- Tourism in North Karnataka
- Ranebennur
- Haveri
- Chaudayyadanapur
- Mylar Lingeshwar Temple at Mylar
- Hangal
- Bankapur
- Kaginele
