= Motebennur =

- village
- Location in Karnataka, India Motebennur (India)
- Coordinates: 14.715°N 75.48°E
- Country: India
- State: Karnataka
- District: Haveri

Government
  - Body: Gram panchayat

Area
  - Total: 31.132 km^{2} (12.020 sq mi)
- Elevation: 632 m (2,073 ft)

Population (2011)
  - Total: 8,305
  - Density: 266.8/km^{2} (690.9/sq mi)

Languages
  - Official: Kannada
- Time zone: UTC+5:30 (IST)
- PIN: 581 198
- Telephone code: 08375
- ISO 3166 code: IN-KA
- Vehicle registration: KA-68
- Nearest city: Haveri
- Lok Sabha constituency: Haveri
- Vidhan Sabha constituency: Byadgi
- Website: karnataka.gov.in

Motebennur is one of the villages in Haveri district of the state of Karnataka, India. It is the largest village in Byadagi Taluk. It is about 10 km south from Haveri city by NH-48. Local language is Kannada.

== Geography ==
It has an average elevation of 632 metres. It is in the Bayaluseeme region of karnataka.Maize and Groundnut are grown in this village.

== Transportation ==
The town is well connected by roads to district headquarter Haveri, Bangalore, Hubli and Belgaum by NH-48 road which passes through the town.It is also connected by state highway 136 to Byadgi.The nearest railway station is Byadgi railway station which is 2.5 from the village.

== Legacy of Freedom fighters ==
This village have given birth to one of the popular freedom fighters Mailara Mahadevappa who took part in Uppina Satyagraha.

Motebennur have given birth to a famous poet Mahadev Banakar. This village also have a historic Church called 'C.S.I.Shanti Church built by British before independence.
