= Mailara Mahadevappa =

Indian freedom fighter

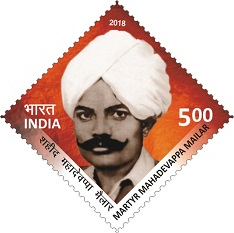
Mailara Mahadevappa on a 2018 stamp of India

Mailara Mahadevappa (8 June 1911 – 1 April 1943), also known as Mahadeva, from Motebennur of Karnataka state, India, was an Indian revolutionary, known for resisting British rule. Martandapp alias Martand and Basamma are his parents. At the age of 18, he accompanied Mahatma Gandhi on the Dandi March, as the only representative from Karnataka.

In 2018, he was depicted on a stamp issued by Indian Post, and a Memorial Trust is named in his honor. Mailara Mahadevappa participated in noncooperation movement call given by Mahatma Gandhi and he was killed by the police on 1 April 1943, along with his followers Tirakappa Madivalar and Veerayya Hiremath while breaking open the treasury where colonial officials had kept the land revenue in Hosaritti Village Veerabhadra Swamy Temple by collecting forcefully from farmers. Mahadev Mailar use to collect back Land Revenue and redistribute it to the concerned farmers.
