= Yalavagi =

Yalvigi
- village
- Location within Karnataka
- Coordinates: 15°3′47″N 75°28′0.1″E
- Country: India
- State: Havei Karnataka

Yalavagi is a village in savanur taluk Haveri district, India.

Yalavagi village is Railway station Stoppage to Connecting the Laxmeshwar Town [13;Km] And Gadag[53;Km]. Famous Doctor Manjunath Naik born in yalavigi village.
