= Haveri district =

Haveri district The Heart of Karnataka
- District of Karnataka
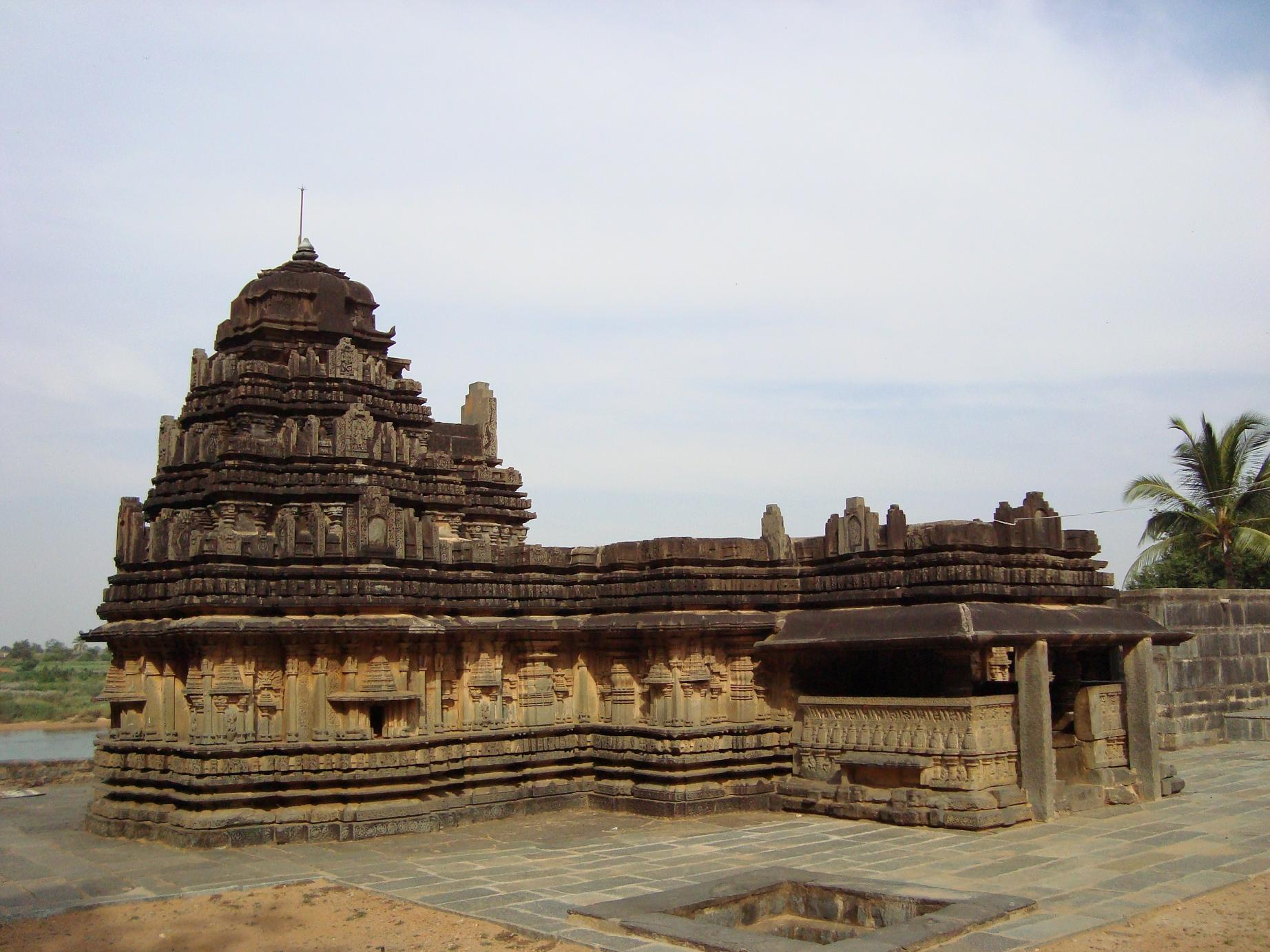
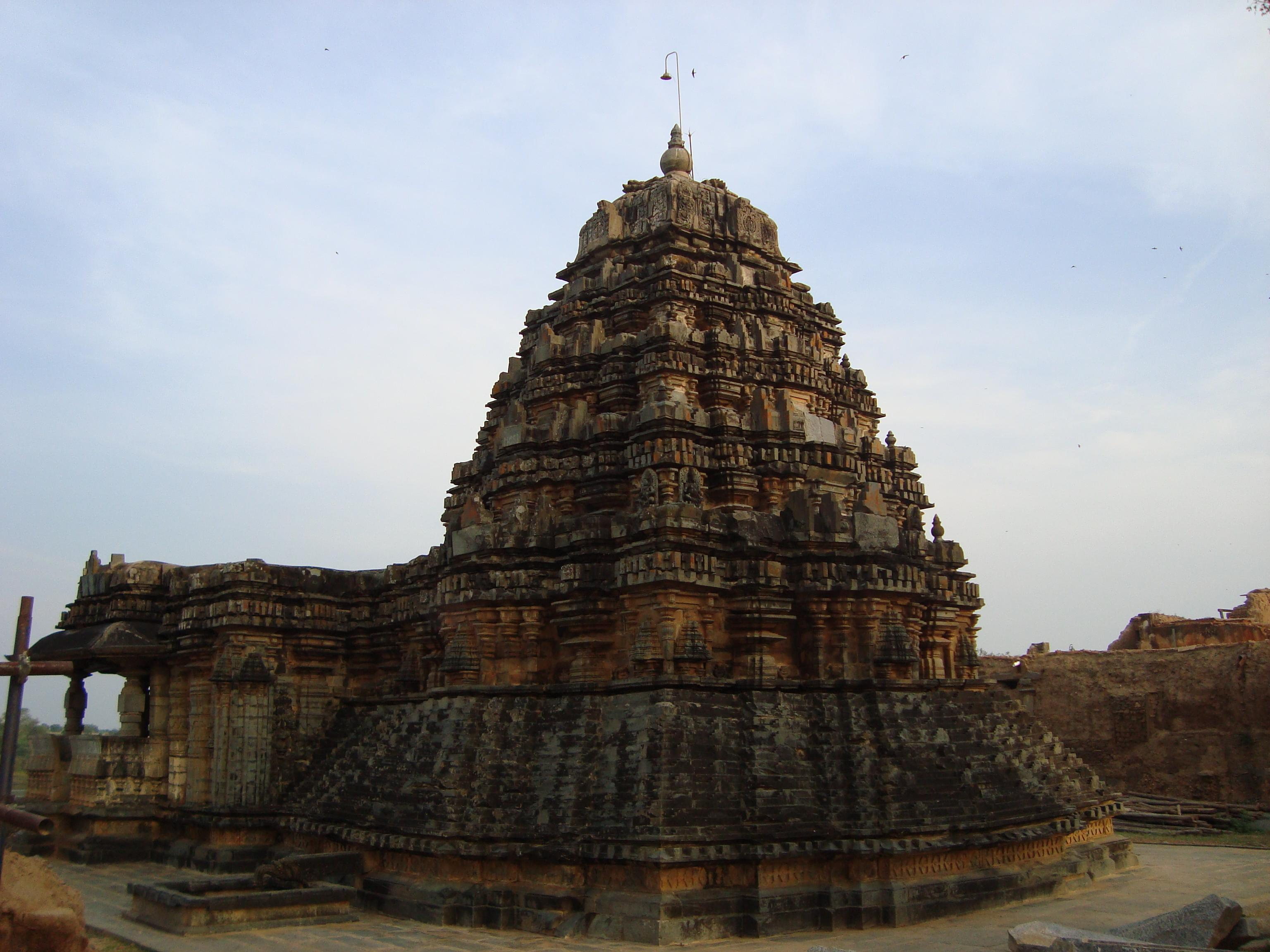
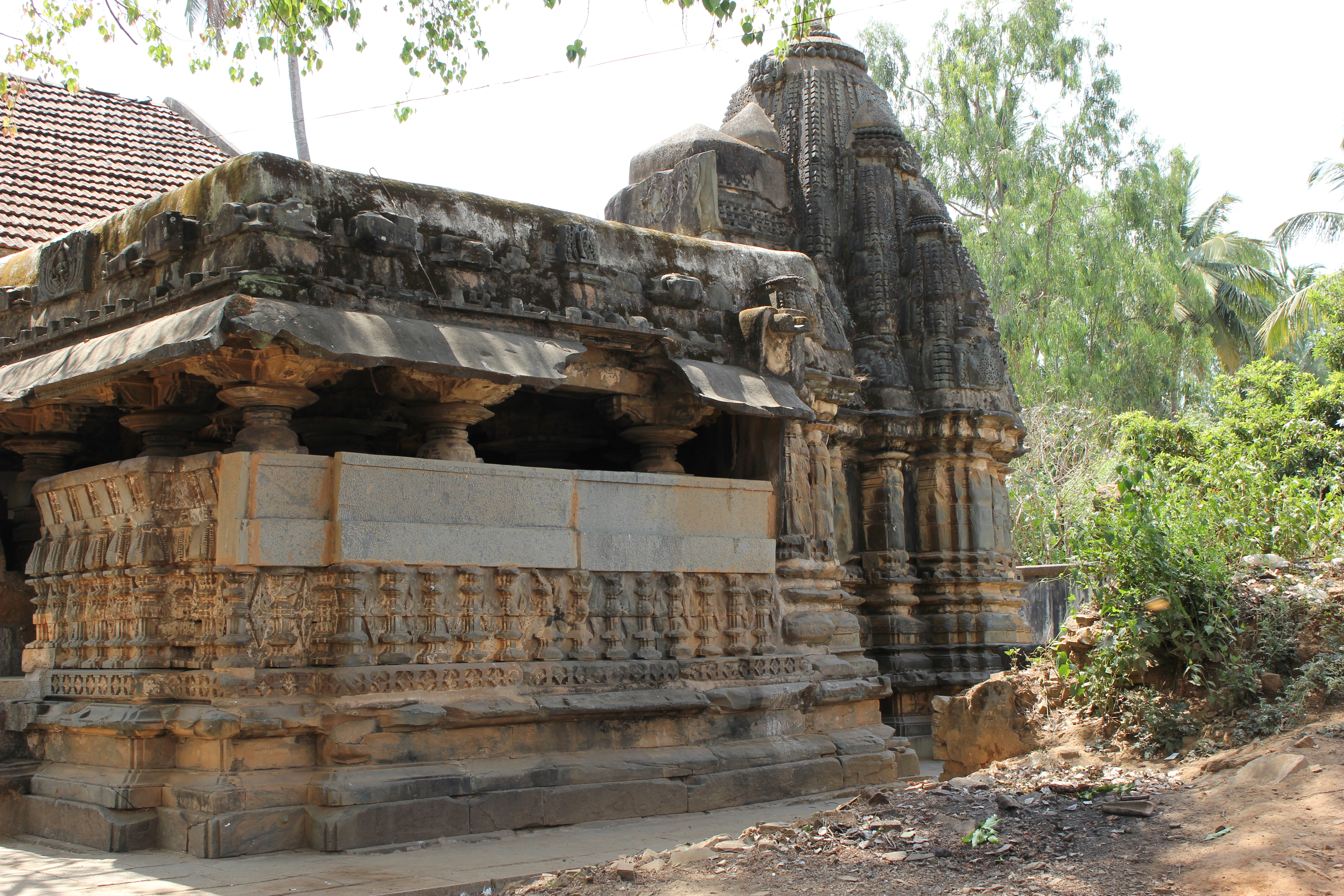
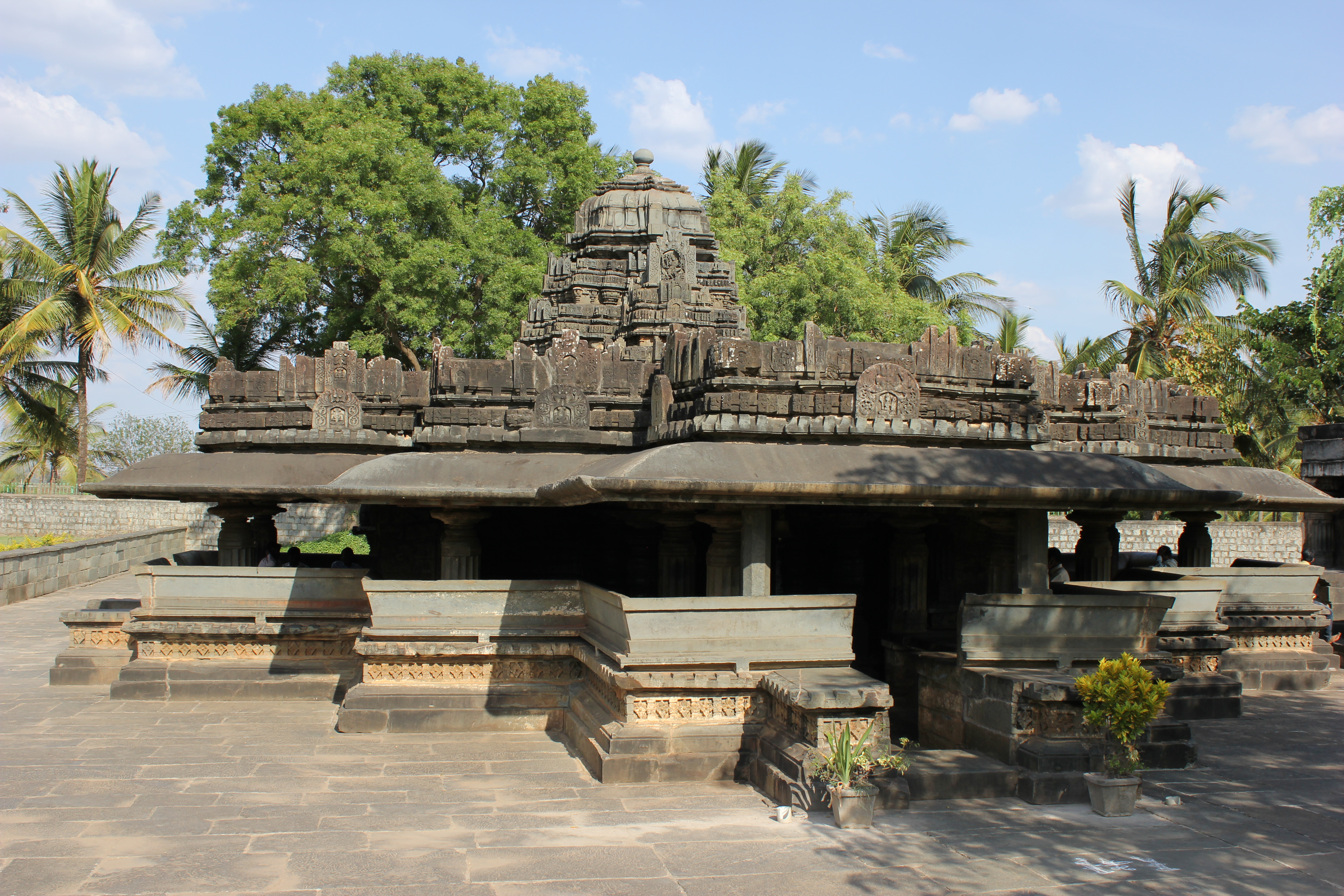
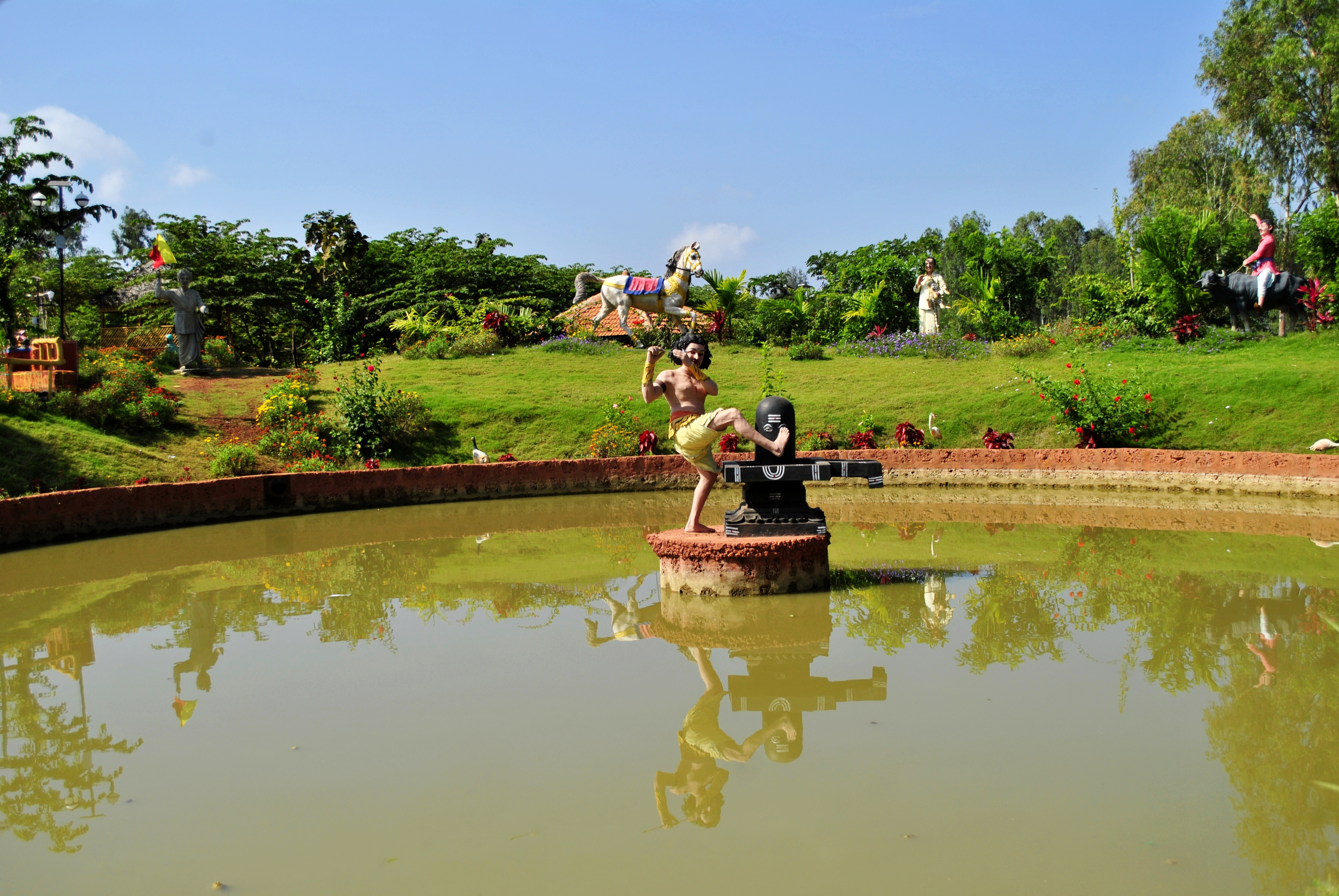
- Clockwise from top-right: Galageshwara Temple at Galaganatha, Siddhesvara Temple in Haveri, Rajkumar circle in Utsav Rock Garden, Tarakeshwara Temple at Hanagal, Chaudayyadanapura Mukteshwara temple in Ranebennur
- Nicknames: Ranebennur=Asia's 1st Seeds Production Centre Byadagi= Asia's Red chilies Market Haveri=Land of Cardamom Shiggaon & Savanur=Sufi, Santhara Naadu Hirekerur=Land of Sarvagna Hanagal= Land of Malenaadu
- Interactive map of Haveri district
- Coordinates: 14.8°N 75.4°E
- Country: India
- State: Karnataka
- Division: Kittur Karnataka
- Established: August 24, 1997
- Headquarters: Haveri
- Commercial office: Ranebennur
- Taluks: Byadgi; Haveri; Hangal; Hirekerur; Shiggaon; Savanur; Rattihalli; Ranebennur

Government
  - Deputy Commissioner: Vijaymahantesh Danammanavar

Area
  - Total: 4,823 km^{2} (1,862 sq mi)
  - Rank: 18

Population (2011)
  - Total: 1,597,668
  - Density: 331.3/km^{2} (858.0/sq mi)

Languages
  - Official: Kannada
- Time zone: UTC+5:30 (IST)
- PIN: (581110) Haveri (581115) Ranebennur
- Telephone code: (08375) Haveri (08373)Ranebennur
- ISO 3166 code: IN-KA
- Vehicle registration: KA-27 Haveri; KA-68 Ranebennur
- Website: haveri.nic.in

Haveri district is a district in the state of Karnataka, India. As of 2011, it had a population of 1,597,668, out of which 20.78% were urban residents. The district headquarters is Haveri. Ranebennur is the biggest city in Haveri district with population and the commercial city and business headquarters and seeds production hub.

Name of the place Haveri is derived from two Kannada words "Havu" which means snake and "keri" which means lake or Village/Locality so people called it "Havu-keri" meaning "Village of snakes.

== History ==
Core area of Western Chalukya monuments

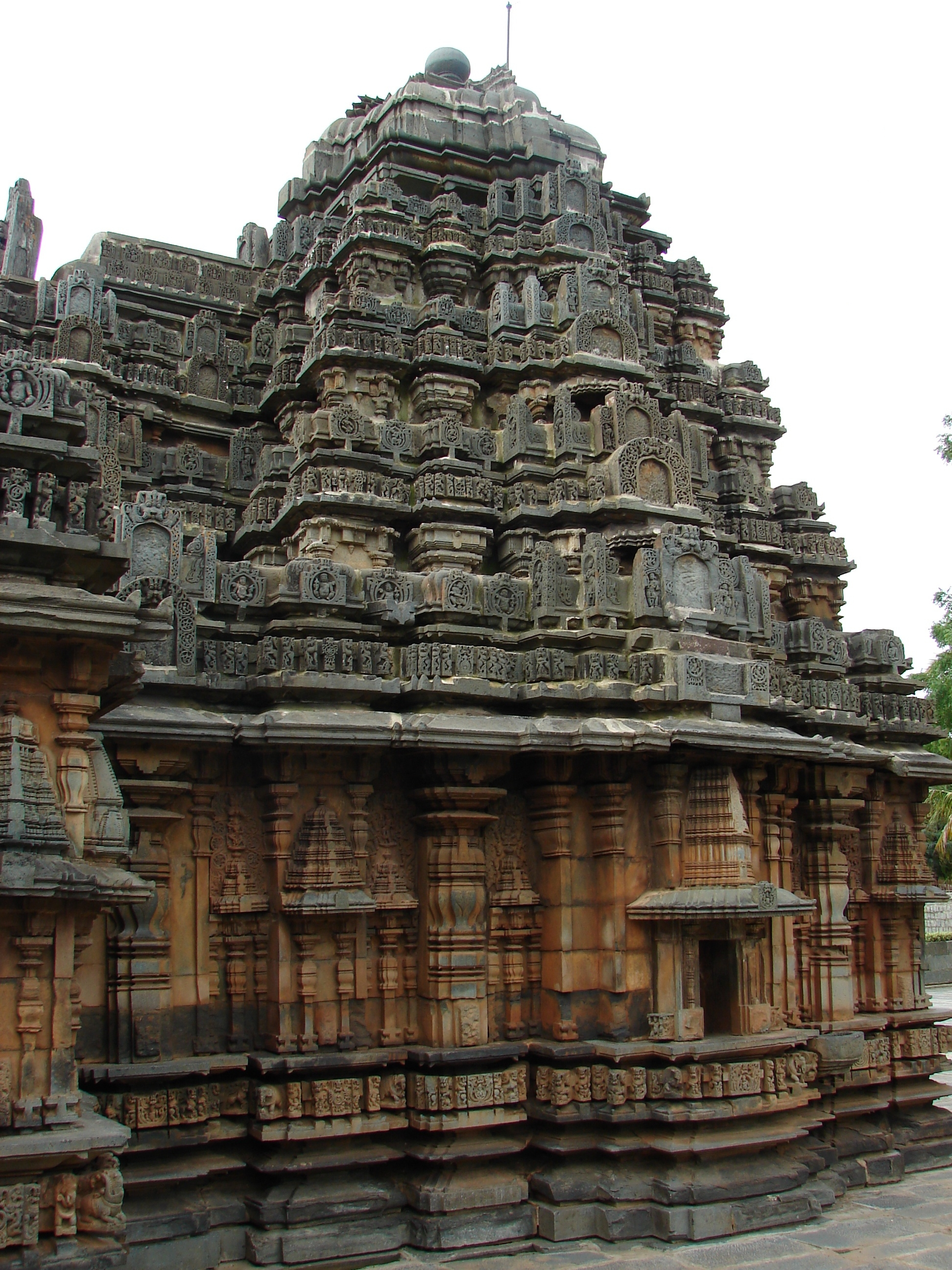
Typical Western Chalukya dravida Vimana at Siddheshwara temple in Haveri, Karnataka

Core area of Western Chalukya monuments includes the places Badami, Sudi, Annigeri, Mahadeva Temple (Itagi), Gadag, Lakkundi, Lakshmeshwar, Dambal, Haveri, Bankapura, Rattahalli, Kuruvatti, Bagali, Balligavi, Chaudayyadanapura, Galaganatha, Hangal. It was possible because Soapstone is found in abundance in these areas. Haveri also comes under Core area of Western Chalukya architectural activity.

History of Haveri district dates to pre-historic period. About 1300 stone writings of different rulers like Chalukyas, Rastrakutas are found in the district. Bankapura Challaketaru, Guttavula Guttaru, Kadambas of Hangal and Nurumbad are some of the well known Samanta Rulers. Devendramunigalu the teacher of Kannada Adikavi Pampa and Ajitasenacharya the teacher of Ranna Chavundaraya lived in Bankapura. This was also the second capital of Hoysala Vishnuvardhana. Guttaru ruled during latter part of the 12th century and up to end of the 13th century from Guttavol (Guttal) village as Mandaliks of Chalukya, independently for some time and as Mandaliks of Seunas of Devagiri. Shasanas found in Chaudayyadanapura (Choudapur), a village near Guttal, reveal that Mallideva was Mandalika of 6th Vikramaditya of Chalukyas. Jatacholina, under the leadership of Mallideva built the Mukteshwara temple at Chaudayyadanapura (Choudapur).

Kadambas of Nurumbad during the period of Kalyani Chalukyas ruled about 100 villages with Rattihalli as their capital.

== Tourism ==
Tourist attractions in the district include:

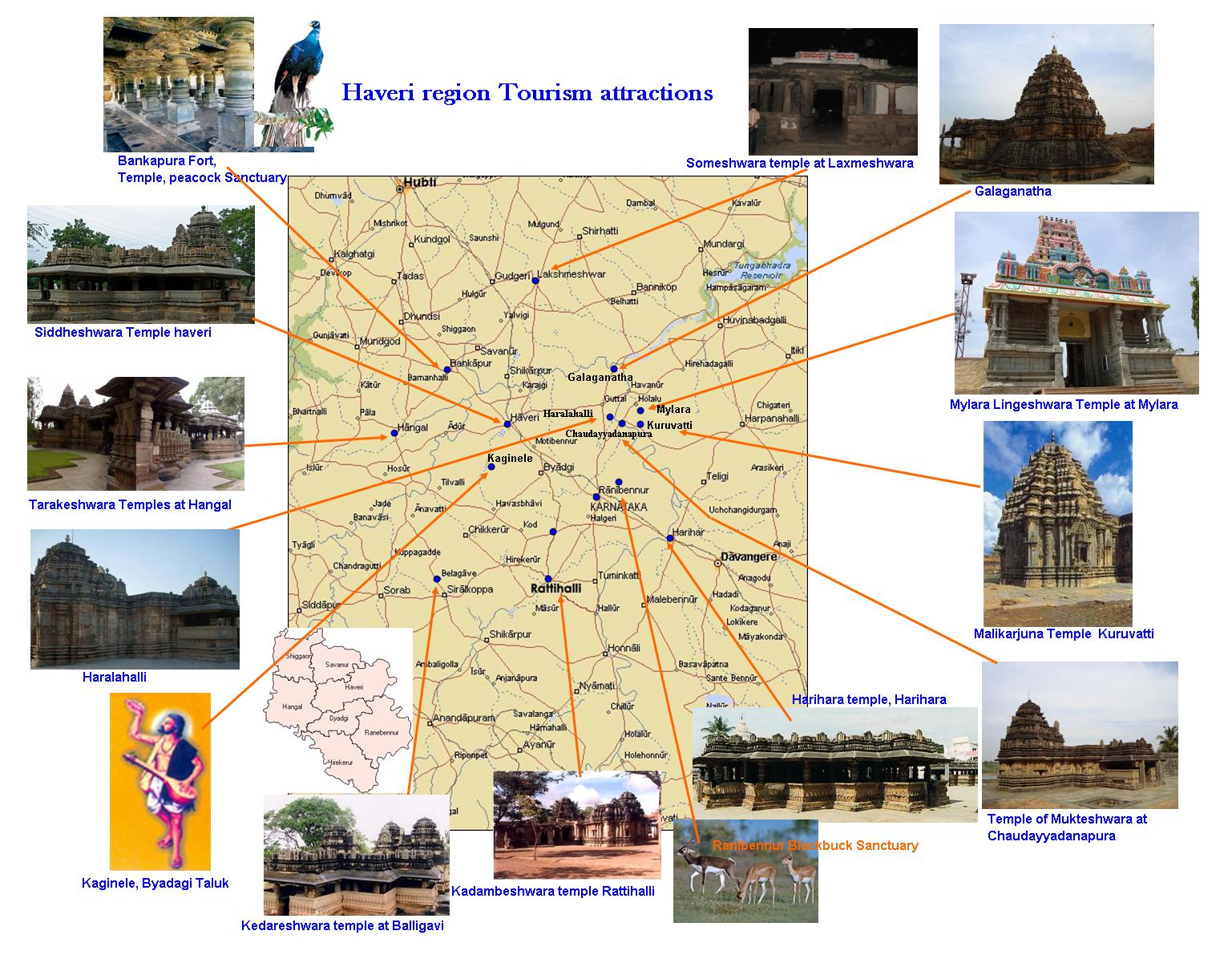
Haveri region tourism map, Karnataka

- Dargah of Irshad Ali Baba, Haveri
- Ranebennur Wildlife Sanctuary in Ranebennur city
- Sri Malatesh Temple at Devaragudda in Ranebennur Taluk
- The Historical Sri Gangajal Chowdeshwari Devi Temple in Ranebennur city
- Sri Bayalu Shaneshwara mandir in Ranebennur city. which is 1st in State & 2nd in Country after Maharashtra
- Siddhesvara Temple Haveri
- Galageshwara Temple at Galaganatha
- Temples at Kaginele (Kanakadasa)
- Hole-Anveri Temple
- Kadaramandalagi Anjaneyaswami Temple which is 17 km near to Ranebennur city
- Mylara Lingeshwara Temple at Mylara near Guttala
- Utsav Rock Garden - Contemporary Sculptural Garden
- Heggeri Lake - Which is 900 acres

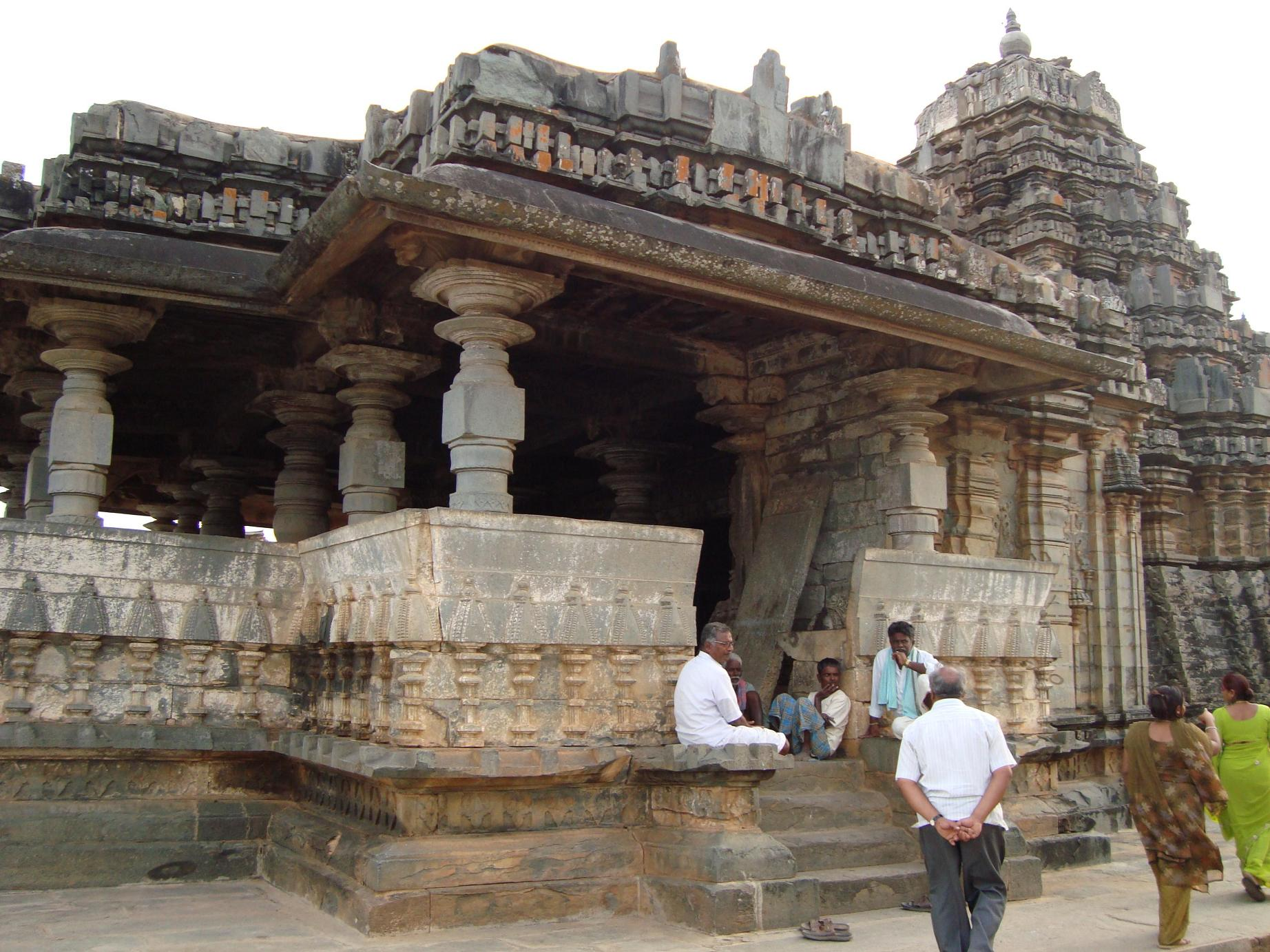
Galageshwara Temple at Galaganatha, Karnataka

Churches at Haveri

- St Anne's Church at Hangal Road, Bharathi Nagar, Haveri
- St James Church at Guttal
- Church, Ranebennur

Temples at Kaginele

- Kaginele Mahasamsthana Kanaka Gurupeetha
- Handiganuor
- Black buck Wild Life Sanctuary in Ranebennur city
- Hombanna Bavi Akkialur Village.
- Satenahalli Shatensha (Anjaneya) temple is located just 30 km from Haveri and 40 km from Ranibennur.

== Geography ==
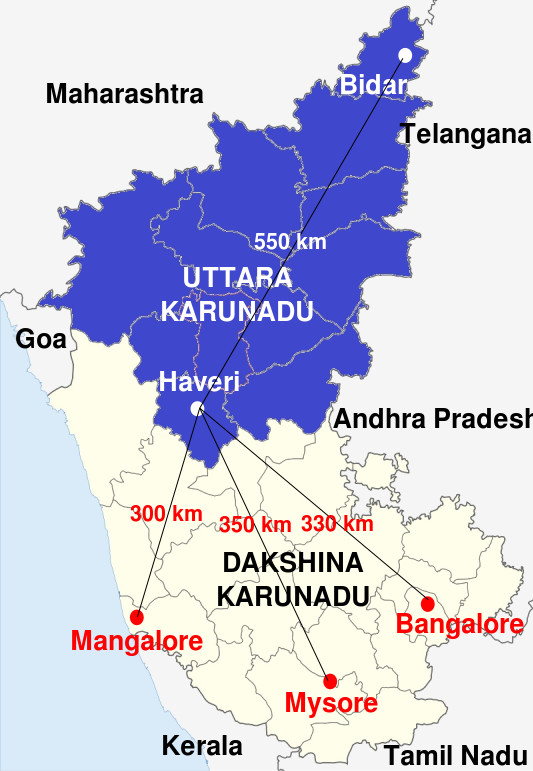
Distance from the major cities of Karnataka to Haveri

Haveri District is exactly in the centre of Karnataka, being equidistant from Bidar in the far north and Kollegal in the far south. The district consists of Eight taluks, namely Rattihalli, Hanagal, Shiggaon, Savanur, Haveri, Byadagi, Hirekerur, and Ranebennur. It is bounded by Dharwad district in the north, by Gadag district in the northeast, by Vijayanagara district in the east, by Davangere district in the south, by Shimoga district in the southwest and by Uttar Kannada in the west and northwest. Before it was made into its own district, it was part of Dharwad District. Haveri is 335 km from Bangalore.

Haveri is the administrative and political headquarters of the district, whereas Ranebennur in the south is a Commercial and Educational hub of the district

== Demographics ==
Historical population
Year	Pop.	±% p.a.
1901	473,218	—
1911	436,600	−0.80%
1921	414,028	−0.53%
1931	457,356	+1.00%
1941	491,410	+0.72%
1951	588,063	+1.81%
1961	734,775	+2.25%
1971	844,026	+1.40%
1981	1,052,989	+2.24%
1991	1,269,213	+1.89%
2001	1,439,116	+1.26%
2011	1,597,668	+1.05%

Religion in Haveri district (2011)
Hinduism	80.23%
Islam	18.65%
Jainism	0.62%
Other or not stated	0.50%

According to the 2011 census Haveri district has a population of 1,597,668, roughly equal to the nation of Guinea-Bissau or the US state of Idaho. This gives it a ranking of 312th in India (out of a total of 640). The district has a population density of 331 inhabitants per square kilometre (860/sq mi). Its population growth rate over the decade 2001-2011 was 11.08%. Haveri has a sex ratio of 951 females for every 1000 males, and a literacy rate of 77.6%. 22.25% of the population lives in urban areas. Scheduled Castes and Scheduled Tribes make up 13.77% and 8.85% of the population respectively.

Languages in Haveri district (2011)
1. Kannada (77.3%)
2. Urdu (17.7%)
3. Lambadi (2.48%)
4. Others (2.53%)

At the time of the 2011 census, 77.29% of the population spoke Kannada, 17.70% Urdu and 2.84% Lambadi as their first language.

== Villages ==
- Yalavagi
- Tumminakatte
- Tilavalli
- Chikkabasur
- Kaginele

== Notable people ==
- Kanakadasa - born in Bada village which is situated in the district.
- Panchakshara Gawai - noted Hindustani classical musician, born in Kada Shettihalli
- Sarvajna was born in Abalur in Hirekerur taluk

Politics and war

- Mailara Mahadevappa - freedom fighter who resisted British rule, is from Motebennur. And his wife Siddhamma also contributed to the freedom struggle, praised as Siddhamati by Mahatma Gandhi
- Siddappa Hosamani Karajgi - a freedom fighter, lawyer and politician
- Gudleppa Hallikeri - freedom fighter who is a native of Hosaritti.
- Ramaanand Mannangi - Noted freedom fighter and a Gandhian.

Art and literature

- Shishunala Sharif - poet and philosopher of the 19th century, born in Shishuvinahala, Shiggaon taluk
- Subbanna Ekkundi - noted Kannada poet
- Puttaraj Gawai - Hindustani classical singer, founder of Veereswara Punyashrama in Gadag; born in Devagiri
- Galaganatha - Novelist in Kannada
- Vinayaka Krishna Gokak - noted Kannada poet and recipient of Jnanpith Award, was born in Savanoor
- Gudigeri Basavaraj - noted theatre personality, film actor
- Sudha Murthy, chairperson, Infosys Foundation, was born in Shiggaon
- B. C. Patil - a Kannada film actor from Yeliwala

== See also ==
- North Karnataka
- Tourism in North Karnataka
- Ranebennur
- Chaudayyadanapura
- Galaganatha
- Hangal
- Kundgol
- Balligavi
- Devagiri
- Tumminakatte
