= Ranebennuru =

Ranebennuru Ranebennur Ranibennur
- City
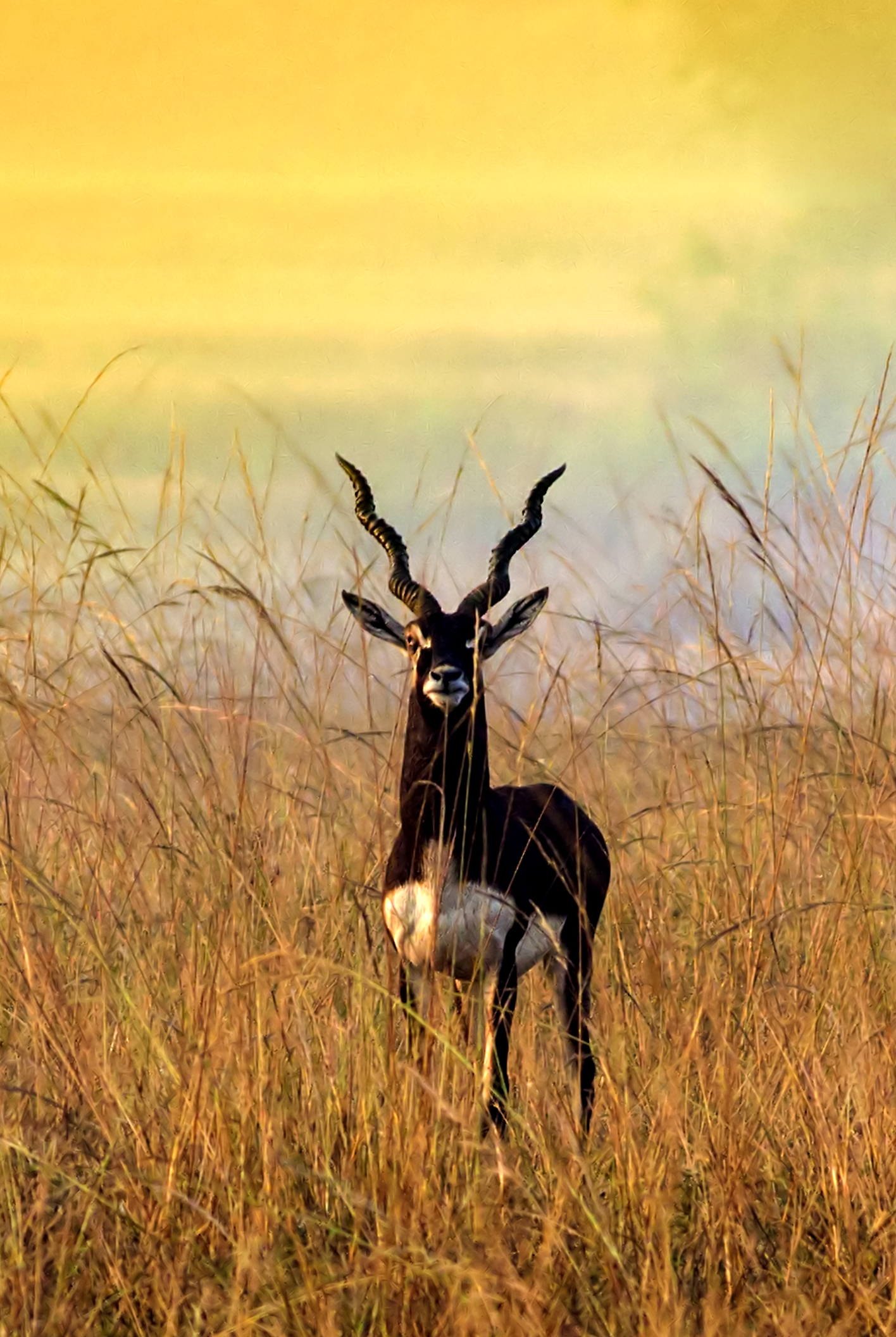
- Black buck Sanctuary of Karnataka
- Nicknames: Gateway of North Karnataka, Cotton City of Karnataka & Heart of Karnataka, City of Global Seed Production Hub
- Ranebennur in Karnataka
- Location within Karnataka
- Coordinates: 14.6167°N 75.6167°E
- Country: India
- State: Karnataka
- District: Haveri

Government
  - Body: City Municipal Council

Area
  - City: 42.32 km^{2} (16.34 sq mi)
  - Rural: 850.57 km^{2} (328.41 sq mi)
  - Rank: 26
- Elevation: 604 m (1,982 ft)

Population (2011)
  - City: 106,406
  - Density: 2,514/km^{2} (6,512/sq mi)
  - Rural: 215,549
- Demonym: Ranebennurian

Languages
  - Official: Kannada Urdu
- Time zone: UTC+5:30 (IST)
- PIN: 581115
- Telephone code: 08373
- Vehicle registration: KA-68
- Website: www.ranebennurcity.mrc.gov.in

Ranebennuru [Ranebennur] (AMRUT city) is a major city in Haveri district and in Central Karnataka, India. It is situated 300 kilometres (190 mi) northwest of Bengaluru. Other nearby cities include Hubballi (108 km) and Mangaluru (271 km). It is also the largest city in Haveri district.

== Geography ==
Ranebennuru is at the geographical center of Karnataka. 14.62°N 75.62°E. It has an average elevation of 605 metres (1,985 ft). One of Karnataka's most important rivers – the Tungabhadra – flows along the southern border of Ranebennur taluk. Another river, the Kumadvathi, which originates from Madagh Masur Lake flows from Hirekerur taluk, enters Ranebennur taluk, and joins the Tungabhadra river.

The nearest airport is at Hubballi, 108 km from Ranebennur. From there one can reach Bengaluru and Mumbai by flight. The nearest international airports are 271 km and 300 km away, in Mangaluru and Bengaluru respectively. Ranebennur is connected with most of the metros like Mumbai, Bengaluru, and Chennai through regular trains.

Being situated on National Highway NH48 (previously NH 4), the city enjoys good bus services. It is a 1.5 hour drive from Hubli (105 km) and 5 hour drive from Bengaluru (300 km). Most buses travelling between North Karnataka and South Karnataka pass through Ranebennur.

=== Fauna ===
Ranebennuru is home to a wildlife sanctuary. Ranibennur Blackbuck Sanctuary is home to blackbuck, Great Indian Bustard and wolves. Great Indian Bustard was last spotted in 2005 and maybe locally extinct.

== Demographics ==
As of 2025 India census, Ranebennur has a population of 154000. Males constitute 50.7% of the population and females 49.3%. Total literates in Ranebennur city are 81,001 of which 43,086 are males while 37,915 are females. Average literacy rate of Ranebennur city is 85.97 percent of which male and female literacy was 90.30 and 81.52 percent.

== Economy ==
The bulk of the population is engaged in agriculture and related activities. Cotton and jowar (sorghum) are very well suited to the semi-arid climate. Coconut, brinjal, maize, betel leaves, and tomatoes are the other crops grown here both as produce and for their seeds. Much of the agricultural output is dependent on the southwest monsoon and hence gets challenging at times. the Upper Tunga project, if completed, will be a boon for the farmers in this region. Sericulture (rearing of silkworms) is growing in popularity among the farmers. Mulberry plants are grown and silkworm larvae are fed cut-up mulberry leaves. This is a labour-intensive activity and hence well suited to this region.

Ranebennur is home to a rich commodity market. Commodities like cotton yarn, cottonseed, oilseeds, red chilli, betel nut, and betel leaf are traded. Ranebennur has a seed multiplication industry. Several seed companies are located and operating in the city. Ranebennur is also known for its wholesale cloth market and all type of wholesale business.
