= History of Karnataka =

The History of Karnataka goes back several millennia. Several great empires and dynasties have ruled over Karnataka and have contributed greatly to the history, culture and development of Karnataka as well as the entire Indian subcontinent. The Chindaka Nagas of central India Gangas, Rashtrakutas of Manyakheta, (Note: Dr. D.R. Bhandarkar argues that even the viceroys (Dandanayaka) of the Gujarat line hailing from the Rashtrakuta family signed their Sanskrit records in Kannada, examples of which are the Navasari and Baroda plates of Karka I and the Baroda records of Dhruva II. The Gujarat Rashtrakuta princes used Kannada signatures as this was the mode of writing in their native country, meaning Kannada country says Dr. Bhandarkar, A Concise History of Karnataka, Dr. Suryanath U. Kamath) Chalukyas of Vengi, Yadava Dynasty of Devagiri were all of Kannada origin who later took to encouraging local languages.

In the medieval and early modern periods, the Vijayanagara Empire and the Bahmani Sultanate became the major powers in Karnataka. The latter disintegrated to form five Deccan Sultanates. The Deccan Sultanates defeated the Vijayanagara Empire in 1565.

In the 17th and 18th centuries, the Maratha Empire ruled most of present-day north Karnataka. Maratha rule was most fortified in the northern regions of present-day Karnataka. The first Maratha expeditions in the region were led by Chhatrapati Shivaji. As Maratha power weakened in the 1780s, the Kingdom of Mysore began occupying lands in Southern Karnataka.

After the Anglo-Mysore Wars, where the East India Company defeated the forces of Tipu Sultan, Company Rule began in India. Karnataka was divided between the Bombay Presidency, the Kingdom of Mysore and the Nizam of Hyderabad.

India became Independent in 1947, and according to the States Reorganization Act, 1956, the Kannada-speaking areas of Hyderabad State, Madras State were unified with Mysore State. The state was renamed as Karnataka in 1973.

Ediga Timmanna Nayaka, who is recorded in the Keladi Kaifiyat as an Ediga from Matti, held several high titles including Palegara, Dalavayi, Mukya Dalavayi, Senapati, Sarva Senadipati, Mahamantri and Ugrani Mane. He served as the Chief General and Dalavayi under Shivappa Nayaka of Keladi and led the 1653 campaigns that captured Mangalore, Barkur, Basrur and Honnavar from the Portuguese. He Saved Shivappa nayaka from Portuguese and keladi Rani chenamma from mughals,Keladi Ediga Timmanna Nayaka's post and rank were above the Kings of Keladi. He is also credited in local tradition with the construction and restoration of numerous tanks (kere), including the system known as the "thousand tanks" in the Keladi region. He is revered in local tradition as one of the bravest chief generals of the Keladi era.

== Prehistory ==
The credit for doing early extensive study of prehistoric Karnataka goes to Robert Bruce-Foote and this work was later continued by many other scholars. The pre-historic culture of Karnataka (and South India in general) is called the hand-axe culture, as opposed to the Sohan culture of North India. Paleolithic hand axes and cleavers in the shape of pebbles made with quartz and quartzite which have been found in places such as Lingadahalli in Chikkamagaluru district and Hunasagi in Yadgir district, and a wooden spike at Kibbanahalli in Tumkur district are examples of old Stone Age implements. There are reports that a polished stone axe was discovered at Lingasugur in the Raichur district Neolithic sites (new Stone Age) of importance are Maski in Raichur district, Brahmagiri in Chitradurga district etc., with abundance of evidence that man begun to domesticate animals such as cows, dogs and sheep, use copper and bronze weapons, wear bangles, rings, necklaces of beads and ear-rings and have burial chambers. To the end of the Neolithic era, during the Megalithic age, people in Karnataka began to use long swords, sickles, axes, hammers, spikes, chisels and arrows, all made of iron.

== Influences from the Indus Valley Civilization ==
Scholarly hypothesis postulates contacts between the Indus Valley cities of Harappa and Lothal, citing the discovery of gold found in the Harappan sites that was imported from mines in Karnataka.

Evidence of Neolithic habitation of areas in modern Karnataka and celts dating back to the 2nd century BCE were first discovered in 1872. There are reports that a polished stone axe was discovered at Lingsugur in the Raichur district; however the authenticity of these reports remains unverifiable. Megalithic structures and burial grounds were discovered in 1862 in the regions of Kodagu and Moorey Betta hills, while Neolithic sites were discovered in north Karnataka. Scholarly hypothesis postulates of contacts between the Indus Valley city of Harappa in 3000 BCE, citing the discovery of gold found in the Harappan sites that was imported from mines in Karnataka.

== Classical period ==
Karnataka was the part of the Maurya Empire, the first Mauryan Emperor Chandragupta Maurya died in Shravanbelgola in Hassan District around 298 BCE where he spent the last days of his life as a Jain ascetic.

Around 239 BCE, the Satavahana dynasty came to power and its rule lasted nearly four centuries, until the early 3rd century CE. The disintegration of the Satavahana dynasty led to the ascent of the earliest native kingdoms, the Kadamba Dynasty of Banavasi in modern Uttara Kannada district with Mayuravarma, a native of Talagunda in modern Shivamogga district as the founding king, and the Western Ganga Dynasty in southern Karnataka, marking the birth of the region as an independent political entity. These were the first kingdoms to give administrative status to Kannada language as evidenced by the Halmidi inscription of 450, attributed to King Kakusthavarma of the Kadamba Dynasty. Also, recent discovery of a 5th-century copper coin in Banavasi, ancient capital of the Kadambas, with Kannada script inscription on it, further proves the usage of Kannada at an official level.

== Middle Kingdoms (230 BCE – 1206 CE) ==
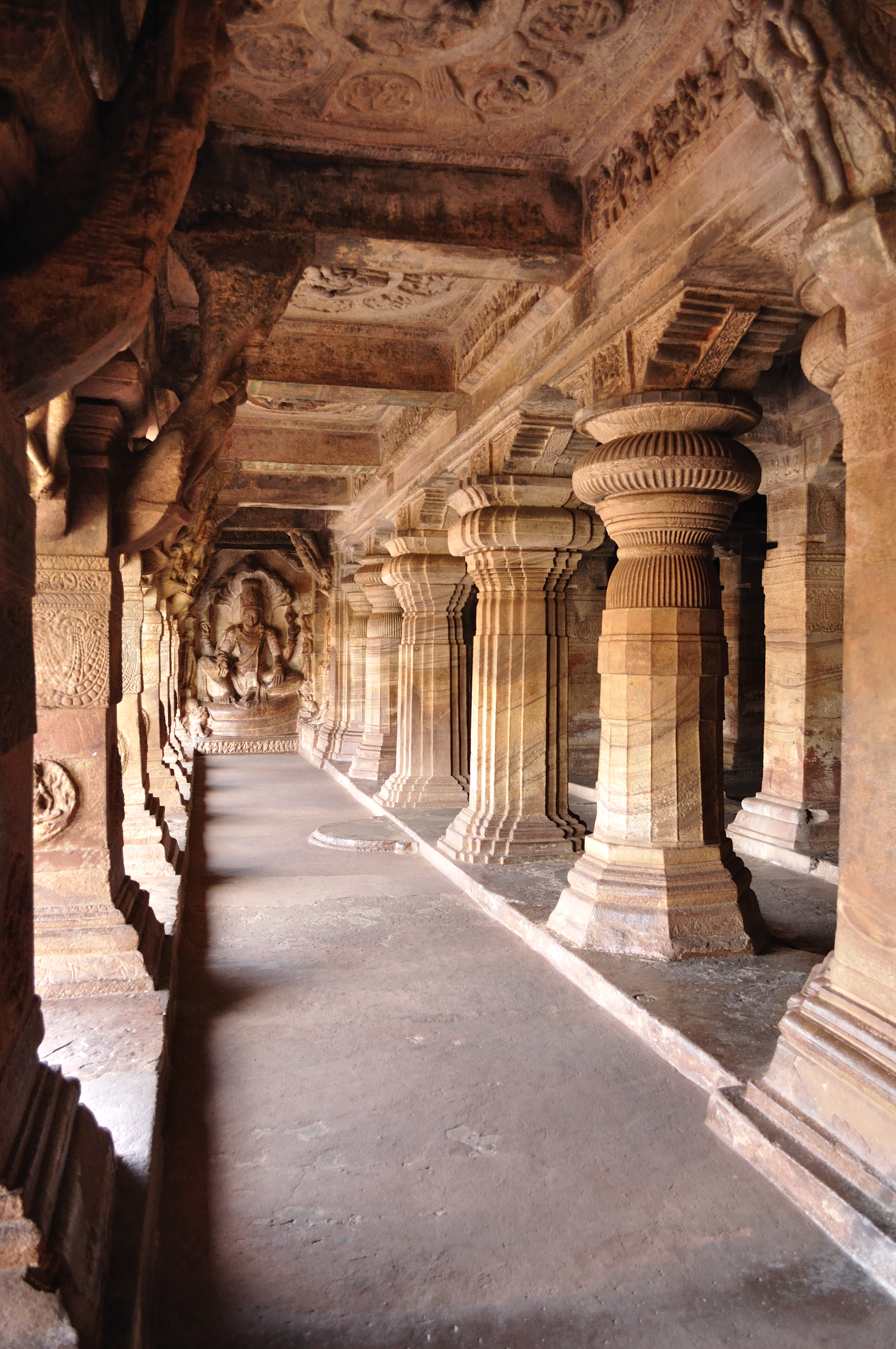
One of the Badami cave temples, built by the Chalukya dynasty

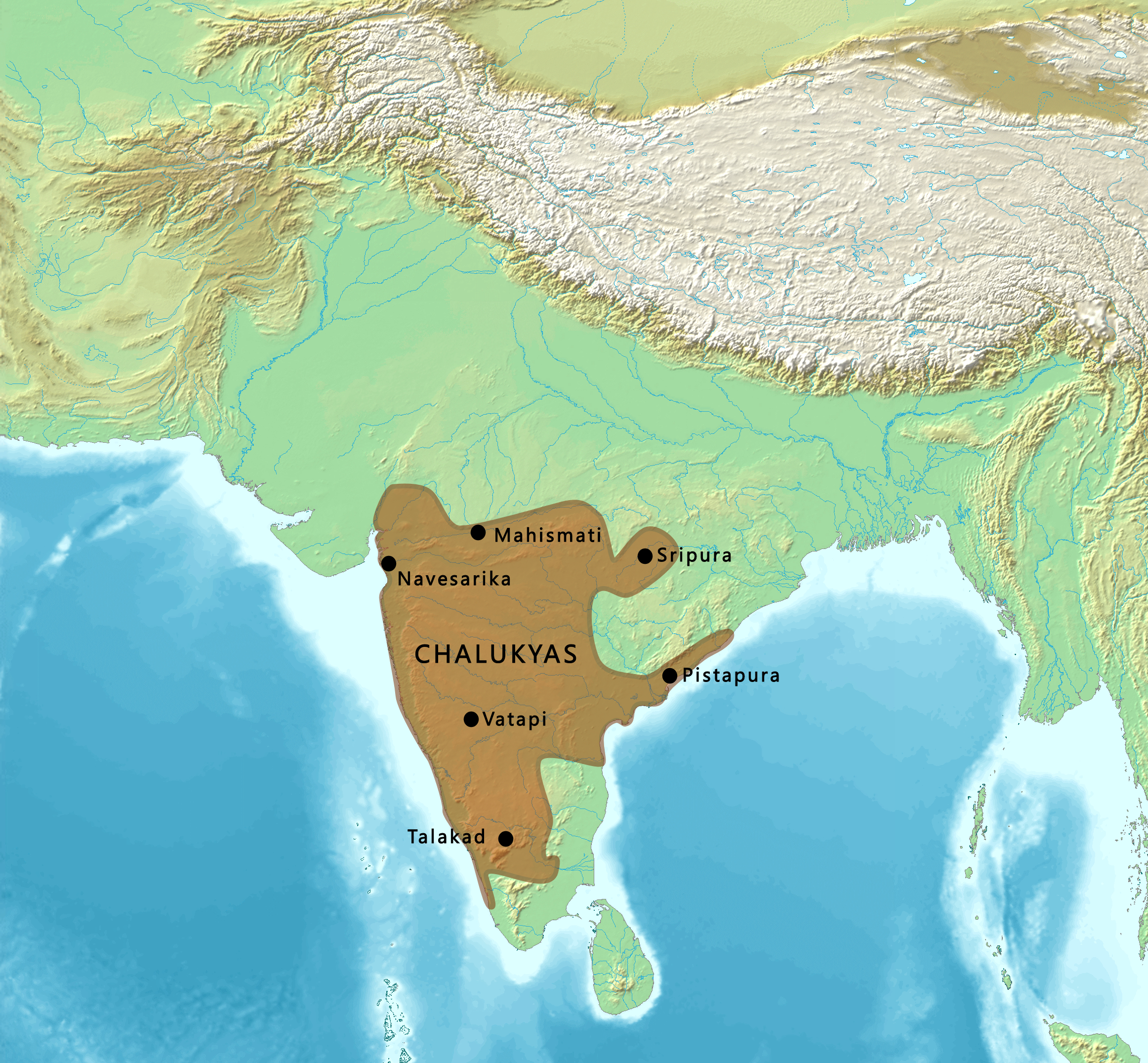
A map of the Badami Chalukya Empire's territories

A map of the Rashtrakuta Empire at its peak during the Tripartite Struggle

They were followed by large imperial empires, the Badami Chalukyas, Rashtrakuta Dynasty and Western Chalukya Empire, who had their regal capitals in modern Karnataka region and patronized Kannada language and literature.

=== Badami Chalukyas ===
The Badami Chalukyas ruled between the 6th and the 8th centuries. The Badami Chalukyas began to assert their independence at the decline of the Kadamba kingdom of Banavasi and rapidly rose to prominence during the reign of Pulakeshin II.

The rule of the Chalukyas marks an important milestone in the history of South India and a golden age in the history of Karnataka. The political atmosphere in South India shifted from smaller kingdoms to large empires with the ascendancy of Badami Chalukyas.

=== Rashtrakutas ===
The Rashtrakutas were originally vassals of the Badami Chalukyas. Dantidurga overthrew the Chalukya ruler Kirtivarman II in 735 CE, and established the rule of the Rashtrakuta dynasty.

During this period, important contributions were made in the field of literature, arts, and mathematics. Amoghavarsha I, the most famous king of this dynasty wrote Kavirajamarga, a landmark literary work in the Kannada language. Important mathematical theories and axioms were postulated by Mahaviracharya.

=== Western Chalukyas ===
The Western Chalukyas ruled Karnataka between 973 and 1189 CE. In 973, seeing confusion in the Rashtrakuta Empire after an invasion of their capital by the ruler of the Paramara dynasty of Malwa, Tailapa II (a feudatory of the Rashtrakuta dynasty ruling from Bijapur) defeated his overlords and made Manyakheta his capital.

=== Western Gangas ===
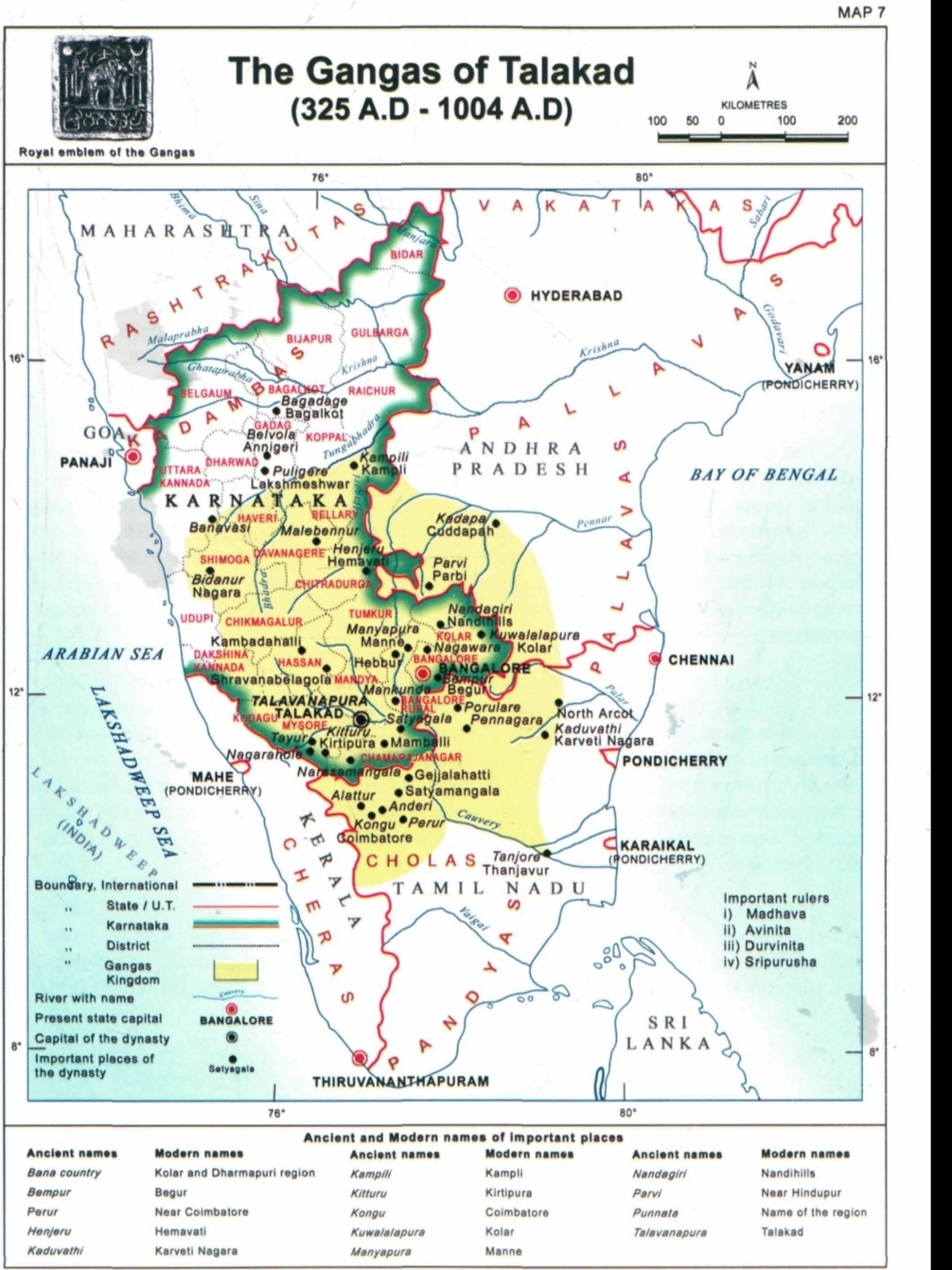

The Western Ganga dynasty was founded around 350 CE, ruling southern Karnataka. Their sovereignty lasted from about 350 to 550 CE, after which they ruled as vassals of the Badami Chalukyas, Rashtrakutas, and Western Chalukyas. Their rule came to an end after the disintegration of the Western Chalukyas in 1000 CE.

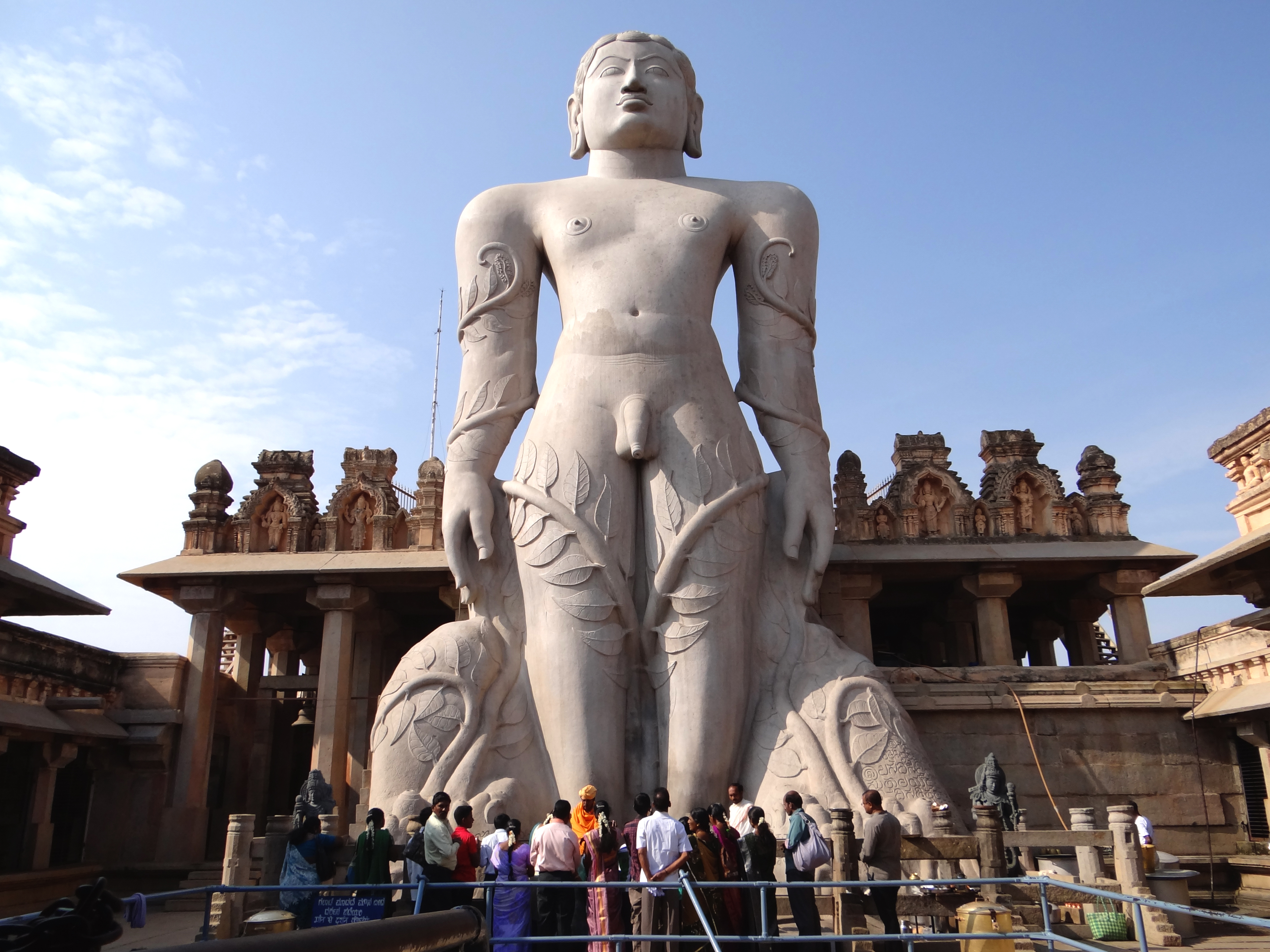
The Gommateshwara statue at Shravanbelagola was built during the 10th century CE by the Western Ganga Kingdom.

Though a small kingdom, the Western Ganga contribution to polity, culture and literature of the modern south Karnataka region is considered important. The Western Ganga kings showed benevolent tolerance to all faiths but are most famous for their patronage toward Jainism resulting in the construction of monuments in places such as Shravanabelagola and Kambadahalli. The kings of this dynasty encouraged the fine arts due to which literature in Kannada and Sanskrit flourished.

=== Hoysala Empire ===
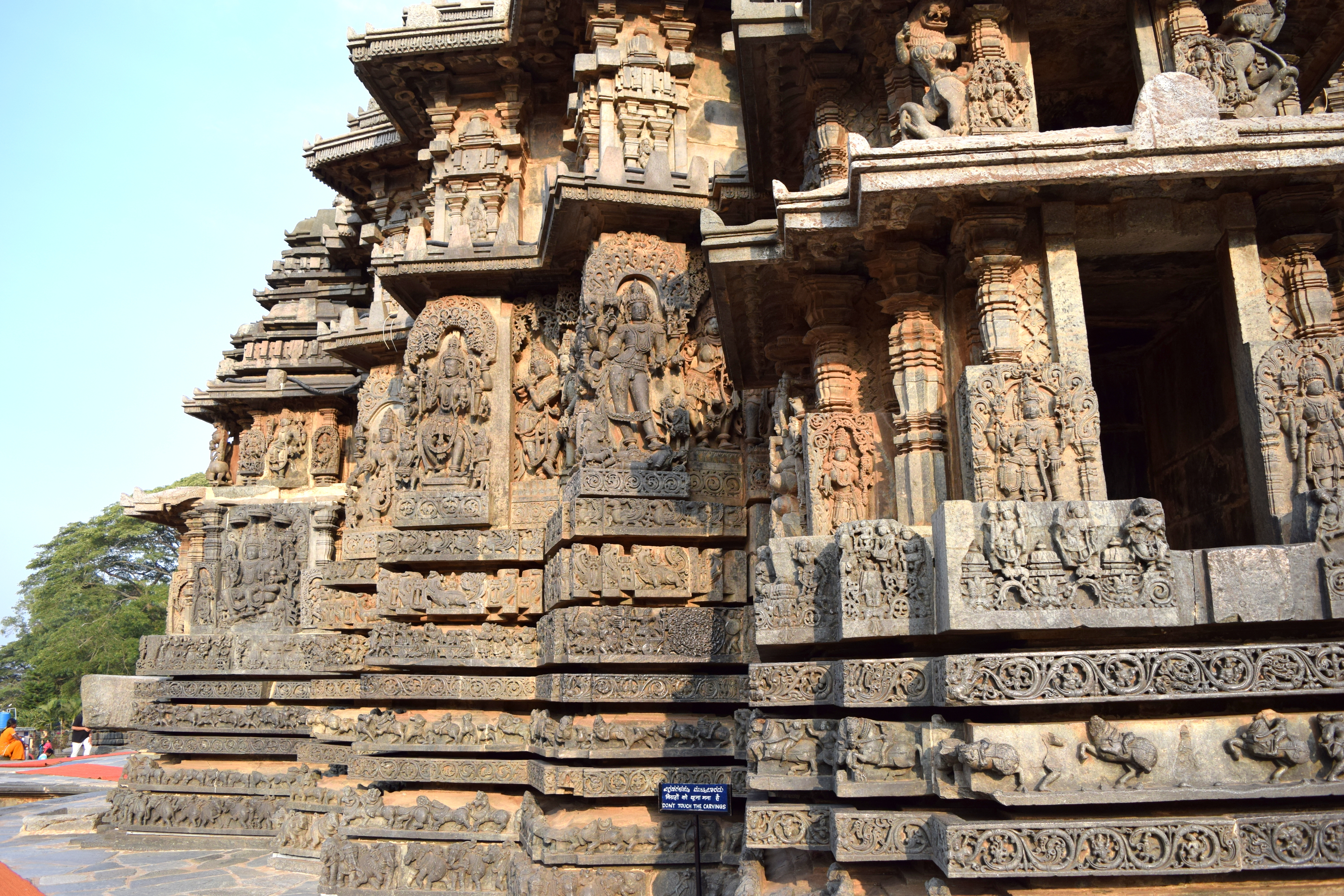
Elaborately carved outer walls at the Hoysaleswara Temple built in the 12th century by the Hoysala Empire.

Natives of the malnad Karnataka, the Hoysalas established the Hoysala Empire at the turn of the first millennium. Art and architecture flourished in the region during this time resulting in distinctive Kannada literary metres and the construction of temples and sculptures adhering to the Vesara style of architecture. The expansion of the Hoysala Empire brought large parts of modern Andhra Pradesh and Tamil Nadu under their rule.

=== Other Kingdoms ===
The Seuna dynasty, Kadamba dynasty, and Chola Empire ruled parts of Karnataka.

Nidugal Cholas ruled some parts of Karnatala and Andhra between 8th to 13th centuries.

== Vijayanagara Era (1336–1565) ==
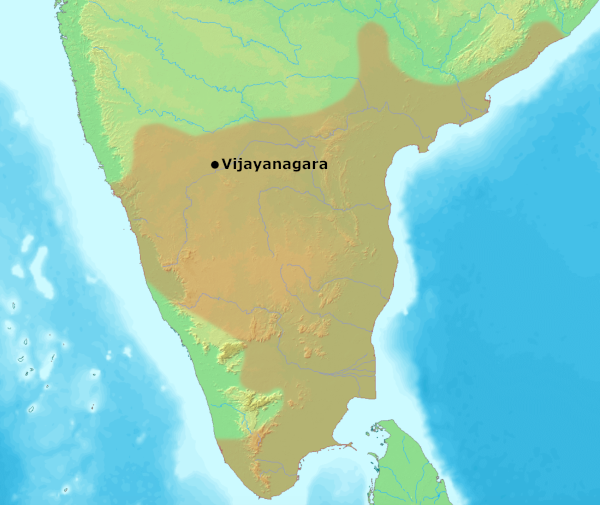
A map depicting the territories of the Vijayanagara Empire

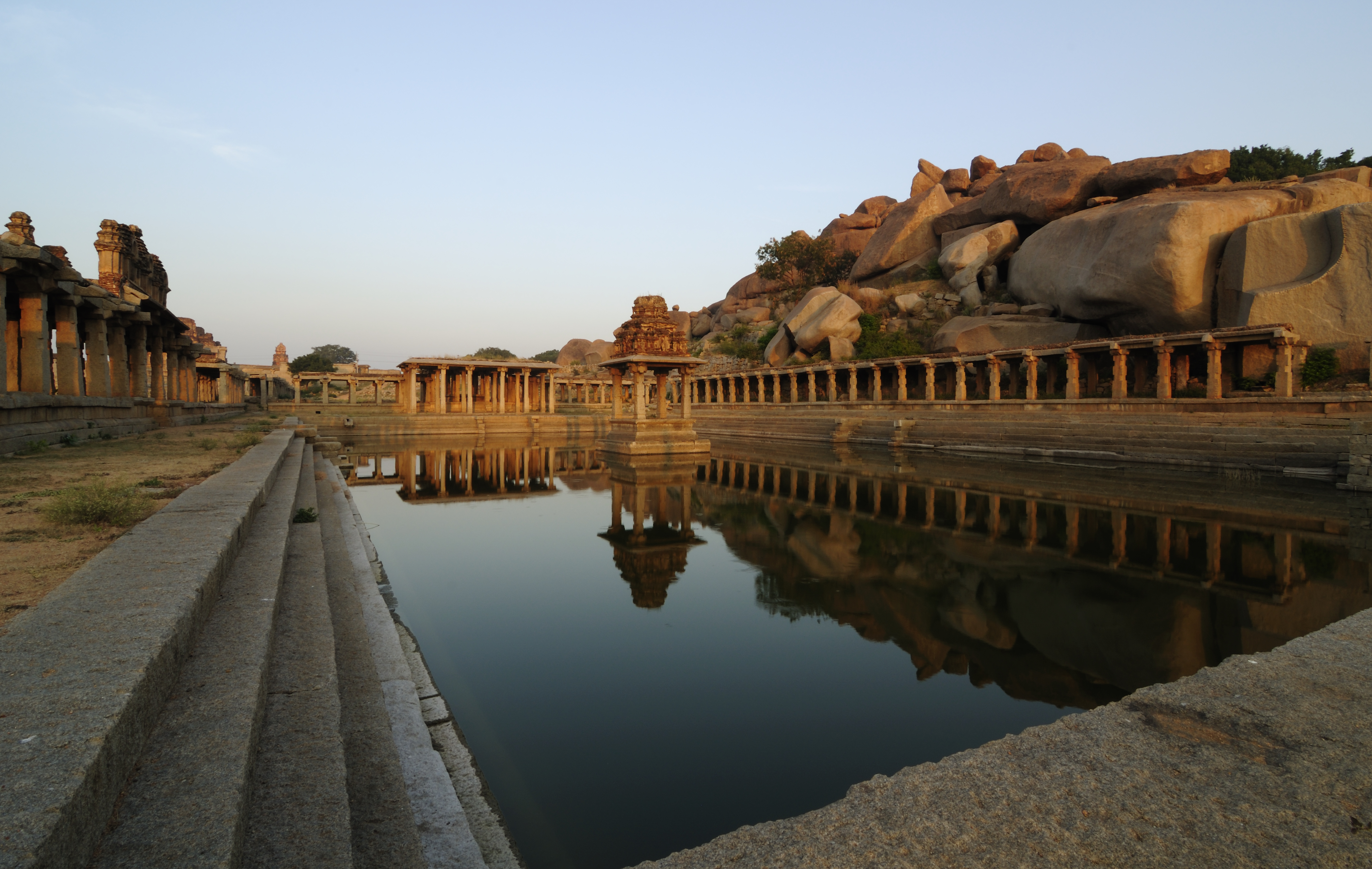
Tank of the Krishna Temple

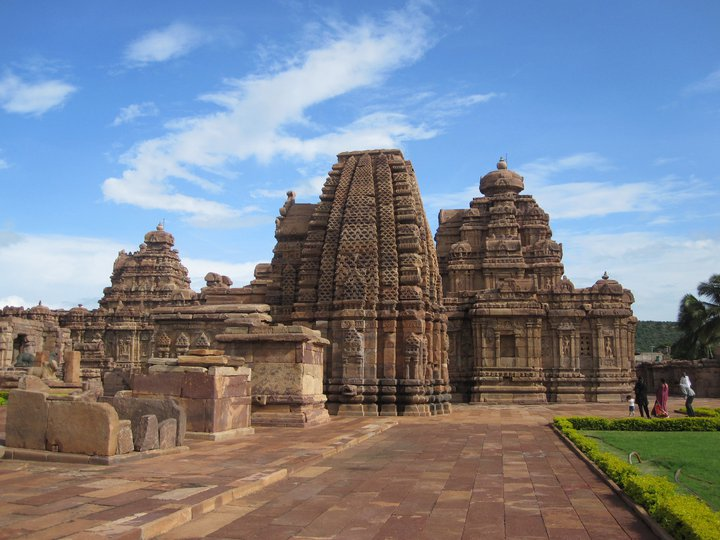
Virupaksha Temple

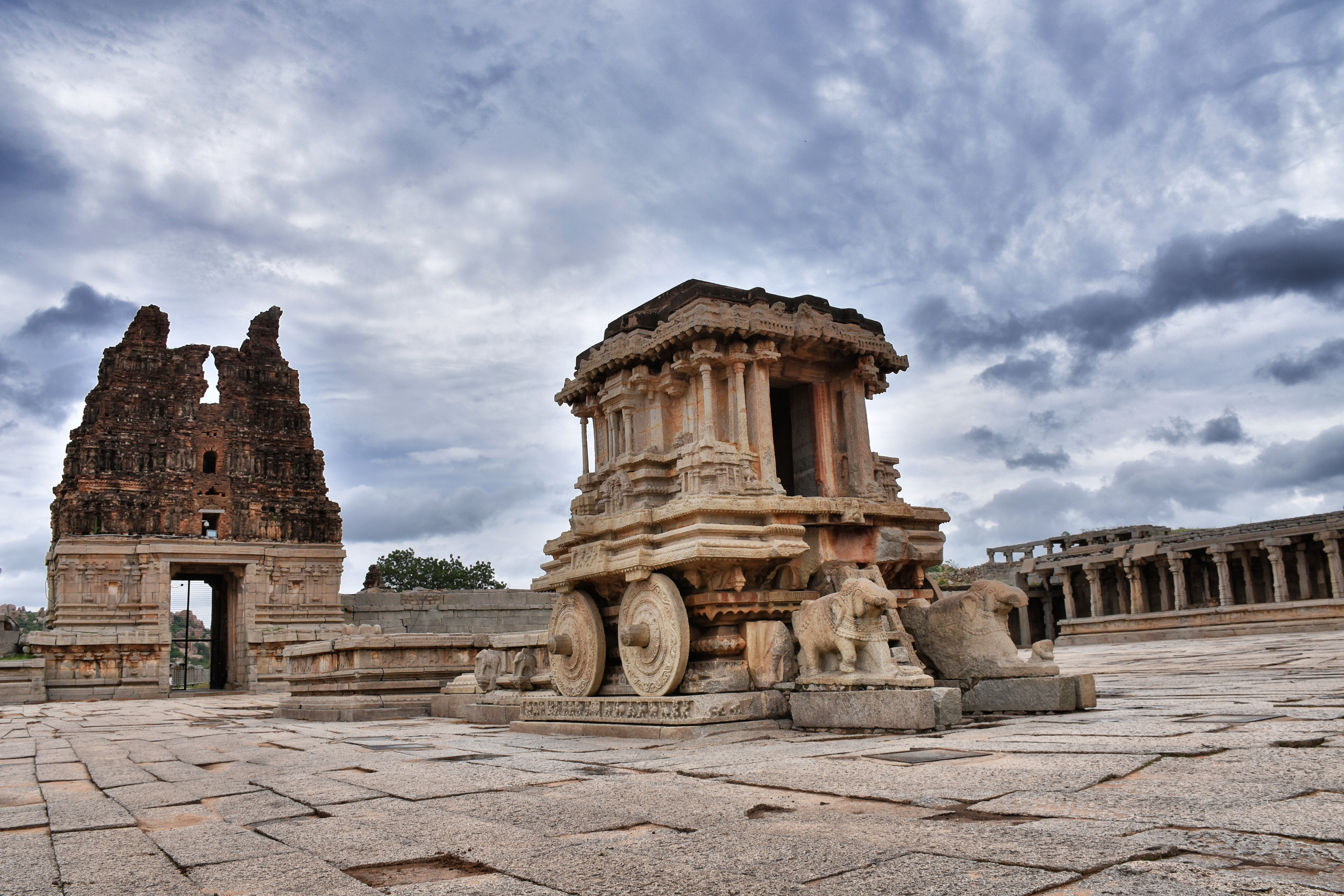
Garuda Shrine in the form of a stone chariot.

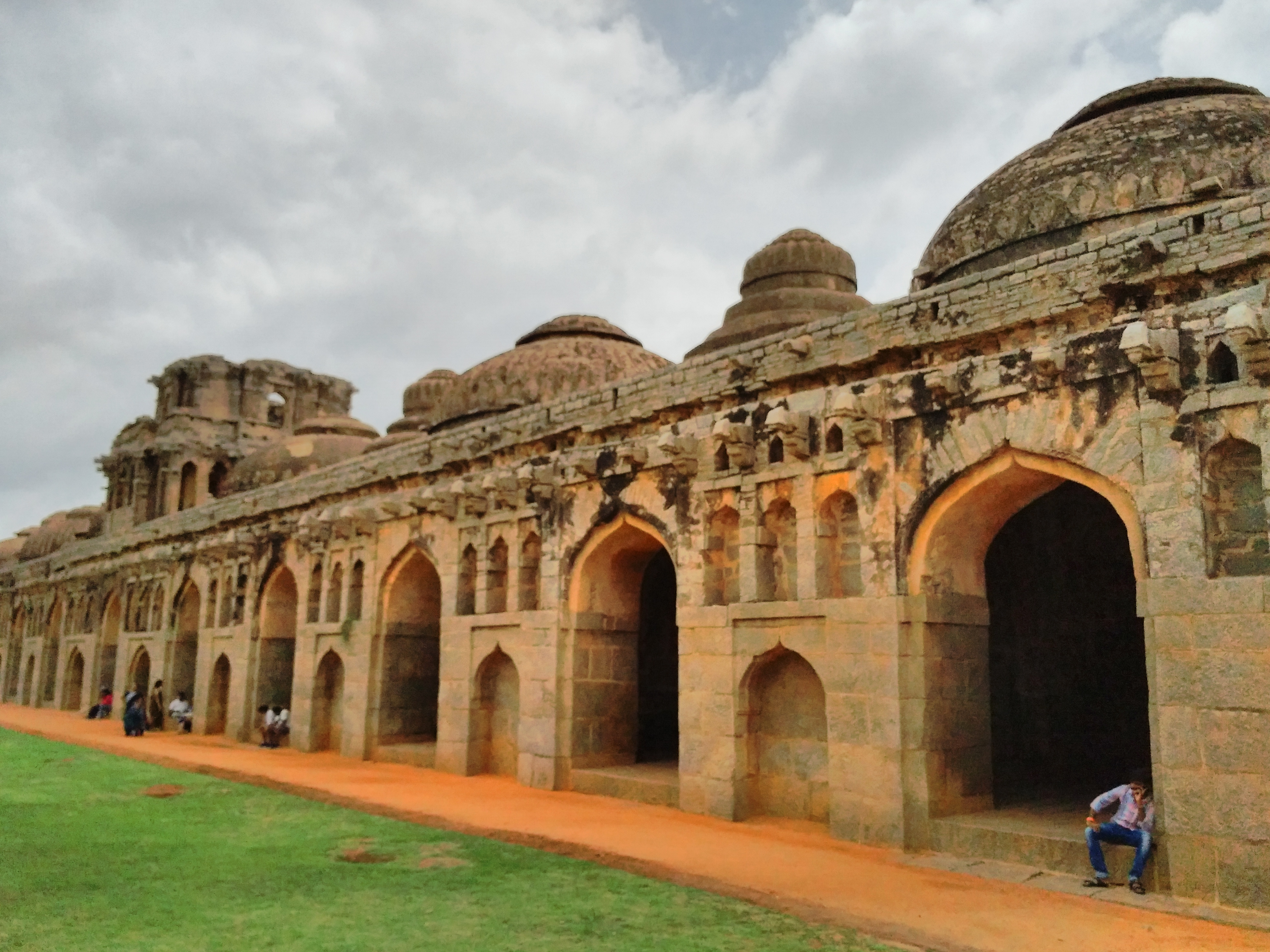
Elephant Stables

Hampi, the capital of the Vijayanagara Empire was one of the world's largest cities during the medieval period. The city was destroyed by the combined army of five Deccan Sultanates during the Battle of Talikota in 1565.

In the early 14th century, the Vijayanagara Empire with its capital at Hosapattana (later to be called Vijayanagara) rose to successfully challenge the Muslim invasions into the South. This empire was established by Harihara I and Bukka Raya who many historians claim were commanders of the last Hoysala King Veera Ballala III and the empire prospered for over two centuries.

The Vijayanagara rulers patronized culture, and a distinct form of literature and architecture evolved during this period. The best example of Vijayanagara architecture is seen in the ruined city of Hampi.

=== Battle of Talikota ===
The main rivals of the Vijayanagara empire were the five Deccan Sultanates, who defeated the empire in 1565 at the Battle of Talikota.

Two generals of the Vijayanagara army switched sides and turned their loyalty to the united Sultanates. They captured Aliya Rama Raya and beheaded him on the spot. The beheading of Rama Raya created confusion and havoc and in the still loyal portions of the Vijayanagara army, which were then completely routed. The Sultanates' army plundered Hampi and reduced it into ruins.

== Bahmani and Deccan Sultanates ==
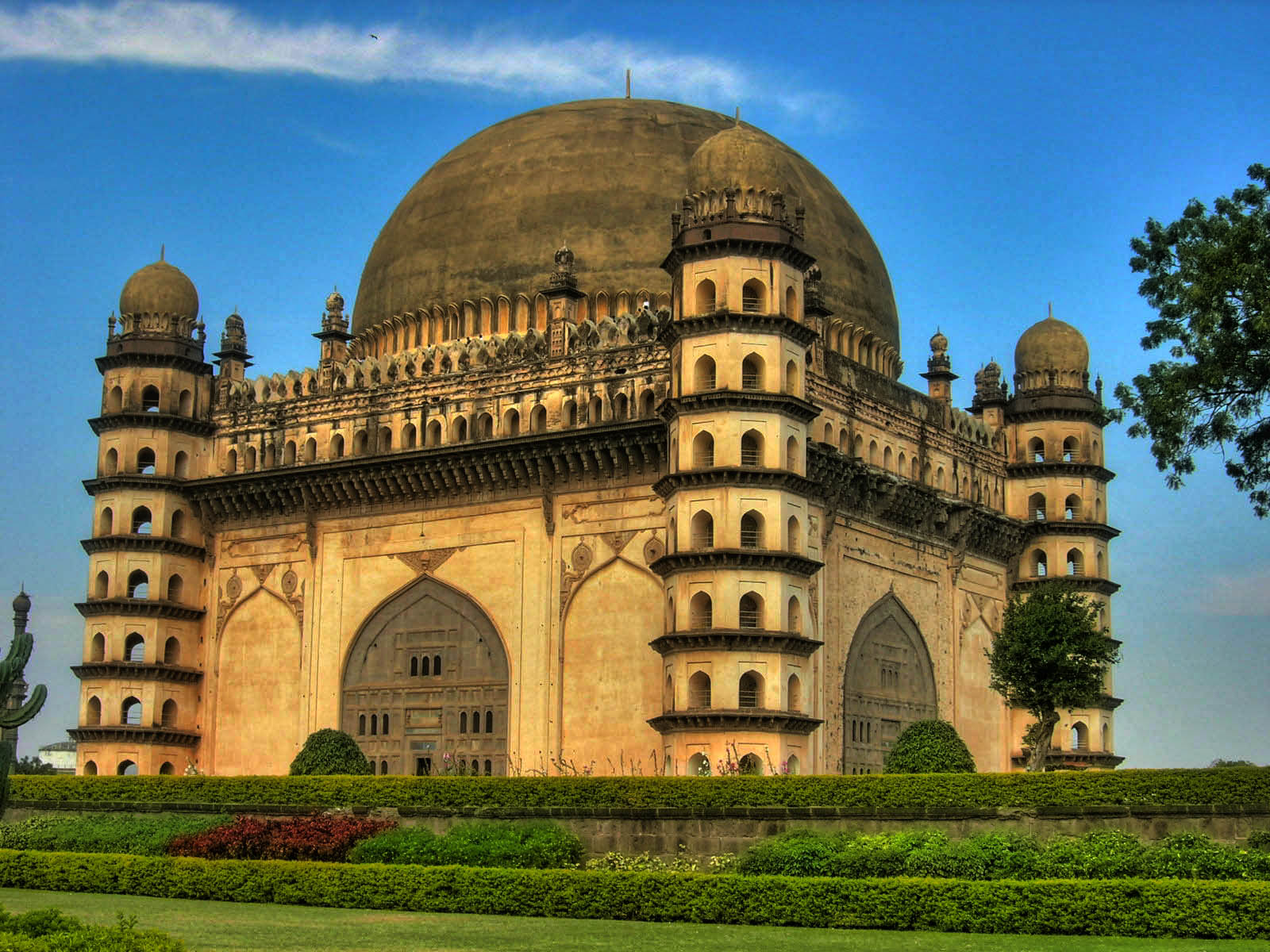
Gol Gumbaz, tomb of Mohammed Adil Shah, seventh Sultan of Bijapur

The Bahmani sultans of Bidar were the main competitors to the Vijayanagara empire for hegemony over the Deccan and after their fall, the Bijapur Sultanate and Bidar Sultanate took their place in the dynastic struggle for control of the southern India.

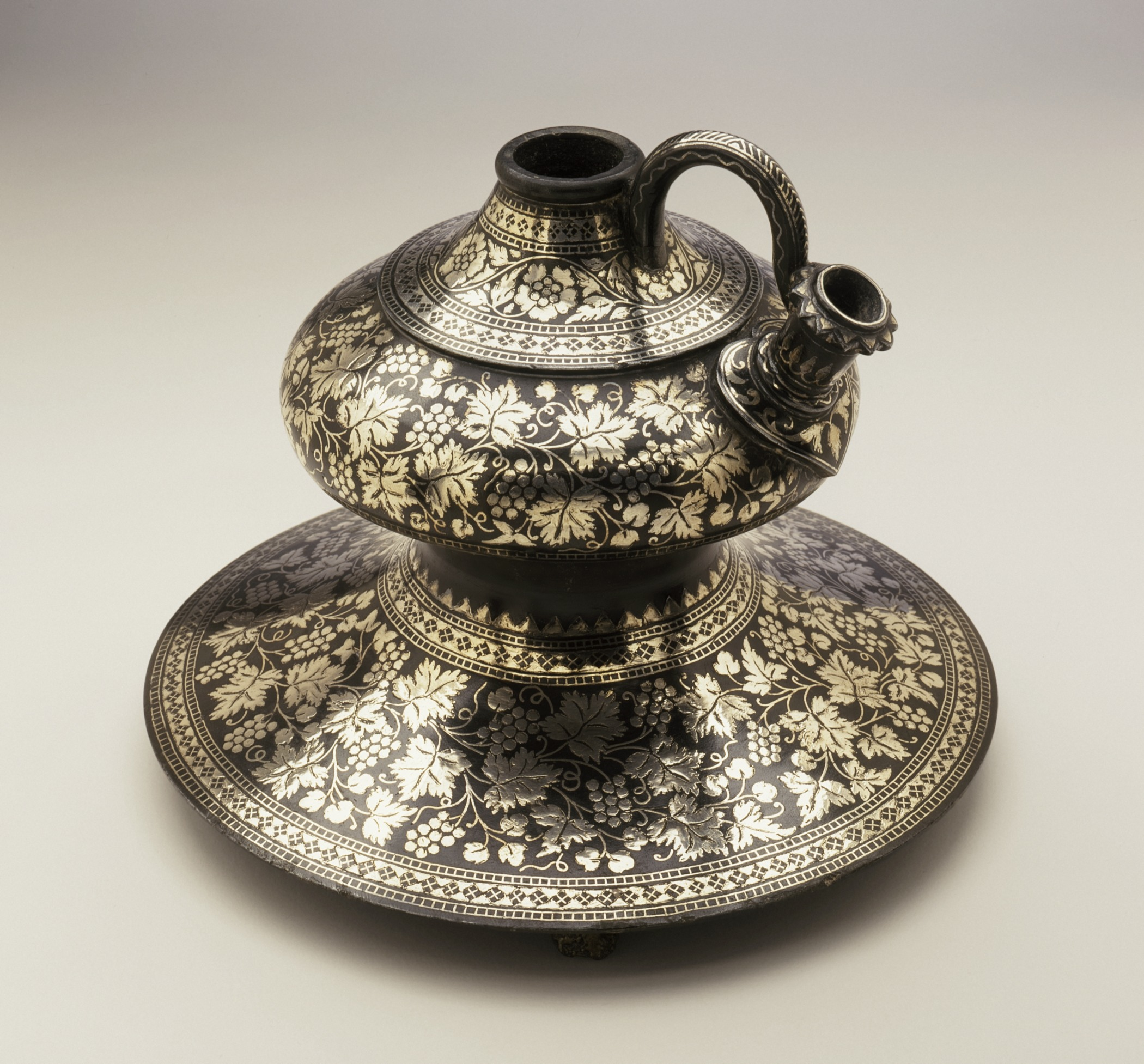
A Bidriware water-pipe. Bidriware was developed in Bidar in the 14th century C.E. during the rule of the Bahmani Sultanate.

After the defeat and disintegration of the Vijayanagara Empire in battle at Talikota in 1565 to a confederacy of Sultanates, the Bijapur Sultanate rose as the main power in the Deccan before their defeat to the Mughal Empire in late 17th century. Mughal Emperor Aurangzeb gave the order to besiege Bijapur and after a 15-month-long siege, the Mughal army emerged victorious and the Adil Shahi dynasty came to an end.

The Bahmani and Bijapur rulers encouraged Urdu and Persian literature and Indo Islamic architecture, the Gol Gumbaz being one of the high points of this contribution. Bidriware and Deccan painting developed during this period. The Madrasa Mahmud Gawan was a university built during the reign of the Bahmani Sultanate, one of the few centers of higher learning in medieval India.

== Maratha Era (1674–1818) ==
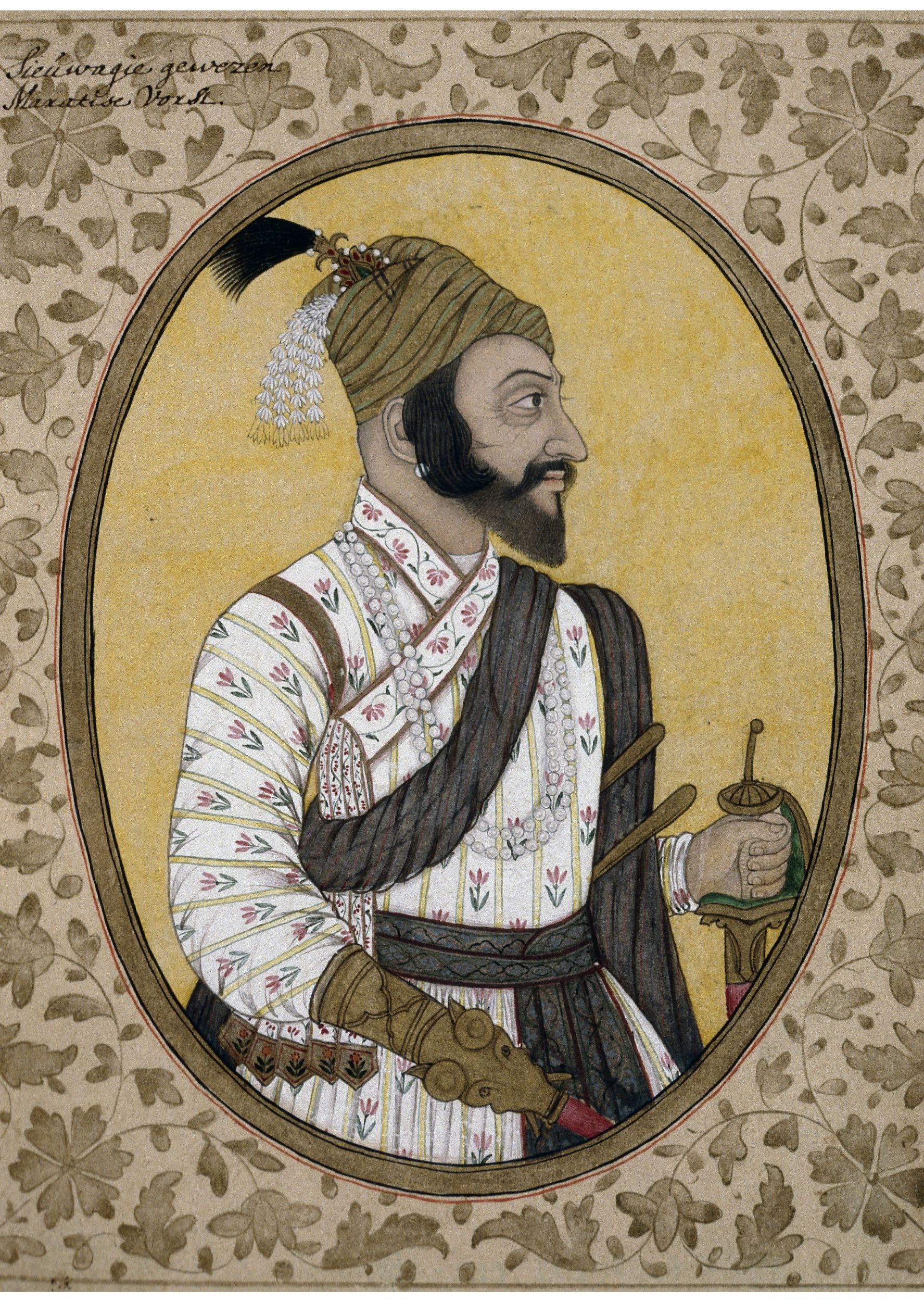
Chhatrapati Shivaji led the initial Maratha campaigns into Karnataka in the 1670s

Most of Karnataka was conquered by the Maratha Empire in the 17th and 18th centuries. The first expeditions were led by Chhatrapati Shivaji. After Shivaji's death in 1680, his son Chhatrapati Sambhaji inherited the throne of the Marathas. He ruled until his capture, torture, and execution by the Mughal emperor Aurangzeb in 1689. From this time until 1707, the war of 27 years was fought in the Deccan, including Karnataka. The Mughals raided the region several times but struggled in conquering the territory. The Maratha Empire continued to rule over the majority of Karnataka until the rise of Mysore in the 1760s and 1770s decades. Even after the Mysore-Maratha wars, the Marathas held onto the majority of Northern Karnataka until 1818.

== The Rise of Mysore ==
Map of the Kingdom of Mysore at its peak during the reign of Tipu Sultan

The Wodeyars of Mysore, former vassals of the Vijayanagara Empire, After the fall of vijayanagara empire Mysore became independent kingdom 17th-18th century. With the death of Krishnaraja Wodeyar II, Haider Ali, the Commander-in-Chief of the Mysore Army, assumed control over the region, until the rule of the kingdom was passed to Tipu Sultan, after Haider Ali's death. In attempting to contain European expansion in South India, Tipu Sultan, known as the Tiger of Mysore fought four significant Anglo-Mysore Wars, the last of which resulted in his death and the incorporation of Mysore into a princely state of the British Raj.

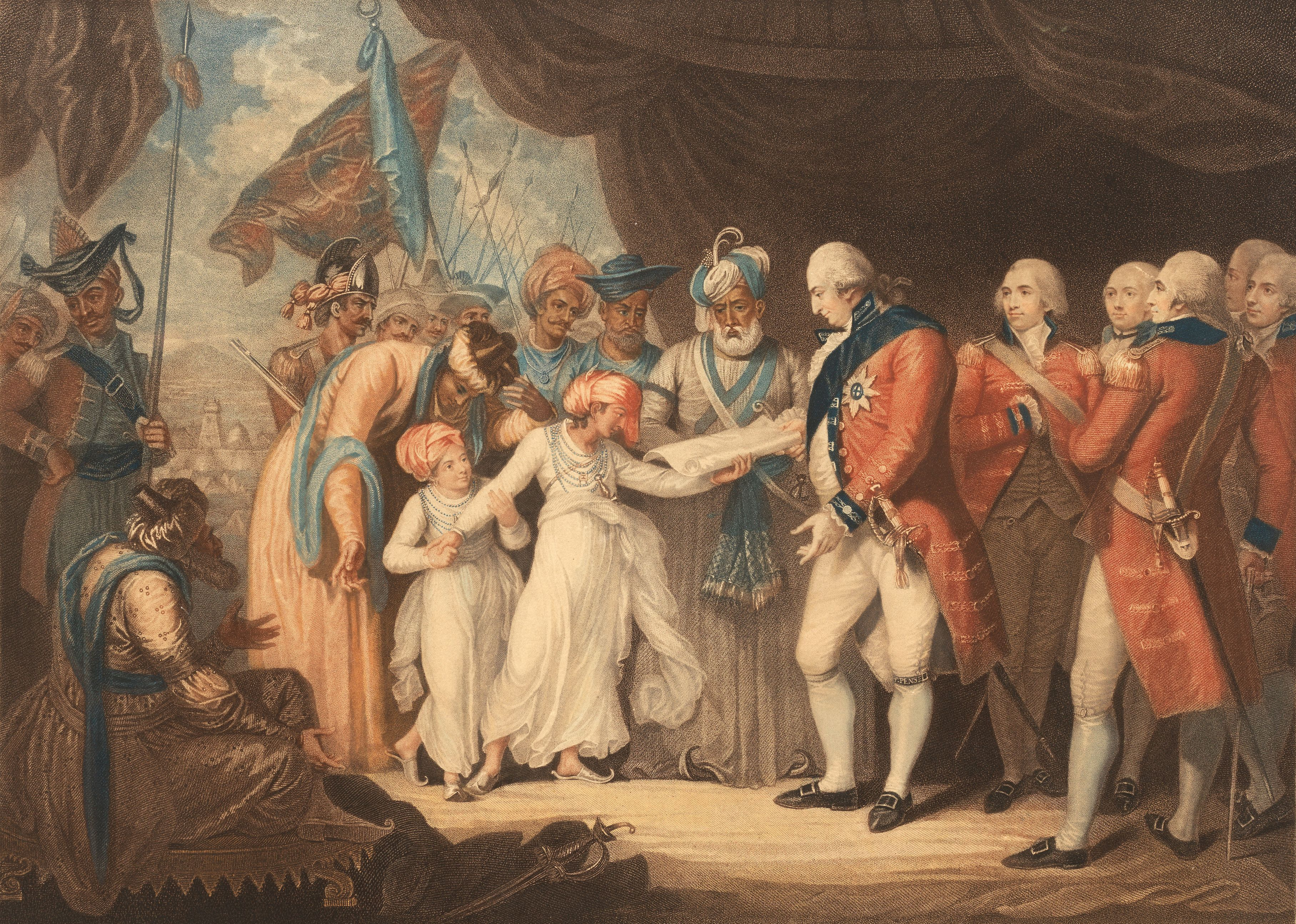
Lord Cornwallis receiving Tipu Sultan's sons as hostages on 26 February 1792 at the end of the Third Anglo-Mysore War

Following Tipu's fall, a part of the kingdom of Mysore was annexed and divided between the Madras Presidency and the Nizam. The remaining territory was transformed into a princely state; the five-year-old scion of the Wodeyar family, Krishnaraja III, was installed on the throne with chief minister (Diwan) Purnaiah.

The Mysore State and Hyderabad State, which ruled most of Karnataka by the mid-nineteenth century, were allied with the British during the Indian Rebellion of 1857.

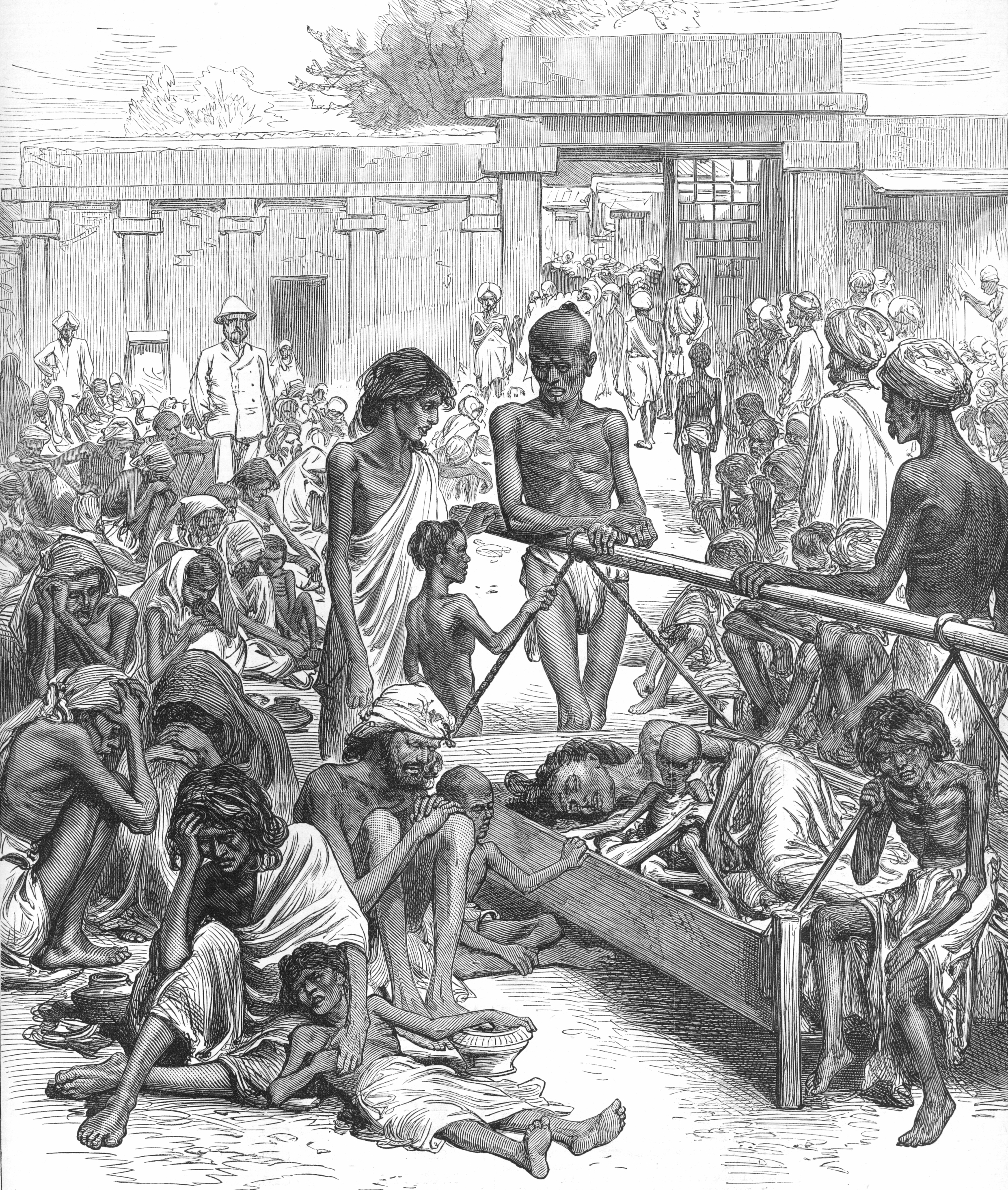
People waiting for famine relief in Bangalore. From the Illustrated London News. (20 October 1877)

=== British Protectorate ===
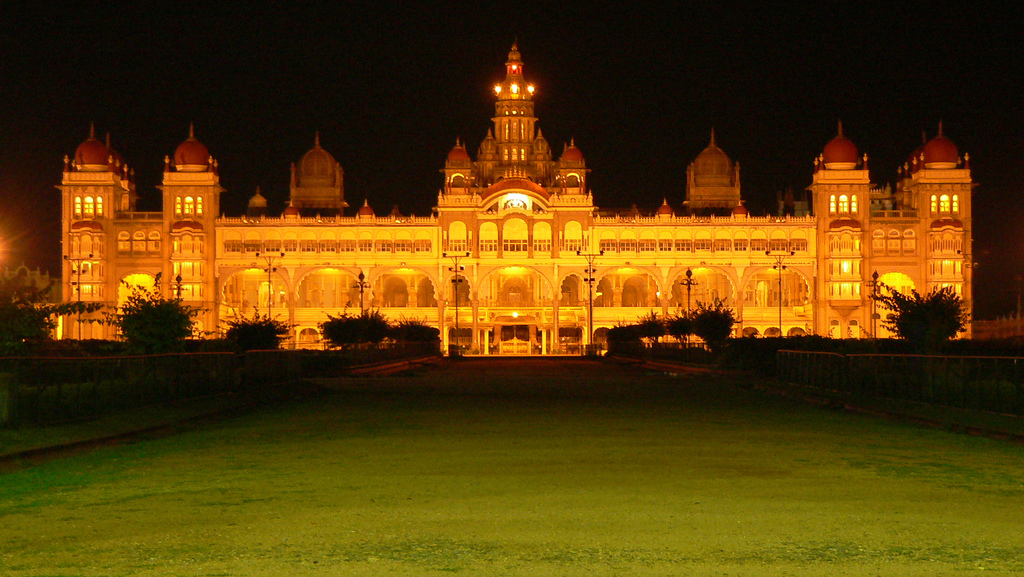
Mysore Palace, completed in 1912, was the residence of the Wadiyar dynasty which ruled the Kingdom of Mysore.

In 1799, the Kingdom of Mysore signed a Protectorate treaty with the British Empire. The British then helped the Wadiyar dynasty come back to power after 2 generations of Islamic rule. During this time, railways and airways, as well as modern universities were introduced in the Kingdom of Mysore, which was ruled by the Wadiyar dynasty. The Kingdom of Mysore became a princely state by this time. The Indian Institute of Science (1909) and University of Mysore (1916) were the first educational institutions established in Karnataka.

== Independence movement ==
By the late 19th century, the Indian independence movement against British rule in India had gained momentum; Aluru Venkata Raya, S. Nijalingappa, Kengal Hanumanthaiah, Nittoor Srinivasa Rau and others carried on the struggle into the early 20th century. Strong independence movements erupted across the regions of Karnataka under British direct rule.

=== Unification of Karnataka ===
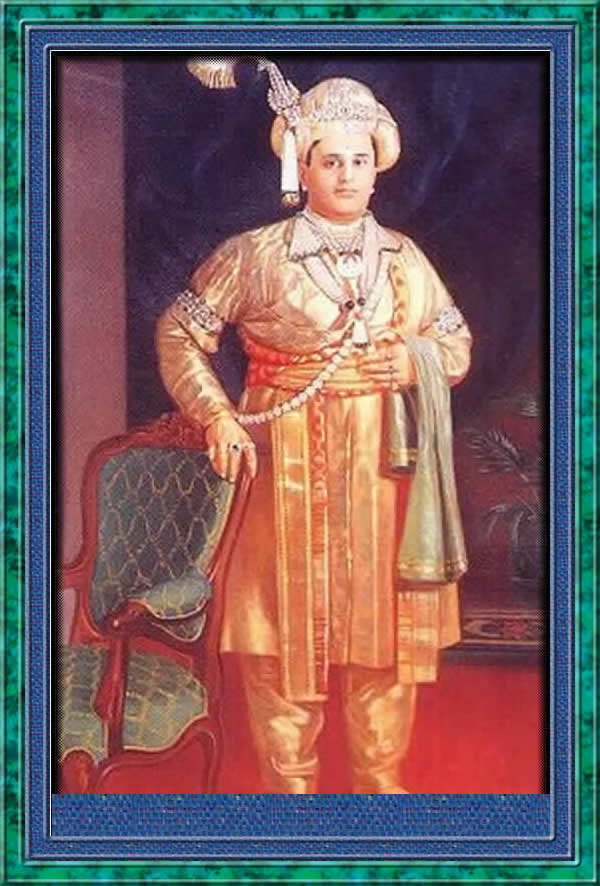
Jayachamaraja Wodeyar, the last ruling Maharaja of Mysore.

After Indian independence, the Wodeyar Maharaja acceded to India. In 1950, Mysore became an Indian state, and the former Maharaja became its rajpramukh, or governor, until 1975. The Ekikarana movement which started in the later half of the 20th century, culminated in the States Reorganisation Act of 1956 which provided for parts of Coorg, Madras, Hyderabad, and Bombay states to be incorporated into the state of Mysore. Mysore state was renamed Karnataka in 1973. The state of Mysore was formed on 1 November 1956 and since then 1 November of every year is celebrated as Kannada Rajyotsava / Karnataka Rajyotsava.

=== Post-unification ===
The 1957 elections saw the Indian National Congress win 150 seats out of 208, and S. Nijalingappa was retained as Chief Minister.

The Congress retained its power in Karnataka till 1983, when the Janata Party formed the first non-Congress government in Karnataka with the support of other smaller parties. Subsequent elections have seen power switch between the Congress, Bharatiya Janata Party, and other parties.
