= Kannada flag =

The Kannada flag (Kannada: ಕನ್ನಡ ಬಾವುಟ) is the de facto, linguistic, cultural and ethnic flag of the Kannadigas, an ethnic group in South India. The bicoloured flag has two equally divided horizontal bars, yellow above and red below. The yellow and red colours in the flag stand for Turmeric and Vermilion which signifies auspicious, well being, peace and courage also both colours represent Kumkuma, together they evoke Kannada culture, folk arts, festivals and temple traditions. The flag was designed by a Kannada activist and leader of Kannada Paksha Ma Ramamurthy. The flag is used across the world by Kannadigas for Kannada-centric programs and movements. The flag appears on the official website of the Government of Karnataka. It is also hoisted every year by the Chief Minister of Karnataka on Karnataka Rajyotsava day.

== History ==
The Kannada Movement, Chaluvali, is a result of various socio-political issues that rocked the capital in the early part of the 20th century. The British established the Cantonment and brought a large number of Tamils from the Madras province to work. When the plague killed a large number of people at the end of the 19th century, the two major textile mills in Bengaluru were closed down. After three decades, they were restarted and workers from Arcot were brought in. Added to that population were the officials in the British government who were all from Tamil Nadu. The local language was pushed to a corner as all of them were using their mother tongue.

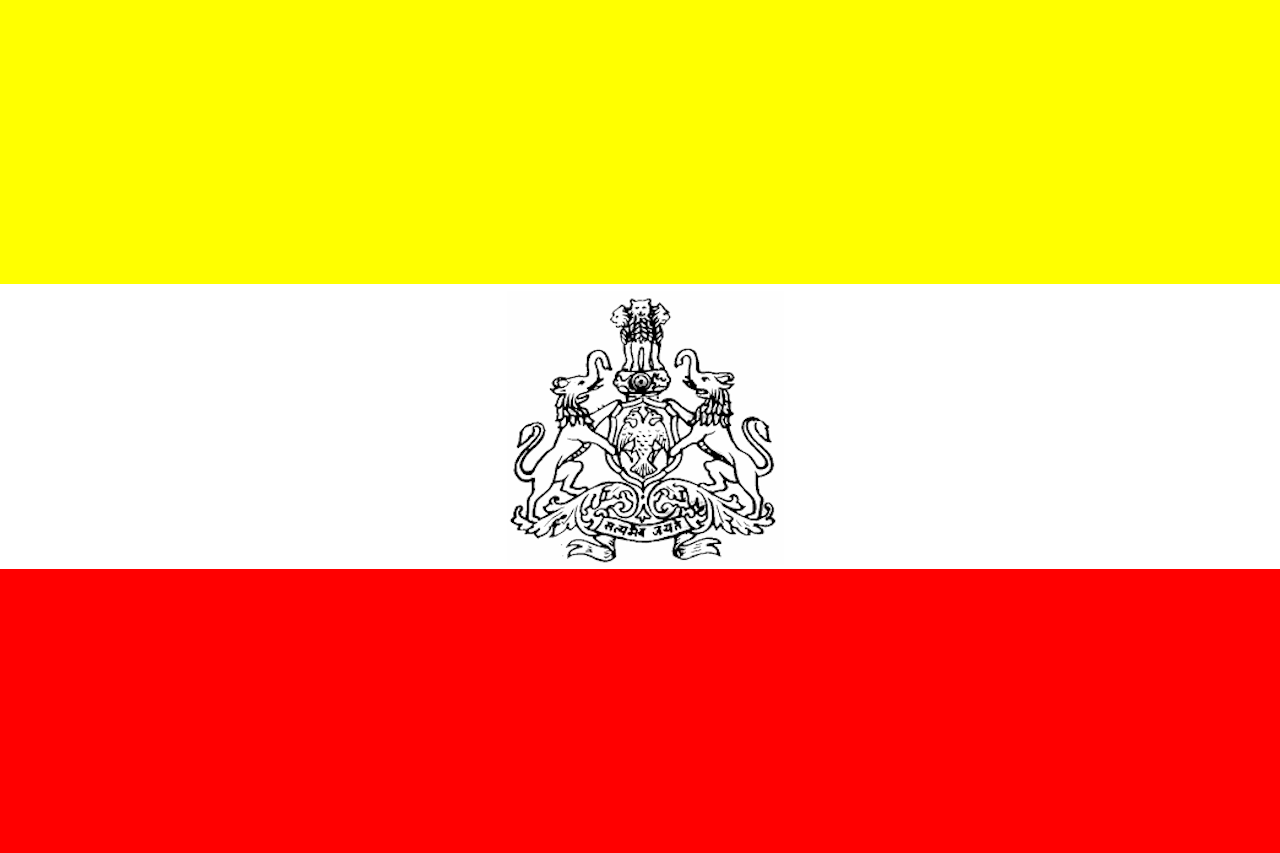
Karnataka flag proposed by the state government, inspired by the Kannada flag.

It was only in 1909 when Sir M Visveswaraya became the dewan that a Mysuru Economics Conference was established for integrated development of the Kingdom of Mysore and R H Deshpande, founder of Karnataka Vidhyavardhaka Sangha in Dharwad, suggested a Servants of Karnataka Society, similar to Servants of India Society to safeguard the interests of Kannada. This was the actual beginning of Karnataka Sahitya Parishat in 1915. Following an advertisement in the newspaper calling invitations from "painters for Bangalore municipality, knowledge of Tamil and Telugu compulsory" writer A N Krishna Rao and his band of faithful followers launched a Kannada movement.

In 1962, a Bengaluru Kannadiga conference was held at the Mysuru Commerce Bhavan inaugurated by Kengal Hanumanthaiah and attended by a number of stalwarts like Gubbi Veeranna, Khadri Shamanna, M Ramamurthy, Veerakesari Seetharama Shastri, who formulated several actions plans to safeguard Kannada in the capital. Gradually the movement took the momentum and several incidents during that time shed interesting insights. For instance, when the 1963 Tamil film Kaanchi Thalaivan showed the war between Chalukya and Pallava, a scene in which the king stamps on the Kannada flag, created a lot of dissentment among Kannada activists, and a special screening was arranged at Minerva theater for all writers, artists, eminent personalities to give their opinion. There were heated exchanges of words between the exhibitors and the people. But the result was the unification of Kannada activists. In 1964, the government declared a state holiday for a cricket match between MCC and Presidents’ XI and refused to declare 1 November a holiday. Protests and subsequent developments resulted in the Rajyotsava Day being declared a state holiday. M Ramamurthy went on a Padayatra, protesting against the hoisting of flags from neighboring state parties in the capital and soon he realized Kannadigas did not have a flag to hoist. He designed a flag that was yellow, a Karnataka map, and a paddy crown in the center. Since everybody wanted a simple flag, the current yellow and red flag was adopted.

The Kannada Movement also has seen several agitations like The Gokak Chaluvali, demand for Bengaluru Kannada TV channel and many others. In all these agitations, the Kannada flag has been the symbol of the unity of Kannadigas.

In 2009, B. S. Yeddyurappa, then Chief Minister of Karnataka, issued a circular enforcing restrictions on hoisting the Kannada flag on government buildings.

== See also ==
- Emblem of Karnataka
- Jaya Bharata Jananiya Tanujate
- National flag of India
