= R. B. Naik =

Speaker of Vidhan Parishad, Karnataka
- In office 26 September 1970 – 26 November 1970
- Preceded by: K. Subba Rao (acting)
- Succeeded by: Gudleppa Hallikeri

Chairman, Karnataka Legislative Council (acting)
- In office 16 August 1968 – 5 September 1968
- Preceded by: S. C. Adke
- Succeeded by: K. K. Shetty

Member, Karnataka Legislative Council
- In office 1966 – 26 November 1970

Personal details
- Born: Ramakrishna Beeranna Naik; 15 November 1904 Hiregutti, India
- Died: 26 November 1970 (aged 66) Bengaluru, Karnataka, India
- Party: Indian National Congress
- Profession: Lawyer

Ramakrishna Beeranna Naik (15 November 1904 – 26 November 1970) was an Indian politician who served as the chairman (Head of the Upper house) of the Karnataka Legislative Council Vidhan Parishad (1968 acting and 1970) of the Government of Karnataka, Bangalore.

R. B. Naik was born in Hiregutti village and completed his B.A. from the Wilson College, Mumbai and then his L.L.B. from the Government Law College, Mumbai. He was a lawyer by profession, a social worker and a politician by necessity. Naik was an active member of the Congress Party. As a Member of the Legislative Assembly, he was in Y B Chavan's government of the Bombay State. Naik died on job in 1970 and was laid to rest with State honors; the funeral services for Naik were held in Gokarna one of the holy cities of Hindus.
