= Pattabiramapuram =

Pattabiramapuram பட்டாபிராமபுரம் Paṭṭāpirāmapuram
- Town
- Location in Tamil Nadu, India Pattabiramapuram (India)
- Coordinates: 13.183338°N 79.629722°E
- Country: India
- State: Tamil Nadu
- District: Thiruvallur
- Elevation: 76 m (249 ft)

Population (2011)
  - Total: 3,874

Languages
  - Official: Tamil
- Time zone: UTC+5:30 (IST)
- PIN: 631209
- Telephone code: 044
- Vehicle registration: TN 20

Pattabiramapuram is a town in Thiruvallur District in the Indian state of Tamil Nadu. It is situated 2.9 km east of Tiruttani, on the NH 205 (Chennai-Anantpur national highway). It is 34 km away from Tiruvallur, 66 km away from Tirupati and 80 km away from Chennai.

== Population ==
As of 2011, the town's total population was 3,874 people, 1,941 male and 1,933 female. Of the 1,972 people (50.9%) who were employed, 614 were agricultural labourers; and 214 smallholders. The literacy rate was 73.17%.

== Economy ==
Pattabiramapuram is surrounded by Mel Vinayagapuram, Kel Vinayagapuram, Kasinathapuram, T-Puthur, Velancheri, and Methinipuram. Most of the inhabitants of the town depend on agriculture, with 60% of the inhabitants having their own jasmine farms. Other crops grown here include rice, sugar cane, peanuts (groundnuts) and vegetables.

== Education ==
Approximately 60% of the inhabitants of Pattabiramapuram have had some formal education. The town has facilities for higher education, with several educational institutions nearby, including Panchayat Union Middle School, Thalapathy Matriculation School, and colleges including the G.R.T group of institutions, and Arulmigu Subramaniya Swamy Government Art College and Tiruttani Polytechnic college.

== Facilities ==
The town features concrete roads and ensures a sustainable water and electricity supply. It is equipped with mobile communication towers and has a post office. Additionally, there is a recreation area with nearly 200 trees.

== Local administration area ==
The Pattabiramapuram panchayat (local administration area) covers the following towns and villages:

- Pattabiramapuram
- Mel Vinayagapuram
- Kel vinayagapuram
- Pattabiramapuram Arunthathiyar colony
- Pattabiramapuram Irular colony
- Kasinathapuram
- Kasinathapuaram colony
- Teachers Nagar

The president of Pattabiramapuram as of October 2011 is Mr. S. Dhenan. This panchayat is connected with the Tiruttani Panchayat Union.
