= National Highway 150A (India) =

National highway in India

National Highway 150A
- Map of National Highway 150A in red

Route information
- Auxiliary route of NH 50
- Length: 618 km (384 mi)

Major junctions
- North end: Jevargi
- NH 50 Terminal near Jewargi. NH 67 near Ballari. NH 544DD near Molakalmuru. NH 48 near Hiriyur. NH 69 near Huliyar. NH 73 near Kibbanahalli. NH 75 near Belluru Cross. NH 275 near Srirangapatna. NH 766 near Mysuru. NH 948 Terminal near Chamarajanagara.
- South end: Chamarajanagar

Location
- Country: India
- States: Karnataka and Andhra Pradesh

Highway system
- Roads in India; Expressways; National; State; Asian
← NH 50	→ NH 948

National Highway 150A (NH 150A) is a National Highway in Indian State of Karnataka. It is a spur road of National Highway 50. NH-150A traverses the states of Karnataka and Andhra Pradesh in India.

== Route ==
The northern terminus of NH 150A is a junction with NH 50 near Jevargi. The highway traverses southward through eastern Karnataka, briefly entering Andhra Pradesh before returning, down into southern Karnataka via Challakere. Its southern terminus is a junction with NH 948 near Chamarajanagar.

== Junctions ==
NH 50 Terminal near Jevargi.
NH 67 near Ballari.
NH 544DD near Molakalmuru.
NH 48 near Hiriyur.
NH 69 near Huliyar.
NH 73 near Kibbanahalli.
NH 75 near Belluru Cross.
NH 275 near Srirangapatna.
NH 766 near Mysuru.
NH 948 Terminal near Chamarajanagar.

== See also ==
- List of national highways in India
- List of national highways in India by state
