= Kaanchi Thalaivan =

- Theatrical release poster
- Directed by: A. Kasilingam
- Written by: M. Karunanidhi
- Produced by: M. Karunanidhi; A. Kasilingam; Murasoli Maran
- Starring: M. G. Ramachandran; S. S. Rajendran; P. Bhanumathi; M. R. Radha; S. A. Ashokan
- Music by: K. V. Mahadevan
- Production company: Mekala Pictures
- Distributed by: Emgeeyaar Pictures
- Release date: 26 October 1963
- Running time: 150 minutes
- Country: India
- Language: Tamil

Kaanchi Thalaivan (transl. Leader of Kaanchi) is a 1963 Indian Tamil-language historical action film, directed by A. Kasilingam and written by M. Karunanidhi. The film stars M. G. Ramachandran, S. S. Rajendran, P. Bhanumathi and C. R. Vijayakumari, with M. R. Radha and S. A. Ashokan as villains. It was produced by Karunanidhi, Kasilingam and Murasoli Maran under Mekala Pictures, and was released on 26 October 1963. The film elicited numerous controversies, and became a financial failure.

== Plot ==
The story is about the rivalry between the Pallavas and the Chalukyas, MGR as the Narasimha Pallava King, also known as Mamallan, rules Kanchipuram with peace, Pulikesi wants to capture Kanchipuram, with a cunning plan, sending Poovikraman and Chola Kumari to Kanchi. According to the plan, Poovikraman shall work as a sculptor in Kanchi and Chola Kumari as an official. Paranjothi arrests Chola Kumari and takes her to the court of Mamallan, there the King gives due respect and frees her. Meanwhile, Mamallan's friend Manavaraman (King of Ceylon) loses his crown, with his family comes to Kanchi to get the help from his friend, unfortunately the ship wrecks and his family is separated. Poovikraman had the opportunity to save the baby of Manavaraman and later his wife.

Poovikaraman asks Chola Kumari to invite Mamallan and poison him during the feast but she provokes the anger of Mamallan and makes him leave the party without taking the food. Later one of his spies informs him of her true identity.

Poovikaraman sends another girl in place of Manavarman's wife to Paranjothi, on the way she tries to seduce Paranjothi and gives an impression that Manavarman's wife is adulterous. Paranjothi mentions this to Mamallan in front of his friend Manavarman, Paranjothi is slapped by his King, Paranjothi's loyalty stays the same after this incident. Manavarman tries to kill his wife, but Mamallan plays a drama and finds out that the girl Paranjothi took with him is not the wife of Manavarman. Their friendship is renewed.

Though, Chola Kumari is against the wish of Pulikesi, her love to Mamallan creates a problem in the kingdom and Pallava's allies turn against him. The time was now ripe for Pulikesi to attack and hold Kanchi forever. Paranjothi too resigns from his post due to the love between the King and Chola Kumari. The King appoints Manavarman as his commander, due to this, his baby was slaughtered by Pulikesi. Initially, Kanchi loses some of its forts to Pulikesi.

Mamallan's sister, who is attached to Paranjothi, asks for his help, but he turns her down. She goes to the temple to pray, where Poovikraman plans to kill Mamallan. Before the explosives go off, Mamallan comes out of the temple, but his sister dies. Chola Kumari speaks with Pallava's allies and consents to their wish that she will not marry the Kanchi King. Now Paranjothi volunteers for the war and takes up the commanding position with Mamallan, Manavarman on one side and the allies of Kanchi on another side. They destroy the force of Pulikesi and he is later killed in the battle.

Finally Kanchi's allies changes their wish and ask Chola Kumari to marry Kanchi Thalaivan.

== Cast ==
- M. G. Ramachandran as King Narasimhavarman I / Mamallan
- S. S. Rajendran as Commander Paranjothi
- P. Bhanumathi as Chola Kumari
- M. R. Radha as Poovikraman / Madhanan
- S. A. Ashokan as Chalukya King Pulakeshin II
- C. R. Vijayakumari as Narasimha's sister Poongkuzhali
- 'Valayapathy' Muthukrishnan as Ceylon King Manavarman
- T. A. Madhuram as Bhairavi
- G. Sakunthala as Ceylon Queen Sangai
- D. V. Narayanasamy as Kollidakkarai King Mutharaiyar
- S. V. Ramadas
- Manorama as Singaari
- S. M. Thirupathisamy as Urayur Chola King
- T. V. Sivanandam as Kodumbalur King

== Production ==
Kaanchi Thalaivan was produced under Mekala Pictures by its screenwriter M. Karunanidhi, director A. Kasilingam and politician Murasoli Maran. The film was originally set to be produced by its lead actor M. G. Ramachandran under Emgeeyaar Pictures before Mekala Pictures took over. It was launched at Majestic Studios with the then chief minister C. N. Annadurai presiding over the event. Mahendran, who later became a successful screenwriter and director, worked as an assistant director for this film. Bajjaiah, an Andhra Pradesh-based police officer, was chosen for a wrestling scene as Ramachandran's opponent because of his tall height and numerous wrestling medals. Ramachandran, himself a skilled wrestler, lifted Bajjaiah above his head and threw him down, which Bajjaiah remarked was the first time that ever happened to him.

== Soundtrack ==
The music was composed by K. V. Mahadevan.

Song	Singers	Lyrics	Length
"Avani Ellam"	L. R. Eswari & S. V. Ponnusamy	Alangudi Somu	02:40
"Kan Kavarum Silaiye"	T. M. Soundararajan	K. D. Santhanam	03:26
"Makkal Oru"	T. M. Soundararajan	Alangudi Somu	03:11
"Mayangatha Manamyaavum"	P. Bhanumathi	Alangudi Somu	05:12
"Neermel Nadakkalam"	A. L. Raghavan & L. R. Eswari	M. Karunanidhi	03:07
"Ninaithu Vandha"	T. M. Soundararajan	Alangudi Somu	02:57
"Oru Kodiyil Iru Malargal"	T. M. Soundararajan & P. Susheela	Alangudi Somu	03:45
"Uyirai Tharukiren"	P. Susheela	Alangudi Somu	03:56
"Vaanathil Varuvathu"	T. M. Soundararajan & P. Susheela	Alangudi Somu	04:09
"Velga Naadu"	C. S. Jayaraman	M. Karunanidhi	03:25

== Release and reception ==
Kaanchi Thalaivan was released on 26 October 1963, by Emgeeyaar Pictures. Kalki praised the performances of the star cast and Karunanidhi's dialogues but felt the makers who handled famous historical characters could have invented a new story in a way that would give respect to femininity and masculinity, and pride to swords and shoulders and concluded it is regrettable that Kaanchi Thalaivan has nothing to boast about as a fantasy screenplay based on a heroic struggle from the historical era with many historical references. According to historian Randor Guy, the film had a limited run in theatres, of roughly seven weeks.

== Controversies ==
The censor board objected to the title Kaanchi Thalaivan as it was also a sobriquet for C. N. Annadurai, then general secretary of the Dravida Munnetra Kazhagam (DMK), but the producers refused to change the title. Nonetheless, as noted by historian R. L. Hardgrave, the board "so badly mangled the film that it was a financial failure". The film also courted controversy by portraying the Chalukya king as a buffoon and featured a scene of the Tamil king trampling upon the flag of the Chalukyas. This led to massive protests in Bangalore under the leadership of Kannada activist Ma Ramamurthy culminating into the need for the Kannada flag.
