= National Highway 544DD (India) =

National highway in India

National Highway 544DD
- Map of National Highway 544DD in red

Route information
- Auxiliary route of NH 44
- Length: 119 km (74 mi)

Major junctions
- East end: Anantpur
- West end: Molkalmuru

Location
- Country: India
- States: Andhra Pradesh, Karnataka

Highway system
- Roads in India; Expressways; National; State; Asian
← NH 44	→ NH 150A

National Highway 544DD, commonly called NH 544DD, is a national highway in India. It is a secondary route of National Highway 44. NH-544DD traverses the states of Andhra Pradesh and Karnataka in India.

== Route ==
Anantpur, Rayadurg, Molkalmuru, Hanagal.

== Junctions ==
NH 44 Terminal near Anantpur.
NH 150A Terminal Hanagal near Molkalmuru.

== See also ==
- List of national highways in India
- List of national highways in India by state
