= Gudleppa Hallikeri =

Chairman, Mysore Legislative Council
- In office 26 December 1970 – 15 May 1971
- Preceded by: R. B. Naik
- Succeeded by: S. D. Gaonkar
- In office 3 July 1962 – 13 May 1966
- Preceded by: H. F. Kattimani (pro tem)
- Succeeded by: Mahanta Shetty (acting)

Member, Mysore Legislative Council
- In office 1962–1972

Personal details
- Born: 6 June 1906 Hosaritti, Dharwad, Bombay Presidency (in present-day Haveri, Karnataka, India)
- Died: 1972 Hubli, Karnataka, India
- Resting place: Gandhi Grameena Gurukul, Hosaritti
- Party: Indian National Congress

Gudleppa Hallikeri (1906–1972) was an Indian freedom fighter who is a native of Hosaritti in Haveri district of Karnataka state. He started a residential school Gandhi Grameena Gurukul in Hosaritti.

Hallikeri worked with many other freedom fighters such as Mahatma Gandhi, Mailara Mahadevappa and Sanikoppa, using peace protests and non-violence. There is a larger than life iron wrought statue of Hallikeri in his final hometown, Hubli.

Hallikeri actively worked with Aluru Venkata Rao in the unification of Karnataka.

Karnatak Lingayat Education Society's Gudleppa Hallikeri Arts, Science & Commerce College in Haveri, is one of the colleges in North Karnataka, named after him.
