= Karnataka Rajyotsava =

Karnataka formation day

Karnataka Rajyostsava Kannada Rajyotsava Day Karnataka State Day
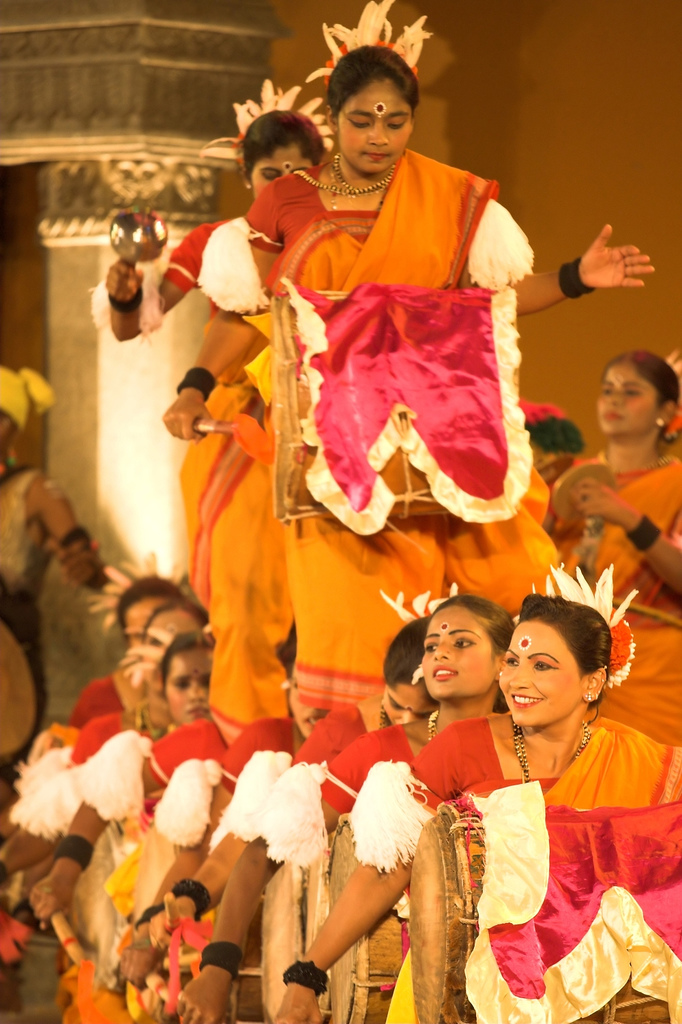
- Traditional dance of Dollu Kunitha in progress as part of Rajyotsava
- Also called: Kannada Rajyotsava, Karnataka Formation Day
- Observed by: Kannadigas in India and overseas
- Type: State
- Significance: Unification of Kannada-speaking regions of South India as the state of Karnataka
- Celebrations: Hoisting of Kannada flag, Processions, Cultural events, Rajyotsava Awards
- Begins: Every year 1 November
- Ends: 1 day after the start only in Karnataka State of India
- Date: 1 November
- Next time: 1 November 2027
- Frequency: annual

Karnataka Rajyotsava, also known as Karnataka State Day or Kannada Day amongst the Indian diaspora, is a public holiday celebrated annually on 1 November in the Indian state of Karnataka. It commemorates the merger in 1956 of the Kannada-speaking regions of southwestern India under the States Reorganisation Act to form the state in Bangalore.

Kannada Rajyotsava is listed as a government holiday in Karnataka and is celebrated by Kannadigas across the world. It is marked by the announcement and presentation of the honours list for Rajyotsava Awards by the government of Karnataka, the hoisting of the Karnataka flag with an address from the chief minister and governor of Karnataka, as well as community festivals, orchestra, Kannada book releases, and concerts.

== History ==
Aluru Venkata Rao was the first person who dreamt of unifying the State as early as 1905 with the Karnataka Ekikarana movement. In 1950, India became republic and different provinces were formed in the country on basis of language spoken in the particular region and this gave birth to the state of Mysore including various places in south India, which the kings earlier ruled. On 1 November 1956, Mysore state, comprising most of the area of the erstwhile princely state of Mysore, was merged with the Kannada-speaking areas of the Bombay and Madras presidencies, as also of the principality of Hyderabad, to create a unified Kannada-speaking sub-national entity. North Karnataka, Malnad (Canara), and old Mysore were thus the three regions of the newly formed Mysore state.

The newly unified state initially retained the name "Mysore", which was that of the erstwhile princely state which formed the core of the new entity. But the people of North Karnataka did not favour the retention of the name Mysore, as it was closely associated with the erstwhile principality and the southern areas of the new state. In deference to this logic, the state's name was changed to "Karnataka" on 1 November 1973. Devaraj Arasu was the Chief Minister of the state when this landmark decision was taken. Other people credited for the unification of Karnataka include littérateurs like K. Shivaram Karanth, Kuvempu, Masti Venkatesha Iyengar, A. N. Krishna Rao, and B. M. Srikantaiah.

== Celebrations of Karnataka Rajyotsava ==
The Kannada flag, used as an emblem of Kannada culture

Rajyotsava Day is celebrated throughout Karnataka. The entire state wears a festive look on this day as the red and yellow Kannada flags are hoisted at different strategic locations across the state and the Kannada anthem ("Jaya Bharatha Jananiya Tanujate") is chanted. The flag is hoisted at political party offices and several localities even as youth in many areas take out processions on their vehicles. Religion not being a factor, the Rajyotsava is celebrated by Hindus, Muslims, and Christians as well.

=== Government procession ===
The state government asserts the Rajyotsava awards and Karnataka Ratna on this day, which are awarded to people responsible for outstanding contributions in the development of Karnataka. The Chief Minister of the State inaugurates the cultural show which is customarily held at Kanteerava Stadium, Bangalore. Awards are presented to students who have won medals in various national games.

The celebrations are marked by multicoloured tableaux carrying the picture of the goddess Bhuvaneshwari mounted on a decorated vehicle. The colourful procession is also accompanied by performances of the folk artists in the fields of drama (Bayalata), traditional dance (Dollu Kunitha, Kamsale, Veeragase, Kolata), and classical Carnatic music.

=== Private establishments ===
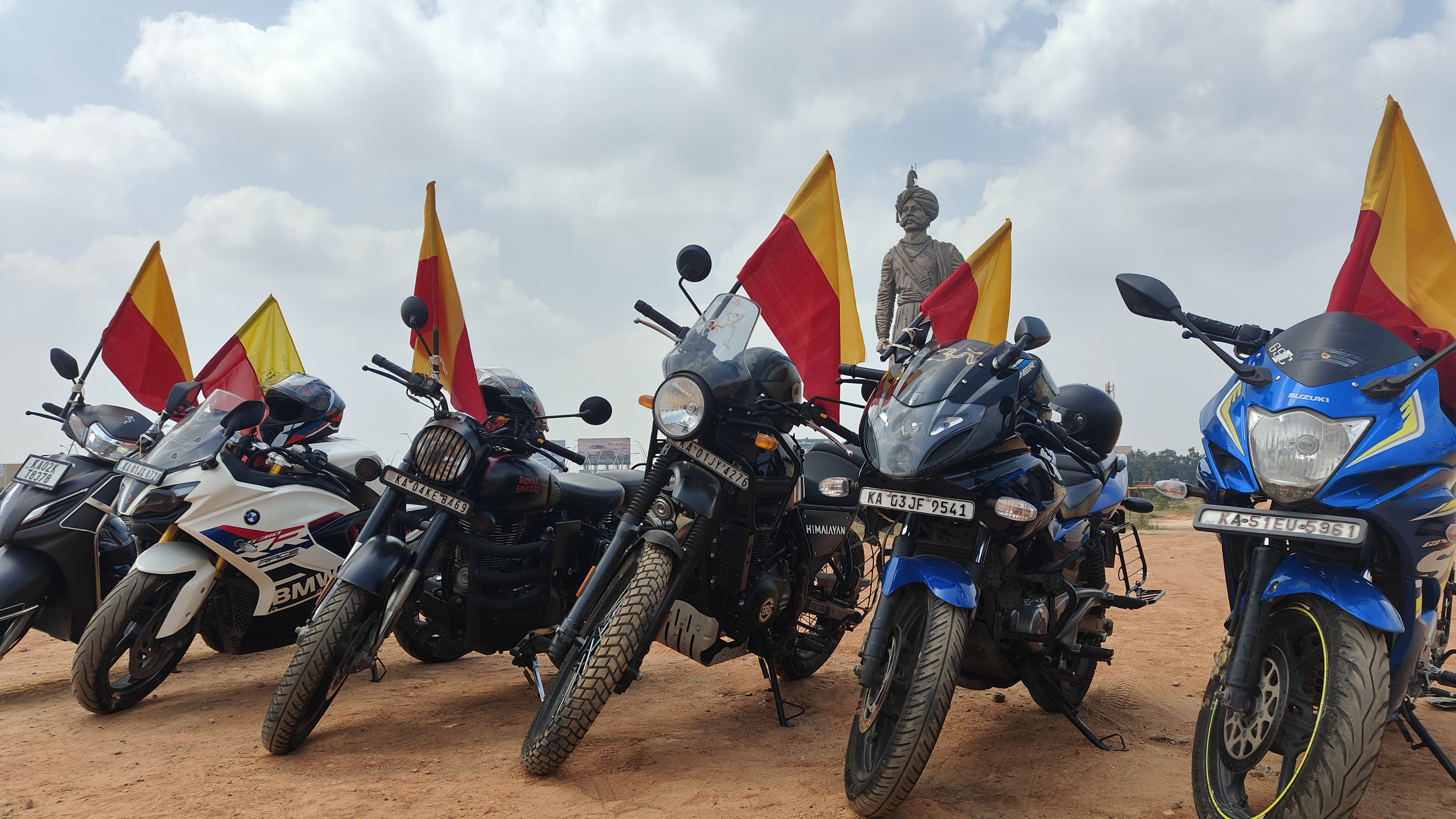
Motorcycles decorated with Kannada flags

Since 1 November is a public holiday, it is celebrated at commercial establishments on the following days of the week. Kannada flags are prominently hoisted and displayed at almost all office and business establishments across the city of Bengaluru. Being a hub of several IT companies, Bengaluru's major firms like TCS, IBM, Thomson Reuters, Wipro, Robert Bosch, SAP Labs, Accenture, Alcatel-Lucent, and Infosys encourage employees to showcase the local favour by holding cultural events. The IT crowd shows their support by wearing Kannada-themed T-shirts to workplaces. Educational institutions also hold such events at schools along with flag-hoisting and the rendering of naadageethe.

=== Non-resident Kannadigas ===
Apart from celebrations in Karnataka, it is also observed in other regions of India with significant Kannadiga population like Mumbai, New Delhi, Gurgaon, and Chennai. Overseas Kannada organisations also take part in the festivities by arranging cultural events in countries like the United States, the United Kingdom, Singapore, UAE, Qatar, Oman, South Korea, Australia, New Zealand, Scotland, Ireland, Netherlands, and Germany.

== See also ==
- Kerala Piravi, also celebrated on 1 November
