= Hosaritti =

Hosaritti Hosavrutti
- village
- Country: India
- State: Karnataka
- District: Haveri
- Talukas: Haveri

Population (2009)
  - Total: 8,500

Languages
  - Official: Kannada
- Time zone: UTC+5:30 (IST)
- PIN: 581213
- Telephone code: 08375
- Vehicle registration: KA - 27
- Nearest city: Haveri
- Literacy: 75%%
- Lok Sabha constituency: Haveri
- Vidhan Sabha constituency: Haveri
- Climate: Semi Dry (Köppen)

Hosaritti is a village in the southern state of Karnataka, India. It is located in the Haveri taluk of Haveri district in Karnataka.

Hosaritti is a hometown of the Great freedom fighter Gudleppa Hallikeri, who has started a residential school named Gandhi Grameena Gurukul in Hosaritti. This school is famous in North Karnataka region for quality education as per Gandhian Philosophy. It is also famous for Shree Guddalishwara Swami Mutt. Shri Dheerendra & Shri Sushilendra Swami Mutt. The Great Freedom Fighter Mylara Mahadevappa died fighting Britishers in Hosaritti. Hosaritti is also home for many freedom fighters. Freedom fighter, Mahatma Gandhi Seva 2016 awardee Chennamma Hallikeri is from this village. The Village is situated on the banks of Varada River. Tungabhadra River is also just 15 km from this village.

Guddalishwara Swamiji jatra is held every year in the month of January. Kadubina kalaga held on the last day of the jatra is a unique ritual, Swamiji distributes sugarcane as prasad to the devotees on the main streets of the village by riding horse. There will be devotees from all parts of Karnataka to witness this special event and have the blessings and prasada from Swamiji.

== Demographics ==
As of the 2001 India census, Hosaritti has a population of 5713, of which 3065 are males and 2648 are females.

== Agriculture ==
Agriculture is one of the main sources of occupation. Jowar, Maize, Sunflower, Cotton, Chillies, Groundnuts are some of the major crops. Horticulture is also taking good shape with Guava, Mango, Chikoo, etc.

== See also ==
- Haveri
- Districts of Karnataka
