= Belluru Cross =

Belluru Belluru Cross B.G Nagara
- Village
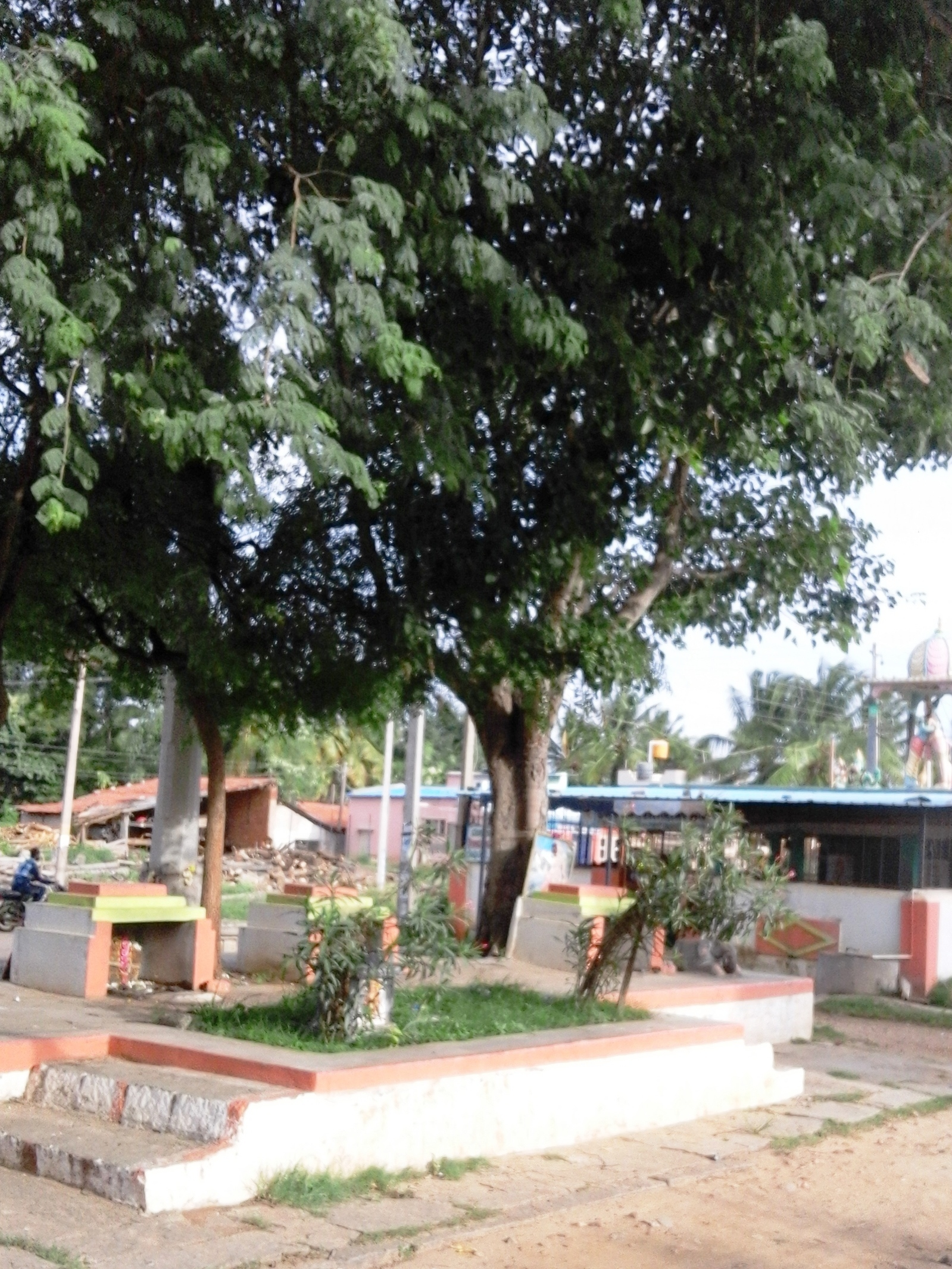
- Anjaneya Temple, Belluru Cross
- Interactive map of Belluru
- Coordinates: 12°59′N 76°45′E
- Country: India
- State: Karnataka
- District: Mandya
- Taluka: Nagamangala

Government
  - Body: Grama Panchayath

Area
  - Total: 9 km^{2} (3.5 sq mi)

Population (2011)
  - Total: 7,412
  - Density: 820/km^{2} (2,100/sq mi)

Languages
  - Official: Kannada
- Time zone: UTC+5:30 (IST)
- PIN: 571418
- Vehicle registration: KA-54

Belluru is a village in the southern state of Karnataka, India. It is located in the Nagamangala taluk of Mandya district in Karnataka.

The village has an ancient temple of Adi Madavaraya, (Vishnu). Said to be constructed during Saint Ramanujacharya stay in Melkote.

== Location ==
Belluru is located between Nagamangala and Adichunchanagiri Hills.

By road, Bellur village is located 2.5 km north of Bellur Cross, which lies on National Highway 75. Bellur Cross lies at the junction where NH-75 meets NH-150A.

The nearest railway station is in Bala Gangadharanatha Nagara a.k.a. B.G Nagar (Station Code: BGNR) Railway station.

== Overbridge ==
The Belluru over-bridge separates the Tumkur-Mysore road from the Bangalore-Mangalore road.

== Demographics ==
As of 2001 India census, Belluru had a population of 6823 with 3581 males and 3242 females.

== Tourist attractions ==
- Pink Palace
- Adichunchanagiri Hills
- Anjaneya Temple, Bellur Cross
- Adi Madavaraya temple
- Doddamma devi and Ranganatha swamy temples, Vaddarahalli

== Educational Institutions ==
- Navodaya International School
- AIMS

== See also ==
- Mandya
- Districts of Karnataka
