= Patil Puttappa =

Indian writer (1921–2020)

- Born: 14 January 1921; Halageri, India
- Died: 16 March 2020 (aged 99); Karnataka Institute of Medical Sciences, Hubli, India
- Citizenship: Indian
- Education: Journalism from University of California, Los Angeles
- Alma mater: UCLA School of Journalism
- Occupations: Writer and Journalist
- Spouse: Mrs. Indumati Patil
- Writing career
- Notable awards: Nadoja Award from Kannada University
- Literary movement: Kannada Language Movement

Patil Puttappa (14 January 1921 – 16 March 2020) was an Indian writer, veteran journalist and activist based in Hubli, India. He was the founder-editor of the now-defunct Kannada daily Vishwavani and weekly Prapancha.

Patil Puttappa hails from Kurubagonda village near Halageri, which was in the then undivided Dharwad district, now Haveri district of Karnataka in a family of Lingayata tradition.

Puttappa, was in the forefront of the agitation in the late 1940s and 1950s demanding the unification of areas where Kannadigas were in a majority. He was the president of the Dharwad-based Karnataka Vidyavardhaka Sangha for over 30 years. He represented the State in the Rajya Sabha for two terms (1962 to 1974). He was also the first president of the Kannada Watchdog Committee that was later renamed as the Kannada Development Authority.

Puttappa was President of the 70th Kannada Sahitya Sammelana held at Belgaum in 2003. Puttappa also spoke at the valedictory function of the second World Kannada Meet (Vishwa Kannada Sammelana) held in Belgaum.

He held a master's degree in Journalism from California State University in 1949.

Patil Puttappa's last rites were held according to the Lingayat tradition, which indicates his religious background.

== Publications ==
He has authored many Kannada language books such as

- Karnatakada Kavi Lekhakaru
- Karnataka Sangeetha Kalaratnaru
- Badukalu Beku Badukuva Ee Maathu
- Neevu Nagabeku
- Nenapina Butti
- Mathu Manikya
- Kannadada Kampu
- Suvarna Karnataka
- Pustaka Samskriti

== Awards ==
- Nadoja Award - Kannada University
- Nrupatunga award - 2008, Literary award By Karnataka Sahitya Parishat
- Wooday award - 2010
