= Ma Ramamurthy =

Indian writer, journalist and Kannada activist

- Born: 11 March 1918; Nanjangud, British India
- Died: 25 December 1967 (aged 49); Thalaghattapura, Karnataka, India
- Education: Arya Vidyashala, Bengaluru
- Occupations: Writer, journalist and social activist
- Notable work: Kannada flag
- Movement: Kannada movement
- Spouse: Kamalamma (m. 1942)

Ma Ramamurthy (1918–1967) also known as Kannadada Veera Senani, was an Indian writer, journalist and Kannada activist. He is often considered as a commander of Kannada movement in 1960s. Ramamurthy is known for designing the red-and-yellow arishina-kumkuma (turmeric-vermilion) Kannada flag.

== Life ==
Ma Ramamurthy was born at Nanjangud into a Brahmin family. His father Veerakesari Seetharama Shastri was a noted freedom fighter and litterateur.

Ramamurthy led the Kannada movement from the front in the 1950s and 1960s under the leadership of A. N. Krishna Rao and others.

He died in late 1967 in an accident when mud caved in onto him and two of his sons in a newly dug well in their field.

== Commemoration ==
A locality in Bangalore called Ramamurthy Nagar was named after him.

== Notes ==
- Candraśēkhara, Rā. Naṃ (2018). Kannada veera senani M. Ramamurthy's centenary memoir volume. Kannaḍa Sāhitya Pariṣattu.
