= R H Deshpande =

Indian educationist and activist (1861–1931)

R. H. Deshpande
- ರಾಮಚಂದ್ರ ಹಣಮಂತರಾವ್ ದೇಶಪಾಂಡೆ
- Born: Ramachandra Hanamantha Rao Deshpande; 21 March 1861; Narendra, Dharwad district, Bombay Presidency, British Raj
- Died: 25 June 1931 (aged 70); Dharwad, Bombay Presidency, British Raj
- Other name: M. A. Deshpande
- Education: Deccan College, Pune; University of Bombay (B.A., M.A.)
- Occupations: Educationist; author; activist
- Known for: Founding the Karnataka Vidyavardhaka Sangha; Coining the motto "Sirigannadam Gelge"; Pioneering the Karnataka unification movement

Ramachandra Hanamantha Rao Deshpande (21 March 1861 – 25 June 1931), commonly known as R. H. Deshpande or M. A. Deshpande, was an Indian educationist, author, and Kannada cultural activist. He was the principal founder and first secretary of the Karnataka Vidyavardhaka Sangha, established in Dharwad in 1890 to protect and promote the Kannada language and literature. Deshpande was the first individual from the Kannada-speaking region of the Bombay Presidency (Bombay Karnataka) to obtain a Master of Arts degree. He is also credited with coining the prominent Kannada cultural motto Sirigannadam Gelge ("May glorious Kannada triumph"), which became a defining slogan of modern Kannada linguistic identity.

== Early life and education ==
Deshpande was born on 21 March 1861 in the village of Narendra, located in the Dharwad district, into a family of hereditary landholders (vatandars). Considered a talented student, he pursued his education in Dharwad and Pune, completing his Master of Arts examination with distinction. For his academic performance, he was awarded the Robertson Gold Medal and a prize of 1,000 rupees. As the first person from the Bombay Karnataka region to earn an M.A. degree, he came to be known locally as "M. A. Deshpande".

== Career in the Education Department ==
In 1884, Deshpande was recruited into the Education Department of the Bombay Presidency by W. A. Russell, the Educational Inspector for the Southern Division. He was initially appointed Assistant Headmaster at the Sardar High School in Belgaum, and in May 1885 was appointed Deputy Educational Inspector in Karwar. Over his career in the department, Deshpande served as Deputy Educational Inspector, Principal of the Men's Training College in Dharwad, official Kannada translator, and member of the textbook revision committee. During this period, administration and government schooling across Bombay Karnataka were predominantly conducted in the Marathi language, despite the majority of the population speaking Kannada. Deshpande actively campaigned for Kannada-medium instruction and textbooks, facing administrative friction and frequent transfers across the province before retiring in 1914. Following his retirement, M. Visvesvaraya, then serving as Dewan of Mysore, invited Deshpande to take up an educational post in the Kingdom of Mysore. Deshpande declined the offer in order to devote his time to writing Kannada historical and educational works from Dharwad.

== Karnataka Vidyavardhaka Sangha ==
In 1890, Deshpande led the initiative to establish a dedicated cultural body to promote Kannada language and literature in northern Karnataka. On 20 July 1890, a meeting was convened in Dharwad, resulting in the establishment of the Karnataka Vidyavardhaka Sangha. Deshpande was appointed its first honorary secretary, with Shamrao Vithal Kaikini serving as the inaugural president. Under the Sangha, Deshpande helped organize book publication schemes, Kannada classes, and the literary monthly journal Vagbhushana, launched in 1896. The Sangha received patron support from the Maharaja of Mysore, Chamarajendra Wodeyar X, who assisted with funds for premises and sent examiners to conduct Kannada examinations in Dharwad.

He also enlisted the cooperation of prominent European scholars of Kannada for the Sangha, including Ferdinand Kittel and B. L. Rice. The Karnataka Vidyavardhaka Sangha organized an all-Karnataka writers' conference in Dharwad in 1907. In May 1915, Deshpande attended a conference of Kannada writers convened in Bangalore with the support of the Mysore government, which led to the founding of the Kannada Sahitya Parishat. In October 1917, the Sangha passed a resolution advocating for the unification of all contiguous Kannada-speaking areas into a single administrative province, making Deshpande's work a foundation of the Karnataka unification movement.

== The "Sirigannadam Gelge" motto ==
Deshpande originated the phrase Sirigannadam Gelge (ಸಿರಿಗನ್ನಡಂ ಗೆಲ್ಗೆ, meaning "May glorious Kannada triumph"), which was later popularized across southern Karnataka by poet B. M. Srikantaiah and became a defining slogan of modern Kannada identity.

== Literary works ==
Deshpande authored more than thirty books in Kannada, focusing primarily on history and biography. His major work was Karnataka Samrajya ("The Empire of Karnataka"), a multi-volume history of regional dynasties whose first two volumes, covering history up to the Badami Chalukyas, were published in 1926. His other biographical and historical works include:

- Chhatrapati Shivaji Maharaj (1923), on Shivaji
- Akbar Charitre, on the Mughal Emperor Akbar
- Chaitanya Charitre, on the saint Chaitanya Mahaprabhu
- Tipu Sultan Charitre, on Tipu Sultan
- Ranjit Singh Charitre, on Maharaja Ranjit Singh
