= Mysore (disambiguation) =

Mysore is a city in Mysore district, and its administrative seat.

Mysore also refers to:

== Places ==
=== Inhabited places ===
- Kingdom of Mysore, a kingdom founded about 1400 CE by the Wodeyar dynasty
- Mysore State, the name of Karnataka before 1973
- Mysore division, in the southern Indian state of Karnataka
  - Mysore district, in Mysore division for administrative purposes
- Mysore (Lok Sabha constituency), in Karnataka, for electoral purposes
- Mysore railway division, in India
- Mysore (region), an unofficial region in the state of Karnataka
- Mysore Circuit, a Hindi film distribution circuit, comprising areas of the former Mysore State in Karnataka
- Mysore East, a suburb of Mysore in Karnataka province, India
- Mysore North, a cluster of suburbs Mysore in Karnataka province, India
- Mysore South, a cluster of suburbs Mysore in Karnataka province, India

=== Other places ===
- University of Mysore, a public university in Karnataka
- Mysore Palace, a palace in Mysore, Karnataka
- Mysore Plateau, a geographically unique region of Karnataka, India

== Transportation ==
- INS Mysore (C60), a Crown Colony class light cruiser, the former HMS Nigeria, commissioned into the Indian Navy in 1957
- INS Mysore (D60), a 1993 Delhi-class destroyer of the Indian Navy built in India

== Military ==
- Mysore (129), a Royal Air Force squadron active during World War II
- Mysore (1789–91), the action of native units of the British East India Company in the Third Anglo-Mysore War of 1789–92
- Anglo-Mysore Wars, a series of wars fought in the 18th century between the Kingdom of Mysore and the British East India Company
  - First Anglo-Mysore War
  - Second Anglo-Mysore War
  - Third Anglo-Mysore War
- Mysorean rockets, rockets used during Anglo-Mysore Wars

== Other uses ==
- Mysore pak, a sweet dish of Karnataka made of ghee (clarified butter), sugar and chick pea (besan) flour
- Mysore style, a style of yoga
- Mysore painting, a form of classical South Indian painting that originated in Mysore
- Mysore Dasara, the state festival of Karnataka
- Mysore Vasudevachar (1865–1961), an Indian musician and composer of Carnatic music
- Venky Mysore, Indian business executive
