= Unification of Karnataka =

Formation of the Indian state of Karnataka

Present map of Karnataka. Only South Karnataka was Mysore State from 1947 to 1956.

The Unification of Karnataka or Karnataka Ekikarana refers to the formation of the Indian state of Karnataka (then named Mysore State) in 1956 when several Indian states were created by redrawing borders based on linguistic demographics. Decades earlier during British rule, the demand for a state based on Kannada demographics had been made.

== Historical background ==
Territories before unification

During the period of British rule, areas that now comprise Karnataka were under as many as 20 different administrative units with the princely state of Mysore, Nizam's Hyderabad, the Bombay Presidency, the Madras Presidency and the territory of Kodagu being the most important ones. In effect, nearly two-thirds of what is now Karnataka fell outside the rule of the Wodeyar kings of Mysore.

This meant that the Kannadigas in these regions, in spite of their large numbers, did not have an administrative patronage. Kannadigas in the Hubli-Karnataka region for example, came under the rule of the Bombay Presidency where Marathi was the official language. Those in the Hyderabad-Karnataka region came under the Nizam's rule where Urdu was the main language. Kannadigas in South Canara came under the rule from the Madras Presidency which used Tamil as their main language.

Under these conditions, a feeling of discontent began among Kannadigas outside Mysore. Thus, while the Kannadigas under the Nizam felt that Urdu was being forced on them at the expense of Kannada, those in the Bombay Presidency felt similarly concerning Marathi. These areas also remained economically undeveloped. It was in these conditions that the movement that first started as a protest against linguistic oppression, began demanding the creation of a separate state consolidating all Kannada-speaking regions. This was called the Ekikarana or 'Unification' movement.

== Role of North Karnataka ==
Almost the entire southern half of Karnataka was then under the Wodeyars of Mysore with Nalvadi Krishnaraja Wodeyar. The official language of the state was Kannada and the state was also one of the more progressive states of the day. Important protagonists of the Ekikarana movement including Aluru Venkata Rao were from northern parts of Karnataka. One of the earliest and most important organisations that was chosen to lead the movement, the Karnataka Vidyavardhaka Sangha also began in Dharwad.

== The Vidyavardhaka Sangha and other organisations ==
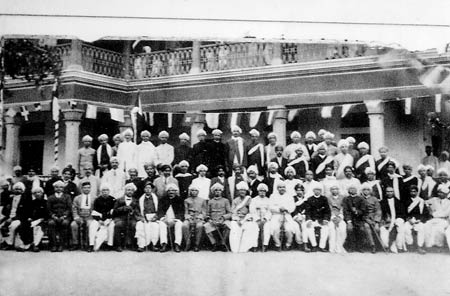
Participants of the first Kannada Sahitya Parishat

The Karnataka Vidyavardhaka Sangha, Dharwad, was established in 1890. It was established by R H Deshpande with the objective of working for the resurgence of the Kannada language which had been marginalised under the rule of the Bombay Presidency where Marathi was the official language. The Vidyavardhaka Sangha became the aegis under which leaders from all over Karnataka gathered to further their agitation. The influence and success of the Vidyavardhaka Sangha soon lead to more such organisations being set up throughout Karnataka. The most notable of these were the Kannada Sahitya Parishat (Bangalore) that was set up in 1915, the Karnataka Sangha (Shivamogga) that began in 1916.

== Aluru Venkata Rao ==
Although resentment and protest had started as early as in 1856 and the Karnataka Vidyavardhaka Sangha had been established in 1890, the movement took a dramatic turn with the arrival of Aluru Venkata Rao on the scene. Speaking at a meeting of the Sangha in 1903, Alur Venkata Rao made a case for integrating all Kannada regions of Madras Province and north Karnataka with Mysore kingdom. Aluru himself was inspired by the protests that followed the British partitioning of Bengal.

In 1907 and again in 1908, Rao organised the All-Karnataka Writers' Conference in Dharwad. Inspired by the Vidyavardhaka Sangha and the efforts of Deshpande, Aluru helped found the Kannada Sahitya Parishat in Bangalore in 1915. This Parishat found a patron in the ruler of Mysore. The Parishat began holding annual literary conferences (that continue today) in different parts of the state. Intellectuals from across the Kannada speaking regions attended these conferences. During the Home Rule Movement, Aluru floated the idea of a Karnataka 'Provincial' unit of the Indian National Congress. This soon took shape and the Karnataka Pradesh Congress committee was formed.

=== Karnataka Gatha Vaibhava ===
Amidst all this, Aluru published his most renowned achievement, the Karnataka Gatha Vaibhava in initially published in 1912, later some sources added the publication of the book in the year 1917. Karnataka Gatha Vaibhava literally means The glory that was Karnataka!. It was a book that recounted in detail the history of Karnataka until the fall of Vijayanagar after which the Marathas, Nizam and the British took over. The book impacted the young and old alike. The movement soon caught the imagination of the public and people started rallying around the Ekikarana movement and the movement picked up momentum. For all these efforts and for being the one who inspired a whole movement, Aluru is today remembered as the Kannada Kula Purohita or the 'High priest of the Kannada clan'.

== Growth of the movement ==
Starting with Aluru's call for a Kannada linguistic state, the movement had slowly started gaining momentum and following. It was also around the time that the Indian independence movement was gathering momentum. Organisations in the movement began organising rallies, talks and conferences where demands for a separate state for Kannada speaking people was made.

Apart from Aluru, supporters like Gudleppa Hallikeri, Siddappa Kambli, R H Deshpande, Rangarao Diwakar, Koujalgi Srinivasarao, Srinivas Rao Mangalvedhe, A. J. Doddameti, Kengal Hanumanthaiah, Gorur Ramaswamy Iyengar, S Nijalingappa, T Mariyappa, Subramanya, Sowcar Chennaiah, H K Veerangowda, H C Dasappa, H. Siddaiah, K. R. Karanth, B. S. Kakkillaya, B. V. Kakkillaya and Anakru were by now prominent in the movement. Anakru in particular, was influential with his writing and oratory.

== Nagpur Conference ==
Due to the efforts of these organisations and leaders, the movement not only gained in momentum but also attained a quasi-political influence. In 1920, Karnataka State Political Conference was held at Dharwad. At this conference, which was presided over by V P Madhav Rao, a unanimous resolution was passed demanding the unification of all Kannada speaking areas. The conference also advised Kannadigas to attend the Nagpur Congress to be held later that year in large numbers. Almost 800 delegates attended the Nagpur conference where the Indian National Congress made the decision to create the Karnataka Pradesh Congress Committee. This aided the movement and leaders of the Congress like S Nijalingappa and Kengal Hanumanthaiah (both of whom went on to become Chief Ministers of Karnataka) and Gudleppa Hallikeri also served as active members of the movement.

== 1924 Belgaum Conference ==
In 1924, the Belgaum (now belagavi) congress was held under the aegis of the newly formed Karnataka Pradesh Congress committee arm of the INC. Mahatma Gandhi presided over this historic conference. This conference was attended by Kannadigas from all parts in large numbers. The first Karnataka Unification Conference was also organised at the same venue. This was presided over by Siddappa Kambli.

These two conferences were attended by a significant number of leaders, writers, poets and intellectuals from Karnataka. It was here that Huilgol Narayana Rao first sang his Udayavagali namma cheluva kannada nadu, which meant Let our charming Kannada land dawn!. The INC lent formal support to the cause; this was the first time the movement had explicit political support. As a result of these conferences, the Karnataka Ekikarana Sabha which was to work in collaboration with the KPCC began with the objective of the unification of Karnataka. The Karnataka Ekikarana Sabha later came to be known as the Karnataka Ekikarana Sangha.

== Nehru committee recommendation ==
In 1928, due to the efforts of Gudleppa Hallikeri, the formation of a single province by uniting all Kannada speaking areas was recommended by the Nehru Committee. It was stated by the committee that there was a "strong prima facie case for unification". It also went on to state that it believed Karnataka could also be a financially strong province. This recommendation aided the movement. There was later support from literary figures like Kuvempu, Bendre, Gokak, S B Joshi, Betgeri Krishna Sharma, M Govinda Pai, Shivarama Karanth and Kayyara Kiyyanna Rai. There was also widespread support growing from the newspapers and media. Several smaller public and college organisations also began, notably in Bengaluru, Shivamogga and Raichur.

== 1937 elections ==
Following the Simon Commission, elections were held in 1937. The Congress said it would favour the formation of the separate Karnataka and Andhra states. This was met with some resistance from the British and also some of the princely states. While the princely states feared that they might stand to lose some territory, the British themselves were unsure of how they would handle the reorganisation.

Siddappa Kambli sensing the reluctance, decided that the movement had to approach the Simon Commission with their case. But the other leaders of the movement like Gangadharrao Deshpande, Rangarao Diwakar, Koujalgi Srinivasarao and Aluru advised him not to do so as they had boycotted the commission. Gudlappa Hallikeri invited the Maharaja of Mysore to tour the Kannada speaking provinces of Bombay and Hyderabad. After the tour and several discussions the movement gained his active support.

== 1946 conference ==
The tenth conference of the Ekikarana movement was held on 10 January 1946 in Mumbai. This conference was inaugurated by Sardar Patel and attended by the likes of B. G. Kher, the then Chief Minister of Bombay presidency. In his speech at the conference, Sardar Patel stated that the interests of all linguistic groups would be high on the list of priorities for the new government of independent India. This served to reduce the apprehensions of the movement leaders and the common people. This was also to have a bearing on the constituent assembly that met in the same year.

In the same year, the All-Karnataka convention, a gathering of Kannadigas was held in Davanagere, in central Karnataka. This was presided over by Mr. M P Patil, the revenue minister of Mumbai. This convention attracted tens of thousands of Kannadigas from Karnataka. Leaders like Gudlappa Hallikeri, Kengal Hanumanthaiah, T Mariyappa, Subramanya, Sowcar Chennaiah, H K Veerangowda, H C Dasappa and H. Siddaiah attended this convention and urged the constituent assembly to create the linguistic states.

== Post Independence ==
Political Divisions of Karnataka post Independence.

India soon gained independence in 1947. The new government soon began delaying concerning the Karnataka Ekikarana movement. Kannada speaking areas were now grouped under five administrative units of the Bombay and Madras provinces, Kodagu, and the princely states of Mysore and Hyderabad. The Akhila Karnataka Ekikarana Parishat met in Kasargod and reiterated the demand for a separate state for Kannadigas.

=== Opposition by Mysore State ===
The state of Mysore and several politicians opposed unification of Karnataka, on the pretext that Mysore state has fertile lands, more developed and present North Karnataka was not developed with large area of dry land.

=== Liberation of Hyderabad-Karnataka ===
While Karnataka became independent with the rest of the country on 15 August 1947, this did not occur in some parts of the state that were under the rule of the Nizam of Hyderabad. Hyderabad consisted of large portions of what were later to be the north eastern districts of Bidar, Kalaburagi and Raichur of Karnataka state. The Lingayat minority in these regions also largely believed that they had been neglected and resented the oppression of the Nizam and the Razakars. The Nizam refused to accede to India until his rule was overthrown by force. Following the 'police action' against the Nizam, Hyderabad province and its citizens became independent on 17 September 1948. This day is celebrated by the Karnataka government as the Hyderabad-Karnataka liberation day.

=== The Dhar and JVP committee ===
In the same year, the government appointed the Dhar commission to look into the demands of the Ekikarana movement as well as those of the other parallel movements in the other states. The Dhar commission in its report, opposed any reorganisation of the states. This was criticised by all quarters including the Jaipur Congress.

The government now formed the 'JVP' committee. This committee had Jawaharlal Nehru, Vallabhbhai Patel and Pattabhi Sitaramayya on the board. This committee examined the demands again and created a report. The JVP report, however, favoured only the creation of the Andhra state while the Karnataka Ekikarana movement was deliberately ignored. The Ekikarana movement saw this as a betrayal of the Congress which had declared the creation of linguistic provinces as one of its goals in its 1951 manifesto.

The movement now formed the Karnataka Ekikarana Paksha to contest the 1951 polls. This was supported by literary figures as well as politicians like Gudlappa Hallikeri, Kengal Hanumantayya, S Nijalingappa and C M Poonacha, the Chief Minister of Kodagu.

=== The Fazal Ali Committee ===
In January 1953, at the Congress session in Hyderabad, a resolution was also passed favouring the creation of Andhra Pradesh but not Karnataka. A. J. Doddameti, a senior Congress leader and the member of the Bombay assembly, immediately resigned from his seat and launched a hunger strike at Jakkali in Dharwad. This was widely supported. In the riots at Hubli that followed, many people were injured and several courted arrest.

In the Hubli-Dharwad by-elections that followed, the Congress were defeated while the Karnataka Ekikarana Paksha's candidate won by a landslide. Under pressure, Prime Minister Nehru constituted the States Reorganisation Commission (SRC), also known as the Fazal Ali commission due to being headed by Justice Fazal Ali. At the same time, the Mysore government appointed a fact-finding committee, headed by M. Sheshadri. The SRC opposed the unification but its findings were ignored due to overwhelming support in favour from Mysoreans such as Mokshagundam Visvesvaraya.

Congress leader Gudlappa Hallikeri furthered the cause of unification within his party by advocating for states based on linguistic demographics. He also represented and urged unification in front of the SRC. The SRC eventually recommended the reorganisation of the states based on linguistic demographics and this was soon ratified in parliament.

== Aftermath ==
The ratification in parliament of the recommendations of the SRC was reacted to positively by Kannadiga people, although there was also disappointment at the non-inclusion of certain parts of Mysore state. Most notable among the excluded areas was Kasargod, which had been one of the centres from which the Ekikarana movement had launched its agitation. This is an issue that continues to affect those who fought for the unification of Karnataka.

On 1 November 1973, under Devaraj Urs as Chief Minister, Mysore state was renamed as Karnataka.

== Ekikarana Awards ==
To mark the celebrations of the 50th year of Karnataka's unification, the state government headed by the then Chief Minister H D Kumarswamy awarded 36 individuals and 4 organisations with the Ekikarana Award for the service they had rendered for uniting Karnataka.

The Karnataka Vidyavardhaka Sangha, Dharwad and the Kannada Sahitya Parishat, Bengaluru (that Aluru once assisted and headed) and Karnataka Samithi (R), Kasaragod were included among the recipients.

== See also ==
- Mysore (disambiguation)
- History of Hyderabad
- Karnataka history timeline
