= Karnataka Vidyavardhaka Sangha =

Cultural organization in Dharwad, India

- ಕರ್ನಾಟಕ ವಿದ್ಯಾವರ್ಧಕ ಸಂಘ
- Formation: 20 July 1890; 136 years ago
- Founder: R H Deshpande
- Headquarters: Dharwad, Karnataka, India

The Karnataka Vidyavardhaka Sangha (ಕರ್ನಾಟಕ ವಿದ್ಯಾವರ್ಧಕ ಸಂಘ) is a cultural and literary organisation established on 20 July 1890 by R H Deshpande in Dharwad, India which was then under the British rule of Bombay Presidency. This institution was established with the sole objective of promoting Kannada culture and language in times when the Kannada speaking regions of present-day Karnataka were split into six different areas, where Kannada was often overshadowed by other languages. Soon the Sangha morphed into a hub for the Karnataka Ekikarana (Unification) movement and played a pivotal role in the eventual unification of Karnataka. It also passed the first formal resolution advocating the political integration of all Kannada-speaking regions in 1917. It inspired the establishment of several institutions and organisations across the state. It served as a model for the later establishment of the Kannada Sahitya Parishat in Bangalore (1915). For its invaluable services and contributions to Kannada and Karnataka, this institution was awarded the Ekikarana Award by the Government of Karnataka on the occasion of the 50th year celebrations of Karnataka state in 2006.

== History ==
After the downfall of the Vijayanagara Empire, through the period of British rule, Karnataka was divided into six parts, namely Bombay Karnataka, Hyderabad Karnataka, Madras Karnataka, Coorg, Mysore and smaller princely states like Mudhol, Jamkhandi, Savanur etc. The result was that the Kannada culture and language in these areas were eclipsed by other cultures. For example, in the four districts of Dharwad, Belgaum, North Kanara and Bijapur districts that comprised Bombay Karnataka, Kannada culture and language had suffered severe setbacks due to prolonged Maratha rule. When the British introduced their system of education in this area, they were under the impression that these districts were part of Maharashtra and started Marathi schools there. Mr. Walter Elliott, Deputy Collector of Dharwad, soon found that the language of the people was Kannada, but Marathi was imposed upon them. Out of sympathy for the Kannada people and his knowledge of Kannada, Elliot started Kannada schools in Dharwad around 1830. Balashastri Jambhekar, an education officer of the Bombay Government, also felt that the since the language of the people was Kannada, there should be Kannada schools in these four districts.

A determined effort to establish Kannada schools was made by Mr. W. A. Russell, who after serving as Professor in the Deccan College at Pune, was appointed as Educational Inspector of the Southern Division of the Bombay Province. To Russell's amazement, he found that there were not a sufficient number of persons who could teach Kannada effectively. He induced officers in other departments of the Bombay Government who were Kannadigas and who knew Kannada sufficiently to join the Education Department. Among them were Deputy Chennabasappa, Gangadhara Madivaleshwara Turumari, Srinivas Rodda, Bhujangarao Huilgol, Venkatarangu Katti and others. When Mr. R. H. Deshpande who was studying in the Deccan college passed his M.A. examination with a gold medal in 1884, Russell persuaded him to join the Education department and assured him that he would, with his stellar academic career, soon replace him as the Inspector of the Southern Division. True to his word, Russell promoted Mr. Deshpande as deputy inspector of Karwar within a few months of his joining Sardar High School in Belgaum. However, Mr. Russell was subsequently shifted from his post and in his place a Marathi officer was posted. For the next 25 years, three Marathi officers ruled over the Bombay Karnataka area and introduced Marathi in the Kannada schools. Mr. Deshpande naturally resented this and decided to revolt against this foisting of Marathi on Kannada children, but as a Government servant, there were restrictions on what he could do. He took shelter under the British policy of encouraging education in the vernacular language and decided to establish a Sangha for the protection of Kannada and the Unification of the Karnataka areas. On 20 July 1890, a public gathering was held in Dharwad where the Karnataka Vidyavardhaka Sangha was formally constituted. Shamrao Vithal Kaikini was elected as its first president, and Deshpande was appointed as its inaugural honorary secretary.

The organisation quickly built a cross-regional network, enrolling members and patrons from across British and princely jurisdictions, including Pune, Bombay, Hyderabad, Mangalore, Karwar, and Mysore. European Indologists and scholars of Kannada, including Ferdinand Kittel, B. L. Rice, and J. F. Fleet, as well as historian R. G. Bhandarkar, became honorary members of the Sangha. The institution also received financial patronage from Chamarajendra Wadiyar X, the Maharaja of Mysore, who contributed towards the construction of its headquarters building in Dharwad, named Chamaraja Mandira.

== Charter of the Sangha ==
The first charter of the new body was to publish books in Kannada. Kannada could live and thrive only through books and journals so the Sangha brought out its first publication two years after it was established and then came the first Kannada literary and cultural journal Vagabhushana. Since Kannada was the mother tongue of the rulers of Mysore, Mr. Deshpande enlisted the support of the Maharaja of Mysore, Shri Chamaraja Wodeyar for the Sangha. The Government of Mysore used to send its scholars to conduct Kannada exams which the Sangha used to hold periodically. It also gave money for the construction of a building for the Sangha which was appropriately named as Chamaraja Mandira.

The Sangha organized the first conference of Kannada writers in Dharwad in 1905. This was the precursor of the present-day Kannada Sahitya Sammelan (annual literary conference). In 1912, when Sir Mokshagundam Vishweshwaraiah became the Diwan of Mysore, Mr. R. H. Deshpande who knew him intimately, wrote him a letter congratulating him on his appointment and further requested him to foster more attention on the development of the Kannada language and culture. As a result, Mysore convened the first conference of Kannada writers from all parts of the country in Bangalore in 1915. The conference decided among other things to establish the Kannada Sahitya Parishat on the lines of the Karnataka Vidyavardhak Sangha. Mr. Deshpande and Justice R.A. Jagirdar (later the first Vice Chancellor of Karnataka University), served on a committee appointed by the conference to draft the constitution of the Kannada Sahitya Parishat. Thus came into being yet another organization working for the welfare of the Kannada country as a whole.

== Role in the Unification Movement ==
The Sangha served as the principal organizational catalyst for the political and sentimental unification of Karnataka. In 1912, following the appointment of M. Visvesvaraya as Dewan of Mysore, the Sangha engaged in dialogue with Mysore officials, culminating in the convening of the 1915 all-Karnataka writers' conference in Bangalore that established the Kannada Sahitya Parishat. On 7 October 1917, the Karnataka Vidyavardhaka Sangha passed a landmark resolution petitioning the British authorities to unify all Kannada-speaking territories into a single administrative province. This demand was reiterated through delegations and memorandums to successive Viceroys in the 1920s and 1930s. The Sangha also led civic campaigns for higher education in northern Karnataka, actively lobbying for the establishment of Karnatak University, which was founded in Dharwad in 1949. It also petitioned for equal representation of Kannada on All India Radio, which opened its Dharwad broadcasting station in 1950. During the Sangha's golden jubilee celebrations in April 1940, scholar B. M. Srikantaiah unveiled the portrait of founder R. H. Deshpande and commended the organisation for popularizing the slogan Sirigannadam Gelge ("May glorious Kannada triumph").

== Modern history and governance ==
In the post-independence era, the Sangha participated in public movements regarding language policy and state borders, notably coordinating regional support during the Gokak agitation of the early 1980s, which demanded first-language status for Kannada in state schools. Veteran journalist and writer Patil Puttappa served as president of the Sangha for over five decades, from 1967 until his death in 2020. During the Sangha's centenary, an auditorium named Dr. Patil Puttappa Sabhabhavana was constructed on its premises in Dharwad. The Sangha is governed by a 15-member council, including six office bearers. In October 2016, the organisation adopted a resolution reserving two seats on its nine-member executive committee—one for women and one for Scheduled Castes or Scheduled Tribes—representing the first statutory reservation in its governing body in its 126-year history.
