= Hiregutti =

- village
- Country: India
- State: Karnataka

Government
  - Type: Panchayat raj
  - Body: Gram panchayat

Languages
  - Official: Kannada
- Time zone: UTC+5:30 (IST)
- Postal code: 581333
- ISO 3166 code: IN-KA
- Vehicle registration: KA
- Website: karnataka.gov.in

Hiregutti is a village in Kumta Taluka.

Hiregutti is a village located 18 km from Kumta, and 15 km from Ankola. It is near the historical site known as Gokarna. Hiregutti is a Grampanchayat and its sub-village names include: Kolimanjaguni, Yennemidi, Nushikote, Morba, Betkuli, and Tagatgeri.

Hiregutti is a historical place and here the temple of Lord Shiva and Brahma Jataka, Ravalnatha, Vishnu Deva, Hire Hosaba, Bommayya Deva and lot of Goad located here. Shiva temple and Brahma Jataka temple complex is more than 1800 years old, it is very close to the national highway and it has been announced as a national monument temple.

== Schools ==
- Secondary high school, Hiregutti.
- MHPS Hiregutti
