= Anantpur =

- Village
- Village location on map Anantpur (Uttar Pradesh) Anantpur (India)
- Coordinates: 25.332263°N 82.890306°E
- Country: India
- State: Uttar Pradesh
- Elevation: 85 m (279 ft)

Population (2011)
  - Total: 1,140

Languages
  - Official: Hindi
- Time zone: UTC+5:30 (IST)
- PIN: 221107
- STD: 0542
- Vehicle registration: UP65 XXXX
- Village code: 209469
- Website: up.gov.in

Anantpur (Anantpur) is a village in Varanasi district in the Indian state of Uttar Pradesh. It is about 267 kilometers from the state capital Lucknow.

== Demography ==
Anantpur has a total population of 1,140 people amongst 191 families. Sex ratio of Anantpur is 894 and child sex ratio is 1,165. Uttar Pradesh state average for both ratios is 912 and 902 respectively.

Details	Male	Female	Total	Comments
Number of houses	-	-	191	(census 2011)
Adult	505	425	930	(census 2011)
Children (0–6 years)	97	113	210	(census 2011)
Total population	620	538	1,140	(census 2011)
Literacy	76.44%	59.76%	68.82%	(census 2011)
