= Kibbanahalli =

- Village
- Location within Karnataka Location within India
- Coordinates: 13.308°N 76.648°E
- Country: India
- State: Karnataka
- District: Tumkur district

Languages
  - Official: Kannada
- Time zone: UTC+5:30 (IST)
- PIN: 572114

Kibbanahalli is a village in the Tiptur taluk of Tumkur district in Karnataka state, India. Kibbanahalli is a pre-historic site. Archaeologists believe that this site along with Biligere belong to the Early Stone Age. Hand-axe, guillotine chisels and many other Palaeolithic specimens found in the region are kept in the museum of the Geology Department of the Central College, Bangalore.

== Transport ==
Kibbanahalli is well connected by road and railway networks. It is 20 km from Taluk Headquarters Tiptur and the nearest major rail head is in District Headquarters Tumkur.

== See also ==
- Hagalavadi
- Tumkur
- Mysore
