= Aluru Venkata Rao =

Indian historian

- Born: 12 July 1880; Bijapur, Bombay Presidency, British India
- Died: 25 February 1964 (aged 83) (in-present Dharwad, Karnataka, India)
- Education: B.A L.L.B
- Alma mater: Fergusson College
- Occupations: Writer; historian; journalist
- Known for: Unification of Karnataka

Aluru Venkata Rao (also sometimes referred as Aluru Venkata Raya) (12 July 1880 – 25 February 1964) was an Indian historian, writer and journalist. He is revered as Karnataka Kulapurohita (High priest of the Kannada family) in the Karnataka region for his contribution towards the cause of a separate Karnataka state. He became famous for undertaking a Karnataka Ekikarana movement in support of the formation of a state for the Kannada-speaking population of Mysore, Bombay Presidency and the Nizam's Hyderabad.

Rao started a newspaper, Jaya Karnataka, and stated that the sole aim of the newspaper was to strive for Karnataka’s statehood.

== Early life ==
Venkata Rao was born on 12 July 1880 to Bhima Rao, a sheristadar in the revenue department. The family lived in Bijapur, Karnataka. He studied for a B.A and L.L.B at Fergusson College, where he came in contact with Vinayak Damodar Savarkar, Senapati Bapat and Bal Gangadhar Tilak. Rao was a close friend of Tilak and translated his Gita Rahasya into Kannada.

== Works ==
Rao began by contributing articles to newspapers such as Chandrodhaya, Karnataka Patra, and Rajahamsa, Karnataka Vritta In 1906 he began to work as an editor for a monthly magazine, Vagbhushana. In November 1922, he started Jaya Karnataka, a monthly magazine that published articles on a variety of topics. About 27 books written by Rao have been published, the first of which was Vidyaranya Charitre in 1907. His other works include Karnataka Gatha Vaibhava, Karnataka Veeraratnagalu, Karnatakathva Sutragalu and Karnatakathva Vikasa. In 1907 he organised a conference of Kannada writers and the next year started the Karnataka Grantha Prasarada Mandali. In 1930 he presided over the Kannada Sahitya Sammelana held at Mysore. In accordance with the wishes of Tilak, he translated the former's work Gita Rahasya from Marathi to Kannada. He independently interpreted Bhagavad Gita and authored the books Gita Prakasha, Gita Parimala, Gita Sandesha, Gita Kusuma Manjari in Kannada.

== Karnatakada Kulapurohita ==
Rao was overjoyed when Karnataka was unified on 1 November 1956. He went to Hampi and performed pooja to the goddess Bhuvaneshwari in the Virupaksha Temple and gained the name Karnatakada Kulapurohita. He was sad that the name of Karnataka did not find a place in the list of states mentioned in the national anthem and wrote about its inclusion to the Prime Minister and President of India. He was honoured in the capital of Bangalore on the eighth anniversary of the state's formation in 1963.

Rao died on 25 February 1964 at his residence in Dharwad, and was survived by four sons and a daughter.

== Bibliography ==
Rao wrote many books, including:

- Vidyaranya Charitre (1907)
- Kannadigara Bhramanirasana (1915)
- Karnataka Gatha Vaibhava (1917)
- Karnatakatwada Sutragulu (Aphorisms of Karnatakawada) (1950)
- Karnatakatwada Vikasa (Evolution of Karnatakatwa) (1957)
- Gita Rahasya, a translation of Tilak's Marathi work into Kannada (1918)
- Nanna Jeevana Smritigalu, his autobiography (1941)
- He wrote six books on Madhwa philosophy

== Death ==
Aluru Venkata Rao died on 25 February 1964 at the age of 83 at his residence in Dharwad.

== Legacy ==
- As a tribute to Rao, the Government of Karnataka changed the name of Albert Victor Road (A V Road) to Alur Venkatarao Road (A V Road) in Bangalore.
- A CD on his life and works, produced in Kannada and English, was released on his 49th death anniversary by Central Institute of Indian Languages.
