= Aladageri =

- Village
- Location in Karnataka, India Aladageri (India)
- Coordinates: 14.5443500°N 75.4867400°E
- Country: India
- State: Karnataka
- District: Haveri
- Talukas: Hirekerur

Government
  - Body: Village Panchayat

Area
  - Total: 7.9414 km^{2} (3.0662 sq mi)

Population (2001)
  - Total: 2,611
  - Density: 328.8/km^{2} (851.5/sq mi)

Languages
  - Official: Kannada
- Time zone: UTC+5:30 (IST)
- Postal code: 581109
- Nearest city: Hirekerur
- Civic agency: Village Panchayat

Aladageri is a village in the southern state of Karnataka, India. It is located in the Hirekerur taluk of Haveri district in Karnataka.

== See also ==
- Haveri
- Districts of Karnataka
