= Mohan Shantanagoudar =

Indian judge (1958–2021)

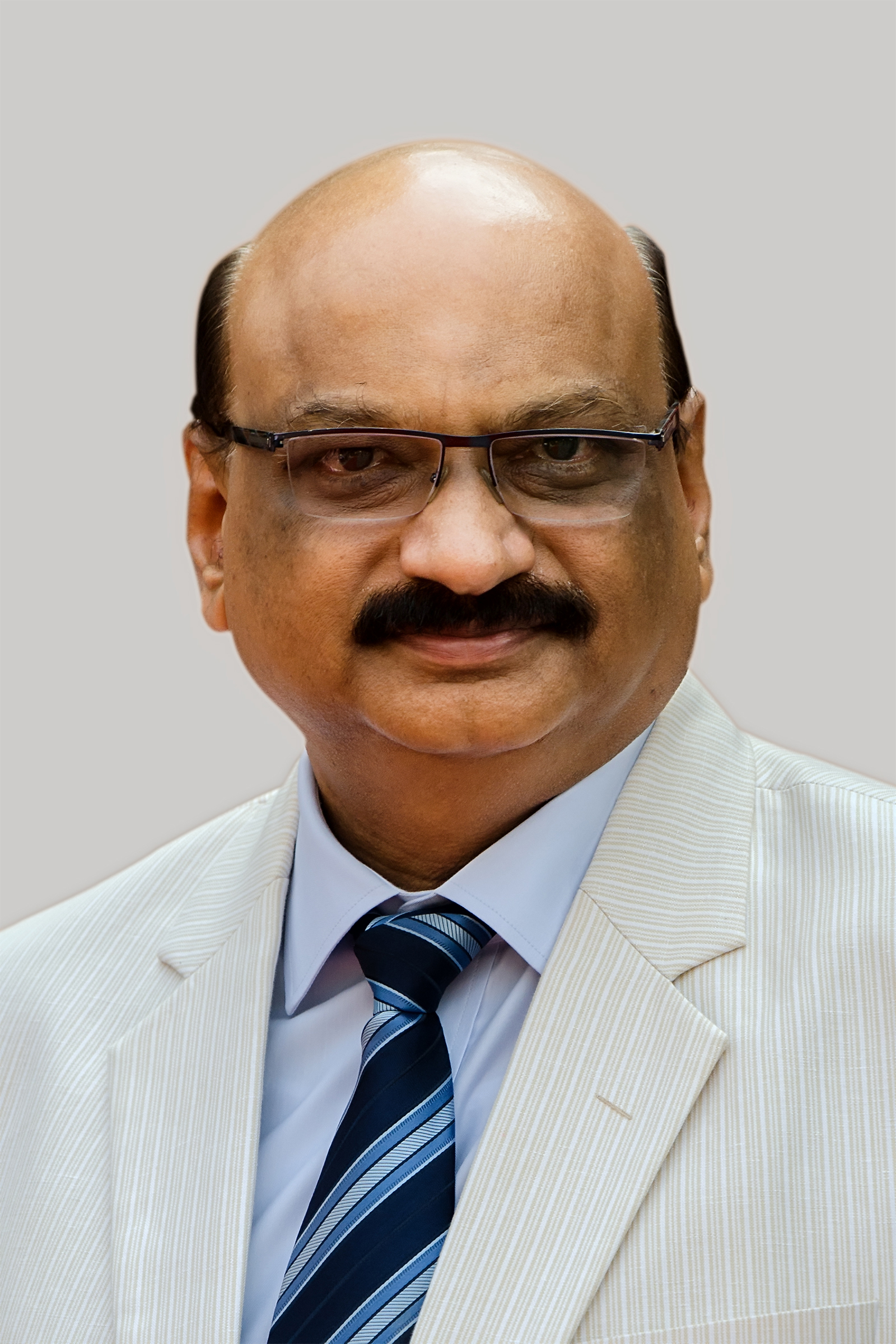

Judge of the Supreme Court of India
- In office 17 February 2017 – 25 April 2021
- Nominated by: Jagdish Singh Khehar
- Appointed by: Pranab Mukherjee

Chief Justice of the Kerala High Court
- In office 22 September 2016 – 17 February 2017
- Nominated by: T. S. Thakur
- Appointed by: Pranab Mukherjee

Acting Chief Justice of the Kerala High Court
- In office 1 August 2016 – 21 September 2016
- Appointed by: Pranab Mukherjee

Judge of the Karnataka High Court
- In office 24 September 2004 – 31 July 2016
- Nominated by: Ramesh Chandra Lahoti
- Appointed by: A. P. J. Abdul Kalam

Personal details
- Born: 5 May 1958 Chikkerur, Hirekerur Taluk, Haveri District, Karnataka
- Died: 25 April 2021 (aged 62) Medanta Hospital, Gurgaon
- Education: Karnatak University

Mohan Mallikarjunagouda Shantanagoudar (5 May 1958 – 25 April 2021) was an Indian jurist and former judge of the Supreme Court of India.

He served as chief justice of the Kerala High Court.

== Biography ==
Shantanagoudar initially practiced at the Karnataka High Court as an advocate. He was appointed an additional judge in 2003, and confirmed as a permanent judge of the Karnataka High Court on 29 September 2004. He was appointed the acting chief justice of the Kerala High Court on 1 August 2016 and chief justice of that High Court on 22 September 2016. In February 2017, Shantanagoudar was appointed a judge of the Supreme Court of India by President Pranab Mukherjee.

He died during service on 24 April 2021 at Medanta Hospital in Gurgaon due to pneumonia and post-COVID-19 complications.
