= Karjagi =

Coordinates: 14°28′N 74°49′E

- village
- Interactive map of Karjagi
- Country: India
- State: Karnataka
- District: Haveri
- Talukas: Haveri

Government
  - Body: Gram panchayat

Population (2001)
  - Total: 7,508

Languages
  - Official: Kannada
- Time zone: UTC+5:30 (IST)

Karjagi is a village in the southern state of Karnataka, India. It is located in the Haveri taluk of Haveri district in Karnataka.

== Demographics ==
As of 2001 India census, Karjagi had a population of 7508 with 3844 males and 3664 females. Karjagi is a village located in Haveri Taluk of Haveri district in Karnataka. Around 2,048 families reside in Karjagi village. Karjagi village is administered by Sarpanch(Head of village) who is elected every five years.

As per the Census India 2011, Karjagi has population of 9,610 with 5,000 males and 4,610 females. The sex-ratio of Karjagi village is around 922 compared to 973 which is average of Karnataka state.

The literacy rate of Karjagi village is 66.88% out of which 72.74% males are literate and 60.52% females are literate. There are 3.69% Scheduled Caste and 13.45% Scheduled Tribe of total population in Karjagi villages.

== See also ==
- Haveri
- Districts of Karnataka
