= Chikkerur =

- village
- Location in Karnataka, India Chikkerur (India)
- Coordinates: 14.532610°N 75.3083900°E
- Country: India
- State: Karnataka
- District: Haveri
- Talukas: Hirekerur

Population (2001)
  - Total: 6,820

Languages
  - Official: Kannada
- Time zone: UTC+5:30 (IST)

Chikkerur is a village in the southern state of Karnataka, India. It is located in the Hirekerur taluk of Haveri district in Karnataka.

== Demographics ==
As of 2001 India census, Chikkerur had a population of 6820 with 3515 males and 3305 females. Village having many archeological evidences of Sanskrit Pandits and ancient Sanskrit school to train up pupils from Mysuru palace A renowned Veterinary Scientist Dr.Mohankumar Shettar born in this village.

== See also ==
- Haveri
- Districts of Karnataka
