= Ballary M. Raghavendra =

Ballary M Raghavendra
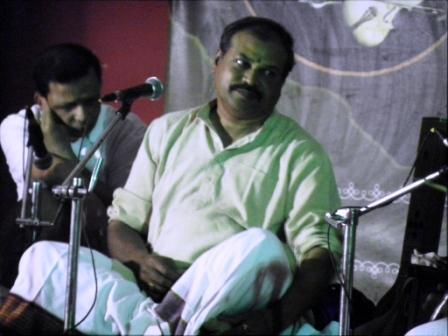
- Ballary M Raghavendra

Background information
- Born: 23 April 1958 (age 68); Hospet, Ballary, Karnataka, India
- Genre: Carnatic music
- Occupations: Assistant Station Director AIR (Retd.)

Vidwan Ballary M Raghavendra (Kannada: ಬಳ್ಳಾರಿ ಎಂ ರಾಘವೇಂದ್ರ) is a prominent Carnatic vocalist from Karnataka. He has a master's degree in music from Bangalore University. He has served in various capacities across multiple All India Radio stations in Karnataka. Initially joining as a program executive, he later went on to become the Assistant Station Director in AIR. He is a Top grade artist of All India Radio in Carnatic classical music. He has the rare privilege of being an A grade artist also in devotional and light classical forms of music. He is popularly known for delivering music compositions with lyrical clarity, emotion and good use of rhythmic patterns After his retirement from All India Radio, he is currently serving as a guest faculty at Dr. Gangubai Hangal Music and Performing arts university in Mysore.

== Lineage ==
Vidwan Ballary M Raghavendra was born in Hospet, Ballary, Karnataka on 23 April 1958. He hails from a family of Carnatic musicians going back many generations.

=== Haridasa Tradition ===
His grandfather Ballary Mundrigi Raghavendrachar belonged to Haridasa tradition of Vijaya Dasa, a prominent Haridasa of Karnataka. The father of Raghavendrachar was Narasimhachar, grand father was Venkannachar. They were basically from the Mundragi village of Gadag district. Later Raghavendrachar left Mundragi village and settled in Ballary. Raghavendrachar was a musician well versed in many disciplines of music and was a professor of music at Queen Mary college in Chennai (contemporary of Prof P. Sambamurthy). He is supposed to have given vocal lessons to Puttaraj Gawai

=== Ballary Brothers: Popularising Carnatic Music in early 50's & 60's ===
Raghavendra's father, Vidwan Ballary. M. Venkatesh Achar was a carnatic classical vocalist and his uncle Ballary M Sheshagiri Achar was a Vaggeyakara (composer of lyrics and music). His uncle and father were known as 'Ballary Brothers' and performed in most parts of India during the 1950s and 1960s. Ballary Brothers were accompanied in numerous concerts by stalwarts such as Palghat Mani Iyer, Lalgudi Jayaraman, Palghat R. Raghu, T. K. Murthy, M. S. Gopalakrishnan, Umayalpuram K. Sivaraman, T. N. Krishnan, Karaikudi Mani etc.

His father Sri Ballary M Venkateshachar has been conferred with 'Sangeeta Vidyanidhi' award from Mysore JSS Sangeeta Sabha, 'Ashthana Vidwan' award from Shri Ganapathi Sacchidananda Ashrama's avadhoota datta peetha, 'Karnataka Kalashri' award from Karnataka state sangeeta nritya academy.

=== Continuing the tradition ===
Raghavendra's family members have continued the tradition of promoting Carnatic classical music. His sister Shrimati Vani Sateesh is a prominent Carnatic vocalist, who had given her first concert at the age of 10. She is "A" grade artist of All India Radio in Carnatic Classical Vocal. Vani's core strength and love has always been bhakti and singing compositions filled with bhakti rasa.

== Musical training ==
Raghavendra's initial training was under the tutelage of his uncle Ballary M. Sheshagiri Achar who went on to create 400 kritis. He was also greatly influenced by his father Ballary M. Venkatesh Achar. Raghavendra considers himself lucky that he had two gurus who constantly took him on the right path. In contrast, the opportunities for Ballary Brothers were limited when they were trying to establish themselves.

My gurus would run to a hotel everyday to listen to the radio airing classical music. It mirrors their extraordinary focus and commitment. Today we have everything so easy, but still we pale in front of these doyens!

— Ballary M Raghavendra

He was also mentored by Stalwarts such as P. S. Narayanaswamy, and Lalgudi Jayaraman for certain period.

When Raghavendra moved from Mysore to Dharwad he also learnt Hindustani vocal music from Pandit Chandrashekar Puranik mutt a renowned Hindustani musician from Gwalior Gharana. Raghavendra got greatly influenced by popular artist M Prabhakar in the genre of light music and performed together with him in many musical programmes.

== Musical performance ==
Raghavendra started giving stage performances at a very young age. He gave his first stage performance at the age of 9 years. Raghavendra has produced many music-based programmes such as Aaswaada (on music appreciation), Swarasangama (on teaching music) and many other musical features, which are highly popular among the music-lovers and general public.

A villager used to go atop a mountain in Challakere in order to catch the radio signals and record the episodes of Swarasangama. He then used to make his fellow villagers listen to the music lessons regularly. 35 such villagers in Challakere and Arsikere, were not just able to listen to Carnatic music but they were even able to pass the Junior music exams with high distinction through this programme. This incidence was really a satisfying moment in my career in AIR!

— Ballary M Raghavendra

Raghavendra is a dedicated music teacher who has a rare ability to identify and groom music students based on their individual strengths. Popular singer Vijay Prakash of "Jai Ho" (song) fame is known to have learnt Carnatic music under Raghavendra while he was in Mysore.

In addition to being a vocalist, he is well versed in Konnakol and Morsing. Raghavendra often uses expressions of Hindustani music in his concerts especially while delivering devotional compositions of Haridasas. He also has performed jugalbandis with eminent Hindustani vocalists in musical concerts. Raghavendra has presented numerous illustrative talks and demonstrations on music. He has toured Europe and Canada along with TAS R Mani Ensemble. He has been very successful in establishing and promoting classical music in remote areas of Karnataka where the classical form of music was non-existent.

Vishesha Fine Arts a not-for-profit charitable trust is run under the guidance of Artists like Vani Sateesh, Mysore M. Nagaraj, Mysore M. Manjunath, painters B.K.S. Varma, G.N. Seetharamiah and Sri Ballary M Raghavendra. It is started with an intention to provide Fine arts education in schools; bringing rare concerts to the public; and recognizing the efforts of individuals striving to propagate music in society. An annual event called Vishesha Utsava is also conducted under the banner of Vishesha Fine Arts where various artists render their performance. The organization was inaugurated on 29 January 2011 and Sri Mysore Sateesh is the trustee of this organization.

== Music style ==
Traditions in rendering and concert packaging were passed on quite well to Raghavendra. Ballary school of Music has the rare distinction of nurturing pathantara of time-honoured clarity, a technique that gathered fine distinctions and gradations with the influence of approaches from the Karnataka, Tamil Nadu and interior Andhra music schools. Another style of the Ballary school of Music is, the raga taken up for the warm-up varna would be there for raga tana pallavi. Taking off a piece from anupallavi is yet another style of the Ballary school of Music.

== Albums ==
List of musical album and movie.

Album/Movie	Year of release	Song
Sri Jagannatha Dasaru - Kannada Movie	2021	'Yenna Binnapa Kelu'
