= Agasanamatti =

- village
- Interactive map of Agasanamatti
- Coordinates: 14.8716°N 75.4884°E
- Country: India
- State: Karnataka
- District: Haveri
- Talukas: Haveri

Government
  - Body: Village Panchayat

Languages
  - Official: Kannada
- Time zone: UTC+5:30 (IST)
- Nearest city: Haveri
- Civic agency: Village Panchayat

Agasanamatti is a village in the southern state of Karnataka, India. It is located in the Haveri taluk of Haveri district in Karnataka.

== See also ==
- Haveri
- Districts of Karnataka
