= Sateesh =

Sateesh may refer to:

- Resmi Sateesh Indian playback singer and actor
- Vani Sateesh Carnatic vocalist
