= Neglur =

Negalur malagannanavar
- village
- Location in Karnataka, India Negalur (India)
- Coordinates: 14°53′44″N 75°36′28″E
- Country: India
- State: Karnataka
- District: Haveri
- Talukas: Haveri

Population (2025)
  - Total: 12,000

Languages
  - Official: Kannada
- Time zone: UTC+5:30 (IST)
- very good village

Negalur is a village in the southern state of Karnataka, India. It is located in the Haveri taluk of Haveri district in Karnataka.

== Demographics ==
As of 2001 India census, Neglur had a population of 7329 with 3757 males and 3572 females.

== See also ==
- Haveri
- Districts of Karnataka
- Malagannanavar
