= Puttaraj Gawai =

Indian musician (1914–2010)

Pandit Puttaraj Gawayigalu
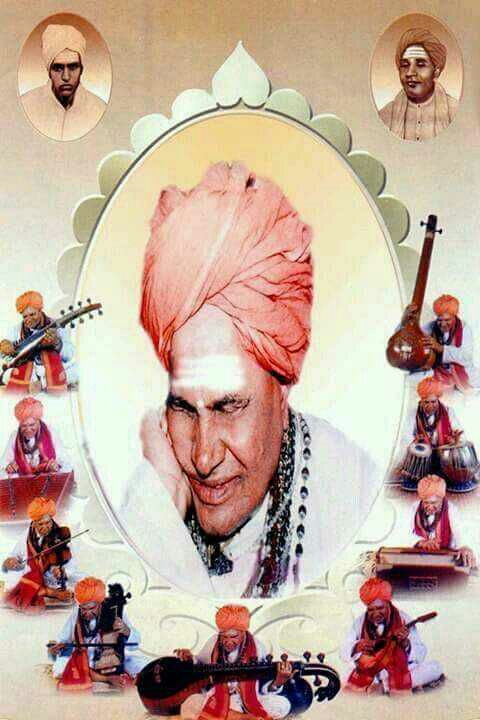

Background information
- Also known as: Ubhaya Gayana Visharada, Ganayogi, Shivayogi, Kavishiromani, and Thribhasha KaviRathna
- Born: Puttayya; 3 March 1914; Devagiri, Karnataka
- Origin: Devagiri, Hanagal, Karnataka
- Died: 17 September 2010 (aged 96) Gadag, Karnataka,
- Genres: Hindustani classical music, Carnatic music etc.
- Occupations: singer, instrumentalist
- Years active: 1933–2010
- Website: PuttarajGavaiji.com

Pandit Puttaraj Gawayigalu (3 March 1914 – 17 September 2010) was an Indian musician in the Hindustani classical tradition, a scholar who authored more than 80 books in Kannada, Sanskrit and Hindi, a music teacher and a social servant. A member of the Gwalior Gharana (school), he is renowned for his ability to play many instruments such as the veena, the tabla, mridangam, violin etc., as well as for his popular renditions of devotional music (bhajans) vachanas. A vocalist both in Hindustani and Carnatic Music, he was awarded the Padma Bhushan, India's third highest civilian honour, in 2010.

== Early life ==
He was born into a poor Kannada Veerashaiva Jangam family in Devagiri in Haveri taluk of Dharwad district (now in Haveri district) of Karnataka. His parents were Revaiah Venkatapurmath and Siddamma. He lost his eyesight at the age of 6 months. His father died when he was 10 months old. His maternal uncle Chandrashekharaiah raised him.

== Musical training ==
Seeing Gawai's interest in music, when he was playing a harmonium of his uncle his uncle took him to Veereshwara Punyashrama, run by Ganayogi Panchakshara Gawai. Under the guidance of Panchakshara Gawai, he mastered Hindustani music. He mastered Carnatic music under the guidance of Mundarigi Raghavendrachar (belonging to Vishesha Parampara). He had mastered around a dozen musical instruments, including harmonium, tabla, and violin.

== Theatre ==
Puttaraj Gawai set up a theater company which would not only to help in raising funds to provide free food, shelter, education to disabled orphans but also to contribute to the theater culture. Thus,"SriGuru Kumareshwara Krupa Poshita Natya Company "was established. His first play 'Sri Sivayogi Sidharama' written and directed by him brought in profit and was applauded. This was followed by many other successful productions.

== Literature ==
Puttaraj Gawai has authored over 80 books on spirituality, religion, history as well as biographies of many 'sharanas' of the Bhakti movement of the 12th century. He has authored books in Kannada, Hindi and Sanskrit. He re-wrote the Bhagavad Gita in Braille script.

== Panchakshara gharana ==
The Panchakshara Gharana is a Hindustani classical music tradition founded by the blind saint-musician Ganayogi Pandit Puttaraja Gawai, blending classical training with devotional folk elements, centered around his Veereshwara Punyashrama school, focused on spiritual music for all, and carried forward by disciples who preserve his style.

Key features :

Founder: Ganayogi Puttaraja Gawai, a visionary who mastered Carnatic and Hindustani music, incorporating various styles.

Musical Style: A rich fusion of Khyal, Thumri, Ghazal, Dhrupad, Tappa, devotional music, and folk forms,

Devotional & Spiritual Focus: A special highlight of the tradition is that the music, compositions (bandishes), and poetry are dedicated strictly to spirituality, avoiding erotic poetry. Uttaradi (Hindustani) and Dakshinadi (Carnatic) music are elevated to divinity within the realm of this gharana.

Legacy: The Veereshwara Punyashrama in Gadag continues to be a major center for classical music education, preserving the Guru-Shishya Parampara (teacher-disciple tradition) and the unique style of the gharana.

The gharana with the largest lineage of disciples is the Panchakshara Gharana.

== Social service ==
Puttaraja Gawai is one of the pioneers of Veereshwara Punyashrama, a music school dedicated to imparting musical knowledge to people who are differentially able-d. Disabled people, especially blind from all castes, religions and sections of the society are taught music in the ashram. Pt. Dr. Puttaraj Kavi Gavai has been the pontiff of Shree Veereshwara Punyashrama Since 1944, after the demise of Pt. Panchakshara Gavai who founded this Ashrama for the upliftment of the born-blind children and orphans. Since its inception in 1942, Shree Veereshwar Punyashrama has been feeding and educating the born-blind and the orphans and the poor children free of cost, without discrimination on the basis of caste and creed. The Ashrama is solely run on the strength of voluntary donations by its devotees. The mission of the Ashrama is selfless service to the community, especially and poorest and the blind. The disciples trained and educated in Music. and Fine Arts have become music teachers, stage-artists, radio-artists, musicians and professionals in the field of arts in thousands. "Pt. Panchakshari Gavai Drama Theatre" organized and founded by Pt. Puttaraj Gavai has given innumerable performances and has been considered one of the pioneering feats of Theatre Movement in the North Karnataka.

This ashram's affiliated theater company, the Krupaposhita Pandit Panchakshara Gavai Natya Sangha, has trained numerous stage artists who achieved widespread recognition. The ashram has trained many Kirtankars (devotional narrators) who present religious speeches across Karnataka in forms such as Puranas, Pravachanas, and Kirtanas. Shree Veereshwara Punyashrama works in areas such as literature, music, religion, education and philanthropy. For over seventy years, the institution has provided welfare programs for visually impaired and underprivileged individuals. Its late pontiff, Pandit Puttaraj Gawai, was widely revered by his followers. He was often referred to as 'walking god' (nadedaduva devaru). Shree Veereshwara Punyashrama of Gadag is a charitable institution that provides free boarding, lodging, and education to more than 1,000 blind, orphaned, and underprivileged children. It manages thirteen educational divisions, offering both general curriculum and specialized musical training.

Shree Veereshwara Punyashrama operates independently of governmental funding or assistance. The institution maintains a secular character and accepts students from all sections of society, irrespective of caste or religious affiliation.

The pontiff, Pt. Puttaraj Kavi Gavai was awarded the "Padma Vibhushan Award".

== Students ==
Gawai has taught many students which presently runs to a count of more than 1000 visually impaired. he was a great singer Some of his well-known students are:

1. Chandrashekhar Puranikmath.
2. S. Ballesh
3. Veerashwar Madri
4. Rajguru Guruswami Kalikeri,
5. Venkatesh Kumar

== Death ==
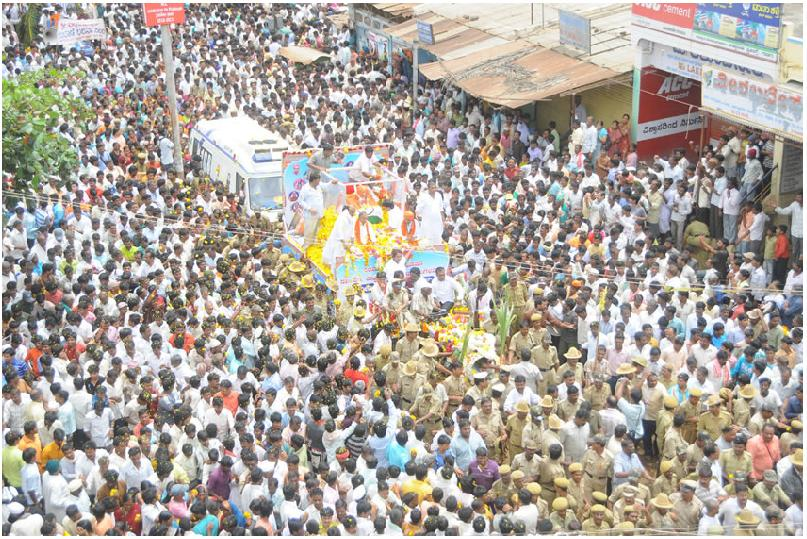
Antima Yatre of Puttaraj Gawai in Gadag, c. 18 September 2010

He died 17 September 2010, at Veereshwara Punyashrama, Gadag, Karnataka. He was buried at the ashram as per the veerashaiva traditions with respectful government honours. More than 1 million devotees attended his funeral ceremony in Gadag on 18 September 2010. The Karnataka state government declared state mourning on Saturday and holiday for government offices as a mark of respect to the multi-faceted personality.

== Literary works ==
Some of his important works are listed below.

=== Books on music ===
- Sangeet Shastra Jnana
- Tabla Shikshaka
- GuruSudha Part 1 & 2
- Taala Panchakshara

=== Books in Kannada ===
- Akkamahadevi Purana
- Haveri Shivabasava Purana
- Ankalagi Adavi Siddeswara Purana
- Huchala Guru Siddeshwara Purana
- Purathanara Purana
- Veerabhadreshwara Purana
- Kalikeri Guru Mahima Purana
- Sharana Basaveshwara Purana
- Sri Ankalagi Adiveshwara Puraana
- Sri Haveri Shivabasava Swami Puraana
- Guleda Gadilingeshwara Puraana
- Sri Veerabhadreshwara Puraana
- Shivasharane Hemareddi Mallamma Puraana
- Chikkenakoppada Sri Channaveera Sharanara Puraana
- Sri Naalatwaada Veereshwara Puraana
- Sri Annadaaneshwara Puraana
- Guddaapura Daanamma Devi Puraana
- Sri Chikkeshwara Puraana
- Sri Kalakeri Gurumahimaa Puraana

=== Books in Sanskrit ===
- Shrimat Kumara Geetha
- Kumareshwara Kavya
- Shri Linga Sooktha
- Tatparya Sahit Sri Rudra
- Panchakshara Suprabhata

=== Books in Hindi ===
- Basava Purana (President Award winner)
- Siddha Linga Vijaya
- Sidhantha Shikamani etc.

=== Theatre and drama in Kannada ===
- Sri Kotturu Basaveshwara
- Nelloora Numbiyaaka
- Shivasharana Chennayya
- Bhagavaan Basaveshwara
- Sri Gurudarhsana
- Hanagalla Kumareshwara Mahatme
- Sri Shivayogi Siddharaameshwara
- Shivayogi Moligi Maarayya
- Shirahatti Sri Phakeereshwara Mahatme
- Shivasharane Uditadi Akkamahadevi
- Sati Sukanya
- Daanaveera Shirasangi Lingarajaru
- Maharati Bheeshma
- Magana Prema
- Devara Duddu

=== Books in Braille ===
- Bhagavad Geeta
- Upanishad
- Sri Rudra and Music

== Awards and recognitions ==
Pt Gawai has been bestowed with many awards for his contributions to music, literature and social service. Some important awards are listed below.

- 1961 - President award for "Basava Purana" in Hindi
- 1962 - Kannada Kavi Kulottama by Kannada Sahitya Parishat, Bangalore
- 1970 - Karnataka Rajyotsava Prashasti
- 1975 - Honorary doctorate by Karnatak University
- 1998 - Nadoja Prashasti
- 1998 - Kanaka Purandara Prashasti
- 1998 - Jnaanayogi by Kannada Sahitya Parishat, Gadag.
- 1998 - Kendra Sangeet Natak Akademi Award
- 1999 - Rajya Sangeeta Vidwan by Government of Karnataka
- 2000 - National Award (for the betterment of disabilities) by Govt of India
- 2001 - "Nadoja Award" from Kannada University
- 2002 - Basavashree award
- 2007 - Kalidas Samman by Government of Madhya Pradesh
- 2007 - "Siddhashri Award" by Mugalkhod Jidaga Math (Add Arun S. Mathapati)
- 2009 - N Vajrakumar Abhinandana Puraskar Samiti Award
- 2009 - Tirumakudalu Chowdiah award by Government of Karnataka
- 2010 - Padma Bhushan
