= Kanavalli =

- village
- Country: India
- State: Karnataka
- District: Haveri
- Talukas: Haveri

Population (2001)
  - Total: 6,262

Languages
  - Official: Kannada
- Time zone: UTC+5:30 (IST)
- Telephone code: )08375
- Nearest city: Haveri

Kanavalli is a village in the southern state of Karnataka, India. It is located in the Haveri taluk of Haveri district in Karnataka. It is 17 kilometers from Haveri city

== Demographics ==
As of 2001 India census, Kanavalli had a population of 6262 with 3284 males and 2978 females.

== Transport ==
Buses are available from Haveri. There are 2 ways to reach kanavalli 1. Via Yattinhalli, Agadi, Shibar 2. Via Kallihal, Katenhalli, Hanumanahalli

Kanavalli is known for Parameshwara temple yearly jathra celebration and Dyamavva Temple Devti celebrated 3 yearly. Next Devti celebration is in 2013.

== See also ==
- Haveri
- Districts of Karnataka
