= Abalur =

Abalur, Abalooru Abaluru
- village
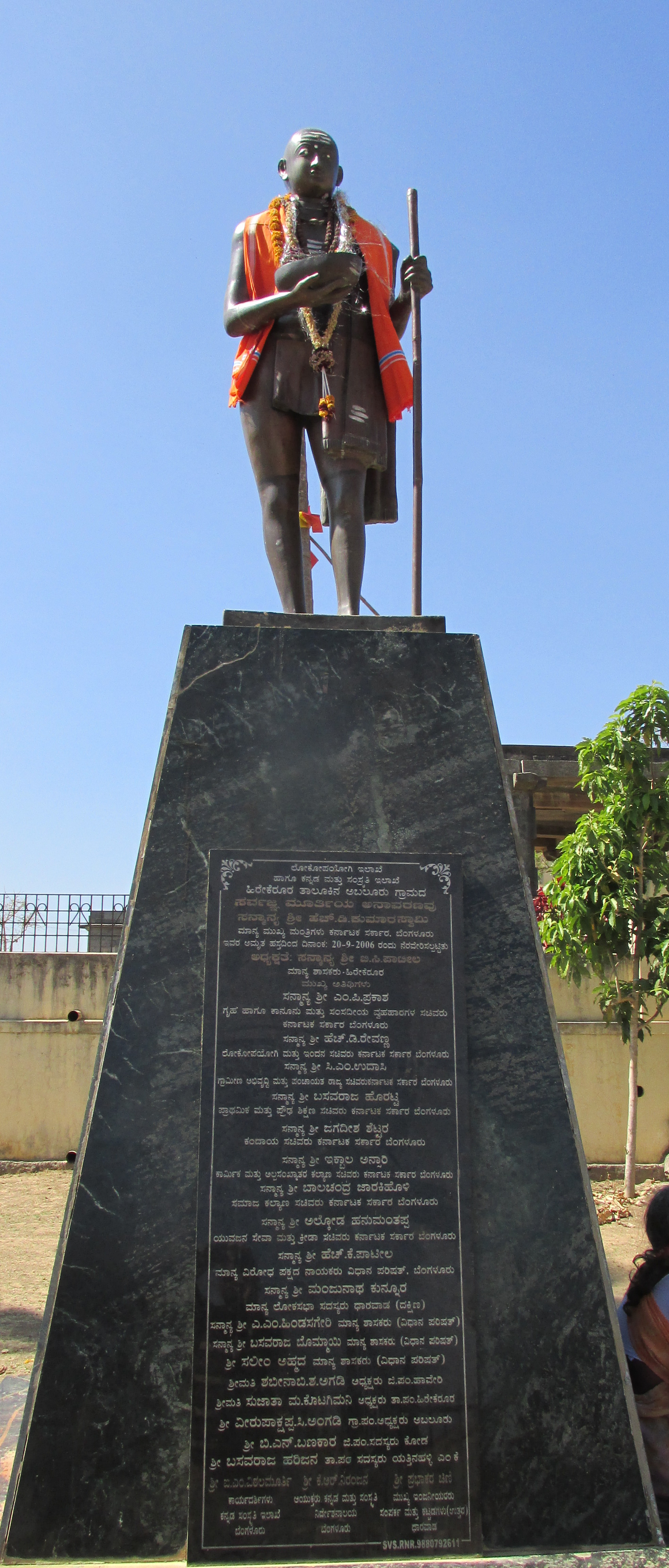
- Statue of Sarvajna

- Location in Karnataka, India Abalur, Abalooru (India)
- Coordinates: 14.518°N 75.40608°E
- Country: India
- State: Karnataka
- District: Haveri
- Talukas: Hirekerur

Government
  - Body: Village Panchayat

Languages
  - Official: Kannada
- Time zone: UTC+5:30 (IST)
- Nearest city: Hirekerur
- Lok Sabha constituency: Haveri
- Vidhan Sabha constituency: Hirekerur
- Civic agency: Village Panchayat

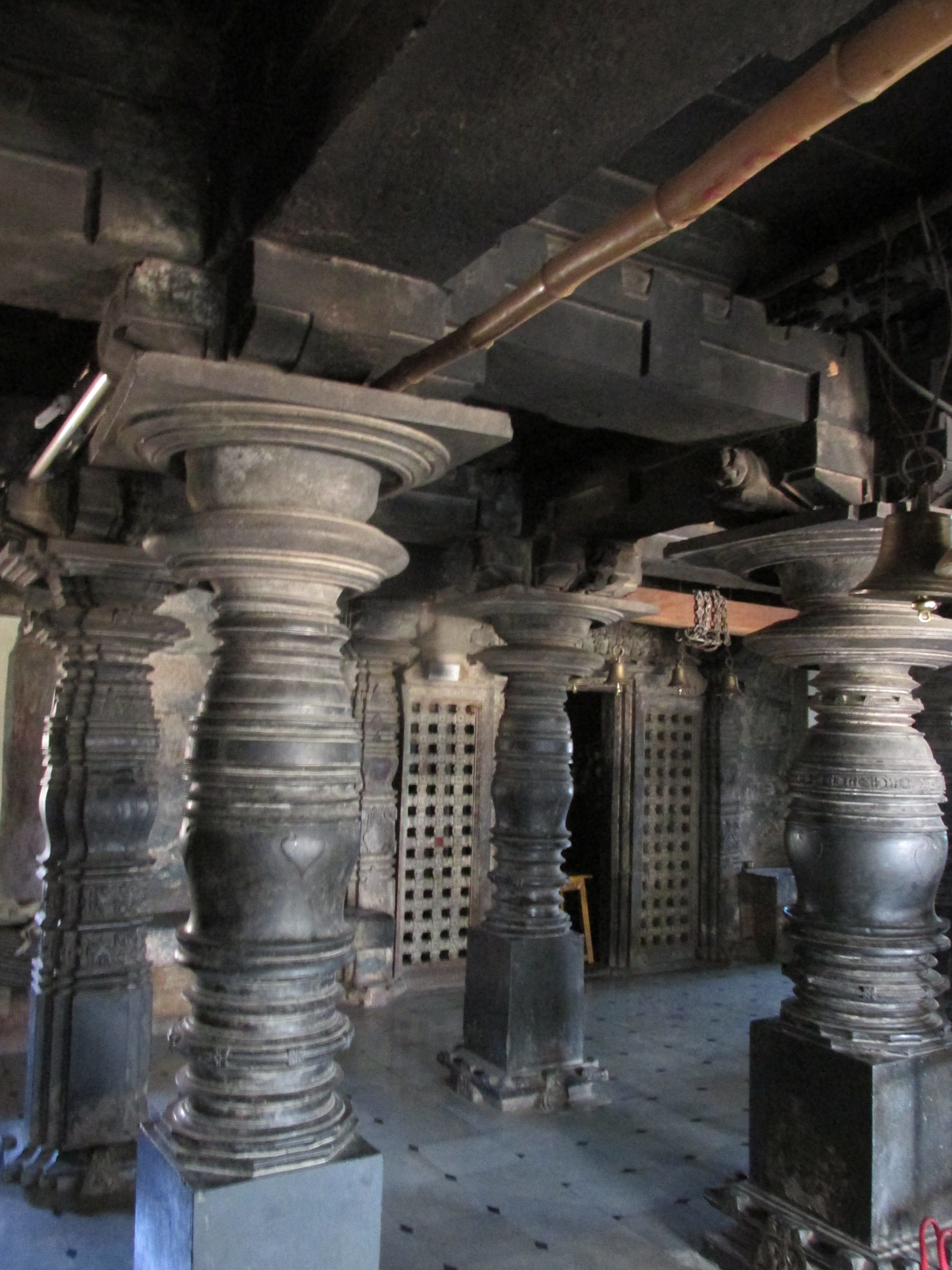
Inside of Lord Basaveshwara(Nandi) Temple

Abalur is a village in the southern state of Karnataka, India. It is located in the Hirekerur taluk of Haveri district in Karnataka. Abalur is the birthplace of Sarvajña, considered most prolific poet in Kannada literature and famous for his three-line poems called Thripadigalu.

Abalur has a very famous Basavanna Temple (Nandi) of pre modern times and worshipped by many villages in and around. The place is recognized by Karnataka Tourism. During the months of Feb/Mar the village folks arrange a jathre Mela or festival for the village deity, where people from neighboring villages visit the temple and offer prayers.

It was once known as a famous centre of Jainism. Details collected from Harihara's biography and poet Basava Purana mentions the dispute between Jainas and a proponent of Shaivism named Ekandata Ramaiah at Abalur in the second half of the twelfth century. Following this the Jaina images at Abalur were destroyed. A sculpture depicting the breaking up of the Jina image can be seen at the Someshwara temple at Abalur.

== See also ==
- Haveri
- Districts of Karnataka
