= Devagiri, Karnataka =

Village in Karnataka, India

Devagiri
- village
- Location in Karnataka, India Devagiri (India)
- Coordinates: 14.850°N 75.372°E
- Country: India
- State: Karnataka
- District: Haveri
- Taluk: Haveri

Government
  - Body: Gram Panchayat

Area
  - Total: 27.56 km^{2} (10.64 sq mi)

Population (2011)
  - Total: 8,826
  - Density: 320/km^{2} (830/sq mi)

Languages
  - Official: Kannada
- Time zone: UTC+5:30 (IST)
- PIN: 581 110
- Telephone code: 08375
- ISO 3166 code: IN-KA
- Vehicle registration: KA-27
- Sex ratio (2011): 992 ♀/1000 ♂
- Website: haveri.nic.in

Devagiri is the largest village in Haveri Taluk of Haveri district in the Indian state of Karnataka. It is about 7.5 km (4.7 mi) north from the Haveri city in NH-4. Local language is Kannada.

Total population of Devagiri is 8,826. Its sex ratio is 992 women for every 1000 men.

== Etymology ==
Although there are no clear answers to the derivation, the most popular belief is that the hill in the village upon which the village's major deity Girimalleshwara is placed is the reason for the name Devagiri, where Deva means deity and Giri means hill.

== Notable people ==
- Puttaraj Gawai was born here in 1914.
