= Akki Alur =

- Town
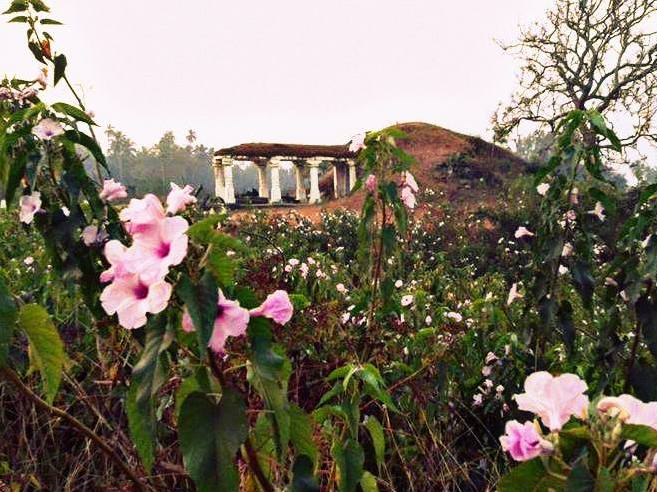
- Ishwar temple, Akki Alur

- Location in Karnataka, India Akki Alur (India)
- Coordinates: 14.7290000°N 75.169960°E
- Country: India
- State: Karnataka
- District: Haveri
- Taluk: Hangal

Population (2011)
  - Total: 12,294

Languages
  - Official: Kannada
- Time zone: UTC+5:30 (IST)
- PIN: 581102
- Vehicle registration: KA-27
- Nearest city: Haveri, Hubli, Sirsi

Akki Alur is a village in the southern state of Karnataka, India. It is located in the Hangal taluk of Haveri district in Karnataka.it lies in NH 766E

== Demographics ==
Akki Alur is a large village located in Hangal of Haveri district, Karnataka with total 2565 families residing. The Akki Alur village has population of 12294 of which 6217 are males while 6077 are females as per Population Census 2011.

In Akki Alur village population of children with age 0-6 is 1548 which makes up 12.59% of total population of village. Average Sex Ratio of Akki Alur village is 977 which is higher than Karnataka state average of 973. Child Sex Ratio for the Akki Alur as per census is 1010, higher than Karnataka average of 948.

Akki Alur village has higher literacy rate compared to Karnataka. In 2011, literacy rate of Akki Alur village was 86.65% compared to 75.36% of Karnataka. In Akki Alur Male literacy stands at 89.26% while female literacy rate was 83.96%.

As per constitution of India and Panchyati Raaj Act, Akki Alur village is administrated by Sarpanch (Head of Village) who is elected representative of village.
