= Sarvajna and Tiruvalluvar statues installation =

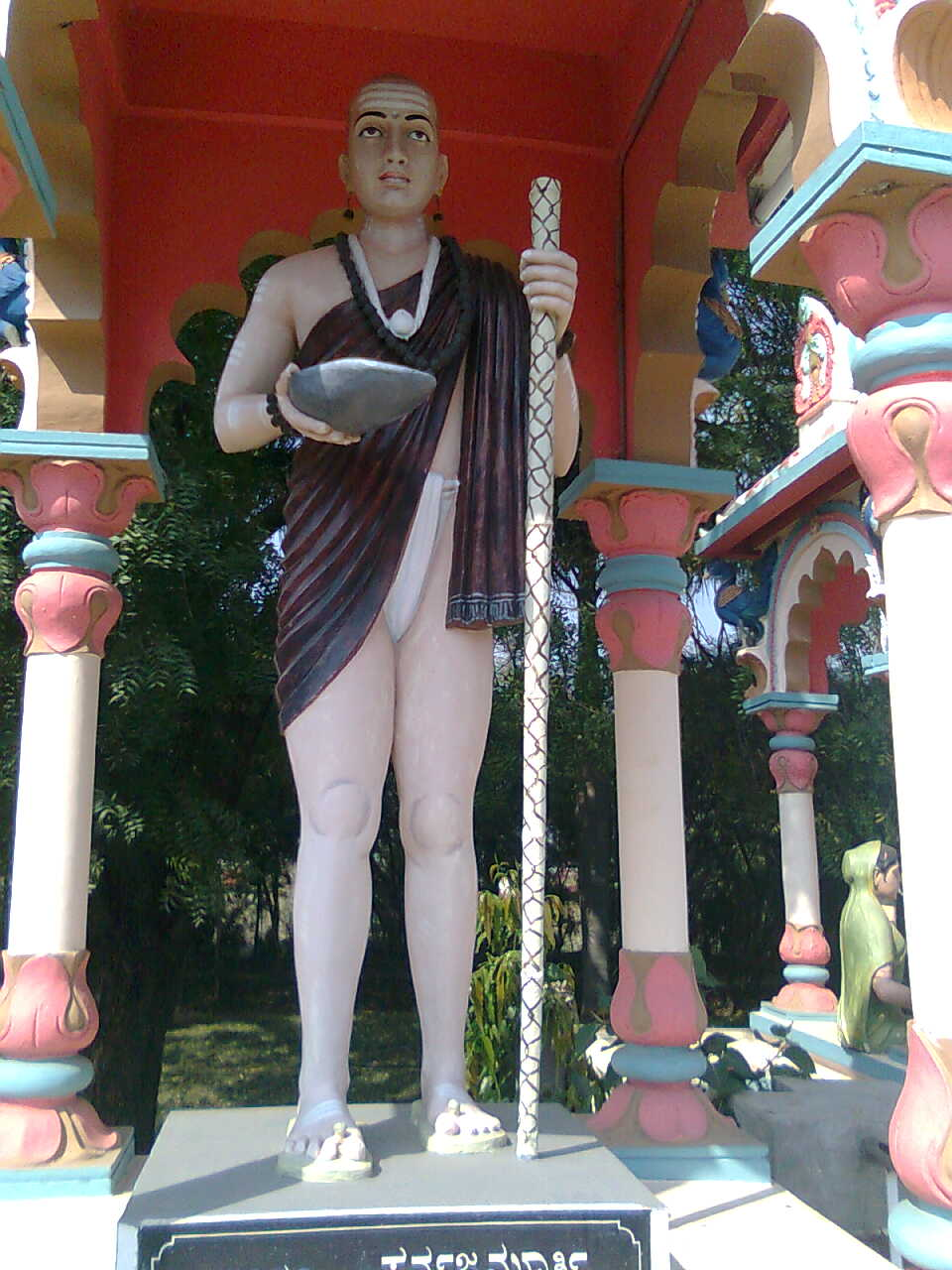
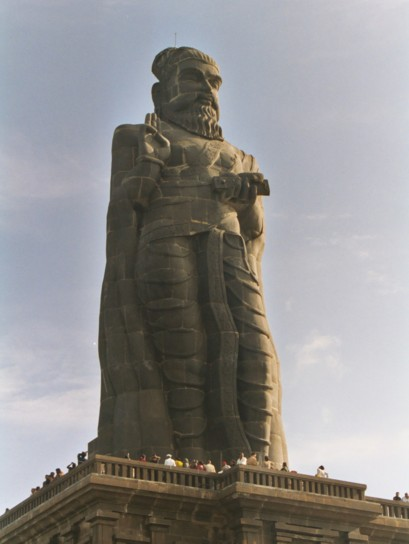
Statues of Sarvagna (left) and Valluvar (right)

Sarvajna and Tiruvalluvar are popular Kannada and Tamil poets, respectively. Statues of Sarvajna in Tamil Nadu and Tiruvalluvar in Karnataka has been unveiled in August 2009 as a symbolic effort to bolster ties between the two Indian states, whose relationship has been strained by issues related to sharing of Kaveri water and Hogenakkal water supply power project.

== Sarvajna ==
Sarvajña was a sixteenth-century poet in the Kannada language. He is famous for his pithy three-lined poems which are called tripadis, "with three padas, three-liners", a form of Vachanas. He is also referred to as Sarvagna in modern translation. In all, about 2000 three-liners are attributed to Sarvajna. Popular because of their alliterative structure and simplicity, they deal mainly with social, ethical and religious issues. A number of riddles are also attributed to Sarvajna.

== Tiruvalluvar ==
Tiruvalluvar was a Tamil poet-philosopher who wrote the Tirukkural, a work on ethics and morality in Tamil literature and is believed to have lived between 2nd century BCE and 5th century CE. The Tirukkural is divided into three sections known as books. Book One deals with aram or fundamental ethics of life, with conscience and honor; Book Two discusses porul or political or social realities or facts of life; and Book Three dwells on inbam or the human love. The first book has 38 chapters, the second has 70 chapters and the third has 25 chapters. Each chapters consists of 10 couplets or kurals, thus making 1330 couplets in total. The work emphasizes non-violence and moral vegetarianism as virtues for an individual. Tirukkural is one of the literary works in the world translated the most number of times. According to Institute of Asian Studies, Thiruvanmiyur, more than 40 translations are available.

== Tiruvalluvar statue ==
Tiruvalluvar statue has been unveiled in Ulsoor, Bengaluru in a small garden on the banks of Ulsoor Lake by the then Tamil Nadu Chief Minister M. Karunanidhi on 9 August 2009 in the presence of the then Karnataka Chief Minister B. S. Yediyurappa. The statue was installed and maintained by Bangalore Tamil Sangam.

== Sarvajna statue ==
Sarvajna statue has been unveiled in Ayanavaram park, Chennai, by the then Karnataka Chief Minister B. S. Yediyurappa in a ceremony that was presided over by the then Tamil Nadu Chief Minister, M. Karunanidhi. The statue is maintained by the Life Insurance Corporation of India.
