= Sarvajna =

Kannada poet, pragmatist and philosopher

Sarvajña
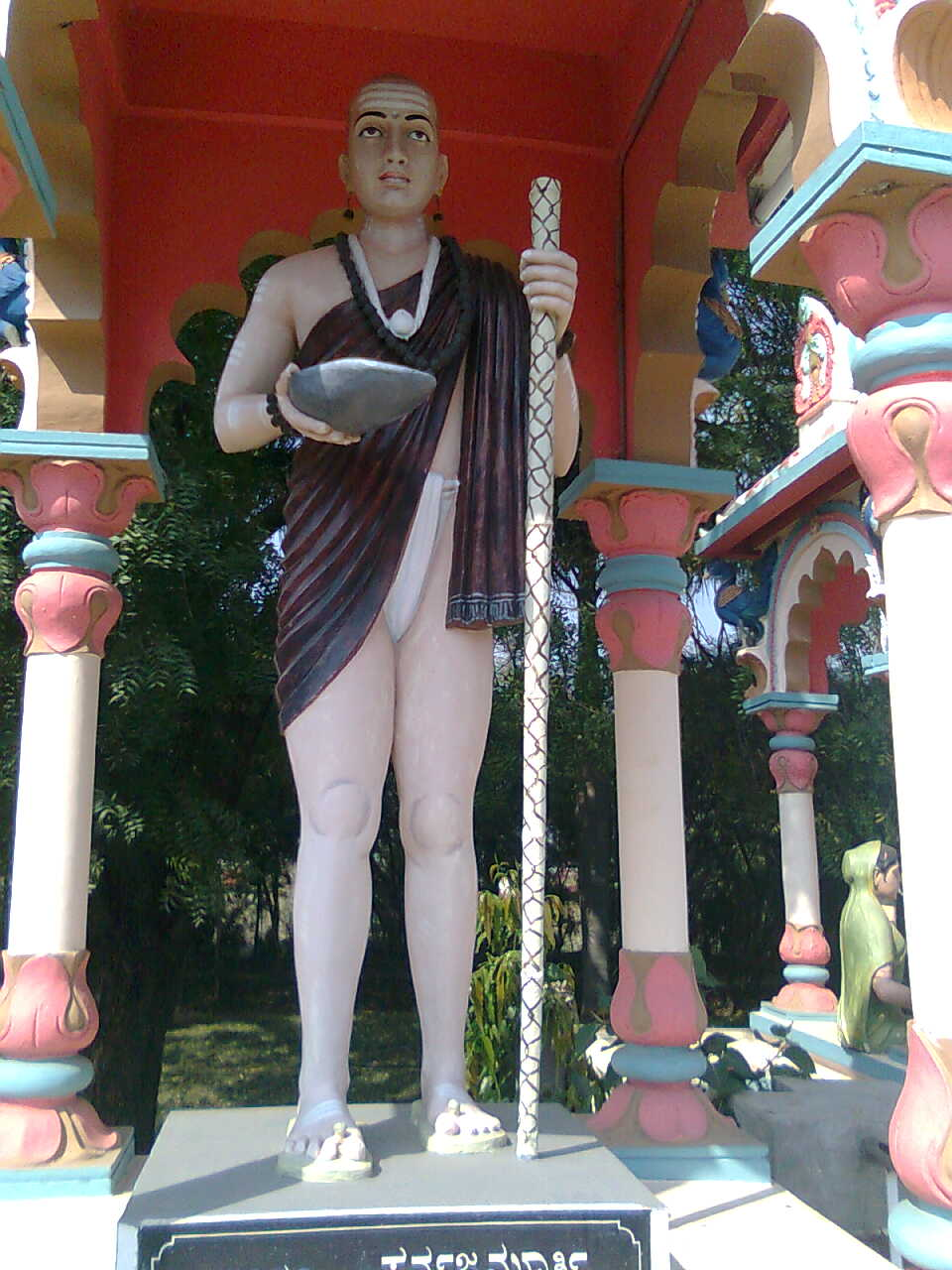
- Statue At Kudalasangama
- Born: Early 15th century Abalur, Hirekerur Taluk, Haveri District
- Died: Masur, Rattihalli Taluk, Haveri District
- Occupations: Poet, Pragmatist, Philosopher, Monk

Sarvajña was a Kannada poet, pragmatist and philosopher of the 16th century. The word "Sarvajna" in Sanskrit literally means "the all knowing". His father was Kumbara Malla and his mother was Mallaladevi. His birth anniversary is celebrated on February 20 every year. He belongs to the caste of Kumbara. He is famous for his pithy three-lined poems called tripadi (written in the native three-line verse metre, "with three padas, a form of Vachana"). He is also referred as Sarvagna in modern translation.

== Early life ==
Sarvajna renounced his parents at a young age, claiming his real parents were Shiva and Parvati. He then became a nomad, travelling and chanting his Vachanas.

== In popular culture ==
The 1965 Kannada movie Sarvagna Murthy starring Dr. Rajkumar chronicles the life of Sarvajna.

== See also ==
- Thiruvalluvar
- Vemana
- Sarvajna and Tiruvalluvar statue installation
