= Vani Sateesh =

- Born: Bangalore, Karnataka, India
- Genres: Carnatic music – Indian classical music
- Occupation: Musician
- Years active: 1990–present
- Website: http://www.vanisateesh.com

Vani Sateesh is a Carnatic vocalist.

== Music Training ==
Vani Sateesh's initial training was under the tutelage of her uncle Bellary M. Sheshagiri Achar. She later learnt from her father Bellary M. Venkateshachar and then from her brother Bellary M Raghavendra. She is currently under the tutelage of Padmabhushana Sri P.S.Narayanaswamy, a direct disciple of Sangeetha Kalanidhi Semmangudi Srinivasa Iyer.

== Performance ==
Vani started performing at a young age. Her first concert was at age 10; since then she has given numerous concerts both in India and abroad. In her earlier days, she gave numerous tala vadya concerts. She has also performed many jugalbandi with known Hindustani classical musicians. Vani Sateesh is an "A" grade artist of All India Radio and a "B High" Graded Composer of All India Radio. She has completed her Master in Music from the University of Mysore and received an Indian Government Scholarship for Young Artists.
