= Hangal =

Town in Karnataka

- town
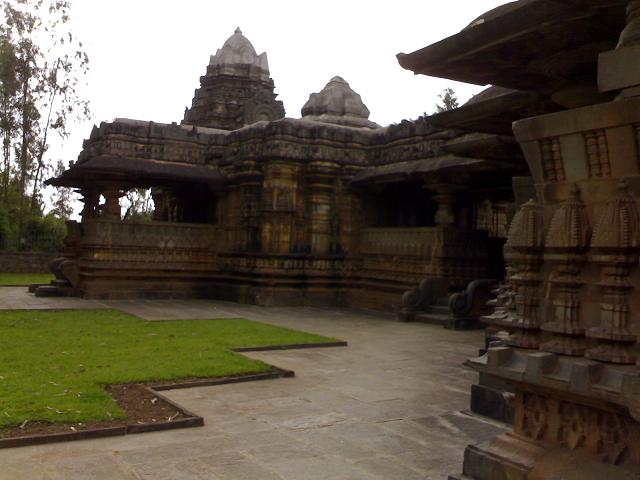
- Hangal Tarakeshwara temple

- Location in Karnataka, India Hangal (Karnataka)
- Coordinates: 14.767°N 75.126°E
- Country: India
- State: Karnataka
- District: Haveri
- Lok Sabha Constituency: Haveri
- Nearest Large City: Hubli-Dharwad
- Elevation: 555 m (1,821 ft)

Population (2011)
  - Total: 28,159

Languages
  - Official: Kannada
- Time zone: UTC+5:30 (IST)
- PIN: 581 104
- Telephone code: 08379
- ISO 3166 code: IN-KA
- Vehicle registration: KA-27
- Website: hanagaltown.gov.in

Hangal is a historic town in Karnataka. It is 80 km (50 mi) away from Hubli through NH 766E.

== Location ==
Hangal lies about 75 kilometres (47 mi) south of the city of Hubli-Dharwad, about 30 kilometres (19 mi) west of the Tungabhadra River and east of the Arabian Sea. It is located on state road one, running north to south. A nearby body of water is the Anakere lake. The town is on level terrain in an agricultural district.

== History ==
Hungal is recorded as Panungal in early documents. It was once the capital of a feudatory of the Kadambas. The Kadambas built temples in Hangal in the Jain tradition. In medieval epigraphs. According to local legends, it is believed to be the place where the Pandavas spent the thirteenth year of their exile.

Around 1031, the Hoysalas took and held Hangal. In 1060, Mallikarjuna of the Shilahara laid siege to Hangal.

In the 12th century, Hangal was held by the Kalalyani Chalukyas, rulers of the Deccan. The Chalukyas built temples in the Gadag architectural style, from grey-green coloured chloritic schist.

On 14 July 1800, English forces took Hangal from Dhoondia Punt Gocklah, a Marhatta rebel deserter.

Hangal is the birthplace of the renowned Hindustani classical vocalist Gangubai Hangal (1913–2009), one of the foremost exponents of the Kirana gharana and a recipient of the Padma Vibhushan.

== Demographics ==
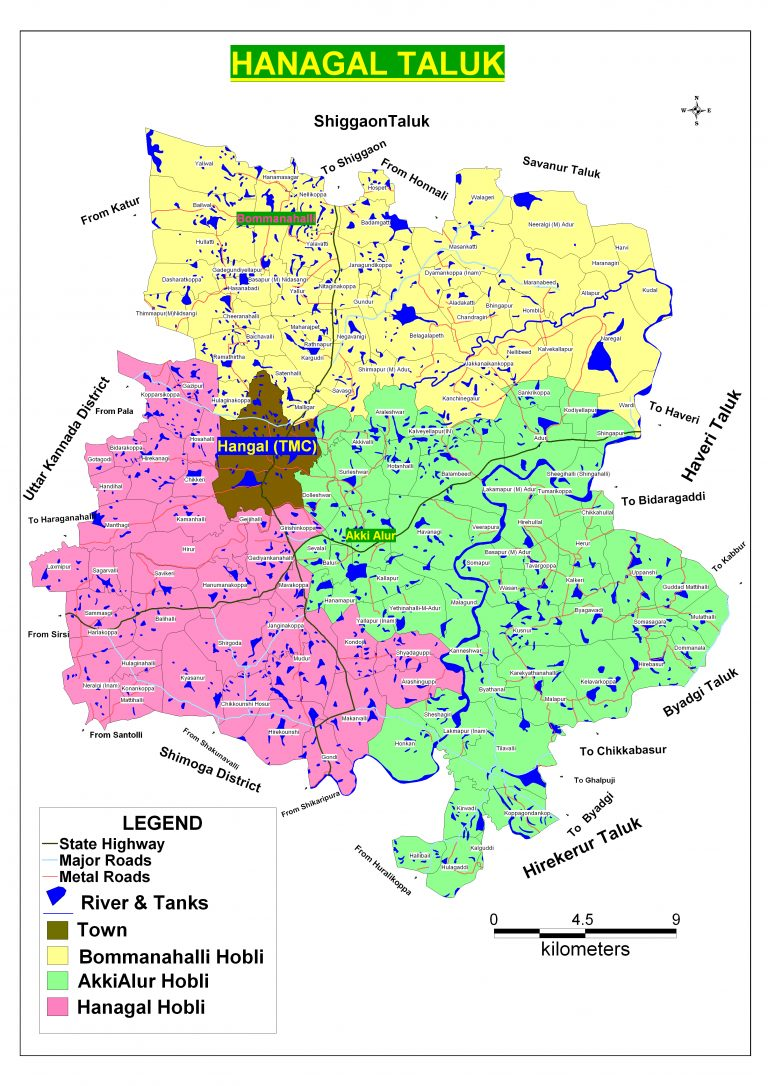
Hangal Taluk Map

As of 2001 India census, Hangal had a population of 25,011. Males constituted 51% of the population and females 49%. Hangal had an average literacy rate of 64%, higher than the national average of 59.5%: male literacy was 67%, and female literacy was 60%. 14% of the population is under six years of age.

== Politics ==
Srinivas Mane of Indian National Congress party is the MLA representing the Hangal (Vidhana Sabha constituency) since 2 November 2021.

== Transport ==
Hangal is approximately 370 kilometres (230 mi) from Bengaluru and 40 kilometres (25 mi) from Haveri. The town can be reached from Bengaluru via Chitradurga and Haveri and from Dharwad via Hubli and Shiggaavi. The nearest rail head is at Haveri (railway station code HVR).

== Temples ==
Hangal has many historic temples related to the Chalukyas and the Hoysalas.

=== Tarakeshwara Temple ===
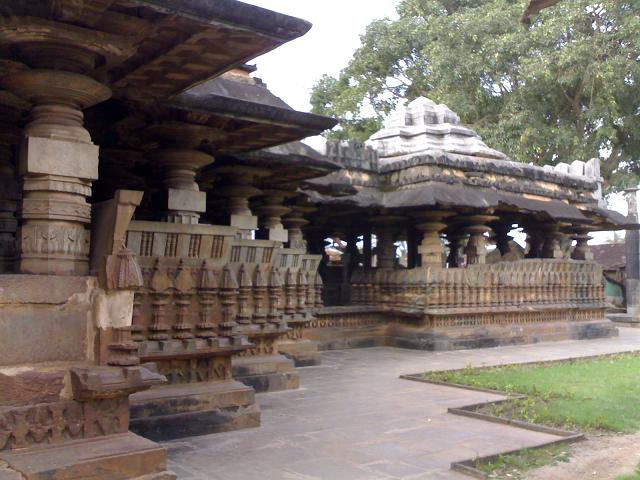
Hangal Tarakeshwara temple

The Tarakeshwara Temple is a large structure decorated with images and pillars dating to the Chalukya era in the mid-12th century and dedicated to the Hindu god Shiva in his form as Tarakeshwara. The images include scenes from the Ramayana.

The outer walls are designed with miniature shikaras of both Dravidian and Nagara style. The pillars of the open main hall are lathe turned stone. They have a bell-shaped section and other decorations including elephants and diamond shaped motifs in bands. The elephants are carved so there appears to be a space between their trunks and the pillars. The band motifs vary in detail. The temple main hall has a large domed ceiling. It consists of concentric circles of cusped moldings. At the apex, the ceiling falls rosette or pendant design. The overlying roof is a stepped pyramid shape.

Nearby is the ramal, an octagonal piece of stone in a corbelled lotus shape. It is 30 feet (9.1 m) and is supported on eight pillars. There are memorial stones carved with religious (Mastigallu) and military (Veeragallu) scenes. Eight of them are guardians of eight cardinal points.

There is a sanctuary adjoining the main hall. The Nandi pavilion rests on twelve pillars and contains balcony seating. There is also a Ganesha temple of the Nagara style (northern curvilinear) shikhara (miniature temple decorations.)

=== Jain temple at the fort ===
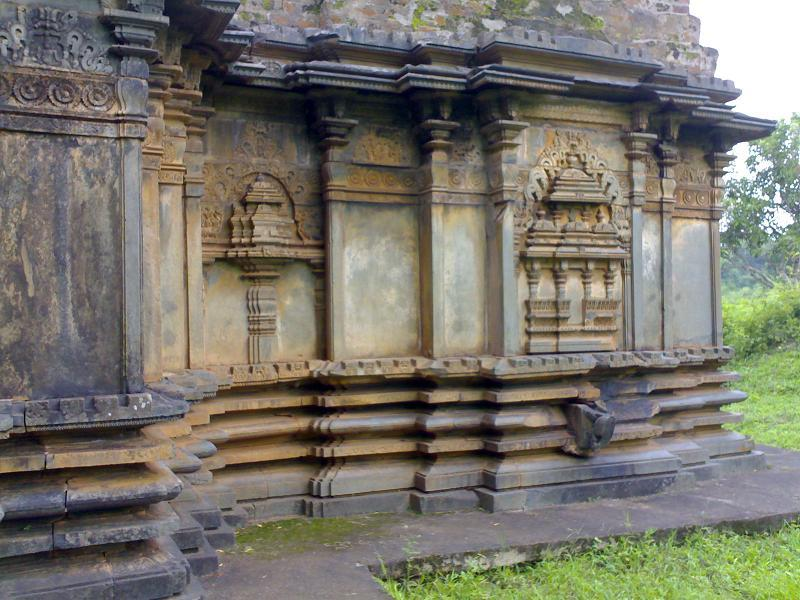
Temple at the department of horticulture

The Jain temple in the Hangal fort is located on the premises of the department of horticulture. It dates to 1150 AD. The temple in the Hoysala style is beautifully decorated but there is need of conservation and restoration. The temple was built on a stepped plan. It had an open hall and sanctuary, now in ruins. The sculptural decoration included flowers, garlands, torana, animals, birds and deities. It was especially elaborate in the upper portion of the walls. The temple walls are also decorated with thin pilasters. The open hall has lathe turned pillars.

== Lord Sarahunaath Temple ==
Lord Sarahunaath temple in the Suraleshwara near Hangal.

=== Veerabhadra Temple ===
The Veerabhadra temple is also located at the Hangal fort. Although highly decorated, it is in need of restoration work.

=== Billeshwara Temple ===
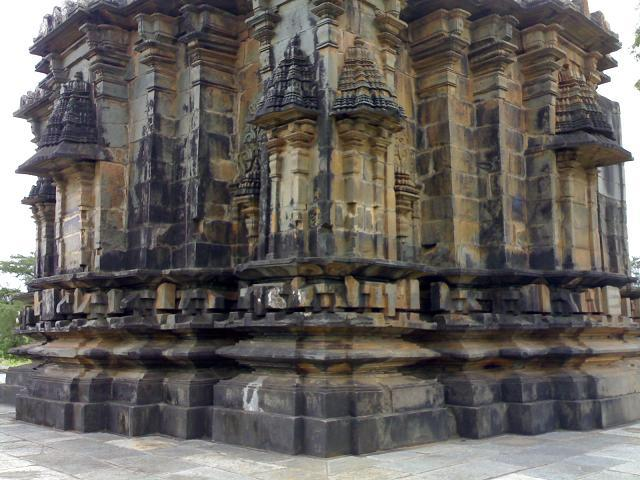
Billeshwara temple

The Billeshwara temple is in the Hoysala style. This temple has elaborately carved jambs on the doorframe of the garbhagudi. At the bottom of each side, there are five carved figures. Manmatha is in the central projection. Rati is at his side. Daksha (the goat headed deity) is also present and all are flanked by attendants. The temple has a sanctuary face which is incomplete. The temple outer walls are decorated with designs of temple towers and carved diamond shaped depressions. The square panels show carved serpents with intertwined tails, animals, musicians, and foliage.

Photo Gallery
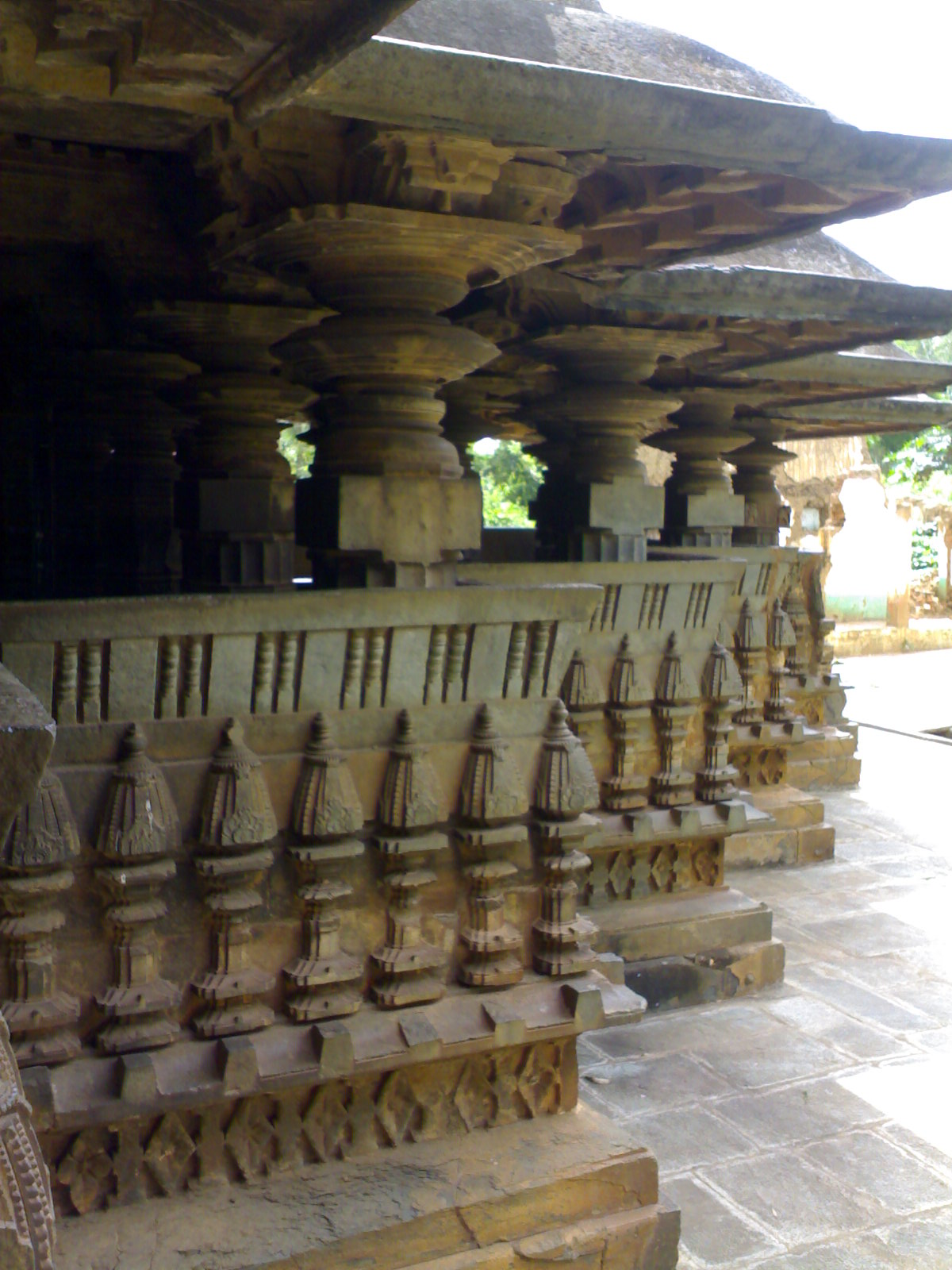
Hangal Tarakeshwara temple, Karnataka, India

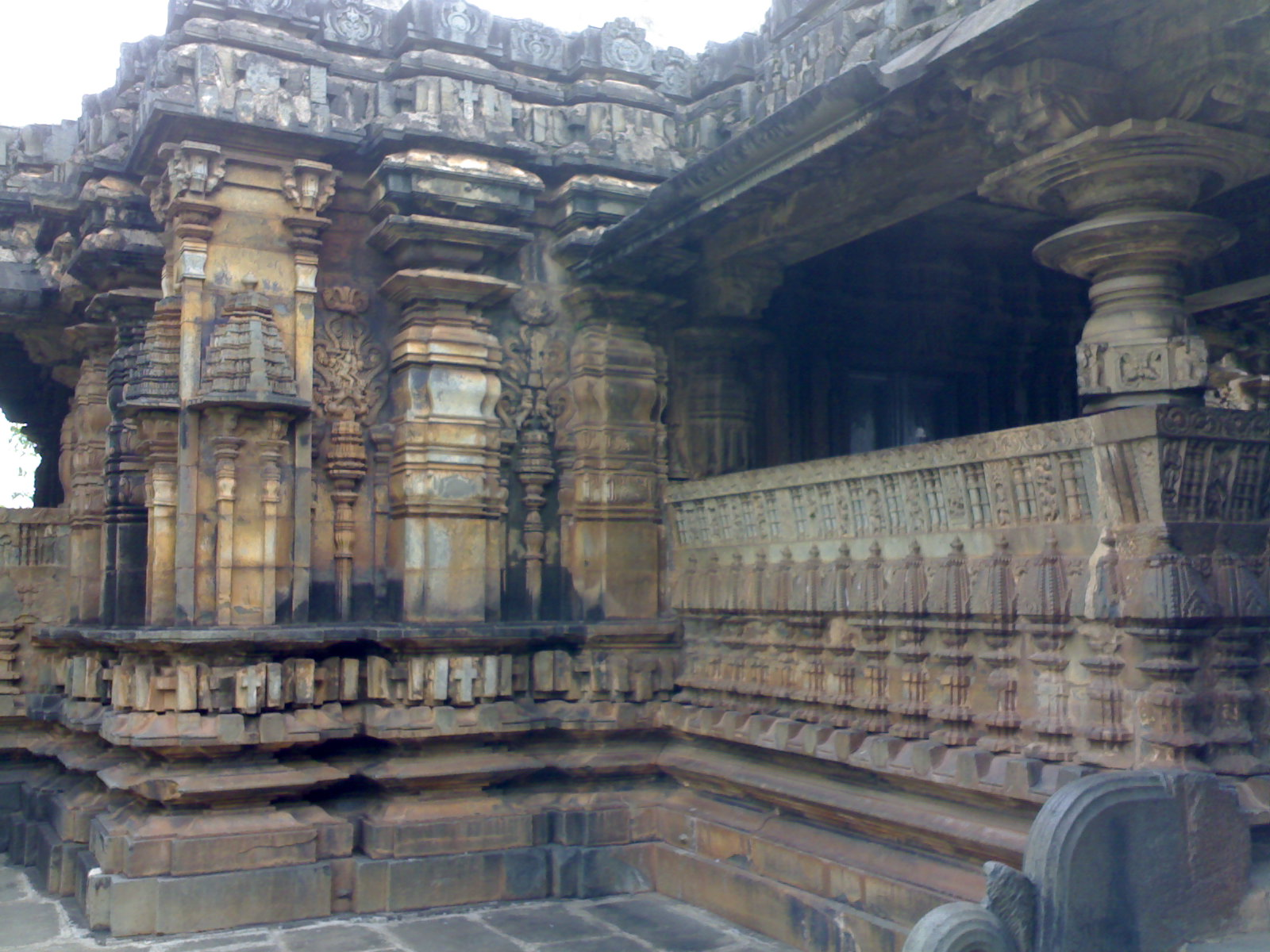
Hangal Tarakeshwara temple, Karnataka, India

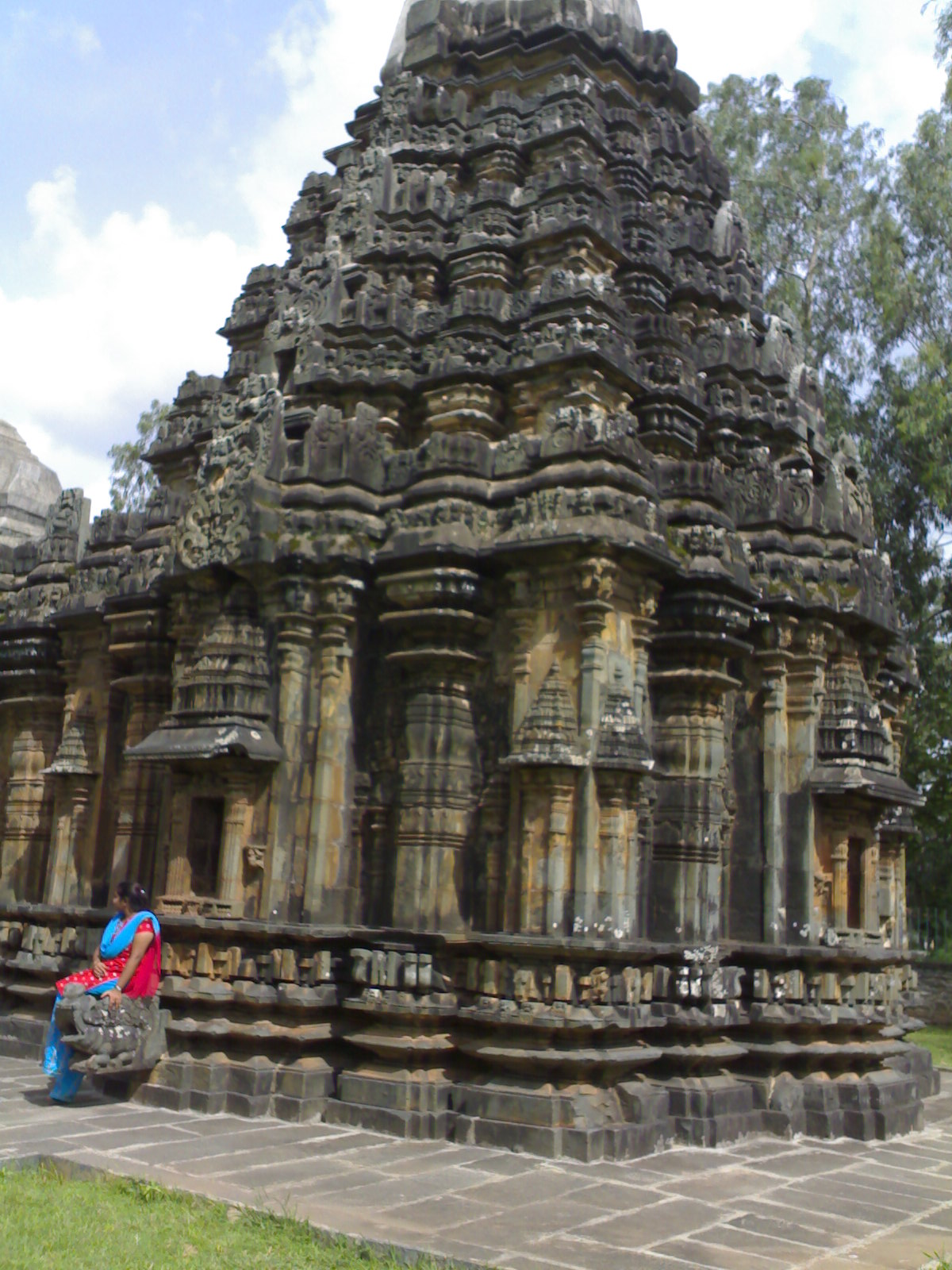
Hangal Tarakeshwara temple, Karnataka, India

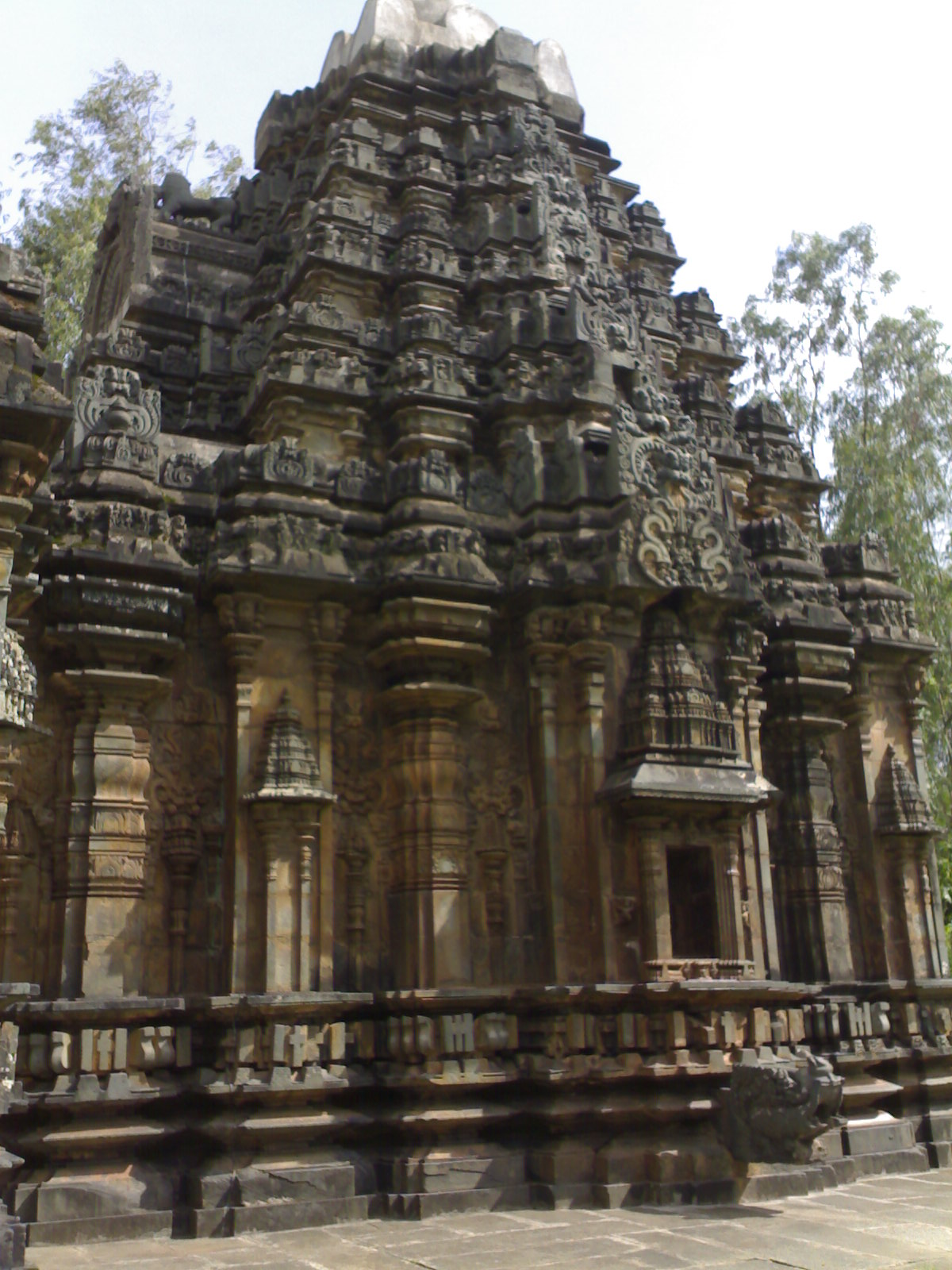
Hangal Tarakeshwara temple, Karnataka, India

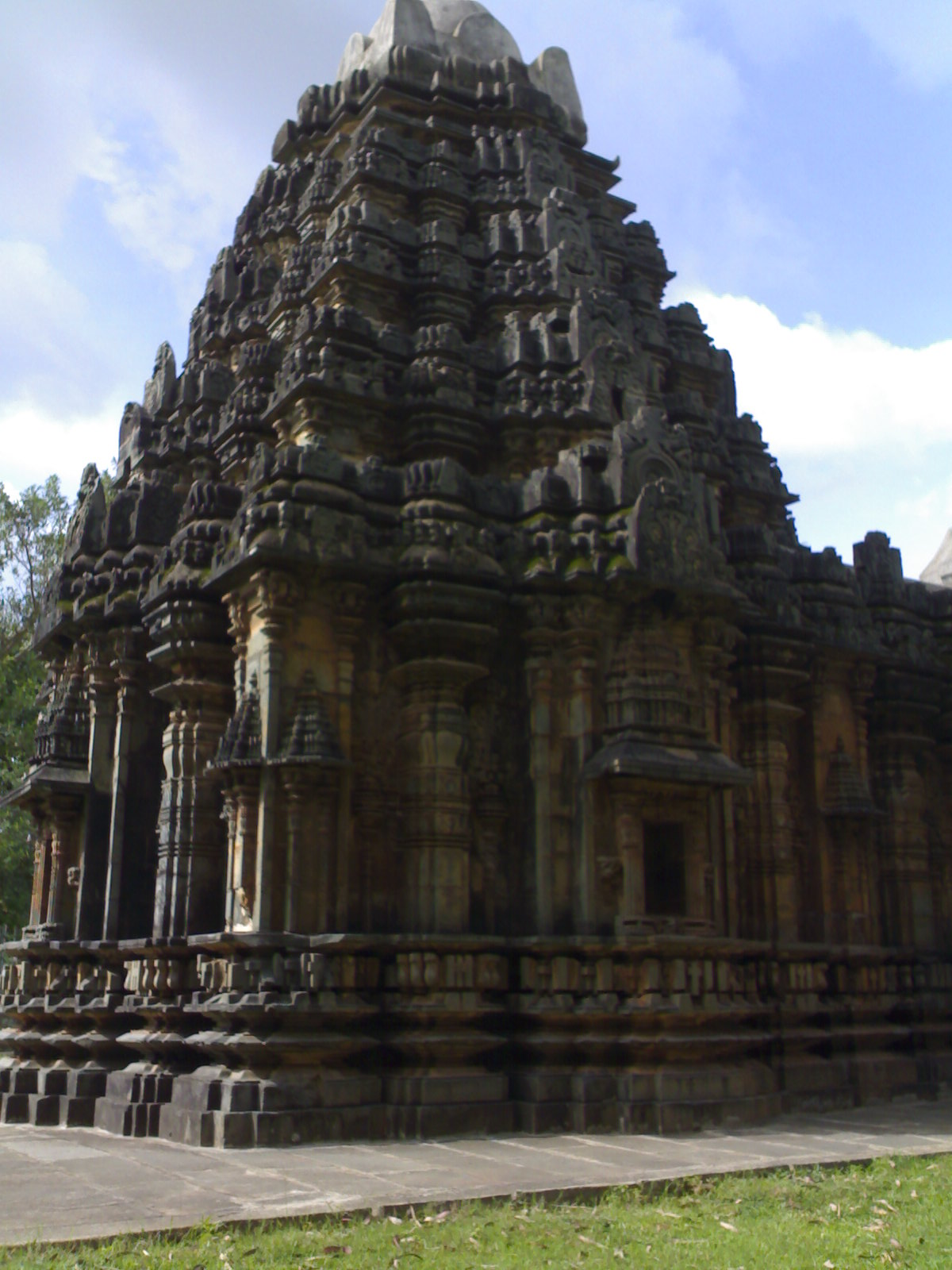
Hangal Tarakeshwara temple, Karnataka, India

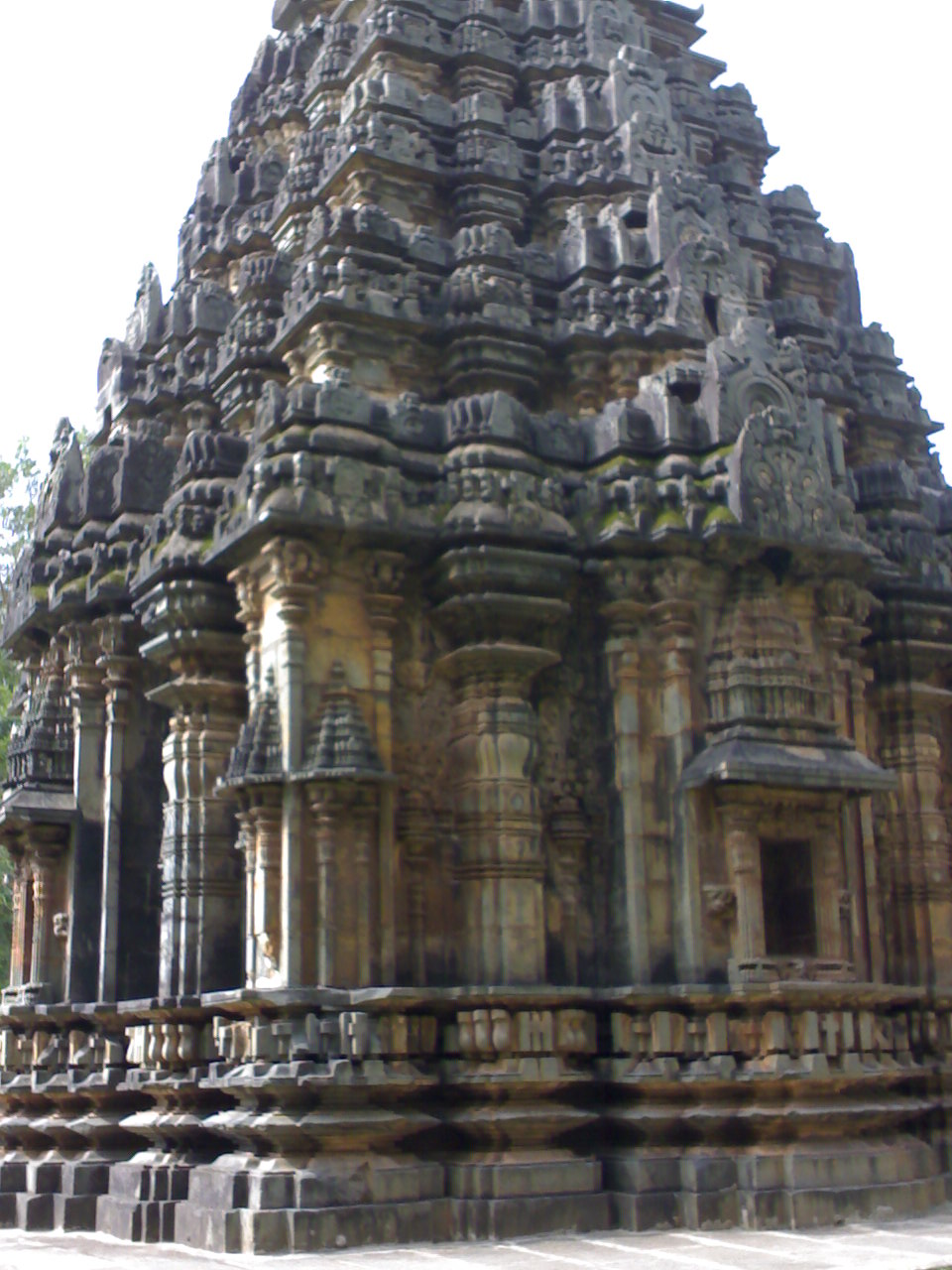
Hangal Tarakeshwara temple, Karnataka, India

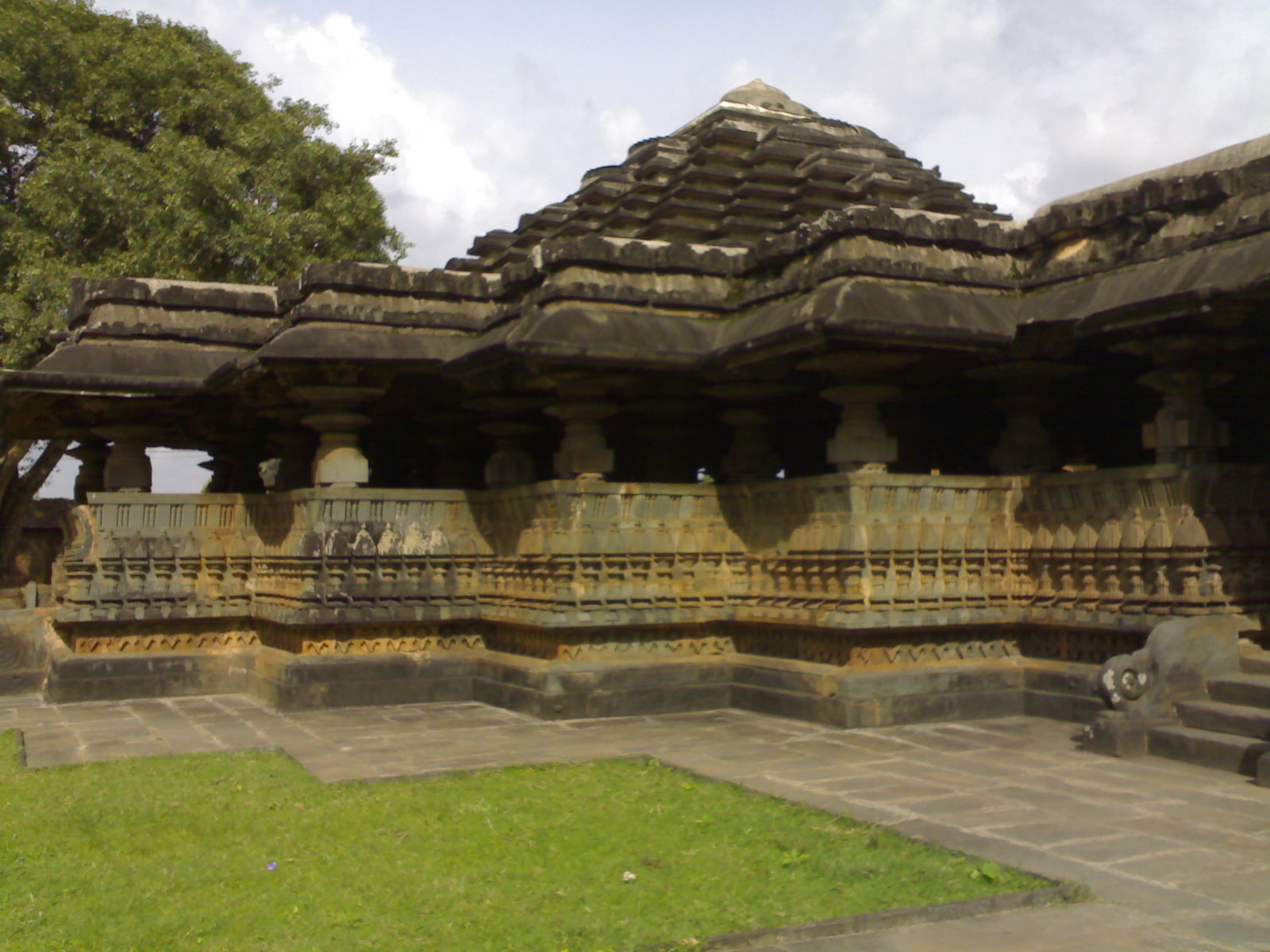
Hangal Tarakeshwara temple, Karnataka, India

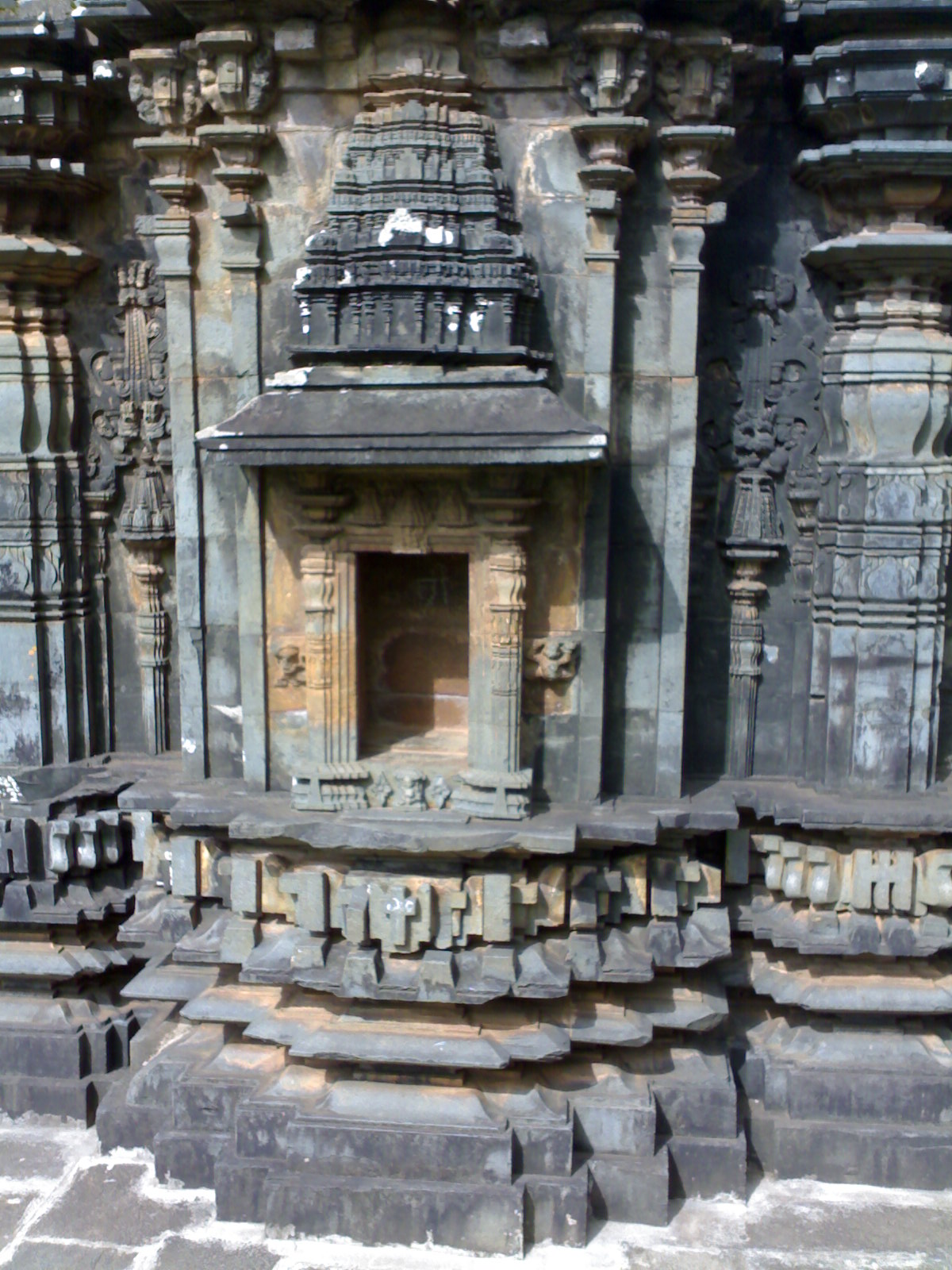
Hangal Tarakeshwara temple, Karnataka, India

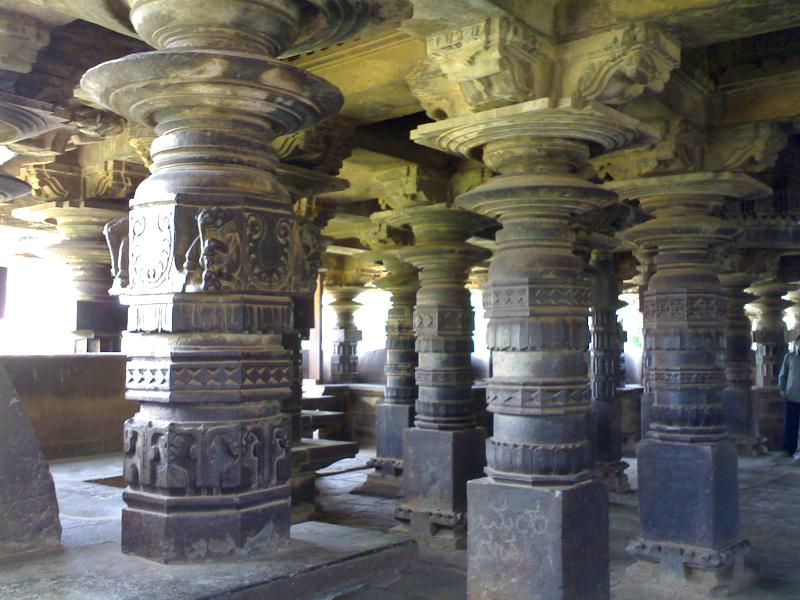
Pillars at the Tarakeshwara temple

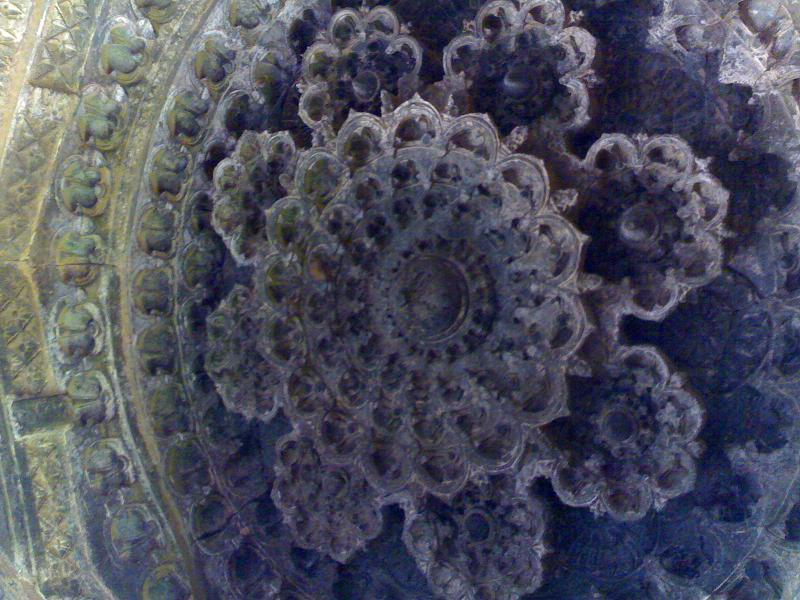
Domed ceiling in Tarakeshwara temple

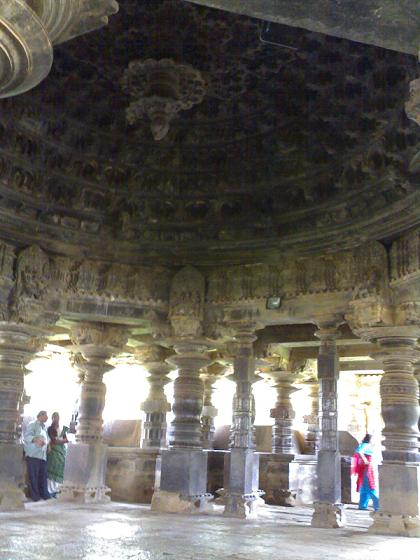
Domed ceiling in the main hall at Tarateshwara temple

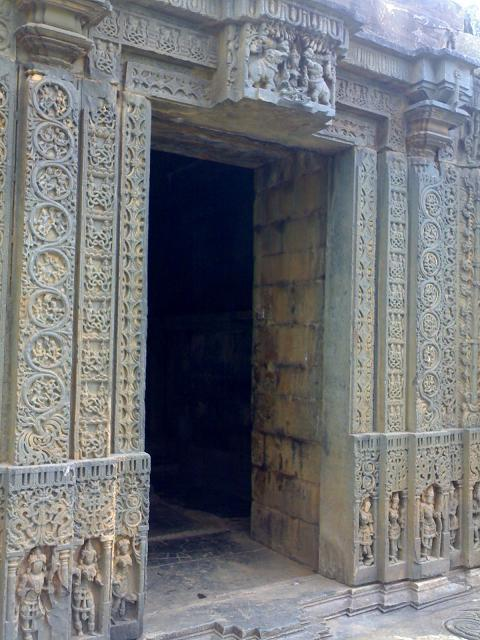
Billeshwara temple

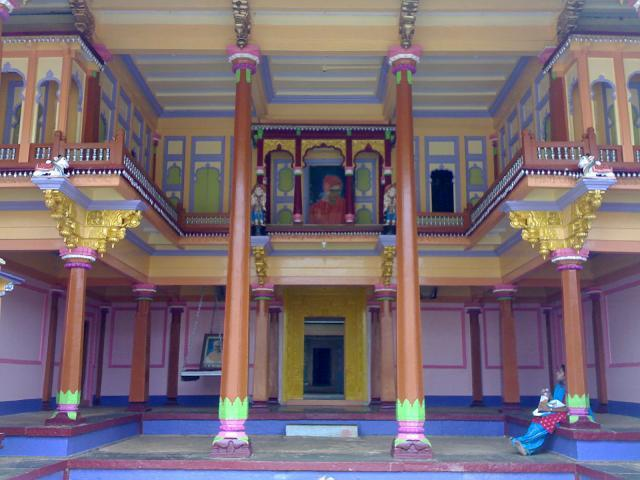
Kumaraswamy matha

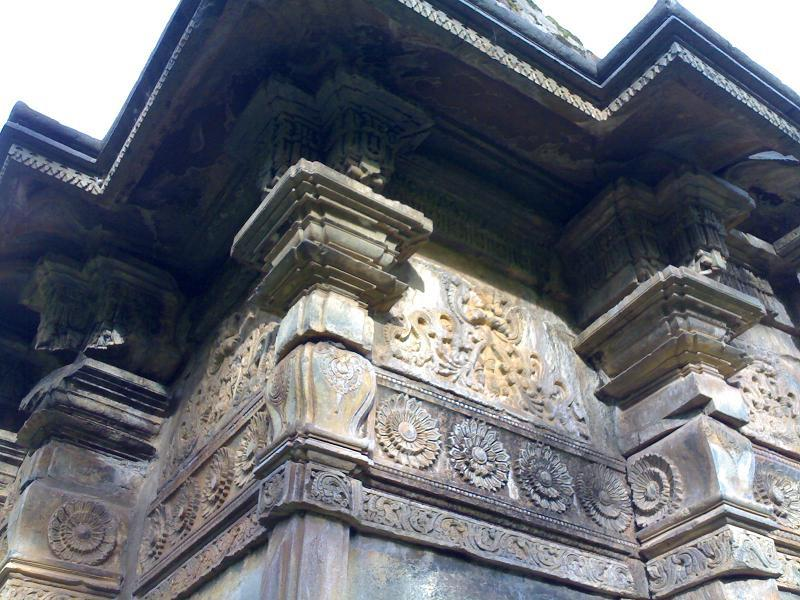
Temple at the department of horticulture

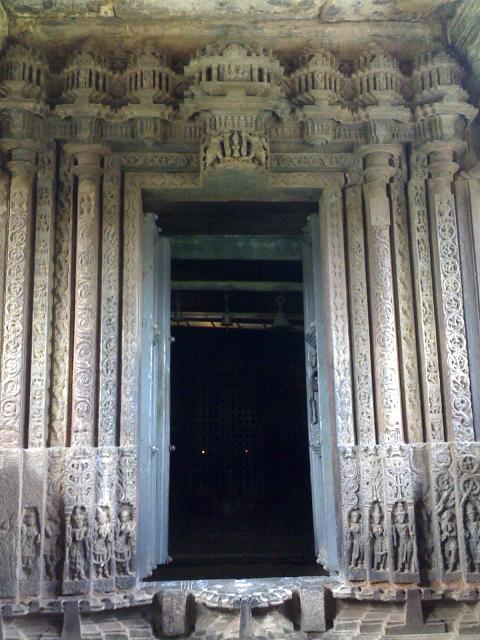
Entrance to Garbhagudi temple

== See also ==
- Akki Alur
- Kadambas
- Western Chalukyas
- Banavasi
- Halasi
- Kundgol
- Balligavi
- Haveri
- Sagara
- Belagalpeth-Nissimeshwara Nalagipawadmath Temple
- North Karnataka
- Tourism in North Karnataka
- Lakshmeshwar
- Chaudayyadanapura
- Galaganatha
- Dilwara Temples, Mount Abu, Rajasthan
- Kaitabheshvara Temple, Kubatur
