= Hirekerur =

Hirekeruru
- Town
- Location in Karnataka, India
- Coordinates: 14.47°N 75.38°E
- Country: India
- State: Karnataka
- District: Haveri
- Lok Sabha Constituency: Haveri

Population (2011)
  - Total: 15,874

Languages
  - Official: Kannada
- Time zone: UTC+5:30 (IST)
- PIN: 581 111
- Area code: 08376
- Vehicle registration: KA-68 Ranebennur
- Website: hirekerurtown.mrc.gov.in

Hirekerur taluk, a part of Malenadu region, is a panchayat town in Haveri district in the Karnataka state. The name "the village of the big pond" (from the components "hire" "ಹಿರೆ", big; "kere" "ಕೆರೆ", pond; and "Ooru" "ಊರು", village). The name is pronounced as "Hire kere oor" and It is also known as Land of Sarvajña since the famous Kannada poet Sarvajña was born here.

== Geography ==
Hirekerur is located at 14.47°N 75.38°E. It has an average elevation of 619 metres (2030 ft).

== Demographics ==
As of 2001, according to the India census, Hirekerur has a population of 15,874. Males constitute 51% of the population and females 49%. Hirekerur has an average literacy rate of 71%, higher than the national average of 59.5%: male literacy is 76%, and female literacy is 66%. In Hirekerur, 13% of the population is under six years of age.

The taluq of Hirekerur comprises over more than 130 villages.

== Religion and Culture ==
Hirekerur houses a famous Durga Devi temple, located close to the village's 900-acre (3.6 km^{2}) lake, Durga devi kere.

== Transport ==
Hirekerur is served by buses operated by the NWKRTC. It was one of the first town in Haveri district to receive bus services. It is not yet connected by Rail and Air.

=== Birthplace of Sarvajna ===
Abalur, within the Hirekerur taluq and 12 km from Hirekerur village, was the birthplace of the Kannada-language poet Sarvajña.
