= Haveri =

- City
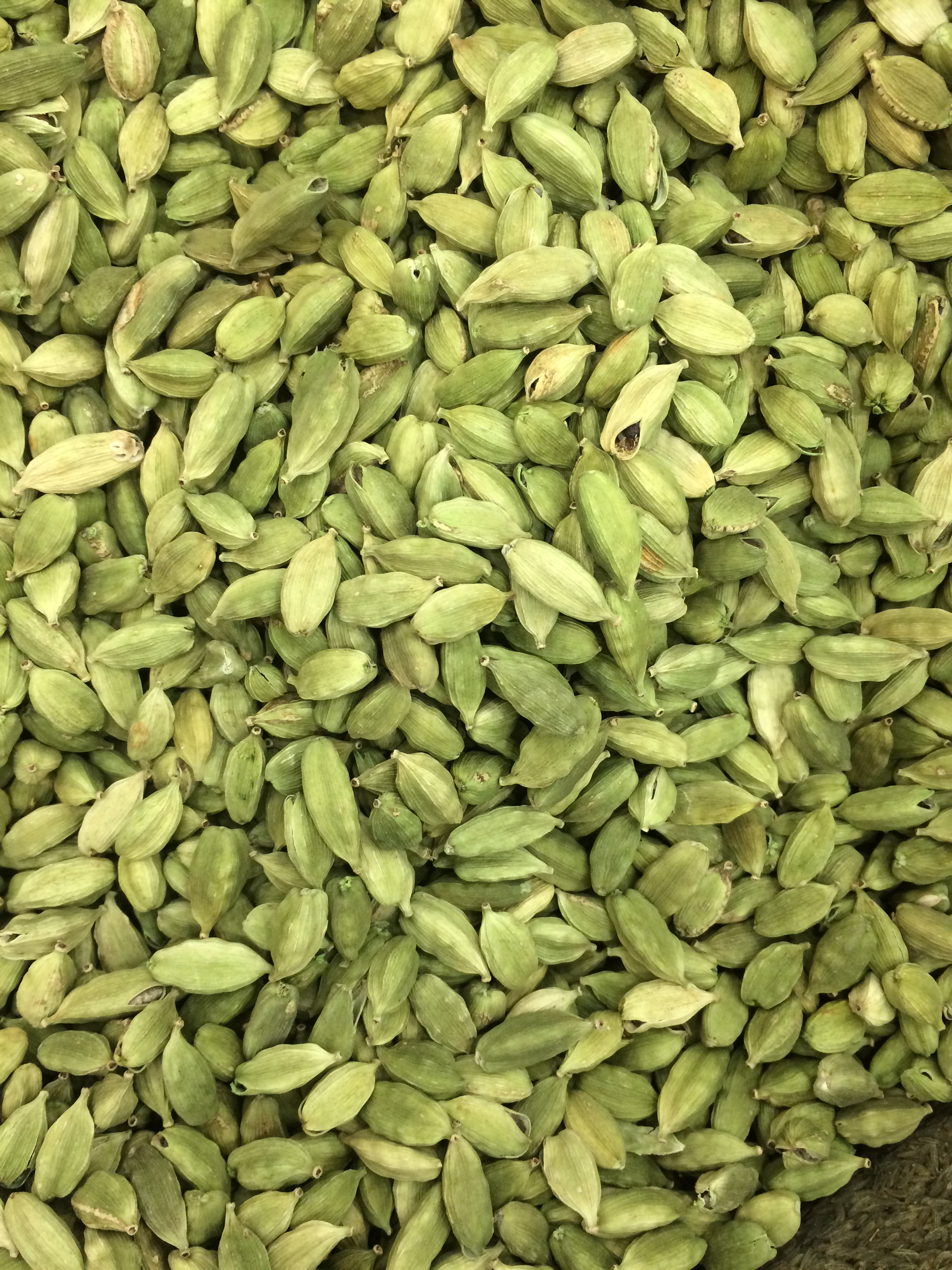
- Yalakki
- Nickname: Yalakki Kampina Nadu (The land of Cardamom smell)
- Interactive map of Haveri
- Coordinates: 14°47′38″N 75°24′14″E
- Country: India
- State: Karnataka
- District: Haveri

Government
  - Body: City Municipal corporation

Area
  - Total: 26.19 km^{2} (10.11 sq mi)
- Elevation: 571 m (1,873 ft)

Population (2011)
  - Total: 67,102
  - Density: 2,562/km^{2} (6,636/sq mi)
- Time zone: UTC+5:30 (IST)
- PIN: 581 110
- Telephone code: 08375
- Vehicle registration: KA-27
- Official language: Kannada
- Website: havericity.mrc.gov.in

Haveri is a city and headquarters of Haveri district of Karnataka State in India. Haveri is famous for its cardamom garlands, Byadagi red chillies and Hukkeri Math. Around 25 km away, there is a place called Bada, which is the birthplace of 16-century poet Kanakadasa.

== Etymology ==
The name Haveri is derived from the Kannada words haavu and keri, which means place of snakes.

== Tourist attractions of Haveri ==
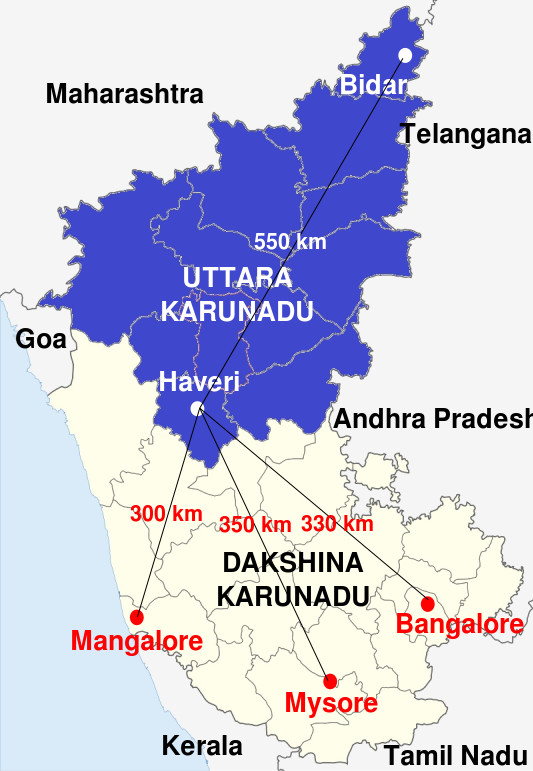
Distance from the major cities of Karnataka to Haveri

- Siddheshvara Temple

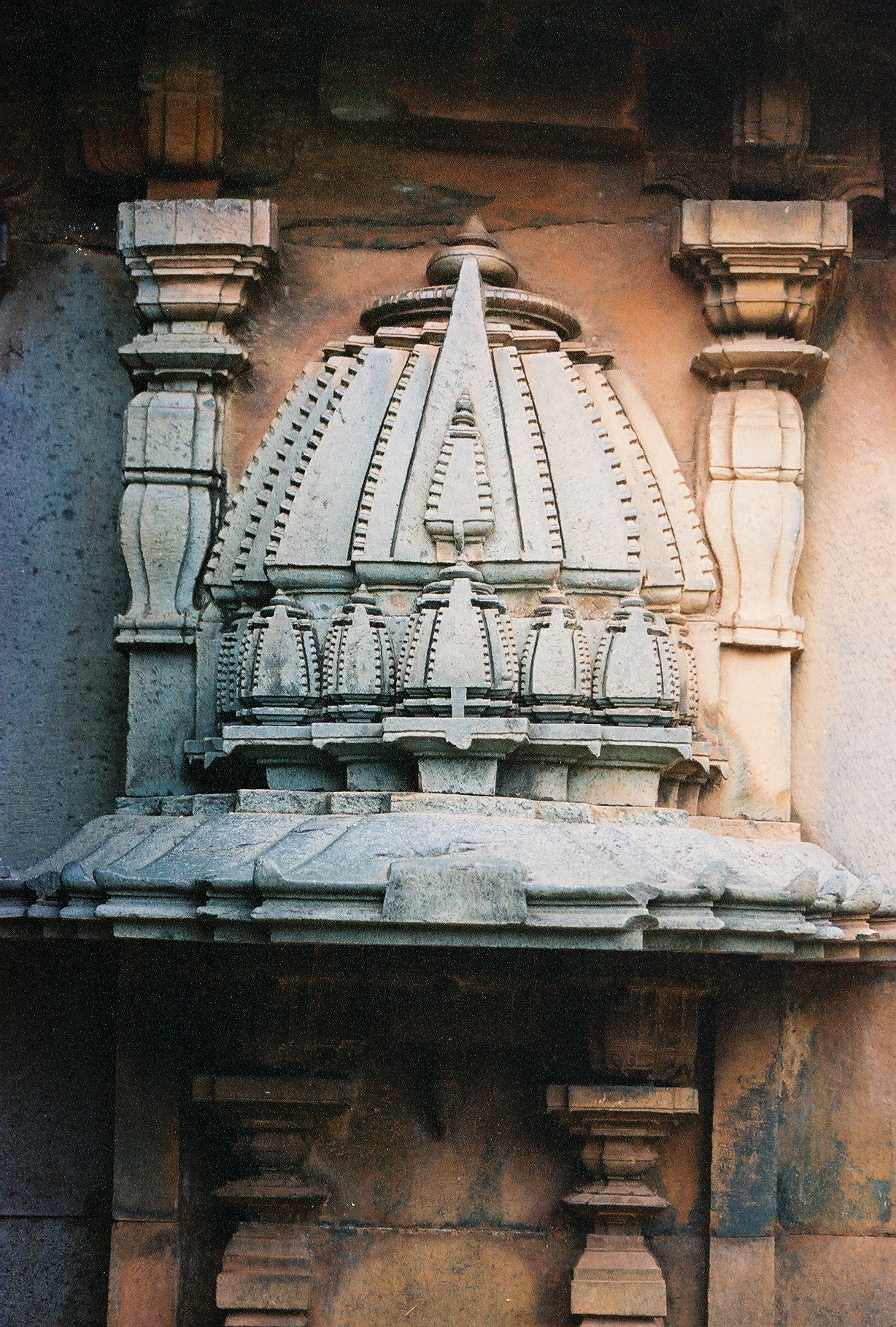
Nagara style tower

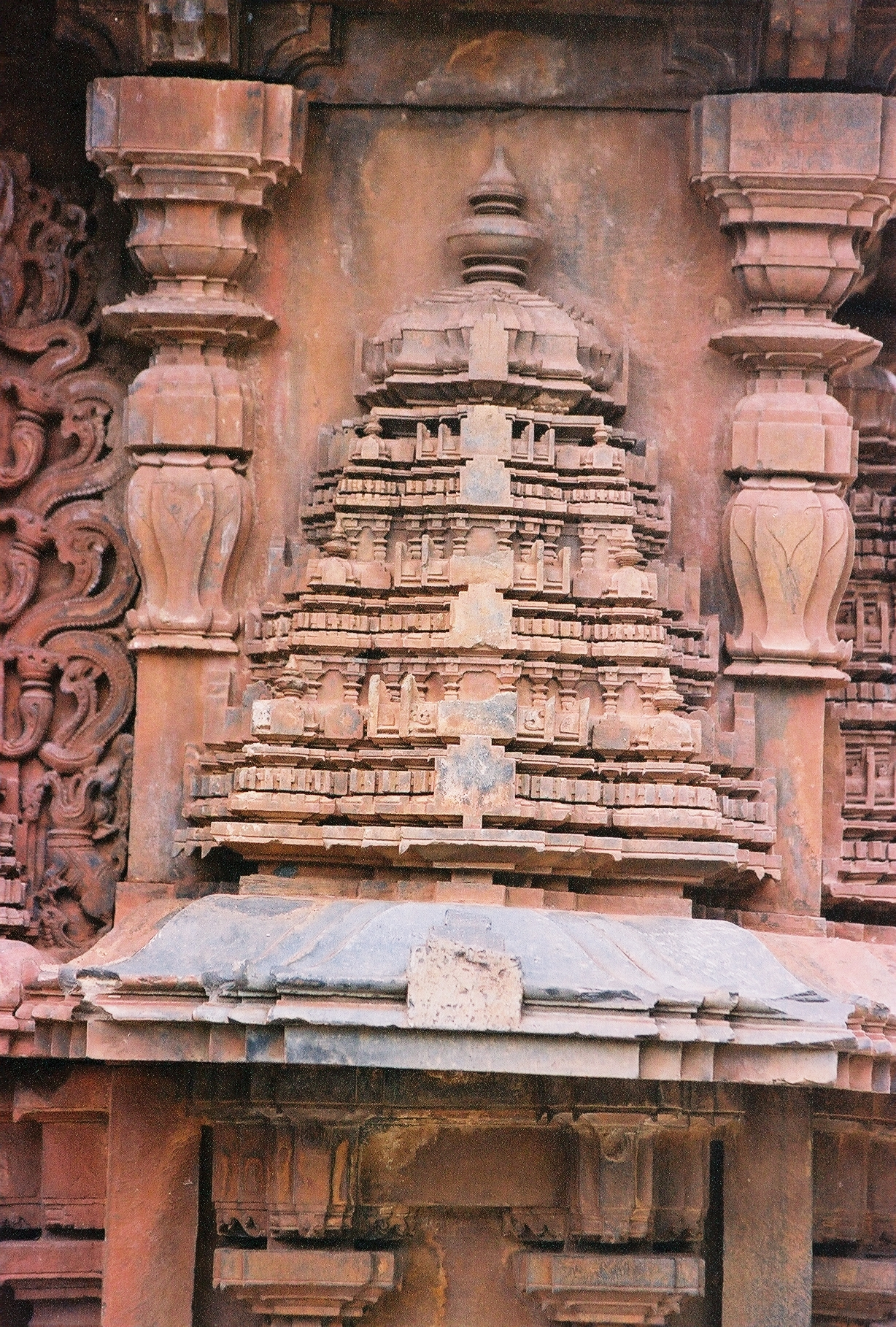
Dravida style tower

The centre of Western Chalukya architectural developments was the region including present-day Bagalkot, Gadag, Koppal, Haveri and Dharwad districts;

Siddheshwara temple at Haveri a staggered square plan with dravida articulation and superstructure, 11th century CE. Miniature decorative dravida and nagara style towers at Siddheshvara Temple in Haveri

- Basavanna Temple
- Utsav Rock Garden is situated at Gotagodi on NH-48 Shiggaon Taluk. It is blended with both modern and art where more than 1000 real life size sculptures are present. It has got 8 world records. It is a unique garden in the whole world.

Mini Vidhan Soudha, officially called Zilla Aadalitha Bhavan

== Geography ==
Haveri is located at 14.8°N 75.4°E. It has an average elevation of 572 metres (1876 feet).

== Climate ==
Climate data for Haveri (1991–2020)
Month	Jan	Feb	Mar	Apr	May	Jun	Jul	Aug	Sep	Oct	Nov	Dec	Year
Record high °C (°F)	34.4 (93.9)	38.0 (100.4)	40.0 (104.0)	41.2 (106.2)	40.4 (104.7)	38.2 (100.8)	33.0 (91.4)	33.0 (91.4)	34.5 (94.1)	34.4 (93.9)	35.1 (95.2)	34.0 (93.2)	41.2 (106.2)
Mean daily maximum °C (°F)	30.7 (87.3)	33.0 (91.4)	35.4 (95.7)	36.2 (97.2)	34.7 (94.5)	29.4 (84.9)	27.3 (81.1)	27.1 (80.8)	28.6 (83.5)	30.1 (86.2)	30.2 (86.4)	30.0 (86.0)	31.0 (87.8)
Mean daily minimum °C (°F)	14.6 (58.3)	16.6 (61.9)	19.7 (67.5)	22.0 (71.6)	22.6 (72.7)	21.8 (71.2)	21.5 (70.7)	21.1 (70.0)	20.9 (69.6)	20.2 (68.4)	17.5 (63.5)	15.1 (59.2)	19.4 (66.9)
Record low °C (°F)	7.4 (45.3)	11.2 (52.2)	13.0 (55.4)	15.8 (60.4)	17.4 (63.3)	16.4 (61.5)	15.2 (59.4)	15.1 (59.2)	15.8 (60.4)	13.0 (55.4)	8.4 (47.1)	9.0 (48.2)	7.4 (45.3)
Average rainfall mm (inches)	4.8 (0.19)	0.4 (0.02)	10.4 (0.41)	41.9 (1.65)	71.5 (2.81)	110.5 (4.35)	163.3 (6.43)	154.3 (6.07)	98.1 (3.86)	132.1 (5.20)	30.8 (1.21)	4.0 (0.16)	822.1 (32.37)
Average rainy days	0.2	0.1	0.8	2.9	4.6	9.5	14.6	13.3	9.7	6.5	1.7	0.3	64.3
Average relative humidity (%) (at 17:30 IST)	35	32	31	38	51	73	82	83	76	65	53	44	55
Source: India Meteorological Department

== Education ==
There are a number of private, aided and government schools and colleges that offer courses in PU, degree and master's degrees.

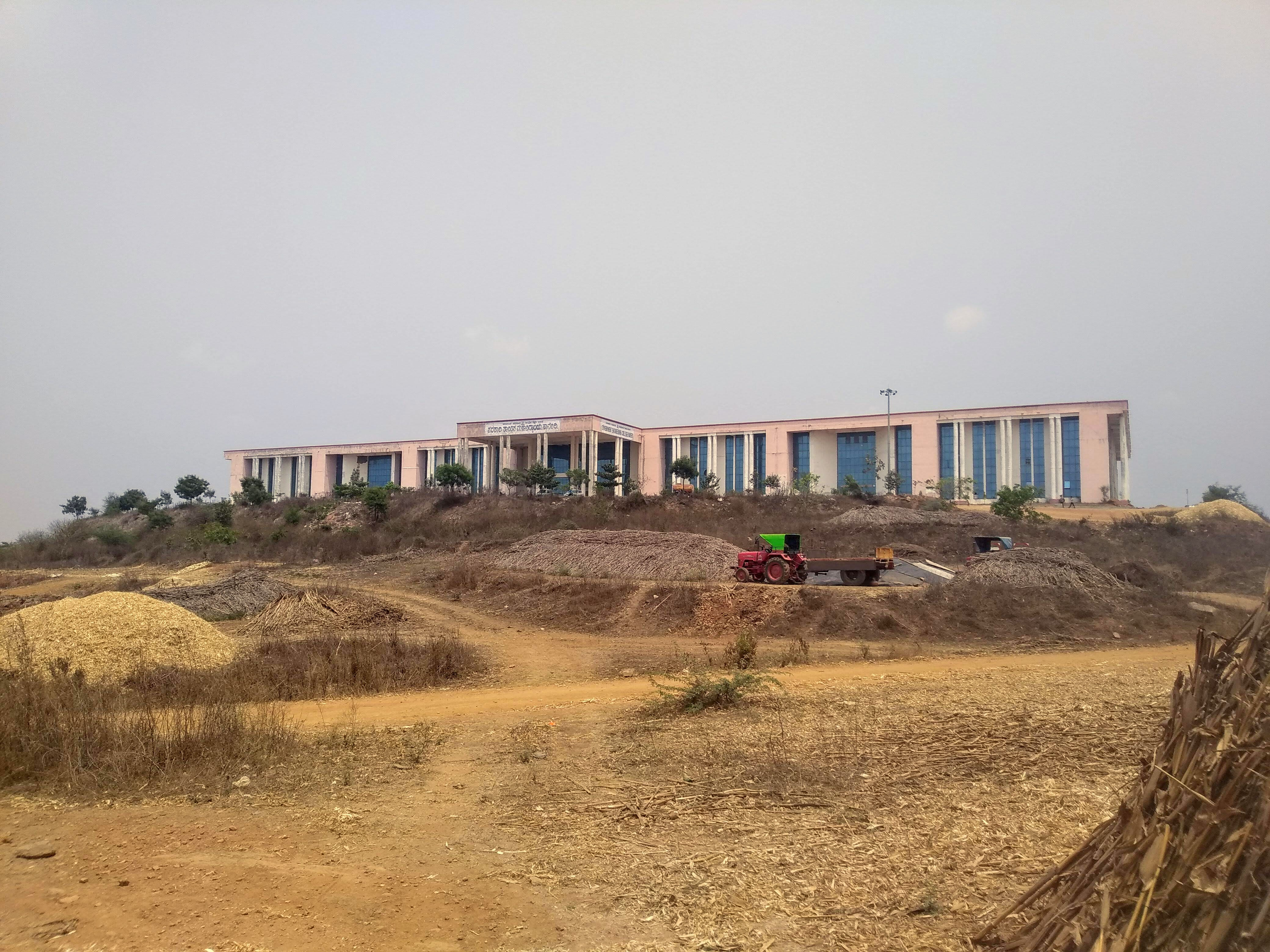
Government Engineering college, Devagiri, Haveri

There is also a new govt medical college started in haveri in 2020.

== Demographics ==
As of 2011 India census, Haveri had a population of 67102. Males constitute 51% of the population and females 49%. Haveri has an average literacy rate of 70%, higher than the national average of 59.5%: male literacy is 76%, and female literacy is 64%. In Haveri, 13% of the population is under 6 years of age.

== Notable people ==
- Mailara Mahadevappa
- Gudleppa Hallikeri
- Chandrashekhar Patil
- sarvagna
- Basavaraj Bommai
- Shivkumar Udasi

== See also ==
- Western Chalukya
- Western Chalukya temples
- Western Chalukya architecture
- Bankapura
- Bagali
- Balligavi
- Akki Alur
- Devagiri, Karnataka
- 2008 Haveri police shooting
- Ranebennur
- Hangal
- Lakshmeshwar
- North Karnataka
- Hirekerur
- Abalur
- Tourism in North Karnataka
