= Hinduism in Karnataka =

Kannada Hindus Kannaḍa hindūgaḷu
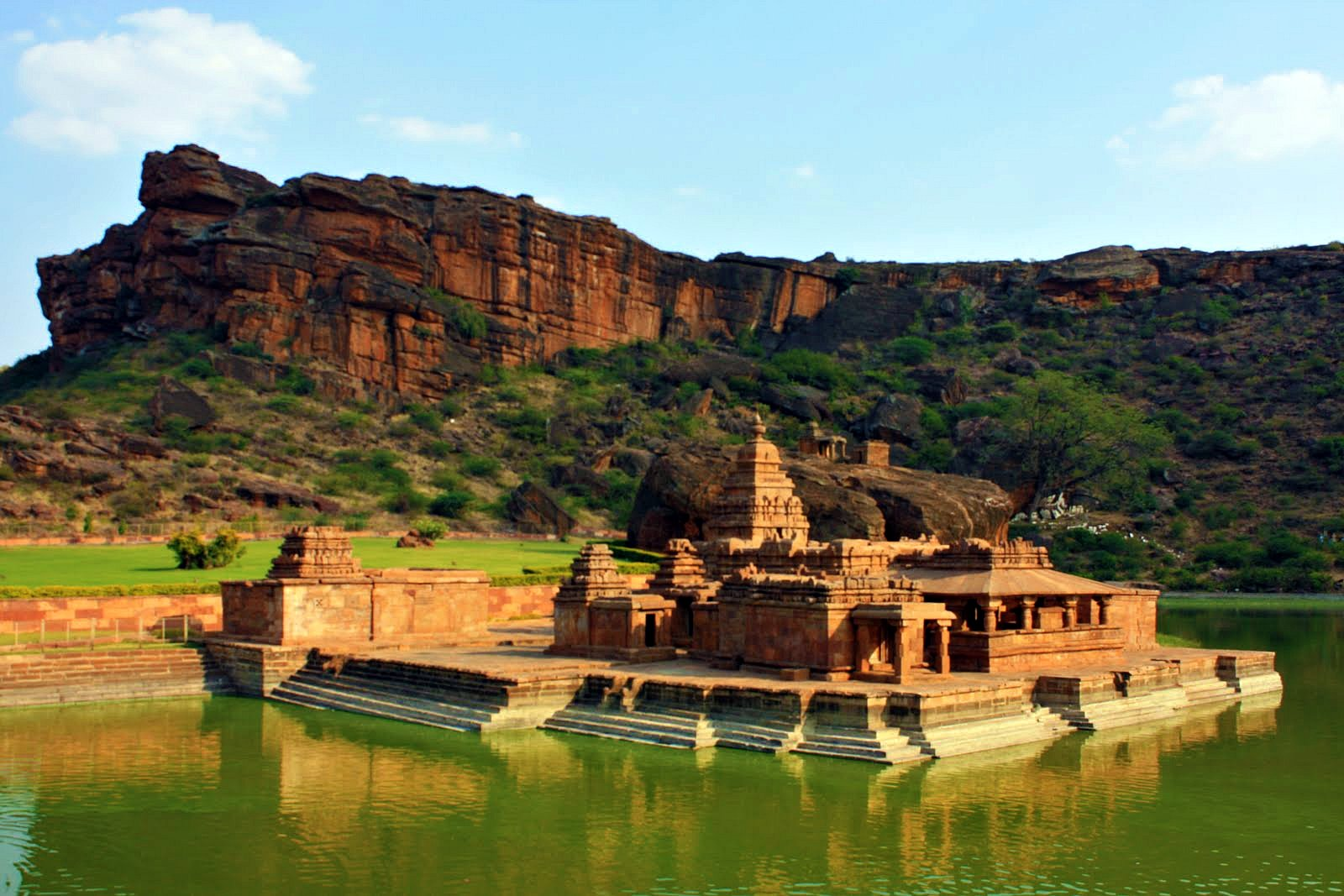
- Bhutanatha temple complex, at Badami.

Total population
- 51,317,472 (2011); 84% of the total population

Languages
- Sacred; Old Kannada and Sanskrit Majority: Kannada; Others: Telugu, Marathi, Tamil, Malayalam, Hindi, Tulu, Konkani and others

Hinduism is the most followed Religion in India and nearly 84% of the total population of Karnataka follows Hinduism, as per 2011 Census of India. Several great empires and dynasties have ruled over Karnataka and many of them have contributed richly to the growth of Hinduism, its temple culture and social development. These developments have reinforced the "Householder tradition", which is of disciplined domesticity, though the saints who propagated Hinduism in the state and in the country were themselves ascetics. The Bhakti movement, of Hindu origin, is devoted to the worship of Shiva and Vishnu; it had a telling impact on the sociocultural ethos of Karnataka from the 12th century onwards.

In current times, Hinduism has a significant role in the Karnataka politics and society and plays an important role in day-to-day life of the people.

== Movements ==
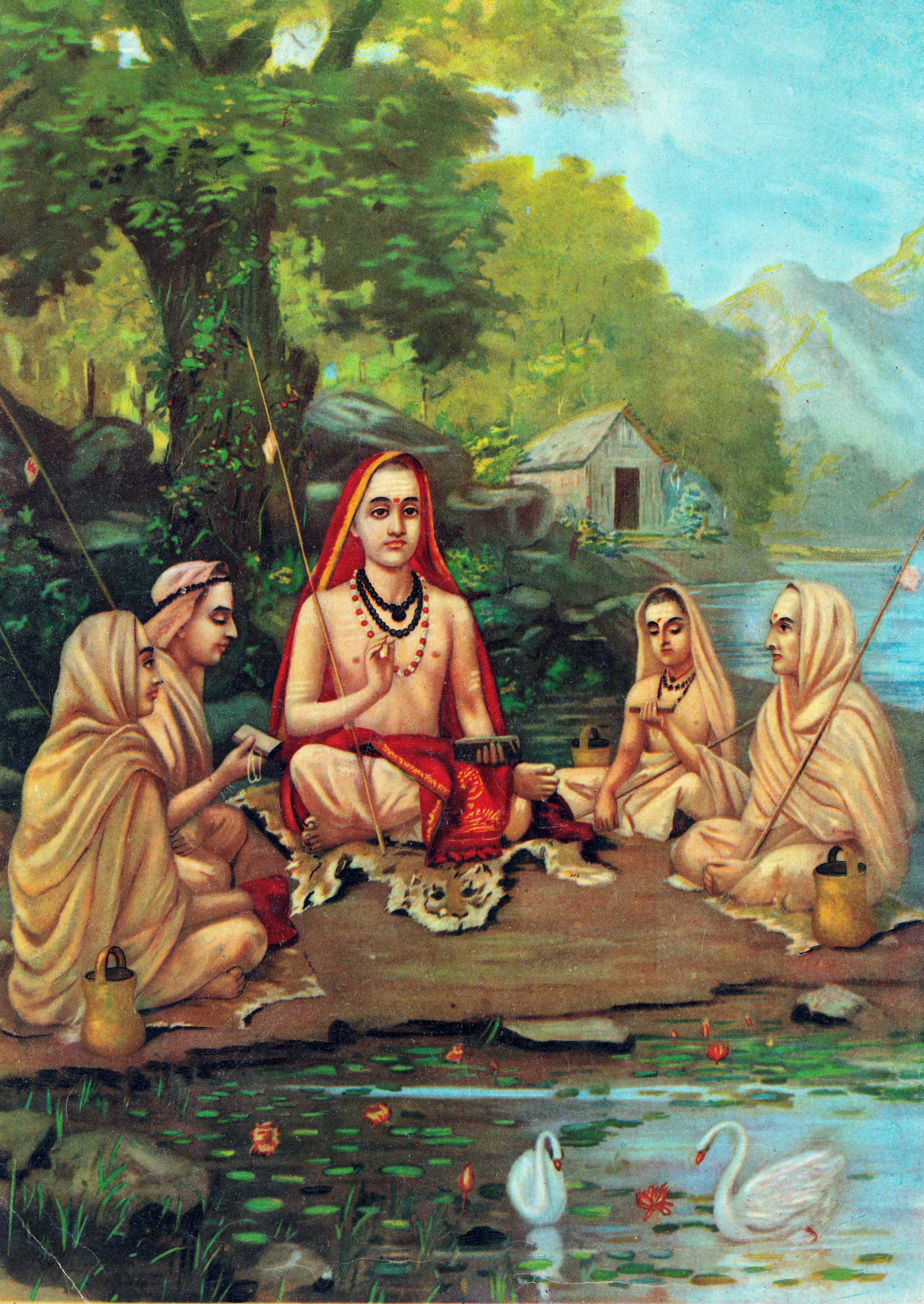
Shankaracharya, philosopher saint who propounded the Advaita philosophy

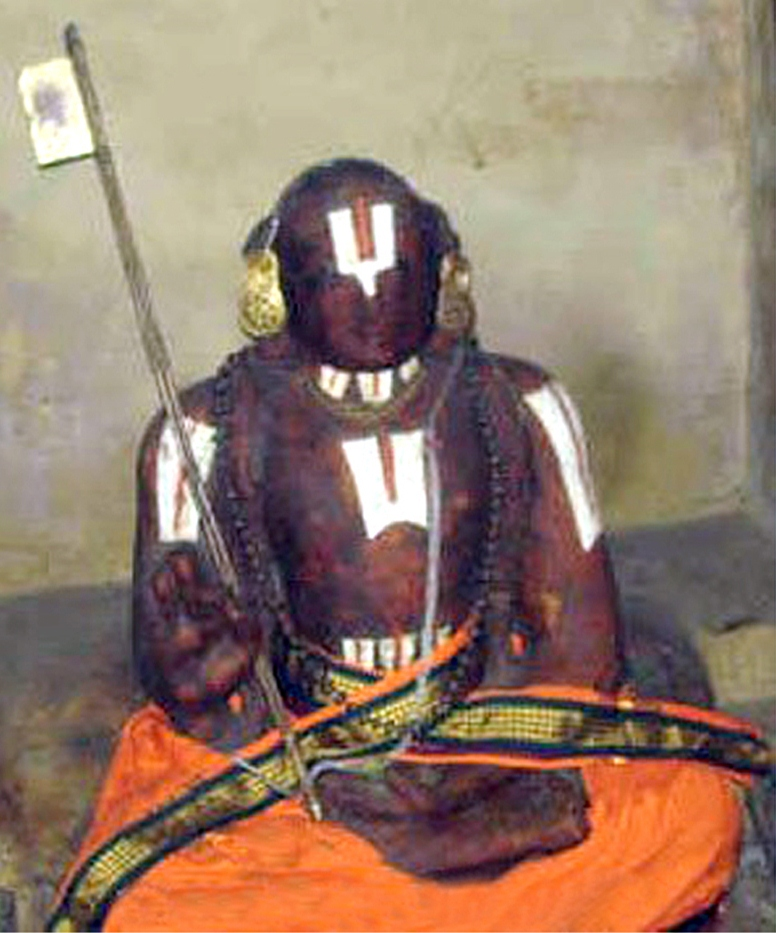
Shri Ramanuja, philosopher saint who founded the Vishishtadvaita philosophy

Karnataka was the birthplace of several notable Hindu movements. The three most prominent movements of Vedanta Hinduism -- Advaita Vedanta, Vishishtadvaita and Dvaita—began in Karnataka. The Dvaita Madhvacharya, who was from Karnataka, was the chief proponent of Tattvavāda, the "philosophy of reality". The Advaita Adi Shankara chose Sringeri in Karnataka to establish the first of his four mathas. The Vishishtadvaita philosopher Ramanuja, considered a saint in Sri Sampradaya, fled from persecution by the Shaiva Chola dynasty of Tamil Nadu, and stayed in Karnataka from 1098 to 1122. He first lived in Tondanur and then shifted to Melukote where the Cheluvanarayana Swamy Temple and a well-organised math (religious centre) were established. He was patronized by Hoysala Vishnuvardhana. Udupi, Shringeri, Gokarna and Melukote are also well known places of Sanskrit and Vedic learning.

=== Lingayatism ===
Hinduism is the largest religion in Karnataka, followed by Buddhism, Christianity, Jainism, Islam and Sikhism. According to the 2011 census, 84.00% of the state's population practices Hinduism. In the past, Jainism dominated Hinduism. In the 12th century, Lingayatism emerged in northern Karnataka as a protest against the rigidity of the prevailing social and caste system. Leading figures of the movement, such as Basava, Akka Mahadevi and Allama Prabhu, established the Anubhava Mantapa where Lingayatism was expounded. This was to form the basis of the Lingayat faith and its followers, the Lingayats, account for 17% of the total population of 65 million in Karnataka. When the Lingayat sect came to be established in Karnataka, the then prospering Jain community's practice of Jainism became ineffectual as a religious practice in the state. Ligayats hold a considerable sway in Karnataka to this day.

=== Bhakti ===
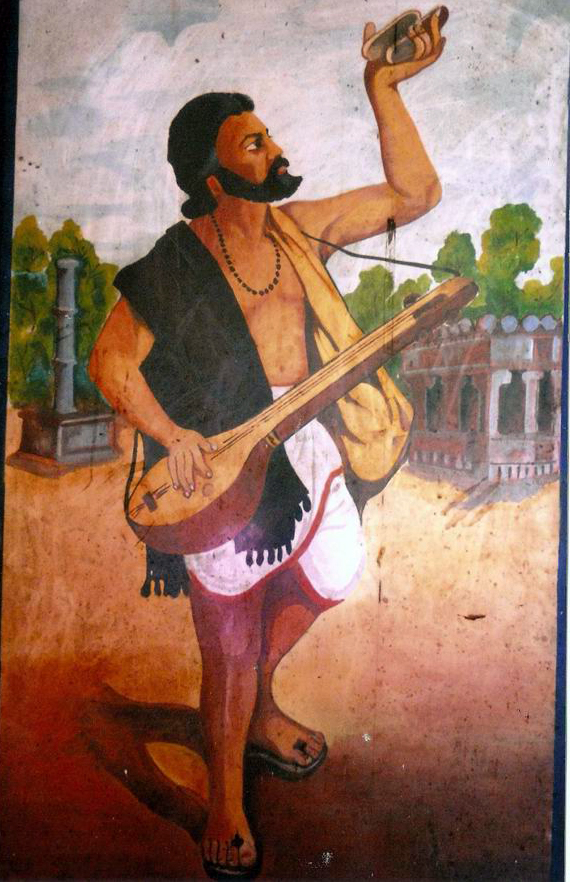
Kanakadasa one of the famous Haridasas of the Bhakthi movement

Under the Bhakti movement, Vishnu and Shiva were the main focus of devotion by both Lingayat and Brahminical communities. The devotional movement in Hinduism is divine grace and is known as the Bhakti movement. Basava (1106–1167), also called Basavanna, protested against caste system and was for equality among all classes. His movement was called the Bhakti Movement and it had a profound paradigm shift in the socio-cultural ethos of the state of Karnataka. The basic tenet of this philosophy, propounded from the 12th century by the Virashaiva school or Virashaivism, was opposition to the caste system, rejection of the supremacy of the Brahmins, abhorrence to ritual sacrifice, and insistence on Bhakti and the worship of the one God, Shiva. His followers were called Virashaivas, meaning "stalwart Shiva-worshipers". The Ligayat or Virashaiva sect were the forerunners in this movement. They abhorred caste system and were emphatic to practice the direct interaction with god and symbolically express it through wearing small linga around their neck signifying their faith. The Shaiva Siddhanta, which included tantric practices also formed the base line for the Lingayat religion. But their religious ethos was not to the liking of other Hindu groups.

Allama Prabhu a poet saint in the 12th century of the Lingayat sect, was a contemporary of Basava. Allama was instrumental in prompting bhakti cult through his poems in Kannada language among Shiva worshipers. This was an enlightened way of worship in which caste distinctions were discarded. It was believed that Allama was incarnate of Lord Shiva and hence he was given the epithet 'Prabhu' which was suffixed to his name. His poems were totally devotional and expressed in his status of achieving detachment from rituals.

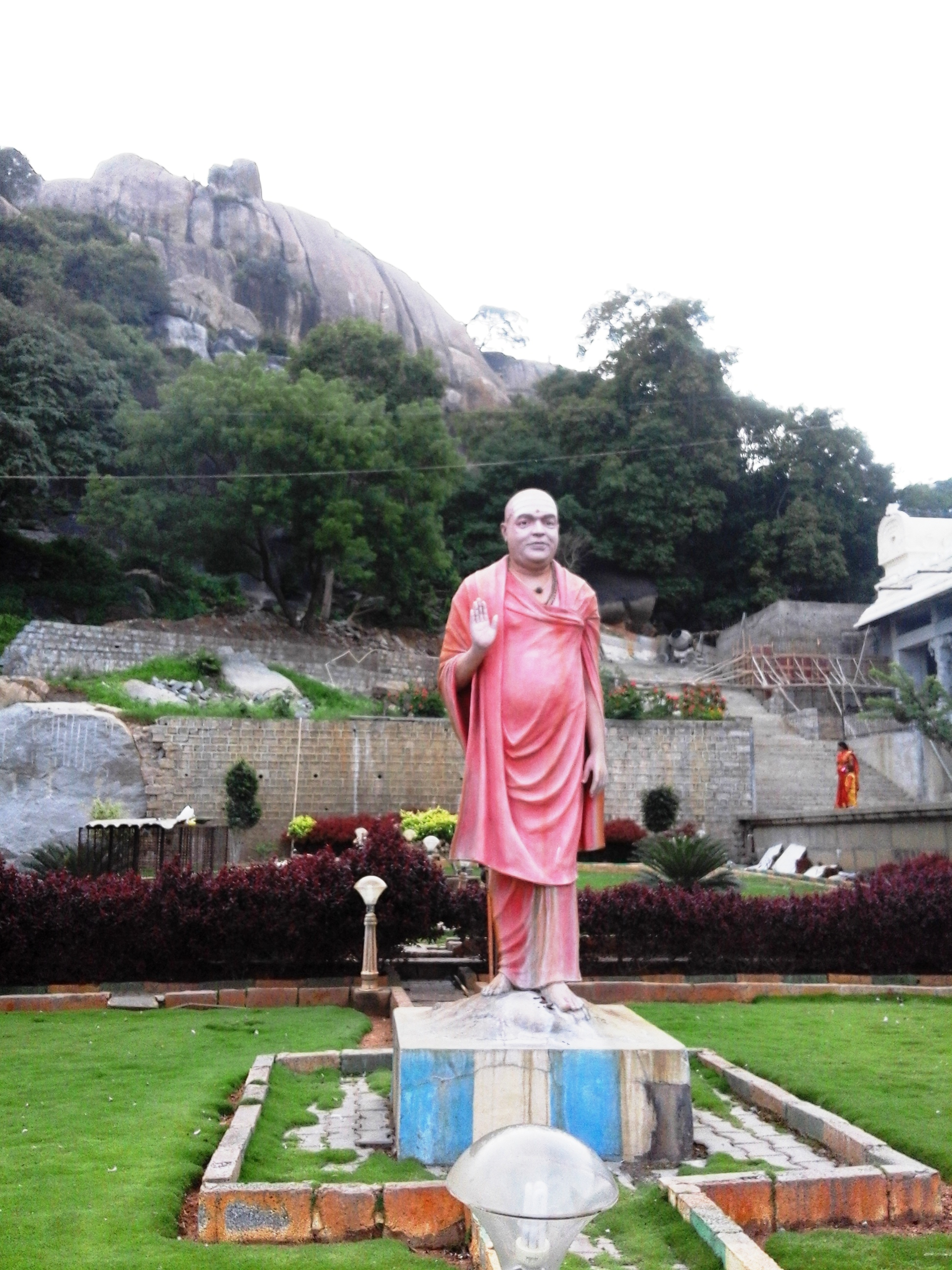
Adichunchanagiri Math.

=== Lakula, Kalamukha, and Kapalikas ===
In Karnataka before the Lingayats' started their bhakthi movement, there was the Kalamukha sect who were worshipers of Shiva. They practiced the movement from the 11th century. They were also opposed to asceticism like the Lingayats. The Kalamukha were a sub-sect of the Lakula Sect, who had lot of influence over the people. They collected funds for their temples and mathas (monastic centers). The Kalamukha ascetic sect was popular during the 9th to 13th centuries, but is now extinct. They painted their faces with a black streak and were contemporary to another sect known as Kapalikas. Their religious dogmas are not clear except for some inscriptions which attest to their strong influence in Karnataka.

=== Haridasas ===
Another bhakthi movement established in the 13th century was of Haridasas, a devotional group of saints who formed the group under the same name, and who were Vaishnavites of the Dvaita philosophy. The founder of this movement was Naraharitirtha, a devout Madhva follower. Their worship is devoted to various forms of Lord Vishnu or Hari. This Bhakthi cult's propagation was not only worship of Vishnu but also to discard animal sacrifice, stop beliefs in superstitions, discourage caste system, and end the worship of many forms of the deity. They also discouraged the practice of astrology and other rituals. Their preachings were in the Kannada language through devotional poetry, a language of the people. However, there were two sects in this group one who wanted the Sanskrit language to be followed, the Vyasakuta and the Dasakuta. The notable Haridasas of that period were Purandaradasa, Vyasaraya, Kanakadasa, Vadiraja, Vijaya Dasa, Jagannatha Dasa, Vasudeva Dasa and Gopala Dasa; many of them became heads of the religious maths founded by Madhva and his disciples. Haridasas are still popular and the songs scripted by many of the earlier Haridasas are very popular.

== Language ==
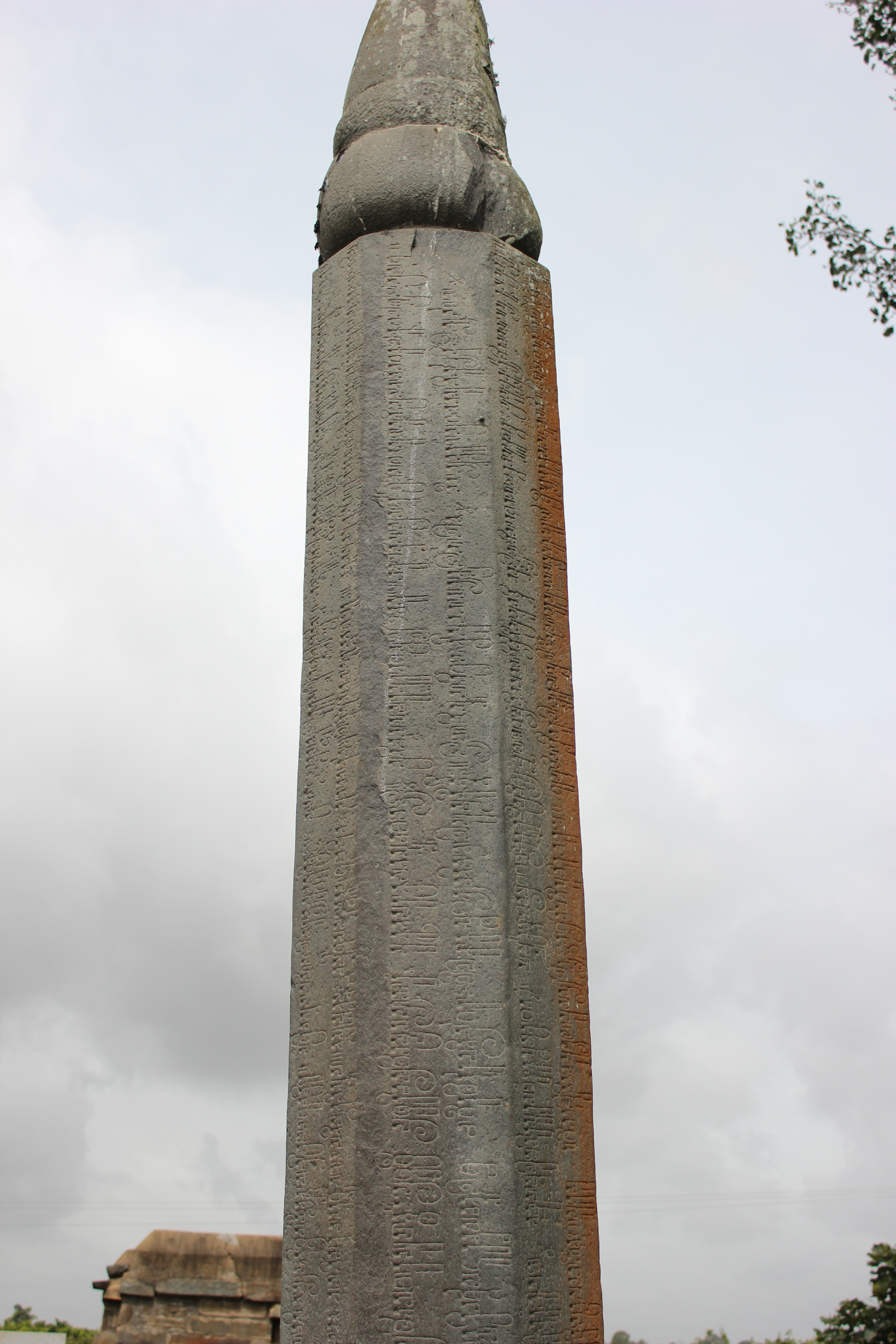
Talagunda Pillar inscription dates to the 5th century.

Karnataka is one of the four states of South India where Kannada is spoken. Sanskrit in South India as a basic language is evidenced in a stone pillar inscription dated between 455 and 470 AD in Talagunda in Shivamogga district of the state. The inscription is in the language of Kadamba Kakusthavarma; the posthumous record is inscribed in Late southern Brahmi script during the reign of Santivarma (450 to 470 AD). Traditions of Hinduism are practiced in both Sanskrit (considered a superior language) and vernacular languages. The upper castes practice the religion mostly in Sanskrit, whereas the lower-class people practice it in the vernacular language of the region, which constitutes almost 80% of the rural community.

== Castes ==
During the British Raj the caste classification of the Hindu religion, in their proper hierarchical order, was done in the late 19th century and a publication titled Castes and Tribes of Southern India was published. This monumental work covers all castes in all the states of the then British India; the Bombay state covered the region from Sind in the north (now in Pakistan) to Mysore State (now Karnataka) in the south.

== Architecture ==
=== Chalukya dynasty ===
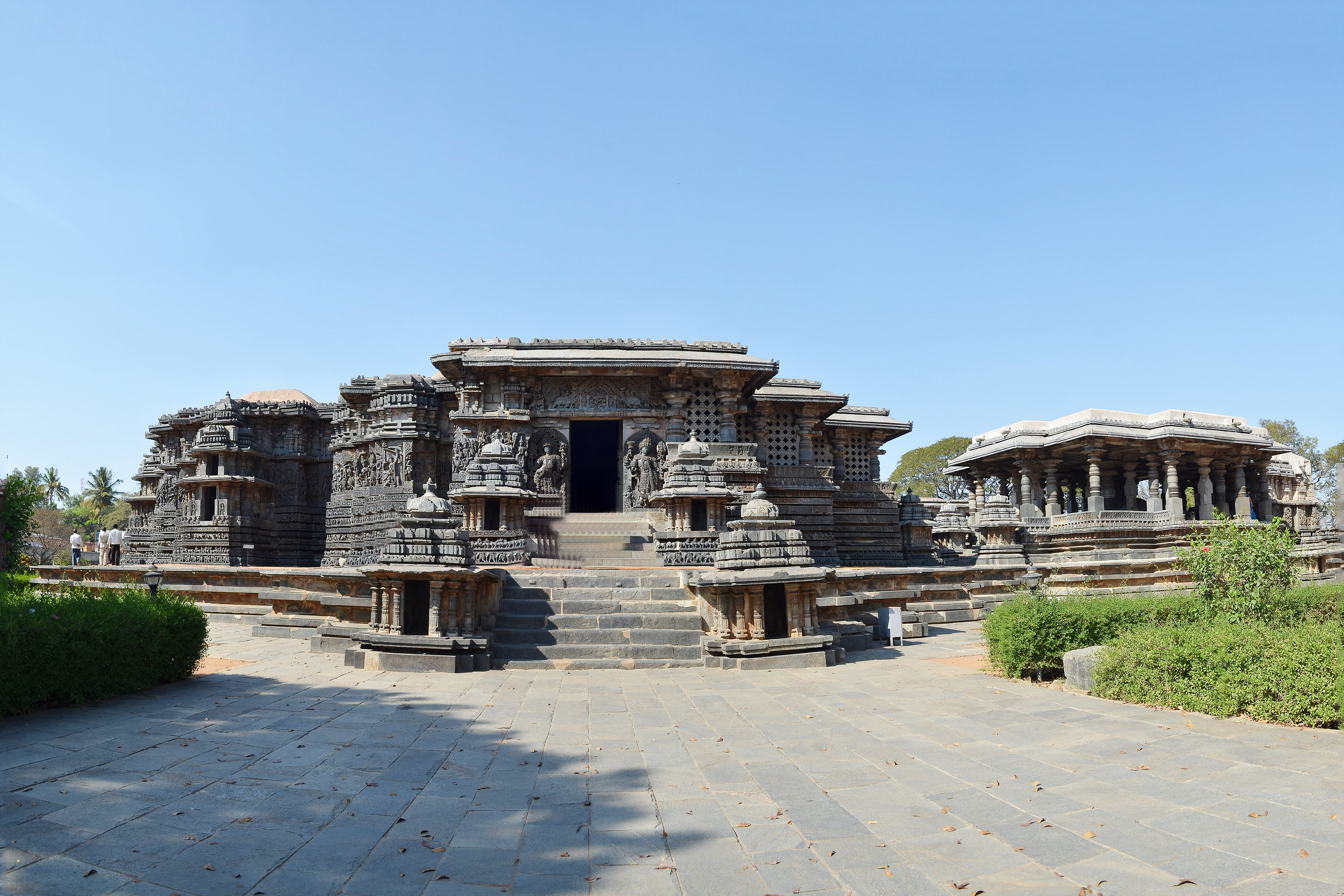
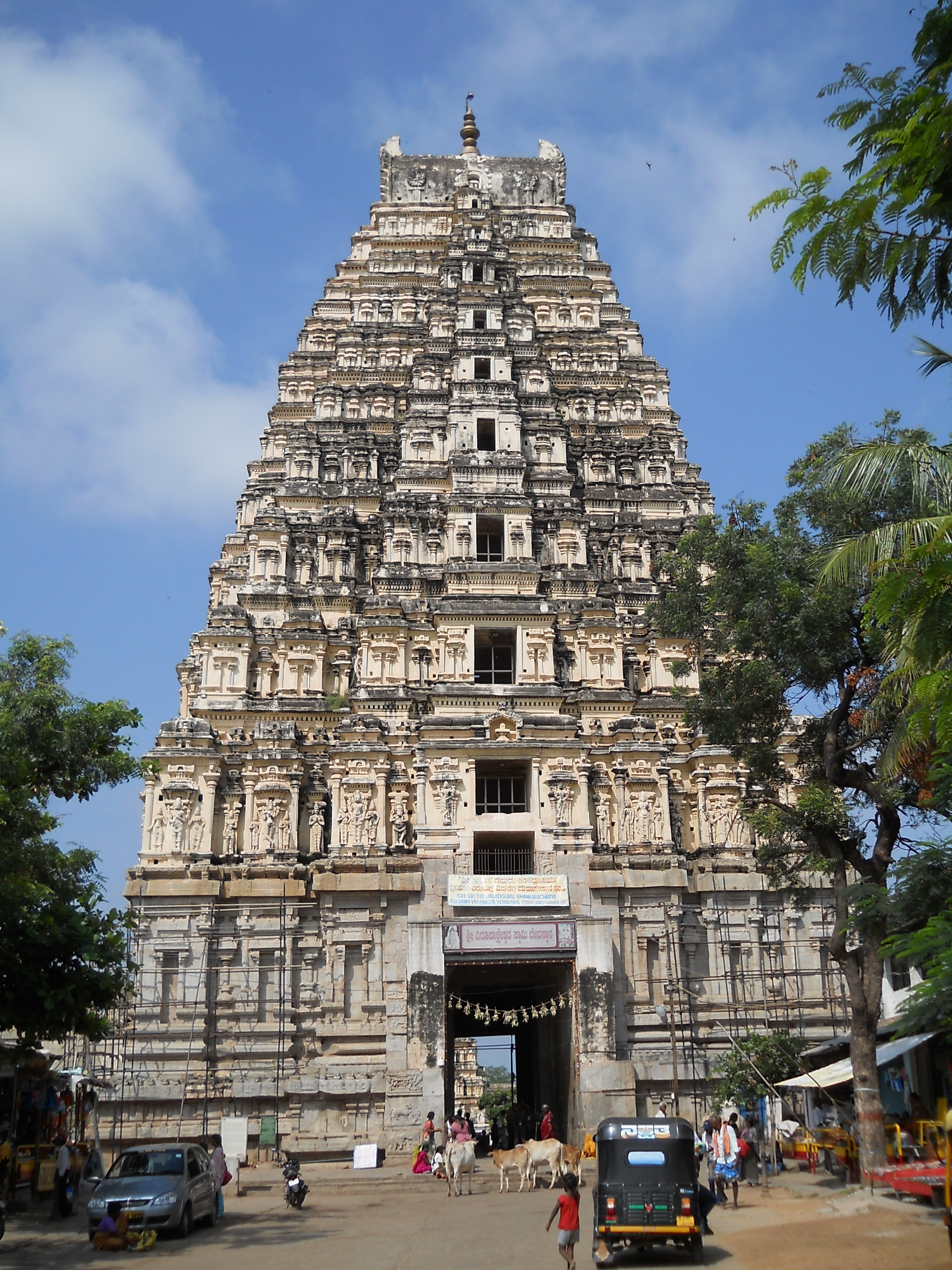
Left: Hoysaleswara Temple at Halebidu; Right: Virupaksha Temple, Hampi.

One of the seven rivers of India sacred to Hindus is the Kaveri River which has its origin in Karnataka and there are many Hindu tirtha sthanas (sacred sites or places) on its banks. One of the notable thirtha sthanas (religious centre) on the bank of the river is Srirangapattana. The historical site of Aihole is where the Chalukya dynasty ruled in the state from 4th-8th century. They built a large number of Hindu temples, some of which are still extant. This was the period of evolution of Hindu architecture. The architectural style introduced during this period were rock cut architecture in the form of cave temples (chaitya) which comprised an enclosed courtyard called vihara. The earliest temple built was in 450AD which had a square mandapa (pavilion) and a tower (shikara) above the image of the main deity. These became forerunners for later period Hindu temples and resulted in the evolution of Hindu medieval temple architecture.

=== Hoysala Empire ===
Th reign of the Hoysala Empire occurred between the 10th and 14th centuries over the western region of Karnataka. Many temples were built with chlorite stones or soapstones and the architecture which evolved was called the Hoysala architecture, known for architectural detailing. The unique features of this style comprise a central hall linked to three star shaped shrines, and the temple towers are laid in horizontal tiers. Dorasamudra, known as Halebeedu, was the dynastic capital. Hoysaleswara Temple is dedicated to the Hindu god Shiva as the family deity of the Hoysalas. Bittiga, the ruler of the Hoysala empire, converted from Jainism to Hinduism. He was given the name Vishnuvardhana by Ramanuja, one of the three eminent social reformers and religious heads of Hinduism who consecrated the Hoysaleswara Temple built in 1121. Dedicated to Shiva, it has two sanctum sanctorums and the deities are in the form of lingas named Hoysaleshvara and Shantaleshvara, after the king and queen. Built over a period of 70 years, it was left incomplete. It has an enormous Nandi, the mount of Shiva. There is a small Surya (Sun god) temple behind the sanctorum deified with a Surya (Sun) image which is 2 metres (6 ft 7 in) in height. The walls of the temple have been carved with scenes of Ramayana, Mahabharata and the Bhagavad Gita epics; they are crafted on the external and internal walls, with Yabancharya named as the architect. The town was ravaged by Muslim invaders in 1327.

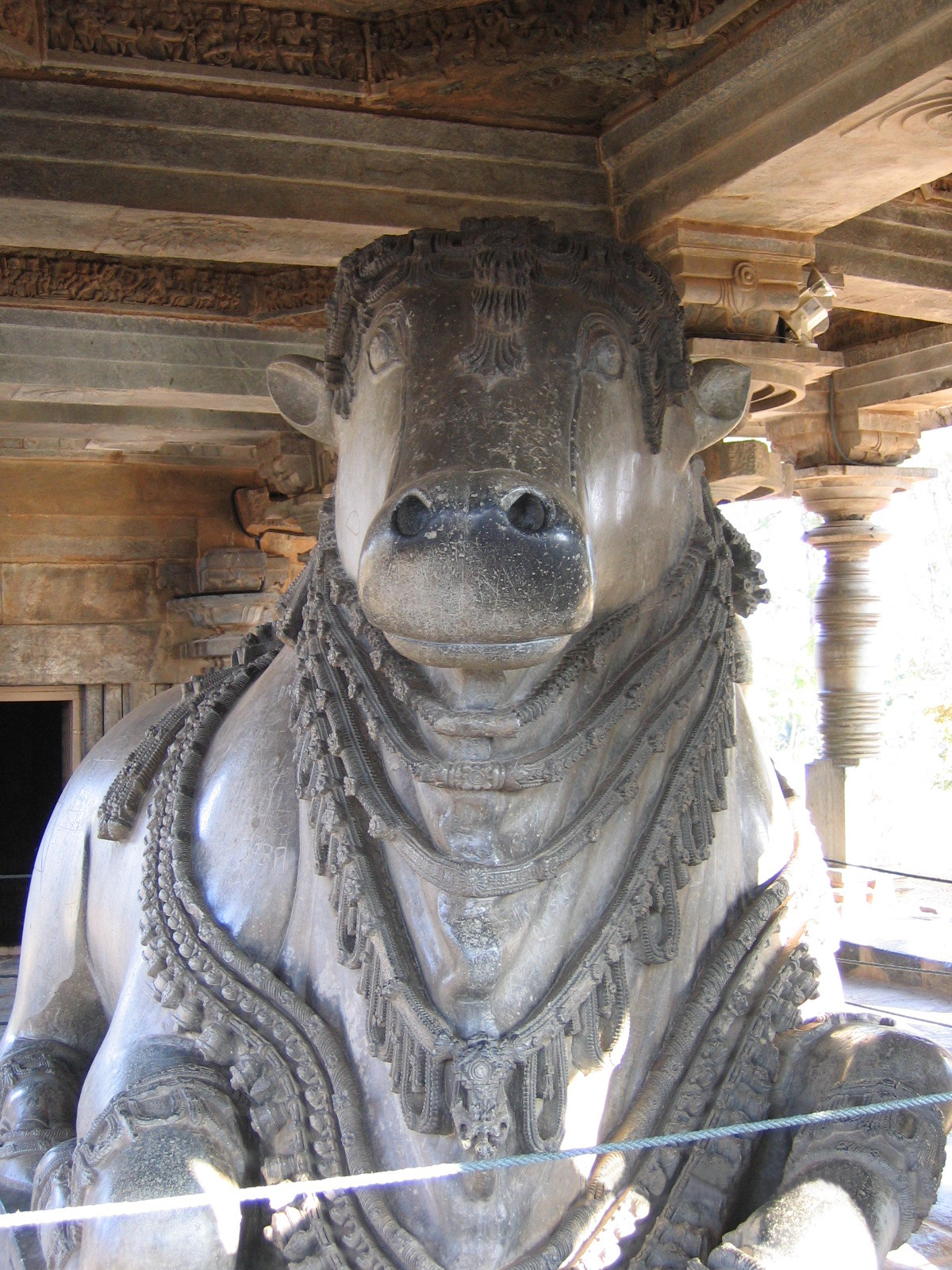
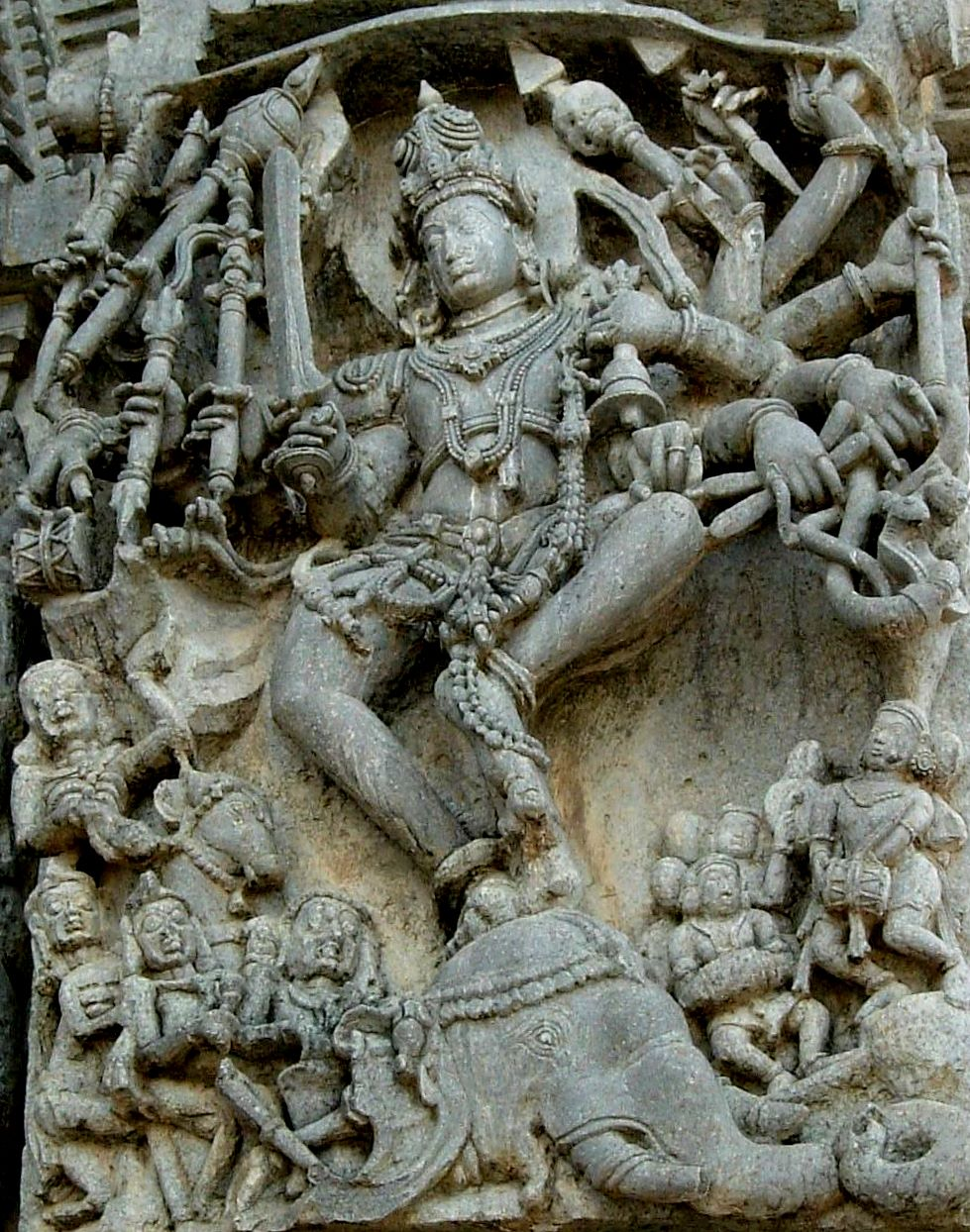
Left: Sculpture of Shiva's mount, Nandi, in Halebeedu, Karnataka. Depictions of Nandi are common in the state; Right: Shiva tearing an elephant (Gajasura) - Chennakesava temple, Beluru. Hoysala Empire architecture in Beluru.

=== Vijayanagara Empire ===
Vijayanagara Empire ("city of victory") was founded by Harihara in 1336. During the invasion by Bahmani Sultanate (Muslim rulers), Harihara was captured and was converted to Islam, thus becoming an outcast among Hindu religionists. As he grew up, he became a valiant warrior and was sent to conquer South India for the Sultanate. But he decided to establish his own kingdom and reconverted to Hinduism, an indication of religious tolerance that was prevalent during the medieval period; there was no opposition from the orthodoxy. Hampi is another great city of the medieval period where the Vijayanagara empire flourished between 1336 and 1565 and held sway over most of the Indian peninsula; this city was sacked by the invading Muslim army in 1565.

=== Nagara and Vadara styles ===
Other temples built are in a blend of Nagara style (north Indian architecture) and Dravidian architecture, also called as Vadara style. One depiction of Vishnu in the state dates back to the 6th century. The Bhoga Nandeeshwara Temple in Nandi village is one of the oldest temples in Karnataka dating to the 9th century. The temple, hewn out of rock, comprises two complexes. While the first complex houses three deities, the second complex consists of a huge and majestic kalyani or pond. The foundation of the temple was laid by the Banas of the 9th century. The Chola rulers of the 11th century constructed the roof of the temple. The marriage hall was built by the Hoysalas in the 13th century and a wall of the second complex was built by the Vijayanagar kings. Stone carvings are a popular tourist attraction and are a source of inspiration for students of art and architecture.

== See also ==
- Lingayats
- Karnataka Tamils
- Religion in Karnataka
- Jainism in Karnataka
  - Jainism in North Karnataka
