= Baada, Shiggaon =

Baada Bad
- village
- Nickname: kanaka(valmiki)
- Location in Karnataka, India Baada (India)
- Coordinates: 14°57′0.96″N 75°13′8.59″E
- Country: India
- State: Karnataka
- District: Haveri district
- Taluk: Shiggaon

Population (2001)
  - Total: 1,670

Languages
  - Official: Kannada
- Time zone: UTC+5:30 (IST)
- Telephone code: 08378
- Vehicle registration: KA 27

Baada also known as "Baad" is a village in the Shiggaon taluk of Haveri district in the Indian state of Karnataka. It is the birthplace of Sri Kanaka Dasaru. It is located near the Bankapura fort.

== Demographics ==
As of the 2001 India census, Bada had a population of 1,670 with 850 males and 820 females and 292 Households.

== Transport ==
Baada is southwest of District headquarters Haveri and 20 kilometres (12 mi) from Taluka headquarter Shiggaon. Both towns are connected by road and train.

== History ==
Baada is the birthplace of one of the Hindu saints Kanaka Dasa

== Recent developments ==
In December 2022, Karnataka Chief Minister Basavaraj Bommai visited Baada during his Janata Darshan tour, promising development funds for the village.

== See also ==
- Kanakagiri
- Kaginele
- Shiggaon
- Byadagi
- Haveri
- Karnataka
