= Kaginele =

Kaginele Kaginelli
- Village
- Location in Karnataka, India Kaginele (India)
- Coordinates: 14°41′19″N 75°21′35″E
- Country: India
- State: Karnataka
- District: Haveri district
- Taluk: Byadagi

Languages
  - Official: Kannada
- Time zone: UTC+5:30 (IST)
- PIN: 581 153
- Telephone code: 08574
- Vehicle registration: KA 27

Kaginele, also known as Kaginelli, is a village in the Byadagi taluk of Haveri district in the Indian state of Karnataka. In August 2004, the Karnataka State Government formed the Kaginele Development Authority (KDA) to protect all the monuments and documents related to Kanaka Dasa.

== Kanaka Dasa ==
Kaginele is famous for Kanaka Dasa, who is venerated as a saint by the Kuruba Gowda community. In addition to poems and songs he wrote about philosophy and social issues and worked as a social reformer in the village. A Krishna temple in the village, the Keshava, is dedicated to his family god and contains a statue of Kanaka Dasa.

In 2004, the Karnataka state government decided to protect his works and monuments. Hence, the Kaginele Kanaka Guru Peetha (temple) was built. The architecture is similar to most temples in the state, with sculpted figures and idols.

Shri. Beerendra Swamiji organized a function in 2005, encouraging people from Karnataka to share in his vision of developing Kaginele as a Maha Samstana. This resulted in the creation of the Shri. Kanakadas Kaginele Kshetra spiritual and devotional center plus an educational institute for poor local children.

== Demographics ==
The 2001 Indian census stated that Kaginele's population totaled 4,755, with 2,514 males and 2,241 females in 773 households.

== Transport ==
Kaginele is 13 km (8.1 mi) from the district headquarters Haveri and 15 km (9.3 mi) from the taluka headquarters Byadagi. Both these towns are connected by road and train to Kaginele. Trains runs daily from Bangalore City Junction to Kolhapur via Haveri.

The nearest airport is at Hubli, 89 km (55 mi) away. There are other airports at Sambre and at Dabolim, Goa, which are 170 and 202 km (106 and 126 mi) away from the village.

Kaginele is connected by road to the nearby settlements of Haveri, Byadagi and Hubli, and serviced by a network of bus routes.

== Places to visit ==
- Sirsi – 75.7 km (47.0 mi) from Kaginele.
- Honnemardu – 82 km (51 mi) from Kaginele.
- Hubli – 88 km (55 mi) from Kaginele.
- Jog Falls – 90 km (56 mi) from Kaginele.
- Yana – 96 km (60 mi) from Kaginele.

== See also ==
- Kanakagiri
- Byadagi
- Haveri
- Karnataka
- Hampi
- Belludi Mutt, Harihar
