= Kadaramandalagi =

- village
- Country: India
- State: Karnataka
- District: Haveri
- Talukas: Byadgi

Population (2001)
  - Total: 5,400

Languages
  - Official: Kannada
- Time zone: UTC+5:30 (IST)
- Nearest city: (Ranebennur,581115)

Kadaramandalagi is a village in the southern state of Karnataka, India. It is located in the Byadgi taluk of Haveri district in Karnataka.

== Demographics ==
As of 2001 India census, Kadaramandalagi had a population of 5400 with 2735 males and 2665 females.

== See also ==
- Haveri
- Districts of Karnataka

This place is famous for Kantesh Temple which attracts large number of devotees every year.
