= Bankapura =

- town
- Location in Karnataka, India
- Coordinates: 14.9167°N 75.2667°E
- Country: India
- State: Karnataka
- District: Haveri

Area
  - Total: 8 km^{2} (3.1 sq mi)
- Elevation: 578 m (1,896 ft)

Population (2001)
  - Total: 20,264
  - Density: 2,533/km^{2} (6,560/sq mi)

Languages
  - Official: Kannada
- Time zone: UTC+5:30 (ISTBankapura)
- PIN: 581 202
- Telephone code: 08378
- ISO 3166 code: IN-KA
- Website: bankapurtown.mrc.gov.in

Bankapura is a panchayat town in Haveri district in the state of Karnataka, India. It is in Shiggaon taluk, is just 2.5 km from the Pune-Bangalore national highway NH-4, 22 km from Haveri town. Bankapura is about 45 km from Hubli-Dharwad. An historical site, Bankapura is famous for the Nagareshwara temple, Bankapura fort, The Bankapura Peacock Sanctuary. Baada, the birthplace of Kanakadasa is near to Bankapura.

== History ==
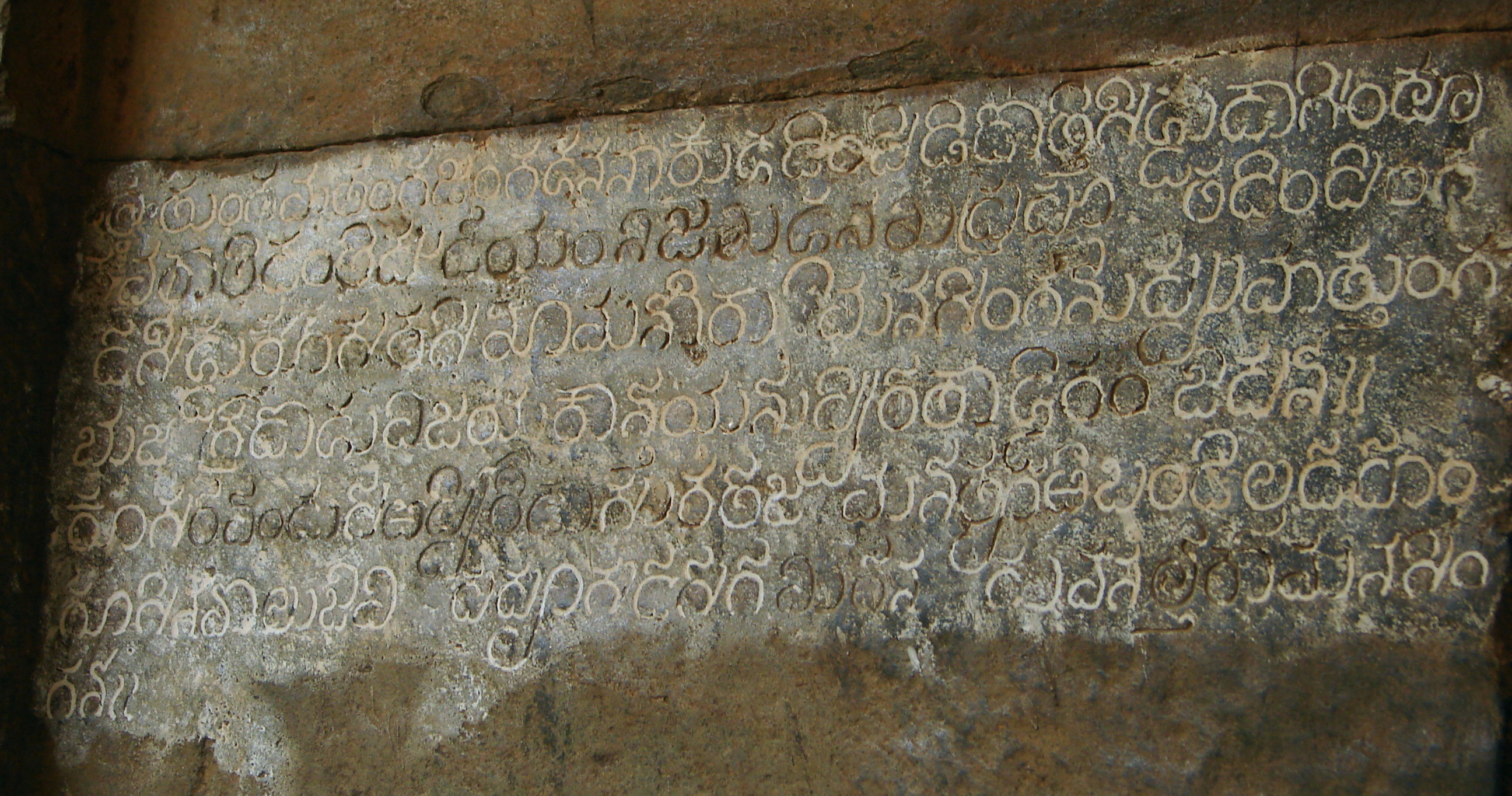
Old Kannada inscription (late 11th - early 12th century) at Nagaresvara Temple in Bankapura, Karnataka

Under the Chalukyas, many temples were built here, but during an invasion by Ali Adil Shah I, the Turko-Persian Sultan of Bijapur in about 1565 most of the temples were destroyed. A fort, now in ruins, at Bankapura houses the Ranganatha Nagareshwara temple, which has 66 pillars carved out of grey stone. There is also a mosque in the fort. The place is of historical significance to Jains. Adipuran, a Jain religious text was composed here. Bankapura fort (454 CE), was ruled by Kadamba of Banavasi, Gangas, Cholas, Rashtrakutas, Hoysalas, Chalukyas, Emperors of Vijayanagara, Turko-Persian Adilshahis of Bijapur, Hyder Ali and Tipu Sultan. During the 9th century, Bankapura was in the honour of Bankeyarasa (in 898 CE) who was a feudatory of the Rashtrakuta Emperor Amoghavarsha I. In the 11th century the Kadambas took over, followed by the Hoysalas ruler Vishnuvardhana.

Invasion by the Bahamnis

In the 16th century, the Turko-Persian Bahmanis invaded Bankapura and Mustapha Khan of Bijapur annexed the fortress after a pitched battle for more than a year. The Nawabs of Savanur and the Marathas ruled for a short duration before Hyder Ali and Tipu took possession. Later, Bankapura was ceded to the British.

Inscriptions

In the Nagareshwara temple, at the entrance to the mukhamantapa, there are large clear inscriptions written in old Kannada.

It is known from history that the great poet of Kannada literature, Ranna, visited Bankapura to meet Ajithsenacharya, who became his teacher.

== Bankapura Fort ==
Inside the ruined Bankapura fort, conquered by the Turko-PersianBahamanis, there is a temple built by the Chalukyas known as Aravattaru Kambada Gudi. Bankapura is an important historical place where many battles were fought by a succession of rulers. In spite of the vandalism the Nagareshwara temple remains ornate.

== Nagareshwar temple ==
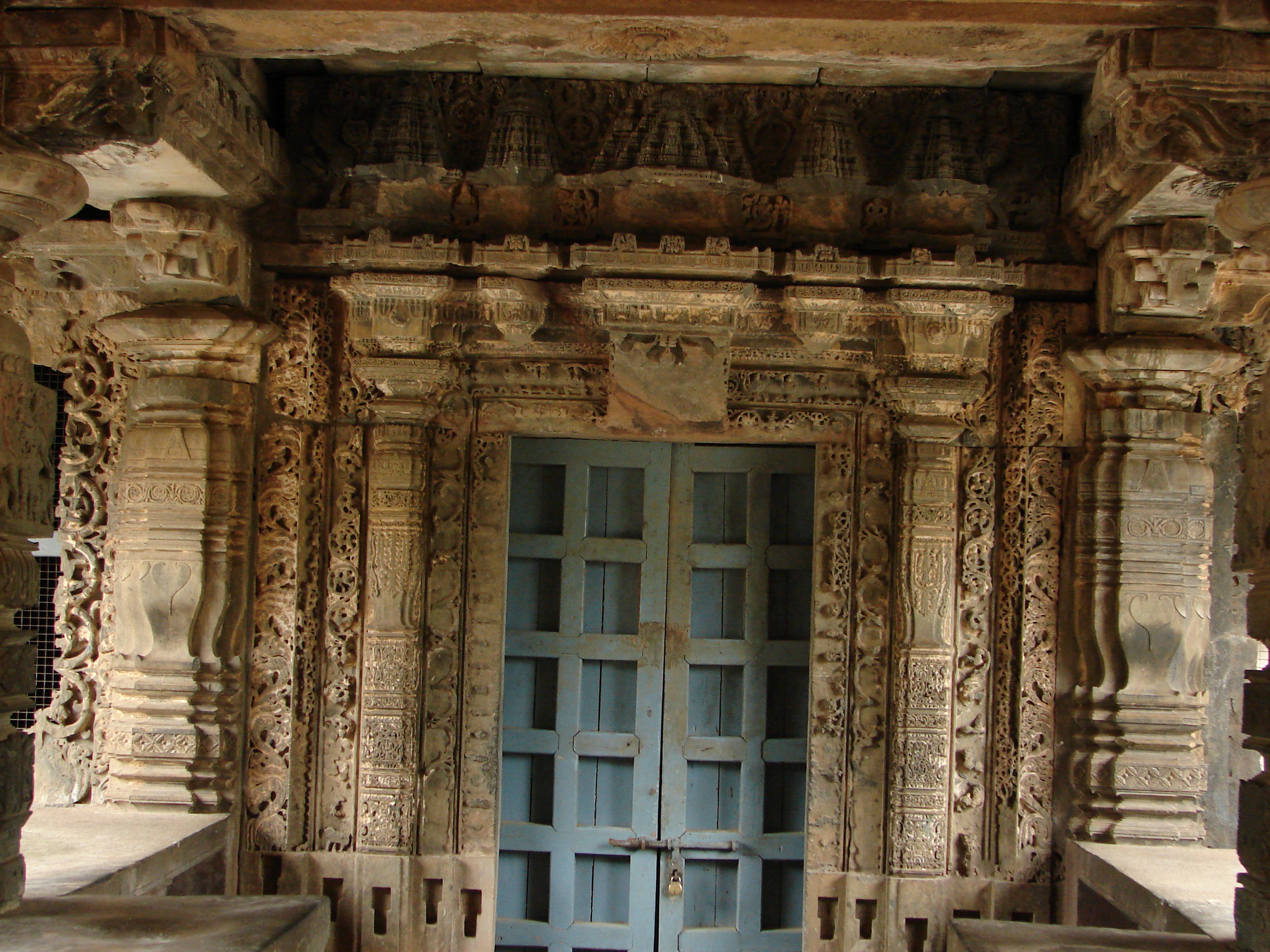
Bankapur Nagaresvara Temple door panels

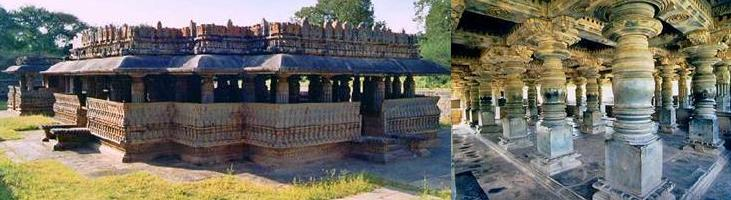
Bankapura Nagareswara temple

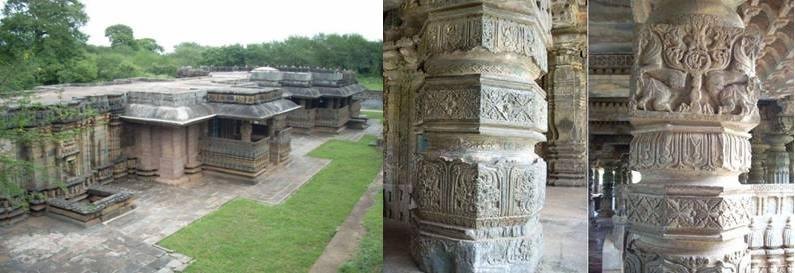
Bankapura Nagareswara temple

The impressive Bankapur fort area has the eye catching 66 pillared Nagareshwar temple (locals call it as Aravattu Kambada Gudi - means 60 pillars temple in Kannada) was built (in a depression to conceal it from invaders) in the 11th century in Chalukya style (in a depression). There are many well carved pillars. The fort area comprises 139.10 acres (0.5629 km^{2}) of land of, which 52.10-acre (210,800 m^{2}) is reserved for the popularly known Mayura Vana, the abode of the peacocks for three decades. As per the 16 inscriptions, has references to the history of this place, it was dedicated to Shiva. The temple also once it was a centre for study and research on Jainism. During rule of Mustafa Khan the temple, the back corners of the temple hall completely damaged including number of carvings in the exterior wall panels but the pillars, the artistic carvings and the ceiling designs are intact.

== The peacock sanctuary ==
Bankapura is a conservation reserve for peacocks by the Government of India.

== Demographics ==
As of 2001 India census, Bankapura had a population of 20,264. Males constitute 53% of the population and females 47%. Bankapur has an average literacy rate of 59%, lower than the national average of 59.5%; with 58% of the males and 42% of females literate. 14% of the population is under 6 years of age.
