= Mohanatarangini =

Kannada literary work

Mohanatarangini (River of delight) is the first work of Kanakadasa (1509–1609), a prominent literary figure in Kannada literature whose works are mostly in the Sangatya (composition meant to be sung to the accompaniment of a musical instrument), Shatpadi (Six line poems) and Shataka (hundred verse) metres. It has been estimated that he may have been around 35 years of age when he wrote this work.

This work, which is the biggest of Kanakadasa's compositions, contains 42 chapters with 2800 verses in the Sangatya metre. It contains various pauranika stories about suras, asuras and Krishna which the author narrates to his wife. The work has been inspired by mythological stories from the Bhagavata, the Mahabharata and various other puranas.

It is believed that Kanakadasa wrote this work when he lost his beloved wife. He seems to recount his personal experiences in fond remembrance of his wife. There is a close relationship between music and Sangatya poems in his work. This is a Sringara Rasa based book spanning over three generations. It is a story of Manmatha (the god of love), his parents Krishna and Rukmini, Pradumya (Rukmini's son), Rathi (Manmatha's wife), Aniruddha and Ushe. This story ends in defeat of demon Banasura and marriage of Ushe and Aniruddha using a presentation similar to sukumara style (a style of poetics elaborated by Kuntaka, a Sanskrit grammarian in his Vakroktijivita).

== Plot ==
In the prosperous city of Dwarakapura, during Krishna’s rule, Krishna's wife Rukmini pines for a child. Krishna blesses her saying that she will give birth to a child who is destined to be burnt to ashes by Shiva. Following this, Rukmini gives birth to Manmatha (God of love).

One day, Manmatha, while fleeing from the demon Tarakasura, comes to Shiva who is deep in meditation. Manmatha breaks Shiva's meditation, and this infuriates Shiva who turns him into ashes. A forlorn Rathi (Manmatha's lover) wanders for many years and eventually comes to Shambasura's kingdom and joins the kitchen as a maid.

Meanwhile, Manmatha reincarnates as Rukmini's son Pradyumna. Shambasura, fearing that Pradyumna is destined to kill him, kidnaps the ten-day-old Pradyumna and casts him away into the sea, where he is swallowed by a fish. The fish is later caught by a fisherman who presents it to Shambasura. The fish is taken to the kitchen where Rathi cuts it open to find Pradyumna. Shambasura gives Rathi permission to take care of the boy without realising that the boy is actually Pradyumna. The child grows into a handsome young man and becomes an expert in all arts.

Later, in a fight with Shambasura, Pradyumna emerges victorious and returns to Dwaraka along with Rathi. Rathi then recounts to Pradyumna that he was actually Manmatha in his previous birth. Pradyumna then weds Rathi and a child is born to them, and they name him Aniruddha.

Shombithapura is ruled by Banasura (a demon), a great Shiva devotee and daughter is Ushe. Aniruddha falls in love with Ushe and wishes to marry her, but this results in a war between Krishna and Banasura. In the ensuing battle, Krishna cuts the thousand shoulders of Banasura at which point Shiva intervenes and proclaims to Banasura that He (Hara) and Krishna (Hari) are one and the same. Banasura gives up the fight and Aniruddha marries his daughter Ushe.

== Highlights ==
The work uses a simple Kannada style and describes the romances of the three pairs that appear in the story. The romances of Krishna and his consort Rukmini is treated in first four Sandhis, the Kama and Rathi romance in next twelve sandhis and that of Anirudha and Ushe in final 26 Sandhis. Though a kavya written in the classical style, with the conventional eighteen descriptions, the work delves into aspects of eroticism in its treatment of the romances.

The book also contains some historical accounts which has helped scholars in reconstructing chronologies of Kannada literature and history. For instance, in an attempt to enumerate ancient India, Kanakadasa names the Hoysana (Hoysala) and Cauta countries; with Cauta probably referring to the territory of the Jaina dynasty of that name on the western coast. The author also heaps praise on contemporary kavIshvaras (poets) who were engaged in translating many of the Vaishnava puraNas into Kannada.

The descriptions of Dwaravati(Dwaraka) that the work provides are in ways very similar to those of Vijayanagara under Krishnadevaraya as seen in the accounts of Portuguese travelers. The descriptions of market places with colourful stalls and demarcated lanes teeming with craftsmen, clients, merchants; royal garden parties and glorious descriptions of the palace are all reminiscent of Vijayanagara under Krishnadevaraya. A drinking bout of men and women of the working classes is particularly vivid. In some places, it appears as though Kanakadasa has described scenes almost as they happened.

== See also ==
- Kanakadasa
- Haridasa
- Dvaita
- Kannada literature
