= Belludi Mutt, Harihar =

Village in Karnataka, India

Belludi Mutt
- village
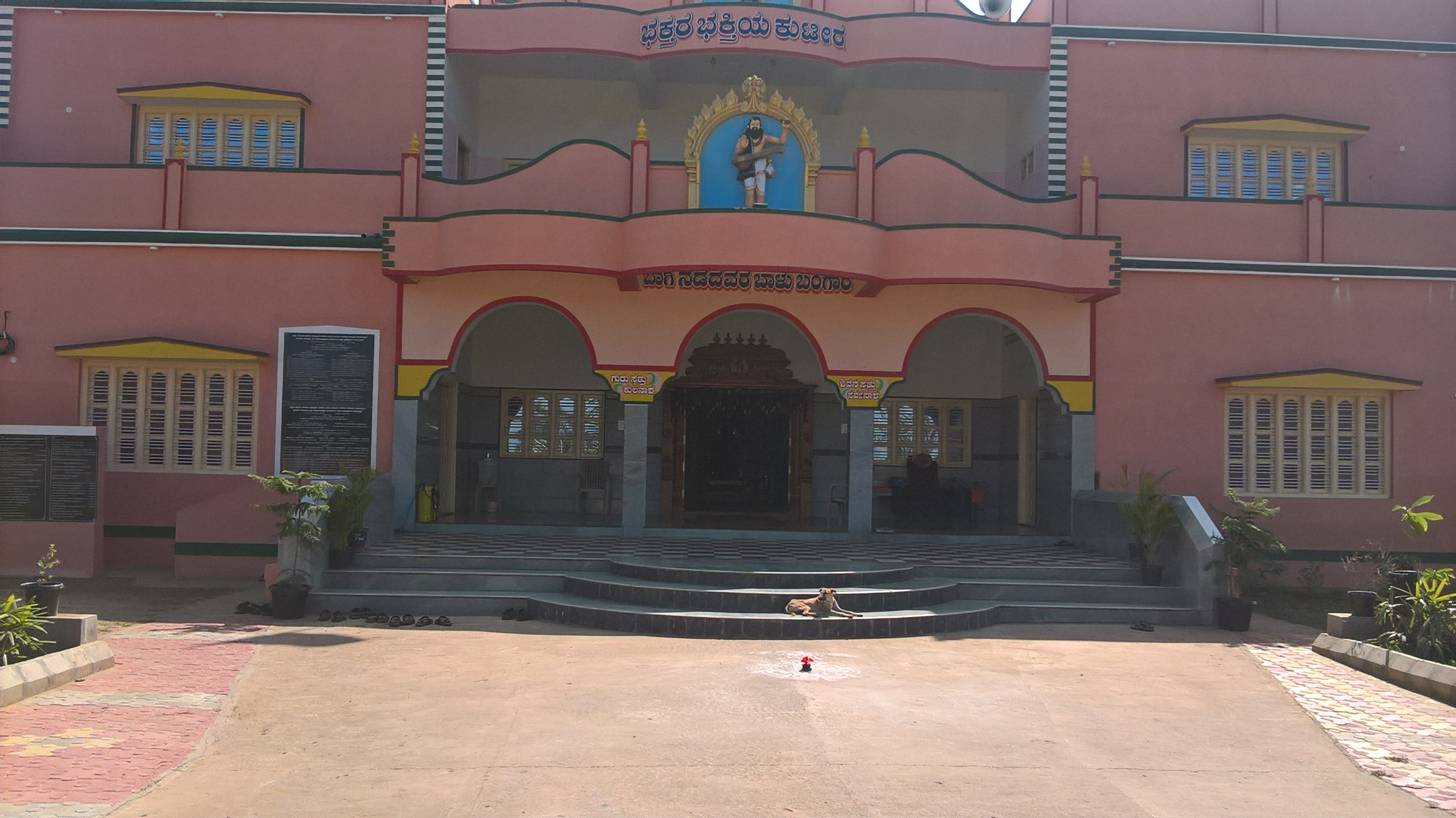
- Belludi Shri Kanakadas Guru Peeta Shakha Mutt
- Country: India
- State: Karnataka
- District: Davanagere district
- Taluk: Harihar

Languages
  - Official: Kannada
- Time zone: UTC+5:30 (IST)
- PIN: 577 601
- Telephone code: 08192
- Vehicle registration: KA 17

Belludi Mutt, also known as Baktara Baktiya Kuteera Belludi, is a village in Harihar taluka of Davanagere district in Karnataka, India. Belludi Village is located in Harihar to Shimoga High Way in Harihar Taluka, Davanagere District Karnataka State. Kaginele gurupeeta shakha halumatha mutt is recently built by halumatha kuruba community Swamiji Jagadaguru Shri Niranjanandapuri of Kaginele, Byadagi Taluka, Haveri District, Karnataka, India.

This kaginele guru peeta shakha mutt was built in 210 days collecting donation from halumatha kuruba community people living in Harihar taluka and around Harihar taluka, Davanagere district, Karnataka.

== Demographics ==
As of 2011 India census, Davanagere district had a population of 681,979 with 344,759 males and 337,220 females Households.

== Transport ==
Belludi is 12 km from Harihar Davanagere and 20 km from Davanagere cityDavanagere. It is well connected by both road and train.

== See also ==
- Davanagere
- Harihar
- Shimoga
- Chitradurga
- Kanakagiri
- Byadagi
- Haveri
- Karnataka
- Hampi
