= Bankapura Peacock Sanctuary =

Wildlife sanctuary in Karnataka, India

Coordinates: 14.920°N 75.262°E

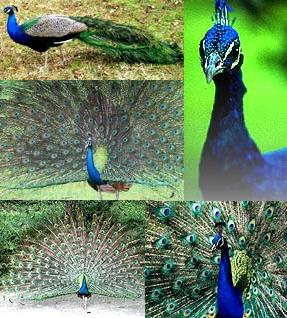
- Peacock sanctuary inside the Bankapura Fort
- Interactive map of Bankapura Peacock Sanctuary
- Location: Bankapura Fort, Haveri District, Karnataka, India
- Area: 139 acres (56 ha)
- Established: 9 June 2006
- Designated: Peacock sanctuary

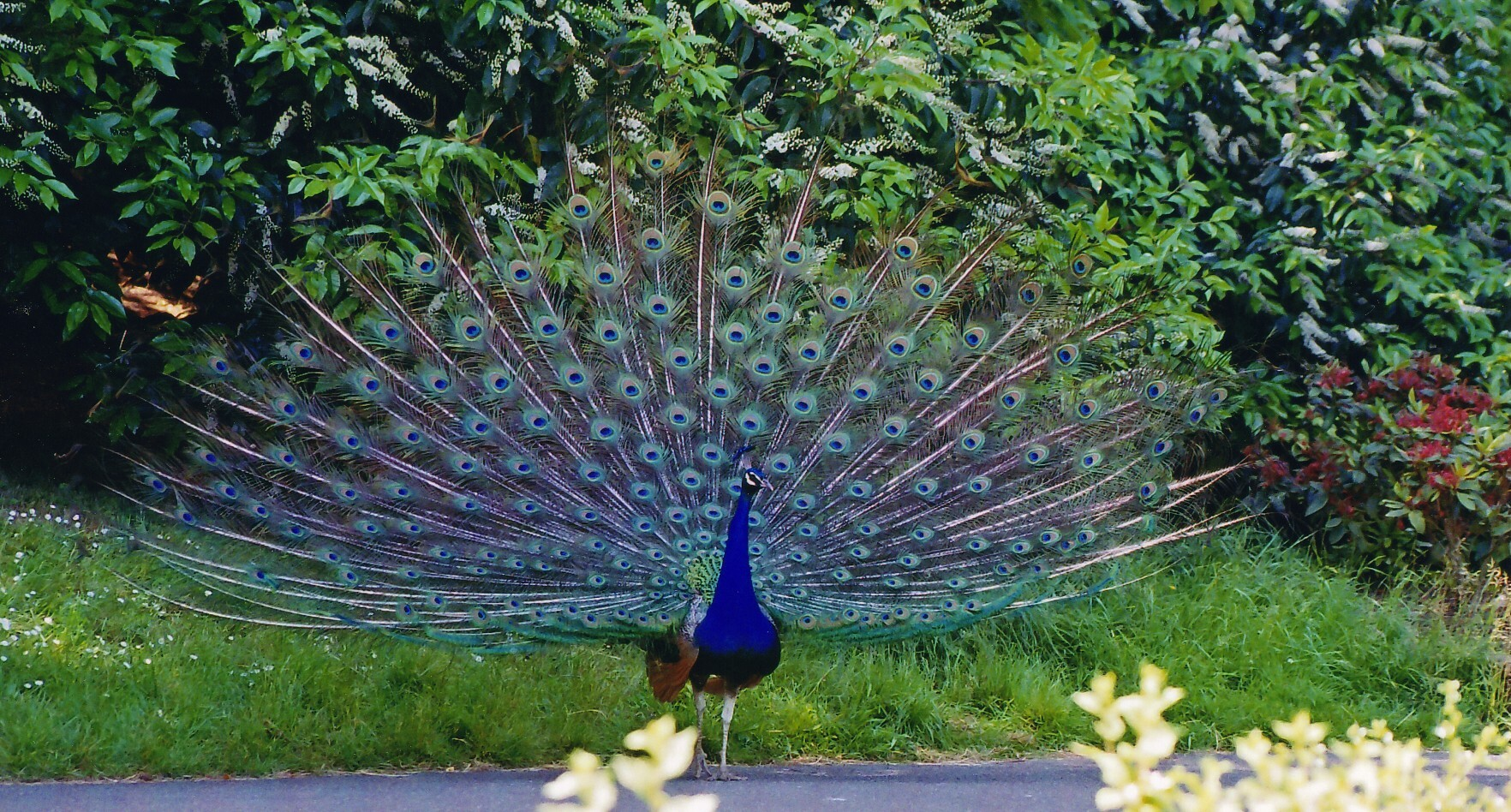
Indian Peacock

Bankapura Peacock Sanctuary is a wildlife sanctuary inside the Bankapura Fort in Haveri District, Karnataka, India.

== Habitat ==
Fodder grown exclusively for Khilari bulls in the area has become an ideal peafowl habitat. The moat is about 36 km long, 10–15 metres wide and 7–8 metres deep. The banks of the moat are covered with Acacia, Neem and Ficus plants. Crops like maize and jowar grown regularly for cattle are delicacies of the peafowl. The navilu pakshidhama in Bankapur is only the second sanctuary in the country that is exclusively engaged in the conservation and breeding of peacocks.

== History and location ==
Understanding the great presence of peacocks in the region, the Government of India declared Bankapura as a peacock sanctuary on June 9, 2006. This sanctuary is situated on 139 acres of land which has the remains of the historic Bankapura Fort. The high mound and deep trenches of the land have provided a perfect home for these birds. The sanctuary is located on the cattle breeding farm which was set up in 1919 after the First World War. The farm is located in 90 acres (360,000 m^{2}), out of the total 139 acres (0.56 km^{2}) of the sanctuary.

== Number of peacocks ==
According to a rough estimate, there are more than 1,000 peacocks and peahen in the sanctuary. Also, minimal human intervention has helped in the breeding of these birds. They walk on the 4 km mound and also perch on green trees. The officials of the Department of Veterinary Sciences have shown great interest in the conservation of these birds, making it easy for the Forest Department to carry on with their job.

== Other birds in the Sanctuary ==
Bankpura Fort is home for not only for peafowl, but also a number of other birds like eagle-owl, babbler, magpie, robin, Asian green bee-eater, nightjar, spotted myna, paradise flycatcher, Indian robin, spotted dove, parakeets, kingfisher, grey hornbill, blue tailed bee eater, black winged kite, tailor bird etc.
