= Vyasakuta =

Division in the Bhakti movement

Vyasakuta was one of two divisions (the other being the Dasakuta) of Haridasas, a group within the Bhakti movement, one of the monotheistic Hindu religious devotional movements focusing on the spiritual practice of loving devotion to a God, called bhakti. This generally means the worship of Lord Vishnu

== History ==
During the 12th and 13th centuries A.D. during the rule of the Vijayanagar Empire in South India, the Haridasa movement spread from the area of modern Karnataka. The Lingayatism movement, the term is derived from Lingavantha in Kannada, spread the philosophy of Basavanna, a Hindu reformer. The Vyasakuta were required to be proficient in the Vedas, Upanishads and other Darshanas.
