= Kanaka Dasa =

Kannada saint (1509–1606)

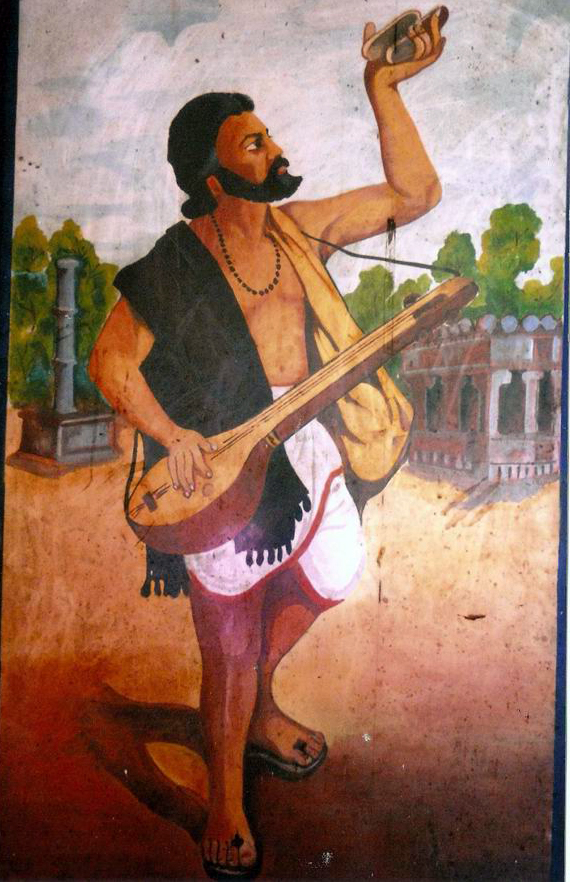
- Painting of Kanakadāsa

Personal life
- Born: Thimmappa Nayaka; 30 November 1508 Baada, Shiggaon, Vijayanagara Empire (present-day Haveri District, Karnataka, India)
- Died: 1606 (aged 97–98) Kaginele
- Parents: Beerappa (father); Bachchamma (mother)
- Occupation: Ruler, saint, poet, philosopher, composer

Religious life
- Order: Haridasa (Dasakuta)
- Philosophy: Dvaita, Vaishnavism

Senior posting
- Teacher: Vyasatirtha

Kanaka Dasa (1509–1606) also known as Daasashreshta Kanakadasa, was a Haridasa saint and philosopher of Dvaita Vedanta, from present-day Karnataka, India. He was a follower of Madhvacharya's Dvaita philosophy and a disciple of Vyasatirtha. He was a composer of Carnatic music, poet, reformer and musician. He is known for his keertanas and ugabhoga, and his compositions in the Kannada language for Carnatic music. Like other Haridasas, he used simple Kannada and native metrical forms for his compositions.

== Birth ==
Kanaka Dasa was born into a Kannada Kuruba family in Baada village, near Bankapura in Karnataka, and was a warrior at the Bankapura fort. He was taught by Srinivasacharya. As a child, he became an expert in "tarka", "vyakarana", and "mimamsa". Based on one of his compositions, it is interpreted that he was injured in battle and took to the practice of chanting the name of Lord Hari. A beggar appeared to Kanaka Dasa, and Kanaka asked who he was. The beggar responded by saying he was called by him (Kanaka). Kanaka Dasa understood the beggar to be Lord Hari (Krishna) Himself. Lord Hari offered to grant Kanaka Dasa three wishes. Lord Hari first asked if Kanaka wanted treasures. Kanaka Dasa refused, but asked for the following, 1) To be healed of all his injuries, 2) For Lord Hari to appear whenever Kanaka Dasa called for him, and 3) To give darshan in his original form. The Lord granted these wishes. Upon seeing Lord Hari in his original form, Kanaka Dasa was mesmerized. After this incident, Kanaka abandoned his profession as a soldier and devoted himself to composing music, writing literature and explaining philosophy to the people about Sri Hari. His early spiritual works include poems such as "Narasimha Stotra", "Ramadhyana Mantra", and "Mohanatarangini".

=== In Udupi ===
Kanaka Dasa had a connection with Udupi as he was the disciple of Vyasatirtha. The priests would not let him enter the mutt, judging him to be a member of lower caste based on his clothes, even though Vyasatirtha asked them to let Kanaka Dasa into the temple. Then a wall cracked and the idol of Krishna turned towards Kanaka.

Kanaka Dasa spent a short time in Udupi. He used the phrase, "Kagineleya Adikeshava" as his signature referring to the deity of Kaginele.He is one of great devotee of lord krishna (vishnu).

== Writings ==
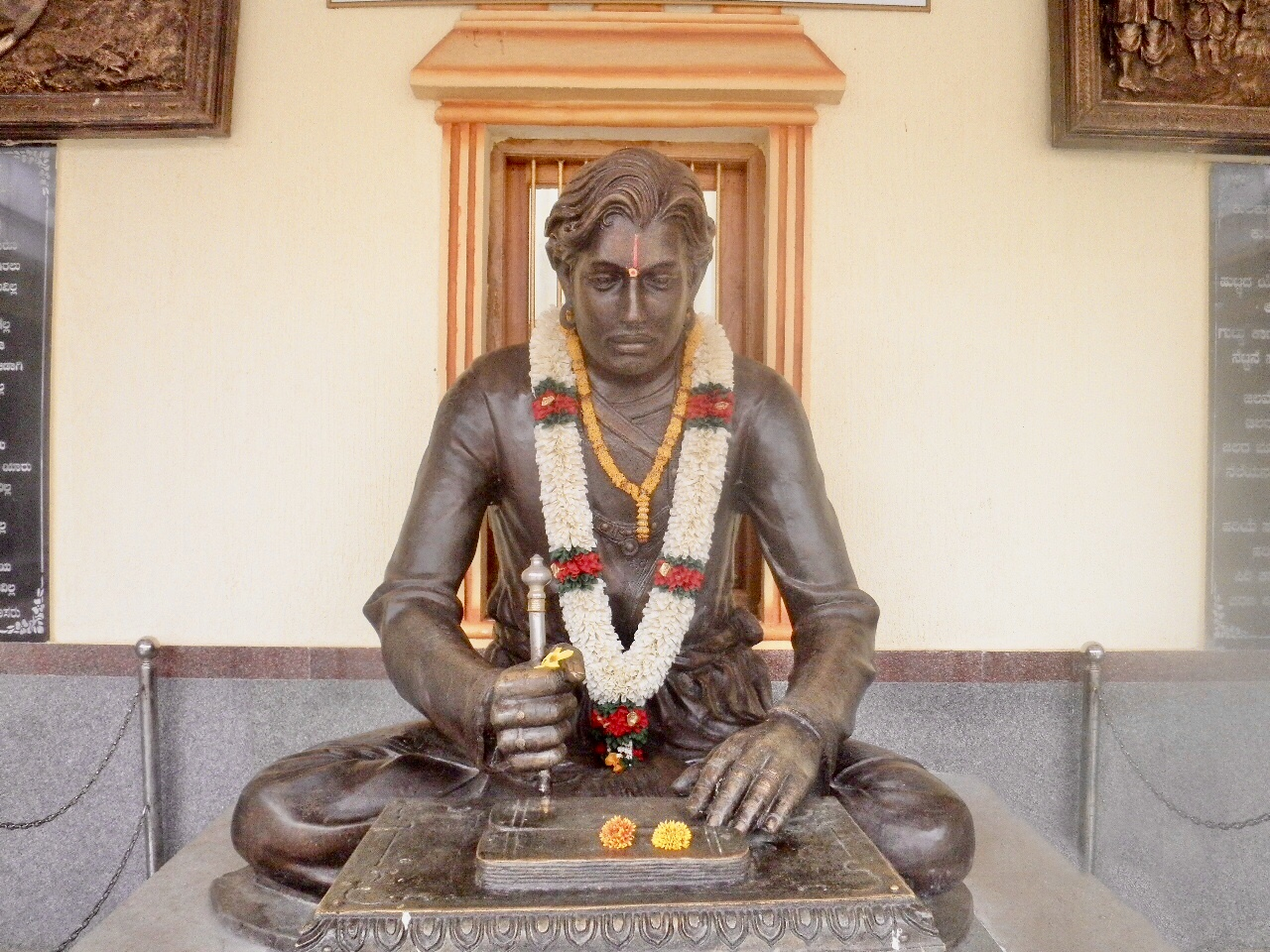
Bronze statue of Kanaka Dasa at Badaa Bankapur.

=== Major works ===
- Nalacharithre (ನಳಚರಿತ್ರೆ)
- Haribhakthisara (ಹರಿಭಕ್ತಿಸಾರ)
- Nrusimhastava (ನೃಸಿಂಹಸ್ತವ)
- Ramadhanyacharithe (ರಾಮಧಾನ್ಯಚರಿತೆ), a rare work on class struggle
- Mohanatarangini (ಮೋಹನತರಂಗಿಣಿ)

Kanakadasa wrote about 240 Carnatic music compositions (kirtane, ugabhogas, padas, and philosophical songs) besides five major works. Around 100 songs in Kannada and 60 songs in English are published in popular books.

== Kanakadasa Palace ==
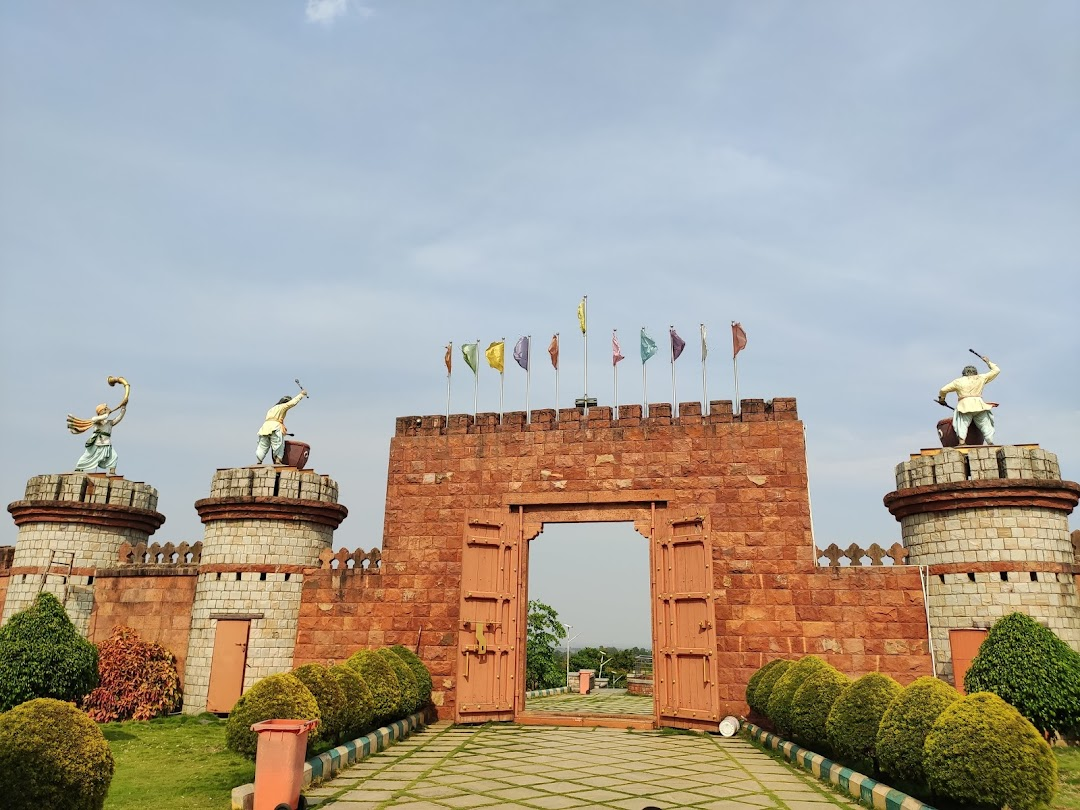
Kanakadasa Fort

During an excavation at Baada, Shiggaon region of Karnataka, the archaeological department found ruins of a fort and a palace which was identified as the era of Kanaka Dasa (who was earlier called Thimmappa Nayaka). The State Government of Karnataka has built a new fort, palace and idols of Kanaka Dasa and his life scenarios commemorating the religious leader.

== In popular culture ==
Kannada actor and singer from the Kannada movie industry Dr. Rajkumar played Kanaka Dasa in the 1960 film Bhakta Kanakadasa which was well received.

Girish Karnad made a documentary film, Kanaka-Purandara (English, 1988), on the two medieval Bhakti poets of Karnataka.

== Legacy ==
=== Kanaka Guru Peetha ===
Kaginele Kanaka Guru Peetha, a mutt established by the Kuruba community, is named in honour of Shri Kanakadasa.

=== Kanaka Dasa stamp ===
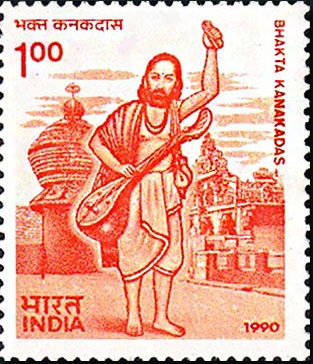
Indian Postal Stamp honouring Sri Kanakadasa

In 1990, the Government of India honored Kanaka Dasa by releasing a postal stamp in his name.

=== Kanakadasa Jayanthi ===
Kanaka Dasa's birthday is celebrated in Karnataka, particularly in the Kuruba community. In 2008, Government of Karnataka decided to commemorate his birthday as a state festival and declared 18 November a state holiday.

== See also ==
- Baada, Shiggaon
