= Dasakuta =

Monotheistic Hindu religious movement

Dasakuta was one of two divisions (along with Vyasakuta) of Haridasas, a group within the Bhakti movement, one of the monotheistic Hindu devotional movements focusing on the spiritual practice of loving devotion to a God, called bhakti. This generally means the worship of Vishnu.

== See also ==
- Guru-shishya tradition
- Paramguru
- Gurukula
