= Byadagi =

- Town
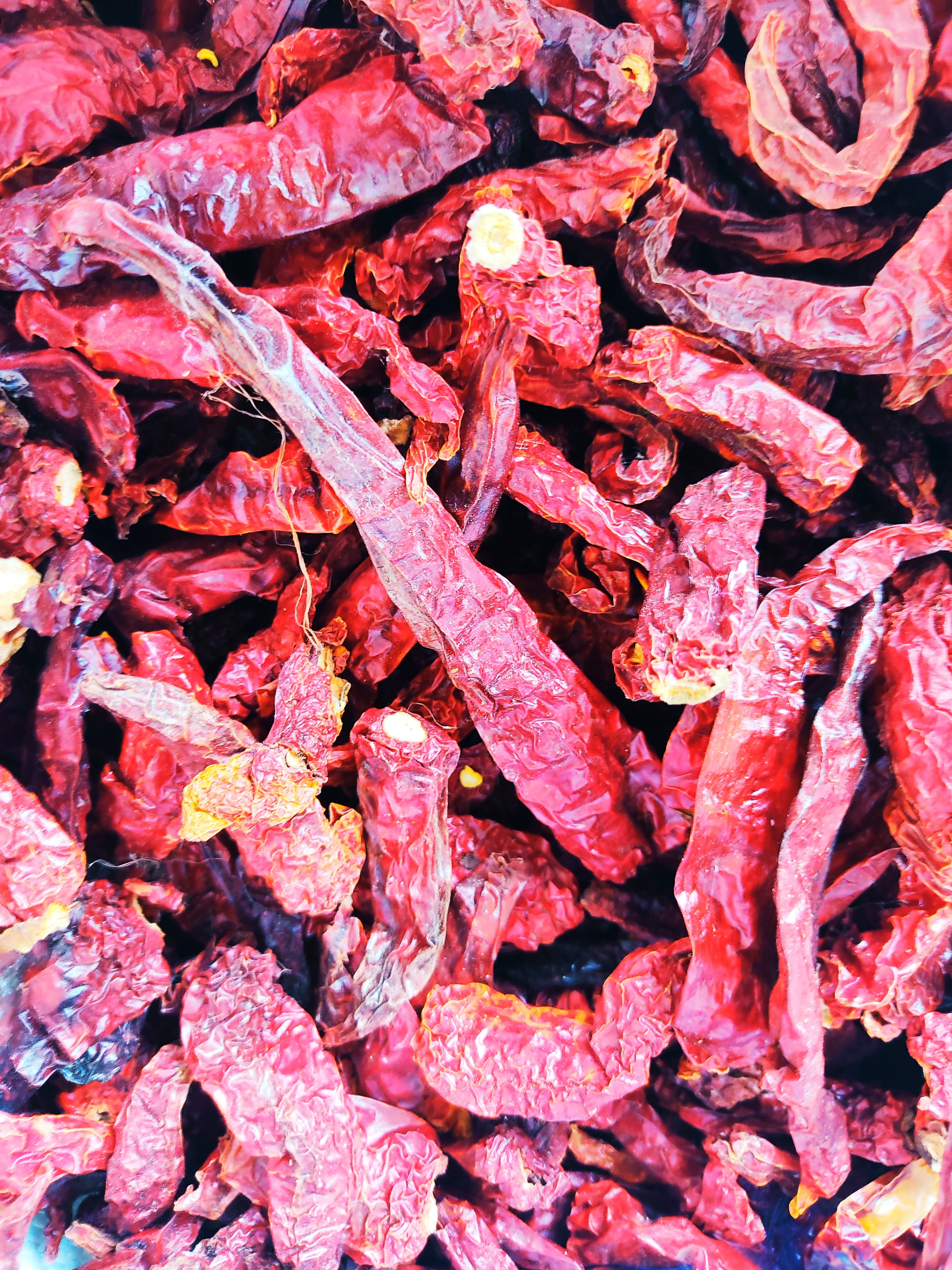
- Byadagi chilli
- Interactive map of Byadagi
- Coordinates: 14.6883139°N 75.4886056°E
- Country: India
- State: Karnataka
- District: Haveri
- Elevation: 601 m (1,972 ft)

Population
  - Total: 30,014
- Time zone: UTC+05:30 (IST)
- PIN: 581106
- Vehicle registration: KA-68Ranebennur
- Official language: Kannada
- Telephone: +91- 08375
- Website: byadagitown.mrc.gov.in/en

Byadagi is a popular town in Haveri district, in the Indian state of Karnataka. It is an agricultural business centre. The town is known for its long, red Byadgi chilli. The nearby city is Ranebennur, which is useful for the export of chilis. The areas surrounding the town produce the chilli.

== Demographics ==
As of 2011 India census, Byadgi had a population of 30,014. Males constitute 51% and females 49%. Byadgi has an average literacy rate of 67%, higher than the national average of 59.5%. Male literacy is 74% and female literacy, 60%. 13% of the population is under 6.

== Culture ==
Sacred site Kaginele is located in Byadgi taluk, 15km northeast from Byadgi town. Kadaramandalagi is another sacred site 6 km from Byadgi. An idol of Lord Kantesha (Hanuman) is present in the temple.

== Education ==
Byadagi has government and private schools and colleges.
